= Silvio Berlusconi =

Italian media tycoon and politician (1936–2023)

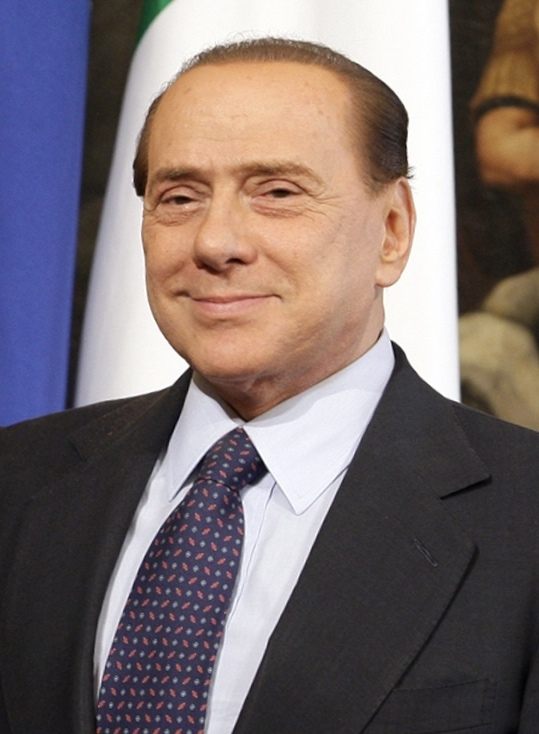
- Berlusconi in 2010

Prime Minister of Italy
- In office 8 May 2008 – 16 November 2011
- President: Giorgio Napolitano
- Preceded by: Romano Prodi
- Succeeded by: Mario Monti
- In office 11 June 2001 – 17 May 2006
- President: Carlo Azeglio Ciampi
- Deputy: Gianfranco Fini; Marco Follini; Giulio Tremonti
- Preceded by: Giuliano Amato
- Succeeded by: Romano Prodi
- In office 11 May 1994 – 17 January 1995
- President: Oscar Luigi Scalfaro
- Deputy: Roberto Maroni; Giuseppe Tatarella
- Preceded by: Carlo Azeglio Ciampi
- Succeeded by: Lamberto Dini

Member of the Senate of the Republic
- In office 13 October 2022 – 12 June 2023
- Constituency: Monza
- In office 15 March 2013 – 27 November 2013
- Constituency: Molise

Member of the European Parliament
- In office 2 July 2019 – 12 October 2022
- Constituency: North-West Italy
- In office 20 July 1999 – 10 June 2001
- Constituency: North-West Italy

Member of the Chamber of Deputies
- In office 15 April 1994 – 14 March 2013
- Constituency: Molise (2008‍–‍2013); Campania 1 (2006‍–‍2008); Lombardy 1 (1996‍–‍2006); Lazio 1 (1994‍–‍1996)

Personal details
- Born: 29 September 1936 Isola, Milan, Kingdom of Italy
- Died: 12 June 2023 (aged 86) Milan, Italy
- Party: Forza Italia (1994–2009); The People of Freedom (2009–2013); Forza Italia (from 2013)
- Spouses: Carla Dall'Oglio (m. 1965; div. 1985) Veronica Lario (m. 1990; div. 2010)
- Domestic partners: Francesca Pascale (2013‍–‍2020); Marta Fascina (from 2020)
- Children: 5, including Marina, Pier Silvio and Barbara
- Relatives: Paolo Berlusconi (brother)
- Education: University of Milan

Silvio Berlusconi (/ˌbɛərlʊˈskoʊni/ BAIR-luu-SKOH-nee; Italian: [ˈsilvjo berluˈskoːni]; 29 September 1936 – 12 June 2023) was an Italian media tycoon and politician who served as the prime minister of Italy in three governments from 1994 to 1995, 2001 to 2006 and 2008 to 2011. He was a member of the Chamber of Deputies from 1994 to 2013; a member of the Senate of the Republic from 2022 until his death in 2023, and previously from March to November 2013; and a member of the European Parliament (MEP) from 2019 to 2022, and previously from 1999 to 2001. At the time of his death in 2023, he had a net worth of US$6.8 billion according to Forbes, making him the 352nd-richest man in the world and the third-wealthiest person in Italy.

Berlusconi rose into the financial elite of Italy in the late 1960s. He was the controlling shareholder of Mediaset and owned the Italian football club AC Milan from 1986 to 2017. He was nicknamed Il Cavaliere ('The Knight') for his Order of Merit for Labour; he voluntarily resigned from this order in March 2014. In 2009, Forbes ranked him 12th in the list of the World's Most Powerful People due to his domination of Italian politics throughout more than fifteen years at the head of the centre-right coalition.

Berlusconi was prime minister for nine years in total, making him the longest serving post-war prime minister of Italy, and the third-longest-serving since Italian unification, after Benito Mussolini and Giovanni Giolitti. He was the leader of the centre-right party Forza Italia from 1994 to 2009, and its successor party The People of Freedom from 2009 to 2013. He led the revived Forza Italia from 2013 to 2023. Berlusconi was the senior G8 leader from 2009 until 2011, and he held the record for hosting G8 summits (having hosted three summits in Italy). After serving nearly 19 years as a member of the Chamber of Deputies, the country's lower house, he became a member of the Senate following the 2013 Italian general election.

On 1 August 2013, Berlusconi was convicted of tax fraud by the Supreme Court of Cassation. His four-year prison sentence was confirmed, and he was banned from holding public office for two years. Aged 76, he was exempted from direct imprisonment, and instead served his sentence by doing unpaid community service. Three years of his sentence were automatically pardoned under Italian law; because he had been sentenced to gross imprisonment for more than two years, he was banned from holding legislative office for six years and expelled from the Senate. Berlusconi pledged to stay leader of Forza Italia throughout his custodial sentence and public office ban. After his ban ended, Berlusconi ran for and was elected as an MEP at the 2019 European Parliament election. He returned to the Senate after winning a seat in the 2022 Italian general election, then died the following year from complications of chronic myelomonocytic leukemia, and was given a state funeral.

Berlusconi was known for his populist political style and brash personality; his views and rhetoric, often referred to as Berlusconism, have deeply reshaped the Italian political landscape. In his long tenure, he was often accused of being an authoritarian leader and a strongman. At the height of his power, Berlusconi was the richest person in Italy, owned three of the main TV channels of the country, and indirectly controlled the national broadcasting company RAI through his own government. He was the owner of Italy's biggest publishing company, several newspapers and magazines, and one of the main football clubs in Europe. At the time of his death, The Guardian wrote that Berlusconi "gathered himself more power than was ever wielded by one individual in a Western democracy".

Berlusconi remained a controversial figure who divided public opinion and political analysts. Supporters emphasised his leadership skills and charismatic power, his fiscal policy based on tax reduction, and his ability to maintain strong and close foreign relations with both the United States and Russia. In general, critics address his performance as a politician and the ethics of his government practices in relation to his business holdings. Issues with the former include accusations of having mismanaged the state budget and of increasing the Italian government debt. The second criticism concerns his vigorous pursuit of his personal interests while in office, including benefitting from his own companies' growth due to policies promoted by his governments, having vast conflicts of interest due to ownership of a media empire, and being blackmailed as a leader because of his turbulent private life.

== Early life and family ==
Berlusconi was born on 29 September 1936 in the Isola district of Milan, where he was raised in a middle-class family. His father, Luigi Berlusconi, was a bank employee, and his mother, Rosa Bossi, a housewife. He was the first of three children; he had a sister, Maria Francesca Antonietta, and a brother, Paolo.

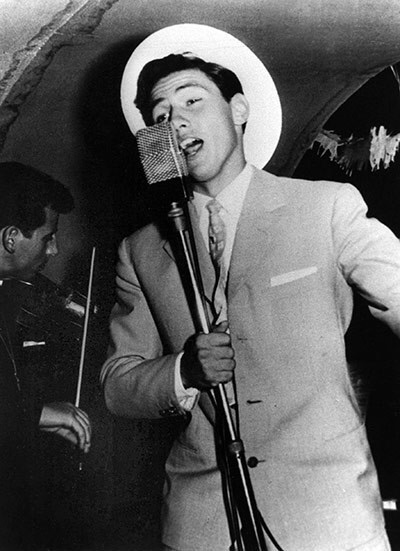
Berlusconi singing on a cruise ship in the 1960s

After completing his secondary school education at a Salesian college, Berlusconi studied law at the University of Milan, graduating with honours in 1961, with a thesis on the legal aspects of advertising. He was not required to serve the standard one-year stint in the Italian army which was compulsory at the time. During his university studies, he played upright bass in a group formed with the now Mediaset Chairman and amateur pianist Fedele Confalonieri and occasionally performed as a cruise ship crooner. In later life, he wrote AC Milan's anthem with the Italian music producer and pop singer Tony Renis and Forza Italia's anthem with the opera director Renato Serio. With the Neapolitan singer Mariano Apicella, he wrote two Neapolitan song albums: Meglio 'na canzone in 2003 and L'ultimo amore in 2006.

In 1965, Berlusconi married Carla Elvira Dall'Oglio, and they had two children: Maria Elvira, better known as Marina (born 1966), and Pier Silvio (born 1969). By 1980, Berlusconi had established a relationship with the actress Veronica Lario (born Miriam Bartolini), with whom he subsequently had three children: Barbara (born 1984), Eleonora (born 1986), and Luigi (born 1988). He was divorced from Dall'Oglio in 1985, and married Lario in 1990. By this time, Berlusconi was a well-known entrepreneur, and his wedding was a notable social event. One of his best men was Bettino Craxi, a former prime minister and leader of the Italian Socialist Party. In May 2009, Lario announced that she was to file for divorce. On 28 December 2012, Berlusconi was ordered to pay Lario $48 million a year in a divorce settlement, but could keep the $100 million house they lived in with their three children.

== Business career ==
=== Milano Due ===
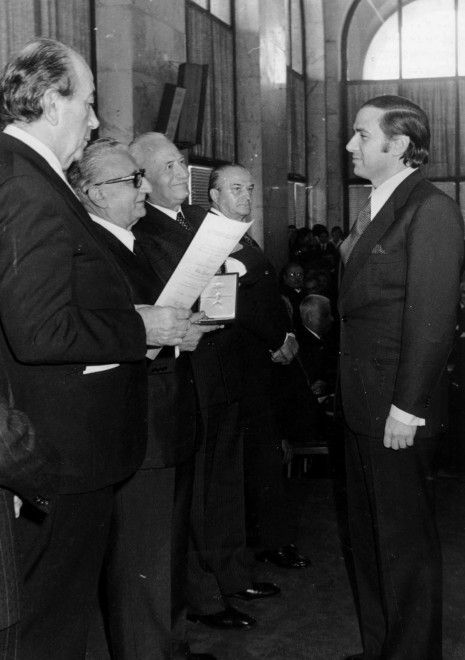
Berlusconi awarded Knight of the Order of Merit for Labour in 1977

Berlusconi's business career began in construction in the 1970s, when he built Milano Due, a development of 4,000 residential apartments east of Milan. The residential centre was built by Edilnord, a Berlusconi-owned company associated with the Fininvest group. Works began on the project in 1970 and was completed in 1979. The profits from this venture provided the seed money for his advertising agency.

=== TeleMilano ===
Berlusconi first entered the media world in the 1970s, buying from Giacomo Properzj and Alceo Moretti a small cable television company, TeleMilano, to service units built on his Segrate properties. It began transmitting in September of the following year. TeleMilano was one of the first Italian private television channels and later evolved into Canale 5, the first national private TV station. After buying two further channels, Berlusconi relocated the station to central Milan in 1977 and began broadcasting over the airwaves.

=== Fininvest ===
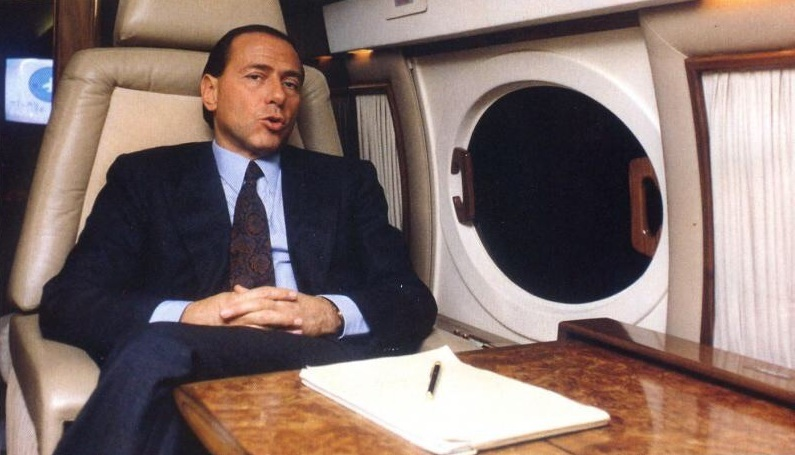
Berlusconi in his private jet aircraft in the 1980s

In 1975, Berlusconi founded his first media group, Fininvest. In 1978 he joined the Propaganda Due masonic lodge. In the five years leading up to 1983, he earned some 113 billion Italian lire (€58.3 million). The funding sources are still unknown because of a complex system of holding companies, despite investigations conducted by various prosecutors.

Fininvest soon expanded into a country-wide network of local TV stations which had similar programming, forming, in effect, a single national network. At the time, laws permitted only the national broadcaster RAI to operate throughout the country, and this was seen as an effort to circumvent the state monopoly. Prior to 1974, Italian television was entirely under state ownership. Despite the landmark 1976 ruling by the Constitutional Court of Italy (decision no. 202/1976), which allowed private entities to operate local television stations, the state maintained prohibitions on live broadcasting and private news channels. Berlusconi was the first to successfully bypass these restrictions by distributing simultaneously pre-recorded broadcasts across multiple local stations, effectively creating the impression of a national live television network.

In 1980, Berlusconi founded Italy's first private national network, Canale 5, followed shortly thereafter by Italia 1, which was bought from the Rusconi family in 1982, and Rete 4, which was bought from Mondadori in 1984. He then launched three international sister networks: La Cinq (1986, France), Tele 5 (1988, West Germany), and Telecinco (1989, Spain). La Cinq and Tele 5 ceased operations in 1992 and were later replaced by La Cinquième and DSF, respectively.

Berlusconi created the first and only Italian commercial TV empire. He was assisted by his connections to Bettino Craxi, secretary-general of the Italian Socialist Party and also the prime minister of Italy at that time, whose government passed, on 20 October 1984, an emergency decree legalising the nationwide transmissions made by Berlusconi's television stations. This was in response to judgements on 16 October 1984, in Turin, Pescara, and Rome, enforcing a law that previously restricted nationwide broadcasting to RAI, which had ordered these private networks to cease transmitting.

After political turmoil in 1985, the decree was approved definitively; for some years, Berlusconi's three channels remained in legal limbo and were not allowed to broadcast news and political commentary. They were elevated to the status of full national TV channels in 1990 by the Mammì law, named after Oscar Mammì. In 1987, it bought out home video distributor Domovideo, in a seesaw contest with Vincenzo Romagnoli.

In 1995, Berlusconi sold a portion of his media holdings, first to the German media group Kirch Group (now bankrupt) and then by public offer. In 1999, Berlusconi expanded his media interests by forming a partnership with Kirch called the Epsilon MediaGroup. On 9 July 2011, a Milan court ordered Fininvest to pay 560 million euros in damages to Compagnie Industriali Riunite in a long-running legal dispute.

On 5 August 2016, Fininvest announced the signing of a preliminary agreement to sell all of their shares of AC Milan to Sino-Europe Sports Investment Management Changxing Co.Ltd. The deal was scheduled to be finalised by the end of 2016. On 13 April 2017, Berlusconi sold Milan to Rossoneri Sport Investment Lux for a total of €830 million after a 31-year reign.

== Political career ==
Berlusconi rapidly rose to the forefront of Italian politics in January 1994, forming a new party called Forza Italia. He was elected to the Chamber of Deputies for the first time and appointed as prime minister following the 1994 Italian general election, when Forza Italia gained a majority in the Chamber of Deputies less than three months after having been launched. His cabinet collapsed after nine months due to internal disagreements among the coalition parties, and he was succeeded as prime minister by Lamberto Dini. In the 1996 Italian general election, Berlusconi was defeated by the centre-left candidate Romano Prodi. In the 2001 Italian general election, he was again the centre-right candidate for prime minister and won against the centre-left candidate Francesco Rutelli. Berlusconi then formed his second and third cabinets, until 2006. Berlusconi was the leader of the centre-right coalition in the 2006 Italian general election, which he lost by a very narrow margin, his opponent again being Prodi. He was re-elected in the 2008 Italian general election following the collapse of the Second Prodi government and sworn in for the third time as prime minister on 8 May 2008.

After losing his majority in parliament amid growing fiscal problems related to the European debt crisis, the resignation of Berlusconi as prime minister came on 16 November 2011. Berlusconi led the People of Freedom and its right-wing allies in the campaign for the 2013 Italian general election. Although he initially planned to run for a fifth term as prime minister, as part of the agreement with the Lega Nord, he would instead plan to lead the coalition without becoming prime minister. Berlusconi's centre-right coalition gained 29% of votes, ranking second, after the centre-left coalition Italy Common Good led by Pier Luigi Bersani. Subsequently, Berlusconi's allies supported the Letta Cabinet headed by Enrico Letta of the Democratic Party, together with the centrist Civic Choice of former prime minister Mario Monti.

Berlusconi was criticised for his electoral coalitions with right-wing populist parties (Lega Nord and the National Alliance) and for apologetic remarks about Mussolini; he also officially apologised for Italy's actions in Libya during colonial rule. While in power, Berlusconi maintained ownership of Mediaset, the largest media company in Italy, and was criticised for his dominance of the Italian media. His leadership was also undermined by sex scandals.

=== Beginnings ===
Berlusconi entered politics in 1994, reportedly admitting to Indro Montanelli and Enzo Biagi that he was forced to do so to avoid imprisonment. He served as prime minister of Italy from 1994 to 1995, 2001 to 2006, and 2008 to 2011. His career was racked with controversies and trials; among these was his failure to honour his promise to sell his personal assets in Mediaset, the largest television broadcaster in Italy, to dispel any perceived conflicts of interest.

In the early 1990s, the five governing parties known as the Pentapartito, including Christian Democracy (Italian: Democrazia Cristiana), the Italian Socialist Party, the Italian Social-Democratic Party, the Italian Republican Party and the Italian Liberal Party, lost much of their electoral strength almost overnight due to a large number of judicial investigations concerning the financial corruption of many of their foremost members in the Mani Pulite affair. This led to a general expectation that upcoming elections would be won by the Democratic Party of the Left, the heirs to the former Italian Communist Party, and their Alliance of Progressives coalition unless an alternative arose. On 26 January 1994, Berlusconi announced his decision to enter politics, in his own words to "enter the field", presenting his own political party, Forza Italia, on a platform focused on defeating communists. His political aim was to convince the voters of the Pentapartito, who were shocked and confused by Mani Pulite scandals, that Forza Italia offered both a fresh uniqueness and the continuation of the pro-Western free-market policies followed by Italy since the end of World War II. Shortly after he decided to enter the political arena, investigators into the Mani Pulite affair were said to be close to issuing warrants for the arrest of Berlusconi and senior executives of his business group. During his political career, Berlusconi repeatedly stated that the Mani Pulite investigations were led by communist prosecutors who wanted to establish a Soviet-style government in Italy.

=== 1994 electoral victory ===
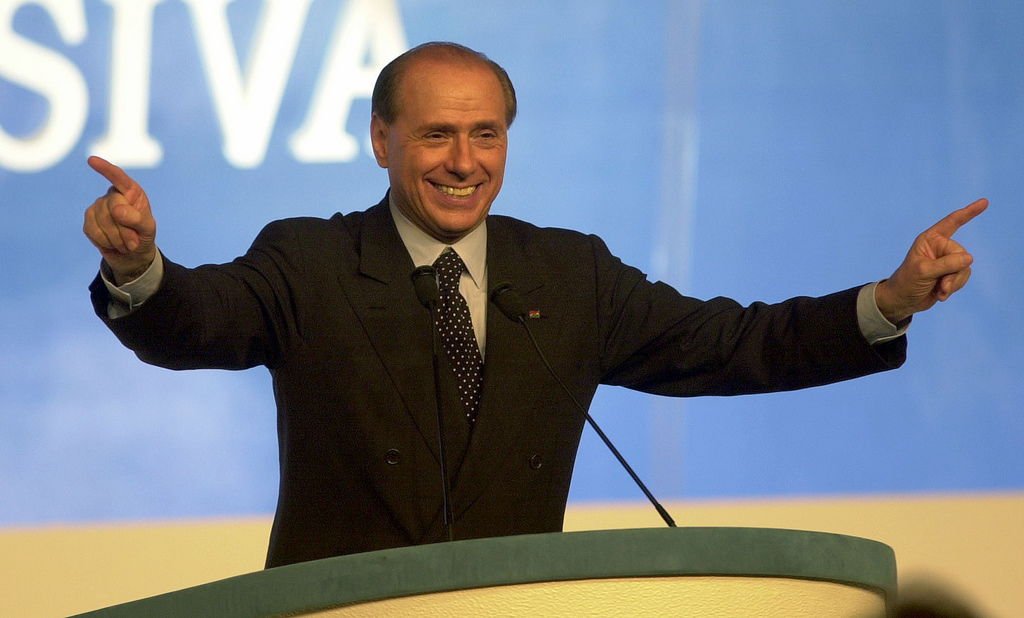
Berlusconi during a Forza Italia rally in 1994

To win the March 1994 general election, Berlusconi formed two separate electoral alliances: Pole of Freedoms (Polo delle Libertà) with Lega Nord (Northern League) in northern Italian districts, and another, the Pole of Good Government (Polo del Buon Governo), with the National Alliance (Alleanza Nazionale), heir to the Italian Social Movement, in central and southern regions. In a pragmatic move, he did not ally with the latter in the North because Lega Nord disliked them. Consequently, Forza Italia was allied with two parties that were not allied with each other.

Berlusconi launched a massive campaign of electoral advertisements on his three TV networks and prepared his top advertising salesmen with seminars and screen tests, of whom 50 were subsequently elected despite an absence of legislative experience. He subsequently won the elections, with Forza Italia garnering 21% of the popular vote, more than any other single party. One of the most significant promises that he made to secure victory was that his government would create "one million more jobs". He was appointed prime minister in 1994, but his term in office was short because of the inherent contradictions in his coalition: the League, a regional party with a strong electoral base in northern Italy, was at that time fluctuating between federalist and separatist positions and the National Alliance was a nationalist party that had yet to renounce neo-fascism at the time.

=== Fall of the Berlusconi I Cabinet ===
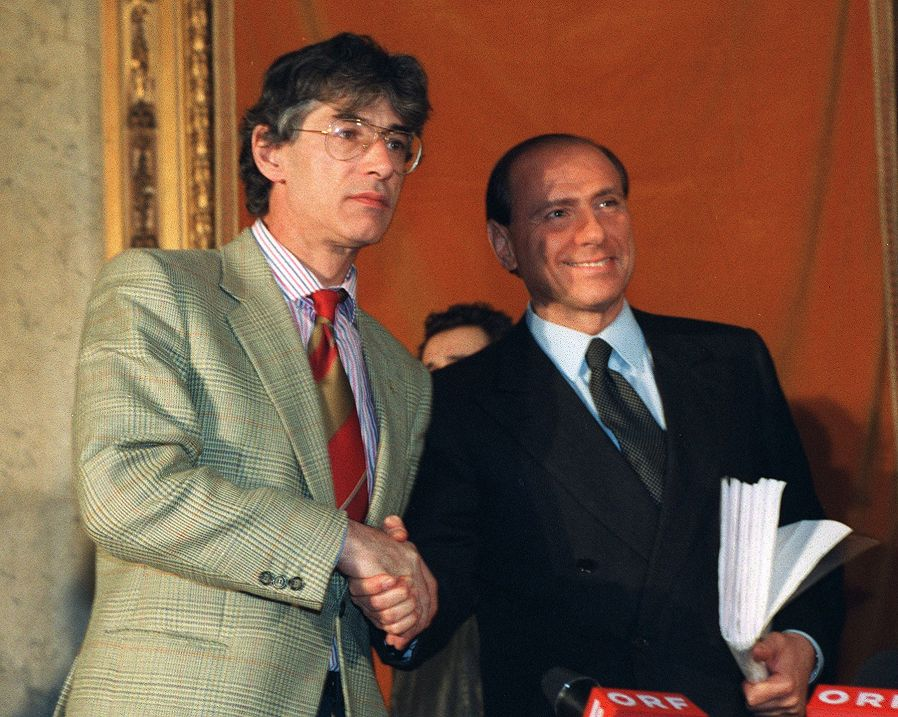
Berlusconi and Umberto Bossi in 1997

In December 1994, following the leaking to the press of news of a fresh investigation by Milan magistrates, Umberto Bossi, leader of the Lega Nord, left the coalition claiming that the electoral pact had not been respected. This in turn forced Berlusconi to resign from office. Lega Nord also resented the fact that many of its MPs had switched to Forza Italia, allegedly lured by promises of more prestigious portfolios. In 1998, various articles attacking Berlusconi were published by Lega Nord's official newspaper La Padania, with titles such as "La Fininvest è nata da Cosa Nostra" ('Fininvest [Berlusconi's principal company] was founded by the Mafia').

Berlusconi remained as caretaker prime minister for a little over a month until his replacement by a technocratic government headed by Lamberto Dini. Dini had been a key minister in the Berlusconi cabinet, and Berlusconi said the only way he would support a technocratic government would be if Dini headed it. In the end, Dini was supported by most of the opposition parties, but not by Forza Italia and Lega Nord. In 1996, Berlusconi and his coalition lost the elections and were replaced by a centre-left government led by Romano Prodi.

=== 2001 electoral victory ===
In 2001, Berlusconi ran again, as leader of the right-wing coalition House of Freedoms (La Casa delle Libertà), which included the Union of Christian and Centre Democrats, Lega Nord, the National Alliance, and other parties. Berlusconi's success in the May 2001 general election led to him becoming prime minister once more, with the coalition receiving 49.6% of the vote for the Chamber of Deputies and 42.5% for the Senate of the Republic.

On the television interview programme Porta a Porta, during the last days of the electoral campaign, Berlusconi created a powerful impression on the public by undertaking to sign the Contratto con gli Italiani (Contract with the Italians), an idea copied by his advisor Luigi Crespi from Newt Gingrich's Contract with America introduced six weeks before the 1994 US elections. This was considered to be a creative masterstroke in his 2001 bid for prime ministership. Berlusconi committed in this contract to improving several aspects of the Italian economy and life, and promised to not stand for re-election in 2006 if he failed to honour at least four of these five promises. Firstly, he undertook to simplify the complex Italian national tax system by introducing just two income tax rates (33% for those earning over 100,000 euros, and 23% for anyone earning less than that figure: anyone earning less than 11,000 euros a year would not be taxed). Secondly, he promised to halve the unemployment rate. Thirdly, he committed to financing and developing a massive new public works programme. Fourthly, he promised to raise the minimum monthly pension rate to 516 euros. Fifthly, he would reduce crime by introducing police officers to patrol all local zones and areas in Italy's major cities.

=== Berlusconi II Cabinet ===
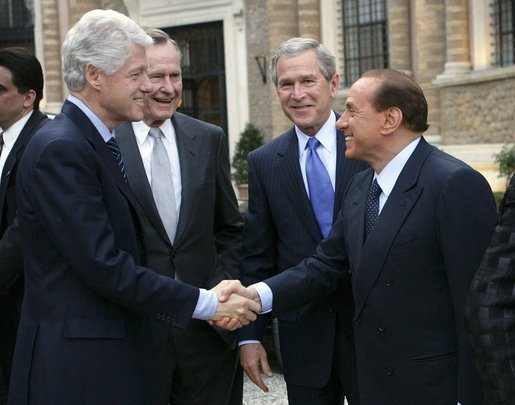
Berlusconi with US president George W. Bush and former presidents Bill Clinton and George H. W. Bush

Opposition parties claim Berlusconi was not able to achieve the goals he promised in his Contratto con gli Italiani. Some of his partners in government, especially the National Alliance and the Union of Christian and Centre Democrats, admitted the Government fell short of the promises made in the agreement, attributing the failure to an unforeseeable downturn in global economic conditions. Berlusconi himself consistently asserted that he achieved all the goals of the agreement, and said his Government provided un miracolo continuo (a continuous miracle) that made all 'earlier governments pale' (by comparison). He attributed the widespread failure to recognise these achievements to a campaign of mystification and vilification in the print media, asserting that 85% of newspapers were opposed to him. Luca Ricolfi, an independent analyst, held that Berlusconi had managed to deliver only one promise out of five, the one concerning minimum pension rates. According to Ricolfi, the other four promises were not honoured, in particular the undertakings on tax simplification and crime reduction.

=== Subsequent elections ===
The House of Freedoms did not do as well in the 2003 local elections as it did in the 2001 national elections. In common with many other European governing groups, in the 2004 elections to the European Parliament, gained 43.37% support. Forza Italia's support was also reduced from 29.5% to 21.0% (in the 1999 European elections Forza Italia had 25.2%). As an outcome of these results, the other coalition parties, whose electoral results were more satisfactory, asked Berlusconi and Forza Italia for greater influence on the government's political line.

=== Berlusconi III Cabinet ===
In the regional elections on 3–4 April 2005, centre-left candidates for regional presidencies won in 11 out of 13 regions where control of local governments and presidencies were at stake. Berlusconi's coalition held only two of the regions (Lombardy and Veneto) up for re-election. Three parties, Union of Christian and Centre Democrats, National Alliance and New Italian Socialist Party, threatened to withdraw from the Berlusconi government. Berlusconi after some hesitation, then presented to the president of Italy a request for the dissolution of his government on 20 April. On 23 April, he formed a new government with the same allies, reshuffling ministers and amending the government programme. A key point demanded by the Union of Christian and Centre Democrats and to a lesser extent by the National Alliance for their continued support was that the strong focus on tax reduction be reduced.

=== Attempt to reform the Italian constitution ===
A key point in the Berlusconi government's programme was a planned reform of the Italian constitution, which Berlusconi considered to be inspired by the Soviet Union, an issue on which the coalition parties themselves initially had significantly different opinions. Lega Nord insisted on a federalist reform (devolution of more power to the regions) as a condition for remaining in the coalition. The National Alliance party pushed for a strong premiership (more powers to the prime minister).

Difficulties in negotiating an agreement caused some internal unrest in the Berlusconi government in 2003, but they were mostly overcome and the law including devolution of powers to the regions, Federal Senate, and strong premiership, was passed by the Senate in April 2004; it was slightly modified by the Chamber of Deputies in October 2004, and again in October 2005, and finally approved by the Senate on 16 November 2005, with a narrow majority. Approval in a referendum is necessary to amend the Italian constitution without a qualified two-thirds parliamentary majority. The referendum was held on 25–26 June 2006 and resulted in the rejection of the constitutional reform, with 61.3% of voters casting ballots against it.

=== 2006 general election and opposition ===
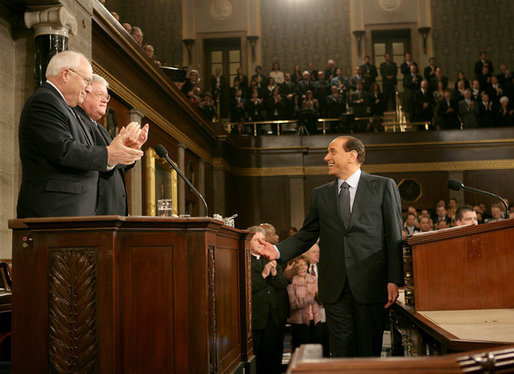
Berlusconi addressing a joint session of the US Congress in 2006

Operating under a new electoral law written unilaterally by the governing parties with strong criticism from the parliamentary opposition, the April 2006 general election was held. The results of this election handed Romano Prodi's centre-left coalition, known as The Union (Berlusconi's opposition), a very thin majority: 49.8% against 49.7% for the centre-right coalition House of Freedoms in the Lower House, and a two-senator lead in the Senate (158 senators for The Union and 156 for the House of Freedoms). The Court of Cassation subsequently validated the voting procedures and determined that the election process was constitutional. According to the new electoral rules, The Union, nicknamed "The Soviet Union" by Berlusconi, with a margin of only 25,224 votes (out of over 38 million voters) won 348 seats (compared to 281 for the House of Freedoms) in the lower house given to whichever coalition of parties was awarded more votes as a result of the majority bonus system.

This electoral law, approved shortly before the election by Berlusconi's coalition in an attempt to improve their chances of winning the election, led to the coalition's defeat and gave Prodi the chance to form a new cabinet. Prodi's coalition government consisted of a large number of smaller parties. If only one of these nine parties that formed The Union withdrew its support to Prodi, his government would have collapsed. This situation was also the result of the new electoral system. Centrist parties such as the Union of Christian and Centre Democrats immediately conceded The Union's victory, while other parties, such as Berlusconi's Forza Italia and the Northern League, refused to accept its validity, right up until 2 May 2006, when Berlusconi submitted his resignation to then President of the Republic Carlo Azeglio Ciampi.

=== 2008 electoral victory ===
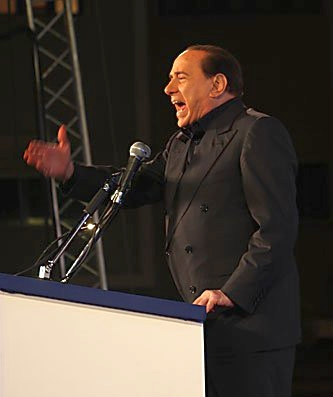
Berlusconi addressing a crowd during a PdL meeting in 2008

In the run-up to the 2006 general election, there had been talk among some of the coalition members of the House of Freedoms about a possible merger into a "united party of moderates and reformers". Forza Italia, the National Alliance of Gianfranco Fini, and the Union of Christian and Centre Democrats of Pier Ferdinando Casini all seemed interested in the project. Soon after the election, Casini started to distance his party from its historical allies. On 2 December 2006, during a major demonstration of the centre-right in Rome against the Prodi II Cabinet, Berlusconi proposed the foundation of a Freedom Party, arguing that the people and voters of the different political movements aligned to the demonstration were all part of a people of freedom.

On 18 November 2007, after claiming the collection of more than 7 million signatures (including that of Umberto Bossi) demanding that then President of the Republic Giorgio Napolitano call a fresh election, Berlusconi announced from the running board of a car in a crowded Piazza San Babila in Milan that Forza Italia would soon merge or transform into The People of Freedom, also known as the PdL (Il Popolo della Libertà). Berlusconi also stated that this new political movement could include the participation of other parties. Both supporters and critics of the new party called Berlusconi's announcement "the running board revolution" (Italian: la rivoluzione del predellino).

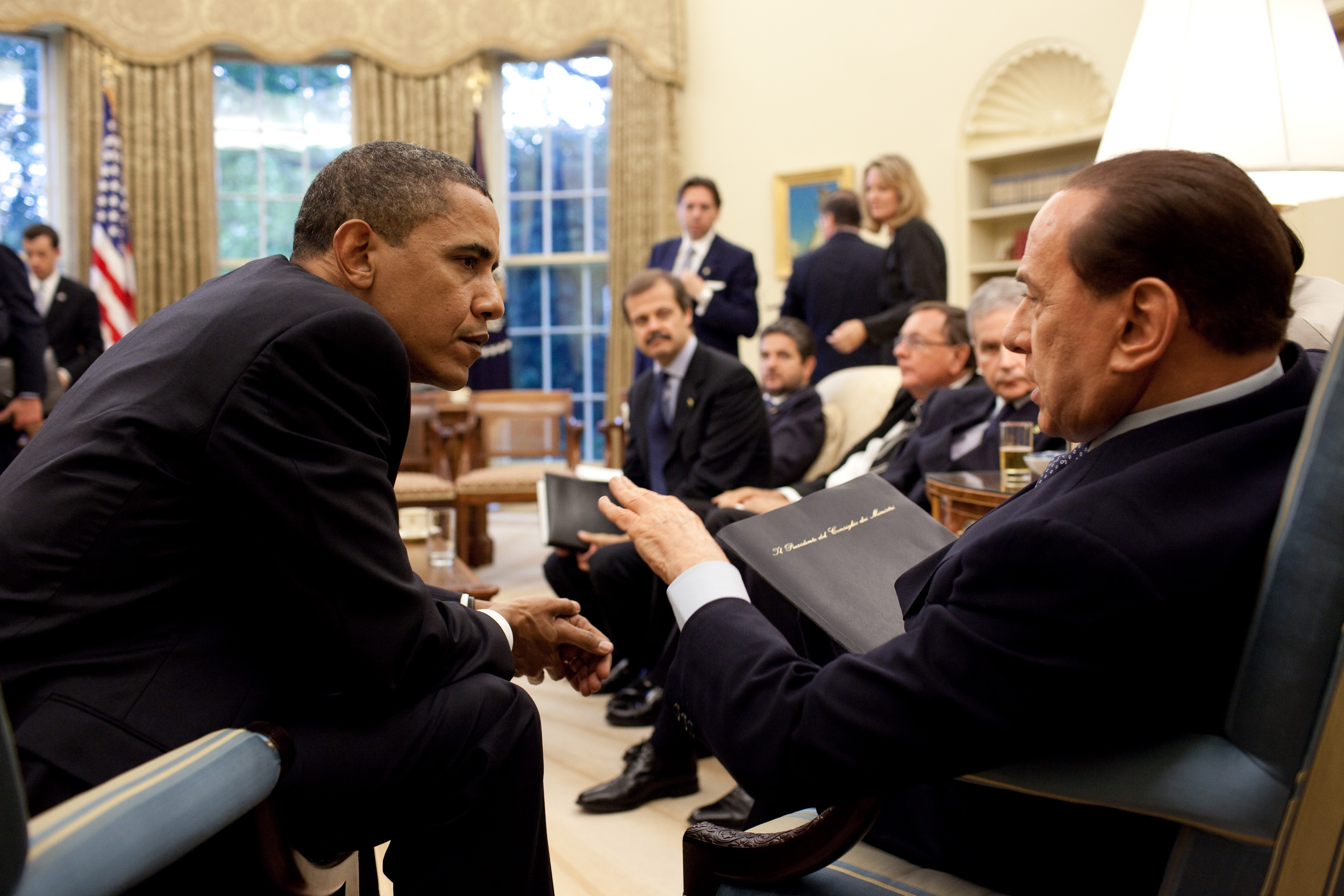
Berlusconi with US president Barack Obama in the Oval Office, 2009

After the sudden fall of the Prodi II Cabinet on 24 January, the break-up of The Union, and the subsequent political crisis, which paved the way for a fresh general election in April 2008, Berlusconi, Gianfranco Fini and other party leaders finally agreed on 8 February 2008 to form the PdL joint list, allied with Lega Nord of Bossi and the Movement for Autonomy of Raffaele Lombardo.

In the snap elections held on 13–14 April 2008, this coalition won against Walter Veltroni's centre-left coalition in both houses of the Italian Parliament. In the 315-member Senate of the Republic, Berlusconi's coalition won 174 seats to Veltroni's 134. In the lower house, Berlusconi's conservative bloc led by a margin of 9% of the vote: 46.5% (344 seats) to 37.5% (246 seats). Berlusconi capitalised on discontent over the nation's stagnating economy and the unpopularity of Prodi's government. His declared top priorities were to remove piles of rubbish from the streets of Naples and to improve the state of the Italian economy, which had under-performed the rest of the eurozone for years. He also said he was open to working with the opposition, and pledged to fight tax avoidance and tax evasion, reform the judicial system and reduce public debt. He intended to reduce the number of cabinet ministers to 12. Berlusconi and his ministers (Berlusconi IV Cabinet) were sworn in on 8 May 2008.

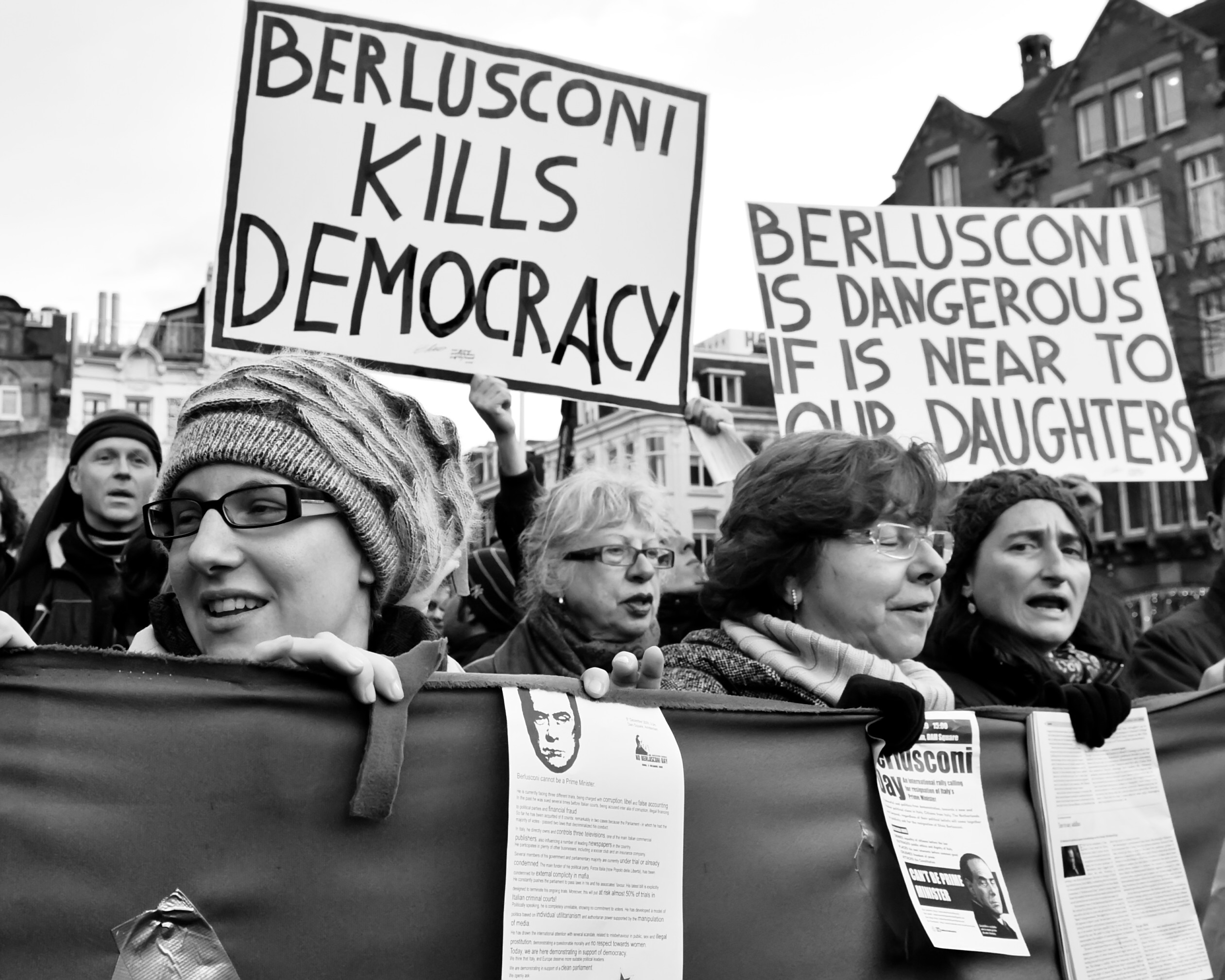
Anti-Berlusconi demonstration, held during his visit to Amsterdam in 2009

On 21 November 2008, the National Council of Forza Italia dissolved Forza Italia and established the PdL, whose inauguration took place on 27 March 2009, the 15th anniversary of Berlusconi's first electoral victory. While Forza Italia had never held a formal party congress to formulate its rules, procedures, and democratic balloting for candidates and issues, (since 1994 three party conventions of Forza Italia have been held, all of them resolving to support Berlusconi and reelecting him by acclamation) on 27 March 2009, at the foundation congress of the PdL political movement the statute of the new party was subject to a vote of approval. On 5,820 voting delegates, 5,811 voted in favour, 4 against and 5 abstained. During that political congress Berlusconi was elected as chairman of the PdL by a show of hands. According to the official minutes of the congress the result favoured Berlusconi, with 100 per cent of the delegates voting for him.

=== The People of Freedom split ===
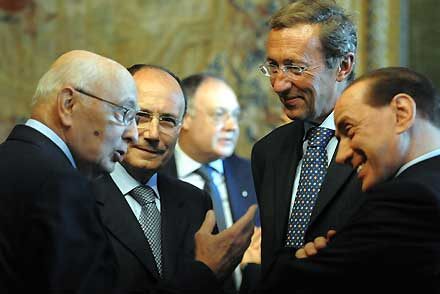
Berlusconi with Gianfranco Fini, Renato Schifani and then President of the Republic Giorgio Napolitano in 2009

Between 2009 and 2010, Gianfranco Fini, former leader of the national conservative National Alliance (AN) and President of the Italian Chamber of Deputies, became a vocal critic of the leadership of Berlusconi. Fini departed from party's majority line on several issues but, most of all, he was a proponent of a more structured party organisation. His criticism was aimed at the leadership style of Berlusconi, who tends to rely on his personal charisma to lead the party from the centre and supports a less structured form of party, a movement-party that organises itself only at election times.

On 15 April 2010, an association named Generation Italy was launched to better represent Fini's views within the party and push for a different form of party organisation. On 22 April 2010 the National Committee of the PdL convened in Rome for the first time in a year. The conflict between Fini and Berlusconi was covered live on television. At the end of the day, a resolution proposed by Berlusconi's loyalists was put before the assembly and approved by a landslide margin. On 29 July 2010, the party executive released a document in which Fini was described as "incompatible" with the political line of the PdL and unable to perform his job of President of the Chamber of Deputies in a neutral way. Berlusconi asked Fini to step down, and the executive proposed the suspension from party membership of three MPs who had harshly criticised Berlusconi and accused some party members of criminal offences.

As response, Fini and his followers formed their own groups in both chambers under the name of Future and Freedom (FLI). It was soon clear that FLI would leave the PdL and become an independent party. On 7 November, during a convention in Bastia Umbra, Fini asked Berlusconi to step down from his post of prime minister and proposed a new government including the Union of the Centre (UdC). A few days later, the four FLI members of the government resigned. On 14 December, FLI voted against Berlusconi in a vote of confidence in the Chamber of Deputies, a vote nonetheless won by Berlusconi by 314 to 311.

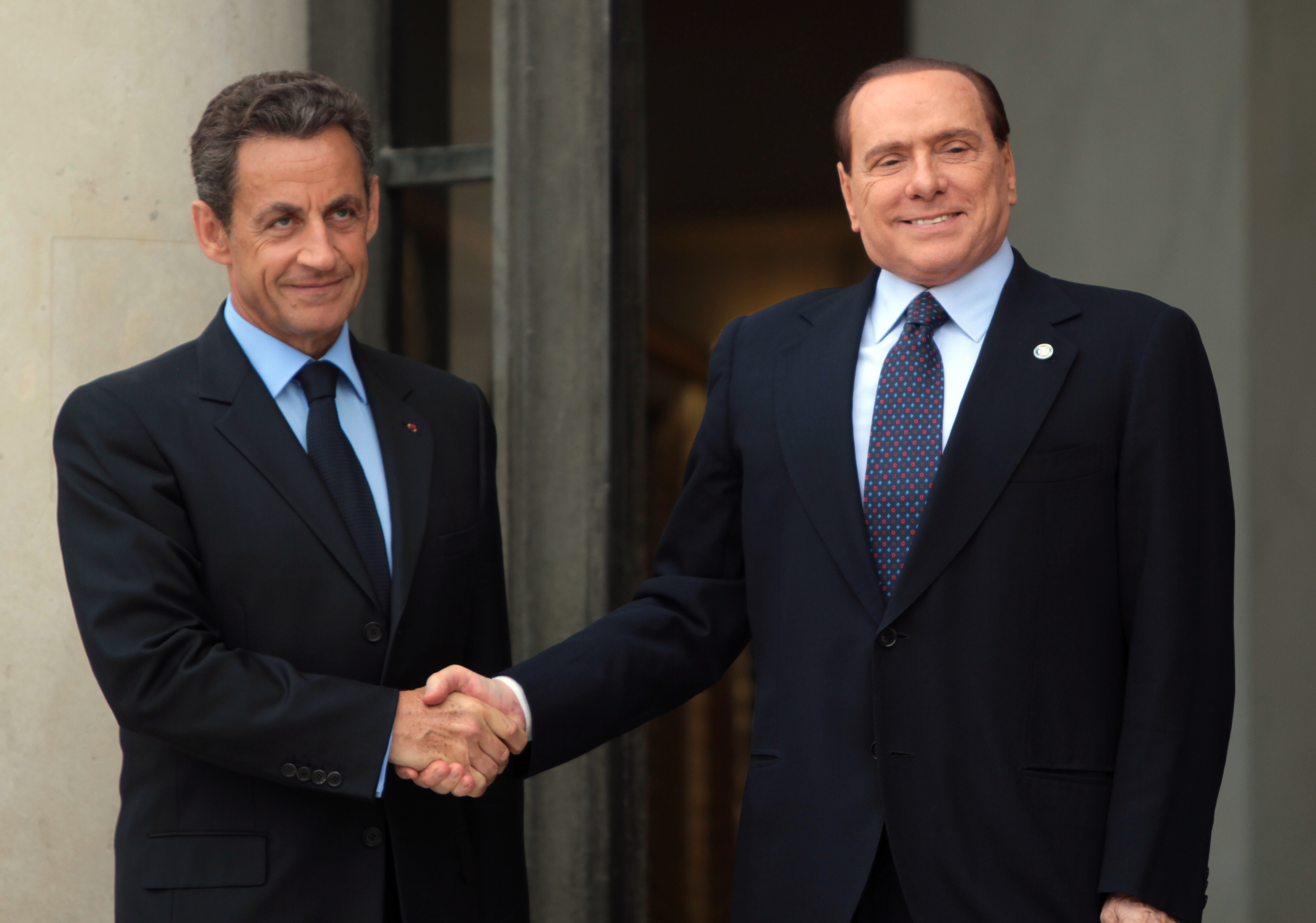
Berlusconi with French president Nicolas Sarkozy in 2011

In May 2011, PdL suffered a big blow in local elections. Particularly painful was the loss of Milan, Berlusconi's hometown and party stronghold. In response to this and to conflicts within party ranks, Angelino Alfano, the Justice minister, was chosen as national secretary in charge of reorganising and renewing the party. The appointment of 40-year-old Alfano, a former Christian Democrat and later leader of Forza Italia in Sicily, was unanimously decided by the party executive. On 1 July, the National Council modified the party's constitution and Alfano was elected secretary almost unanimously. In his acceptance speech, Alfano proposed the introduction of primaries.

=== Resignation ===
On 10 October 2011, the Chamber of Deputies rejected the law on the budget of the state proposed by the government. As a result of this event, Berlusconi moved for a confidence vote in the Chamber on 14 October, he won the vote with just 316 votes to 310, minimum required to retain a majority. An increasing number of Deputies continued to cross the floor and join the opposition and on 8 November the Chamber approved the law on the budget of the State previously rejected but with only 308 votes, while opposition parties did not participate in the vote to highlight that Berlusconi lost his majority. After the vote, Berlusconi announced his resignation after Parliament passed economic reforms. Among other things, his perceived failure to tackle Italy's debt crisis with an estimated debt sum of €1.9 trillion ($2.6 trillion) had urged Berlusconi to leave office. The popularity of this decision was reflected in the fact that while he was resigning crowds sang the Hallelujah Chorus of George Frideric Handel's "Messiah", complete with some vocal accompaniment; there was also dancing in the streets outside the Quirinal Palace, the official residence of the President of Italy, where Berlusconi went to tender his resignation.

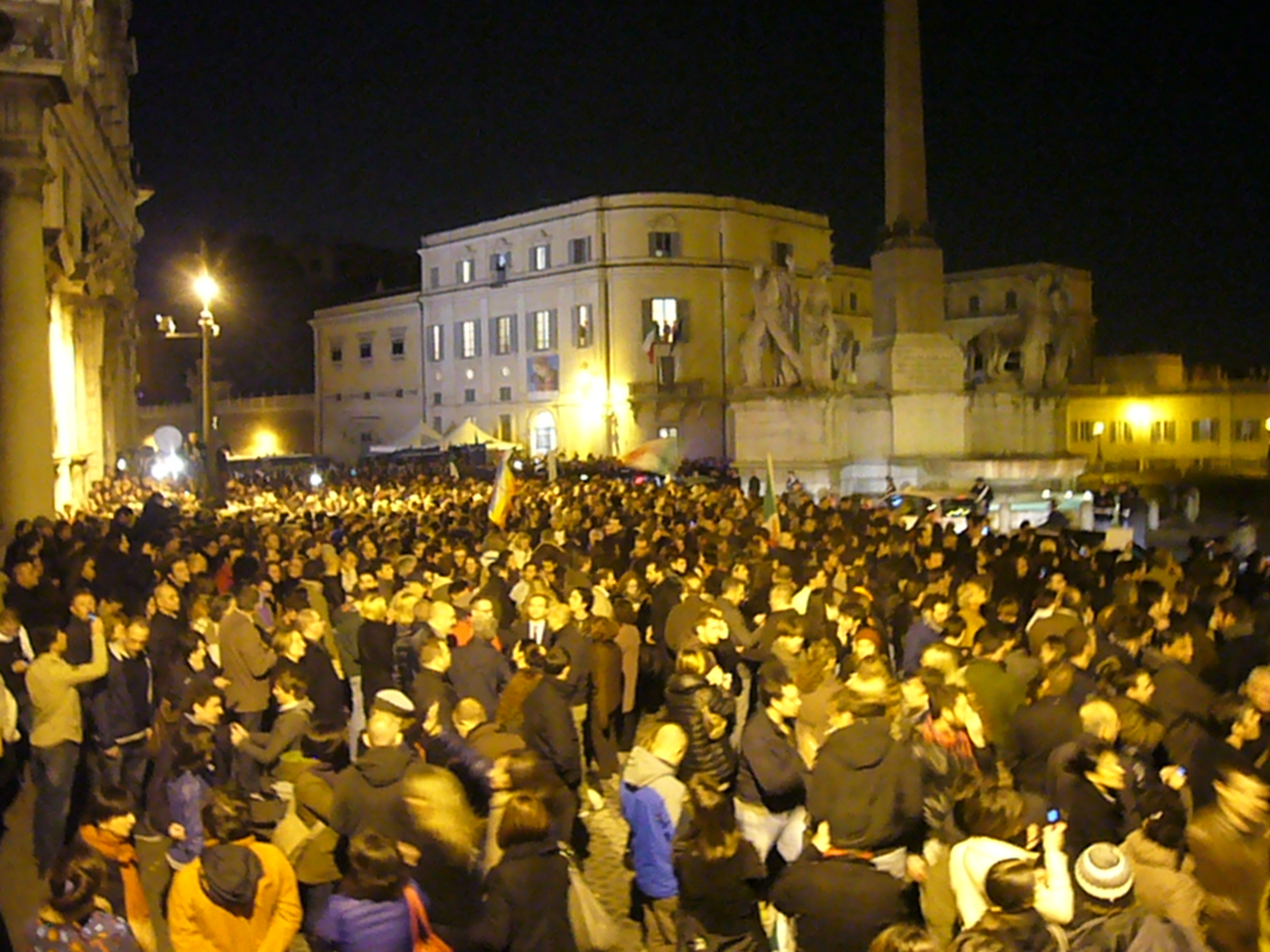
Crowd in front of Quirinal Palace during Berlusconi's resignation as prime minister

Austerity measures were passed, raising €59.8 billion from spending cuts and tax raises, including freezing public-sector salaries until 2014 and gradually increasing the retirement age for women in the private sector from 60 in 2014 to 65 in 2026. The resignation also came at a difficult time for Berlusconi, as he was involved in numerous trials for corruption, fraud and sex offences. He was often found guilty in lower courts, but used loopholes in Italy's legal system to evade incarceration.

Berlusconi had failed to meet some of his pre-election promises and had failed to prevent economic decline and introduce serious reforms. Many believed that the problems and doubts over Berlusconi's leadership and his coalition were one of the factors that contributed to market anxieties over an imminent Italian financial disaster, which could have a potentially catastrophic effect on the 17-nation eurozone and the world economy. Many critics of Berlusconi accused him of using his power primarily to protect his own business ventures. Umberto Bossi, leader of Lega Nord, a partner in Berlusconi's right-wing coalition, was quoted as informing reporters outside parliament, "We asked the prime minister to step aside."

On 12 November 2011, after a final meeting with his cabinet, Berlusconi met President Giorgio Napolitano at the Palazzo del Quirinale to tend his resignation. As he arrived at the presidential residence, a hostile crowd gathered with banners insulting Berlusconi and throwing coins at the car. After his resignation, the booing and jeering continued as he left in his convoy, with the public shouting words such as "buffoon", "dictator" and "mafioso". Following Berlusconi's resignation, Mario Monti formed a new government that would remain in office until the next scheduled elections in 2013.

In the following years Berlusconi often expressed his point of view regarding his resignation in 2011. He accused Angela Merkel, Nicolas Sarkozy, Christine Lagarde and Giorgio Napolitano, along with other global economic and financial powers, of having plotted against him and forcing him to resign, because he had refused to accept a loan from the International Monetary Fund, which according to him, would have sold the country to the IMF.

=== 2013 general election ===
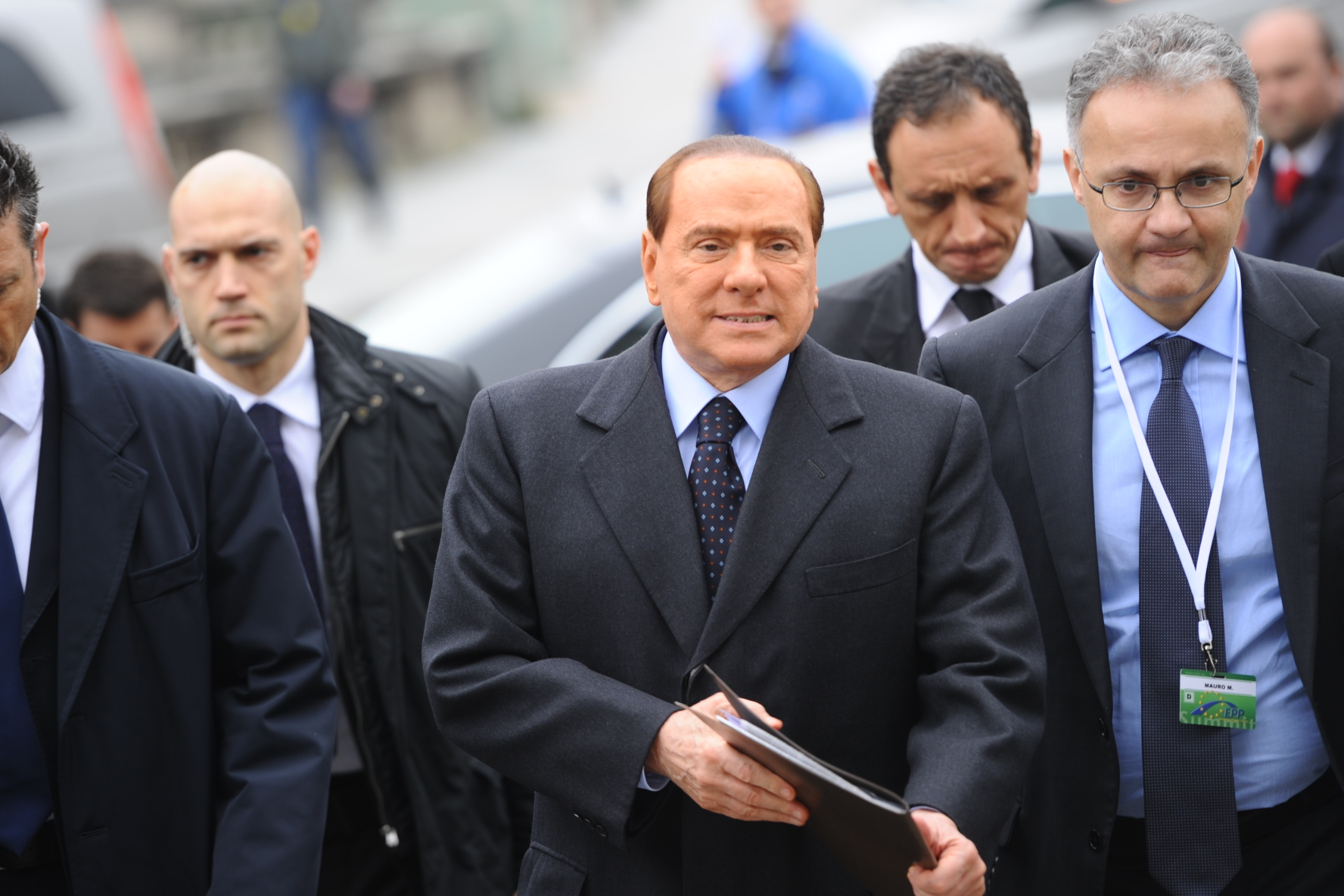
Berlusconi at the 2012 EPP Summit

In December 2012, Berlusconi announced on television that he would run again to become prime minister of Italy. Berlusconi said his party's platform would include opposition to Mario Monti's economic performance, which he said put Italy into a "recessive spiral without end". On 7 January 2013, Berlusconi announced he had made a coalition agreement (centre-right coalition) with Lega Nord (LN); as part of it, PdL would support Roberto Maroni's bid for the presidency of Lombardy, and he would run as "leader of the coalition", but suggested he could accept a role as Minister of Economy under a cabinet headed by another People of Freedom (PdL) member, such as Angelino Alfano. Later that day, LN leader Maroni confirmed his party would not support Berlusconi being appointed as prime minister in the case of an electoral win. Berlusconi's coalition gained 29.1% of votes and 125 seats in the Chamber of Deputies, 30.7% of votes and 117 seats in the Senate. In April 2013, Berlusconi's PdL announced his support of the Letta government, together with the Democratic Party and the centrist Civic Choice, of former prime minister Mario Monti.

=== Refoundation of Forza Italia and public office ban ===
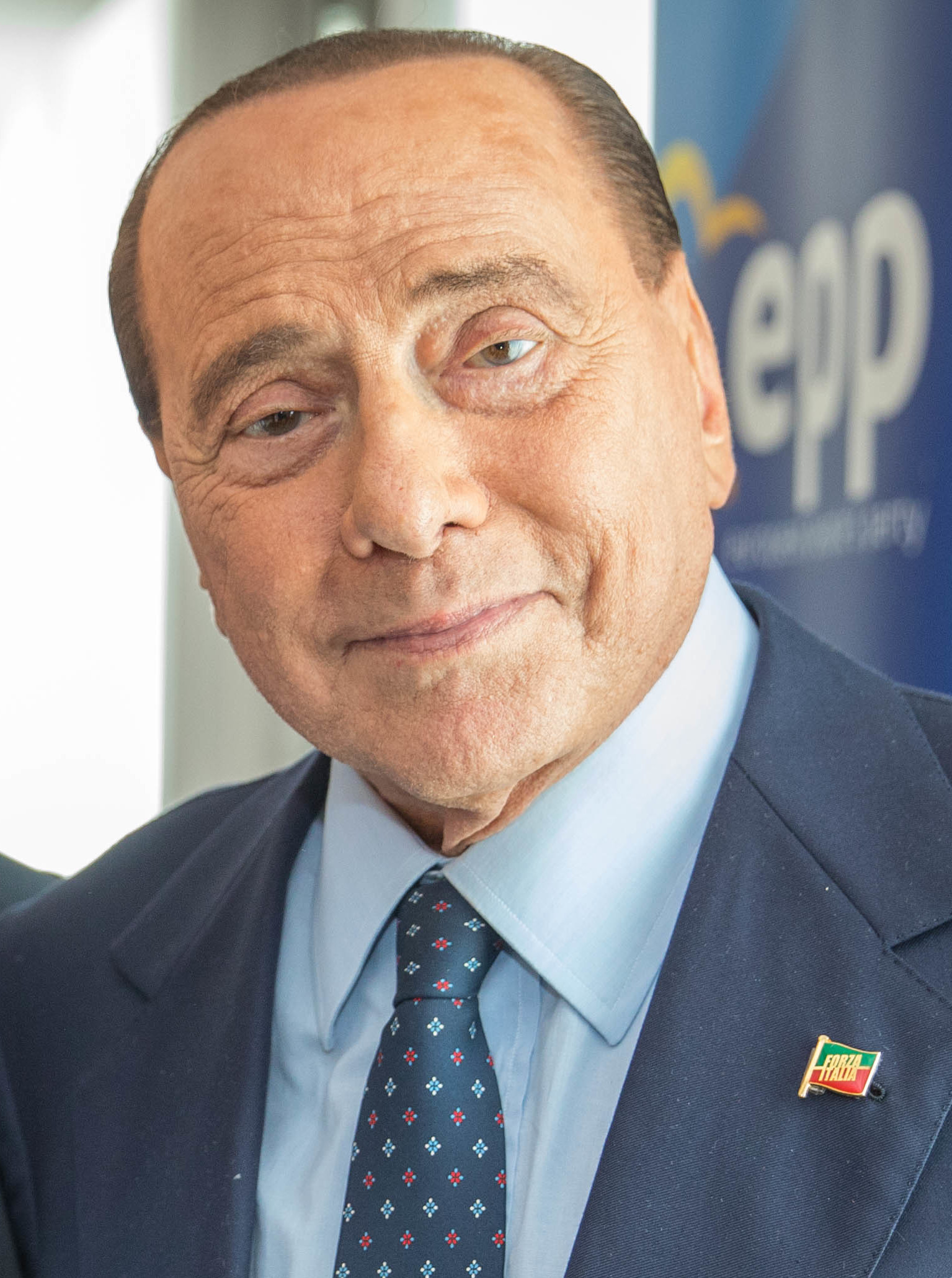
Berlusconi at the 2019 EPP Summit

In June 2013, Berlusconi announced the refoundation of his first party Forza Italia (FI). On 18 September the new party was launched and officially founded on 16 November. After the foundation of Forza Italia, Berlusconi announced that his new party would oppose the grand coalition government of Enrico Letta; the new political position taken by Berlusconi caused dissent in the movement, and the governmental wing of Forza Italia led by Angelino Alfano split from FI and founded a Christian democratic party called New Centre-Right, which supported the Letta Cabinet.

On 1 August 2013, Berlusconi was convicted of tax fraud by the court of final instance, the Supreme Court of Cassation, which confirmed his four-year prison sentence, of which three years are automatically pardoned, along with a public office ban for two years. As his age exceeded 70 years, he was exempted from direct imprisonment; he served his sentence by doing unpaid social community work. Because he was sentenced to a gross imprisonment of more than two years, a new Italian anti-corruption law (named after Paola Severino) resulted in the Senate expelling and barring him from serving in any legislative office for six years. Berlusconi pledged to stay leader of Forza Italia throughout his custodial sentence and public office ban. He was not able to freely campaign for his party.

In March 2017, Berlusconi expressed his intention to run once again as centre-right candidate for the premiership, even if he was banned from public office until 2019; the 2018 Italian general election was his seventh one as the centre-right frontrunner. The general election resulted in Lega per Salvini Premier winning more seats than FI, and no electoral coalition winning an outright majority.

=== Political comeback and election to European Parliament and Senate ===
In January 2019, Berlusconi expressed his intention to run for candidacy in the 2019 European Parliament election in Italy. In the election, Forza Italia received only 8.8% of votes, the worst result in its history. Berlusconi was elected to the Parliament, becoming the oldest member of the assembly. He was a potential nominee in the 2022 Italian presidential election, which was ultimately won by Sergio Mattarella. From 2019 to 2022, Berlusconi had the lowest attendance rate among MEPs with 59%, largely because of months of dealing with symptoms after catching COVID-19 in September 2020. Berlusconi ran in the 2022 Italian election as the leader of Forza Italia, being elected to the Senate for the single-member constituency of Monza, returning to the Italian parliament after ten years.

== Foreign policy ==
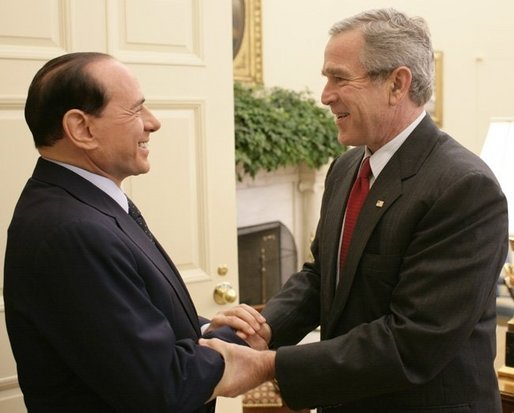
Berlusconi with US president George W. Bush at the White House in 2005

Berlusconi and his cabinets had a strong tendency to support American foreign policies, despite the policy divide between the US and many founding members of the European Union, such as Germany, France, and Belgium during the George W. Bush administration. Under Berlusconi's leadership, Italy also shifted its traditional position on foreign policy, from being one of the most pro-Arab Western countries, towards a greater friendship with Israel and Turkey. This resulted in a rebalancing of relations between all the Mediterranean countries, to reach equal closeness with them. Berlusconi was one of the strongest supporters of Turkey's application to accede to the European Union. To support Turkey's application Berlusconi invited Prime Minister Recep Tayyip Erdoğan to take part in a meeting of the European leaders of Denmark, France, Germany, the Netherlands, Spain, Sweden, and the United Kingdom, gathered in L'Aquila for the 2009 G8 summit. Berlusconi described Saudi Arabia as an important force for stability in the region.

Italy, with Berlusconi in office, became a solid ally of the United States due to his support for the war in Afghanistan and the Iraq War. On 30 January 2003, Berlusconi signed "The letter of the eight" supporting the US preparations for 2003 invasion of Iraq. Italy had some 3,200 troops deployed in Southern Iraq, the third largest contingent there after the American and British forces. When Romano Prodi became Prime Minister, Italian troops were gradually withdrawn. In 2023, he warned of the danger posed to Europe and the Western world by China, saying that, "China is the systemic competitor of the West in the 21st century. China is our real danger for the future."

=== Relations with Russia ===
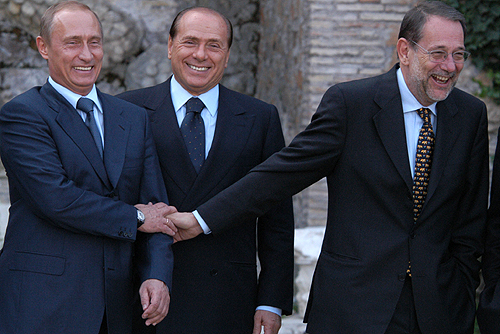
Berlusconi, Russian president Vladimir Putin and EU foreign policy chief Javier Solana at the EU-Russia summit in Rome, 2003

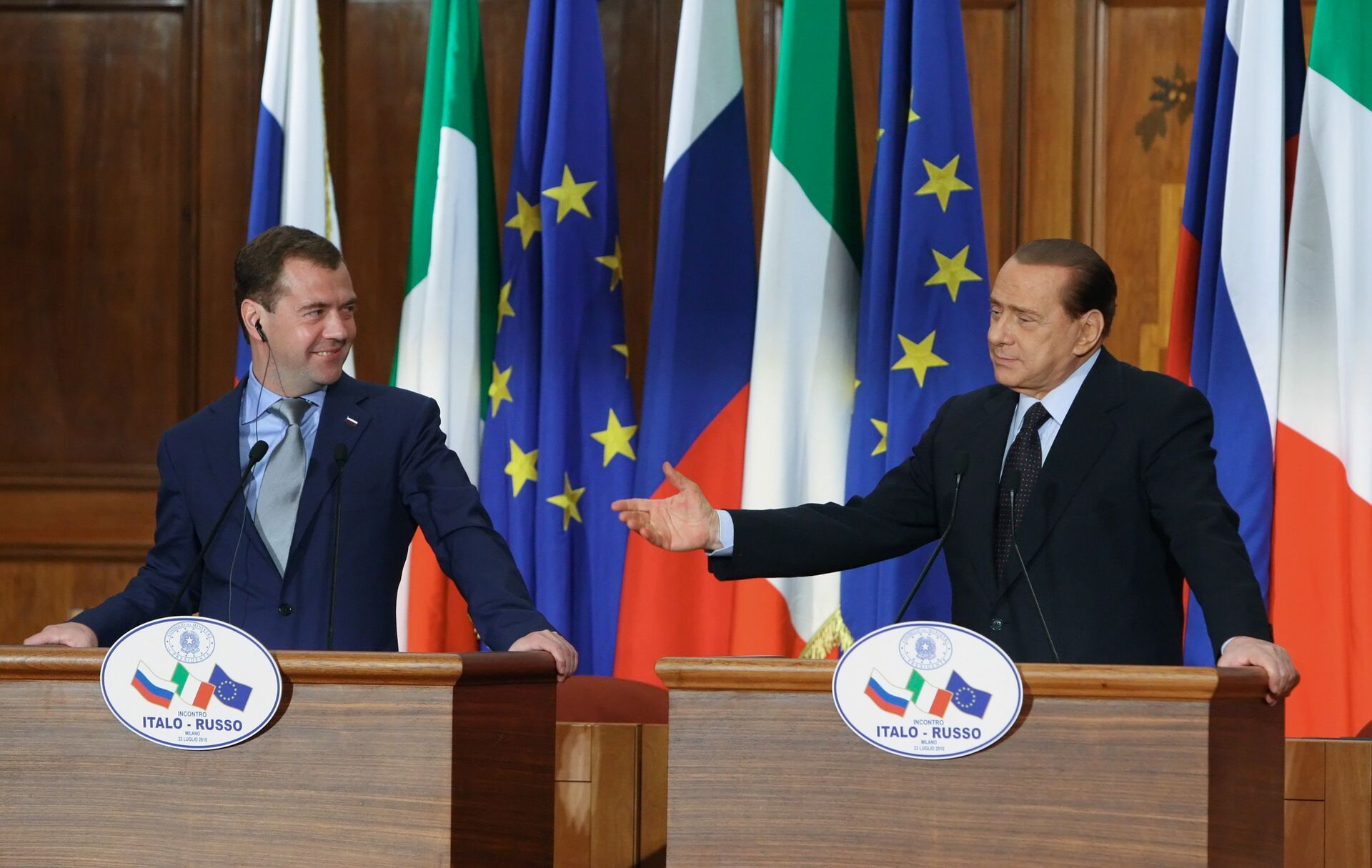
Berlusconi with Russian president Dmitry Medvedev in Italy, 2010

In November 2007, Italy's state-owned energy company Eni signed an agreement with Russian state-owned Gazprom to build the South Stream pipeline. Investigating Italian parliament members discovered that Central Energy Italian Gas Holding (CEIGH), a part of the Centrex Group, was to play a major role in the lucrative agreement. Bruno Mentasti-Granelli, a close friend of Berlusconi, owned 33 per cent of CEIGH. The Italian parliament blocked the contract and accused Berlusconi of having a personal interest in the Eni-Gazprom agreement.

Berlusconi was among the most vocal supporters of closer ties between Russia and the European Union. In an article published in Italian media on 26 May 2002, he said that the next step in Russia's growing integration with the West should be EU membership. Berlusconi had a warm relationship with Vladimir Putin. The two leaders often described their relationship as a close friendship, continuing to organise bilateral meetings even after Berlusconi's resignation in November 2011. In 2015, Berlusconi visited Crimea, which had been illegally annexed by the Russian Federation one year prior: after landing in Yalta, he met with Putin in Sevastopol. Because of this, he was declared persona non grata by the Ukrainian government for three years.

Berlusconi condemned the 2022 Russian invasion of Ukraine, saying he was deeply disappointed by the behaviour of President Putin. On the eve of the 2022 Italian general election, he said that "the Russian troops were supposed to enter, reach Kyiv in a week, replace the Zelensky government with decent people and a week later come back". In September 2022, Berlusconi made another statement at a Forza Italia convention in Venetia defending Putin: the statement was described by Italian media as confused and containing several factual errors, such as stating that Putin had been pressured to invade Ukraine "by his colleagues in the Communist Party". In October 2022, leaked audio recordings revealed Berlusconi expressing dismay at Italy's military support for Ukraine, and blaming Volodymyr Zelenskyy for the 2022 Russian invasion of Ukraine.

=== Relations with Israel ===
Under Berlusconi, Italy was an ally of Israel. Berlusconi was noted for his close and friendly relationship with Israeli prime minister Netanyahu. Netanyahu described Berlusconi as "one of the greatest friends". Berlusconi believed that Israel should be made an EU member. Berlusconi strongly defended Israel in the Israeli–Palestinian conflict, continuing his support for Israel after leaving office. He defended Israel's actions during the Gaza–Israel conflict and called for "effective" sanctions against Iran. However, he said that the construction of Israeli settlements in the occupied West Bank was a "mistake" and "could be an obstacle to peace". While Berlusconi was in office, Israel and Italy negotiated a $1 billion deal whereby Israel builds reconnaissance satellites for Italy, while Israel purchases the M-346 training plane for its air-force.

=== Relations with Belarus ===
Berlusconi visited Alexander Lukashenko in Belarus in 2009. Berlusconi became the first Western leader to visit Lukashenko since Lukashenko came to power in 1994. At a press conference, Berlusconi paid compliments to Lukashenko and said, "Good luck to you and your people, whom I know love you."

=== Cooperation with the Western Balkans ===
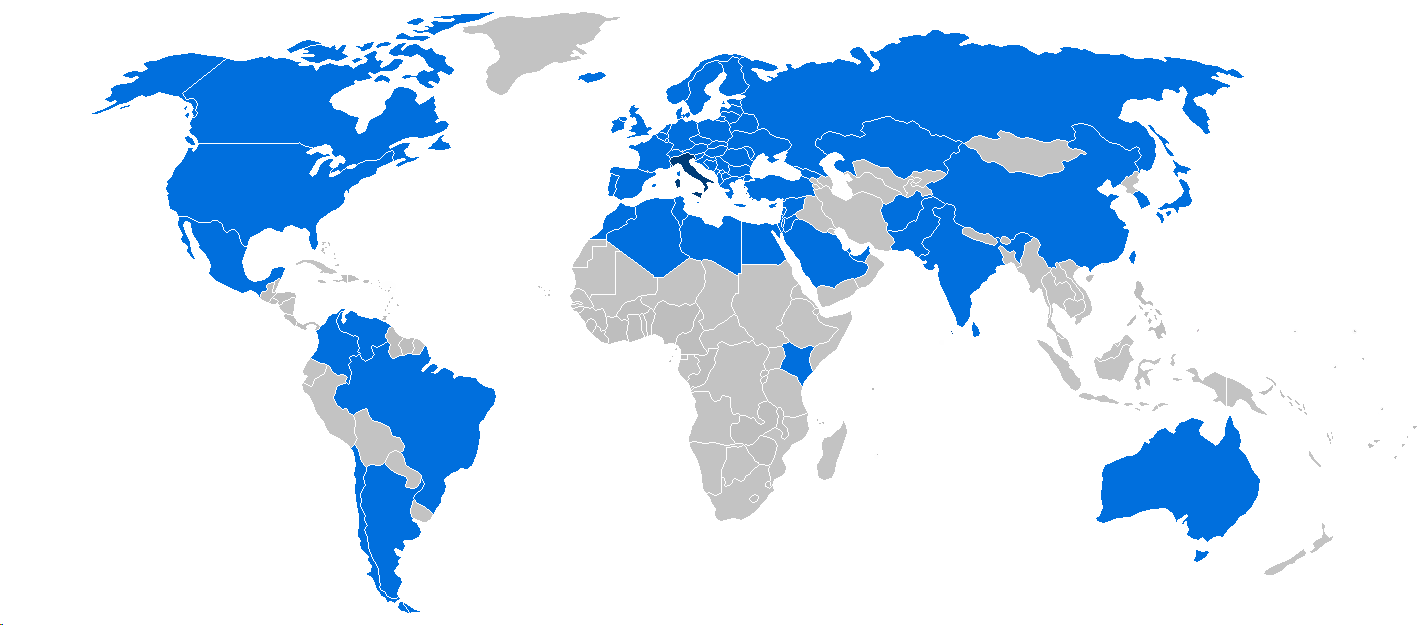
Map of international trips made by Berlusconi as Prime Minister

On 5 April 2009, at the EU-US summit in Prague Berlusconi proposed an eight-point road map to accelerate the Euro-Atlantic integration of the western Balkans. During that summit the Italian Foreign Minister Franco Frattini urged his European colleagues to send "visible and concrete" signs to the countries concerned (Serbia, Kosovo, Bosnia, Montenegro, Croatia, Macedonia, and Albania).

=== Relations with Libya ===
On 30 August 2008, the Libyan leader Muammar Gaddafi and Berlusconi signed a historic cooperation treaty in Benghazi. Under its terms, Italy would pay $5 billion to Libya as compensation for its former military occupation. In exchange, Libya would take measures to combat illegal immigration coming from its shores and boost investment in Italian companies. The treaty was ratified by the Italian government on 6 February 2009, and by Libya on 2 March, during a visit to Tripoli by Berlusconi. Berlusconi apologised for Italy's actions during the Italian colonisation of Libya. In June Gaddafi made his first visit to Rome, where he met Berlusconi, President of the Italian Republic Giorgio Napolitano and Senate's Speaker Renato Schifani.

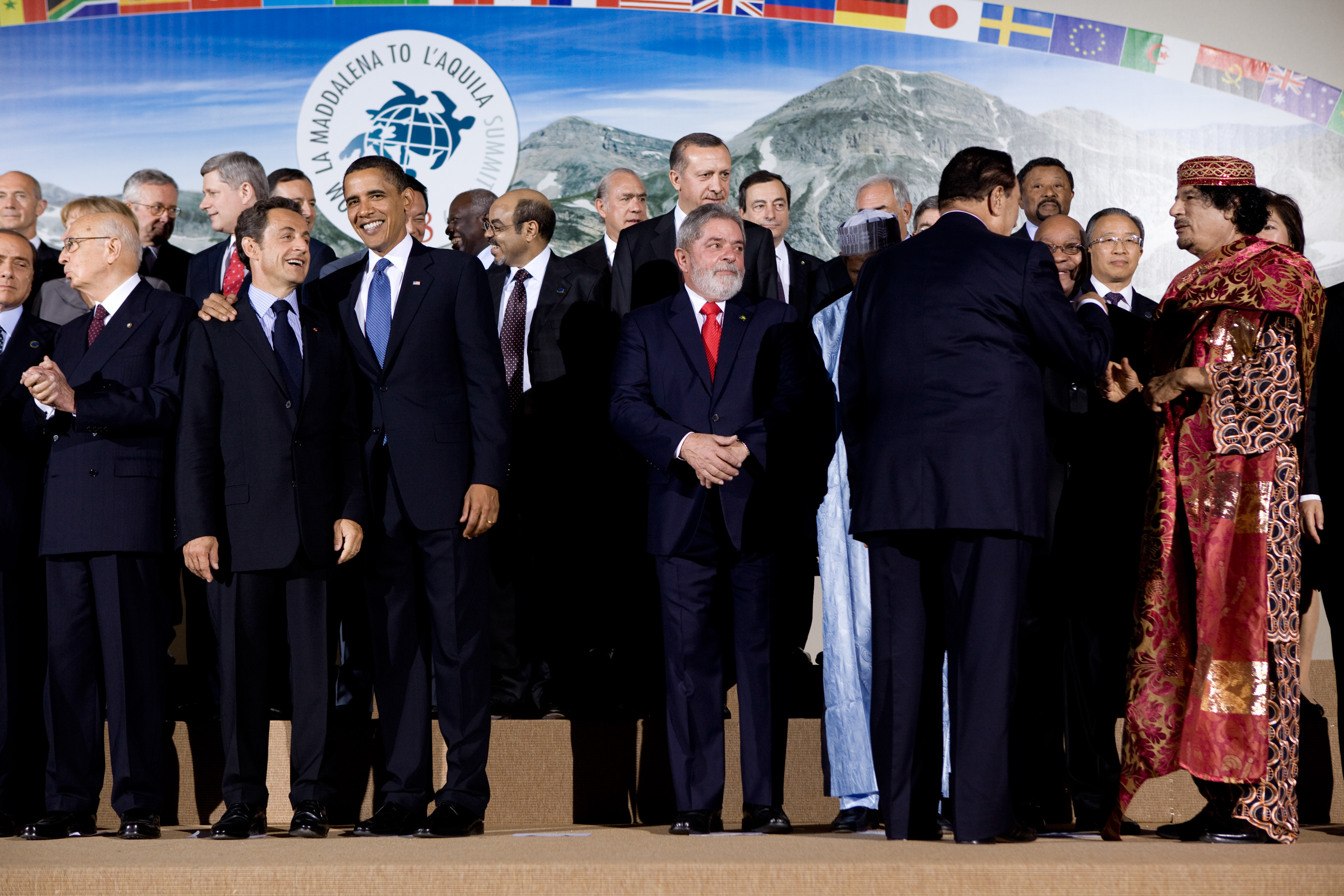
Berlusconi (left) and Gaddafi (right) attending the G-8 Summit in L'Aquila in 2009

When Gaddafi faced a civil war in 2011, Italy imposed a freeze on some Libyan assets linked to him and his family, pursuant to a United Nations-sponsored regime, and then bombed the country to enforce a no-fly zone in Libya. However, Berlusconi spoke out against NATO-led military intervention in Libya.

== Berlusconism ==
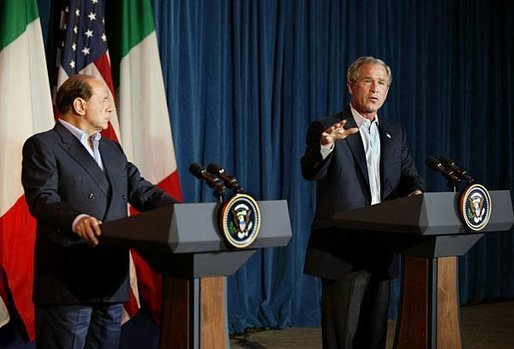
Berlusconi with United States president George W. Bush in Texas, 2005

Berlusconismo ('Berlusconism') is a term used in Italian media and political analysts to describe the political positions of Berlusconi. The term arose in the 1980s, with a strongly positive meaning, as a synonym for entrepreneurial optimism. According to the definition given by the online vocabulary of the Italian Encyclopedia Institute, Berlusconismo has a wide range of meanings, all having their origins in the figure of Berlusconi, and the political movement inspired by him: the "thought movement", but also to "social phenomenon", and the phenomenon "of custom", which is bound to his entrepreneurial and political figure. The term is also used to refer to a certain laissez-faire vision supported by him, not just in the economy and markets, but also in relation to politics.

According to Berlusconi's political and entrepreneurial opponents, Berlusconismo is only a form of demagogy that is comparable to Italian fascism, in part because Berlusconi defended aspects of the regime of Benito Mussolini, although he criticised the Manifesto of Race, the Fascist Racial Laws, and the alliance with Nazi Germany. In 2013, he returned to calling Mussolini a good leader whose biggest mistake was signing up to the Holocaust in Italy and the extermination of the Jews. Contrastingly, his supporters compare Berlusconismo to French Gaullism and Argentinian Peronism.

=== Political positions ===
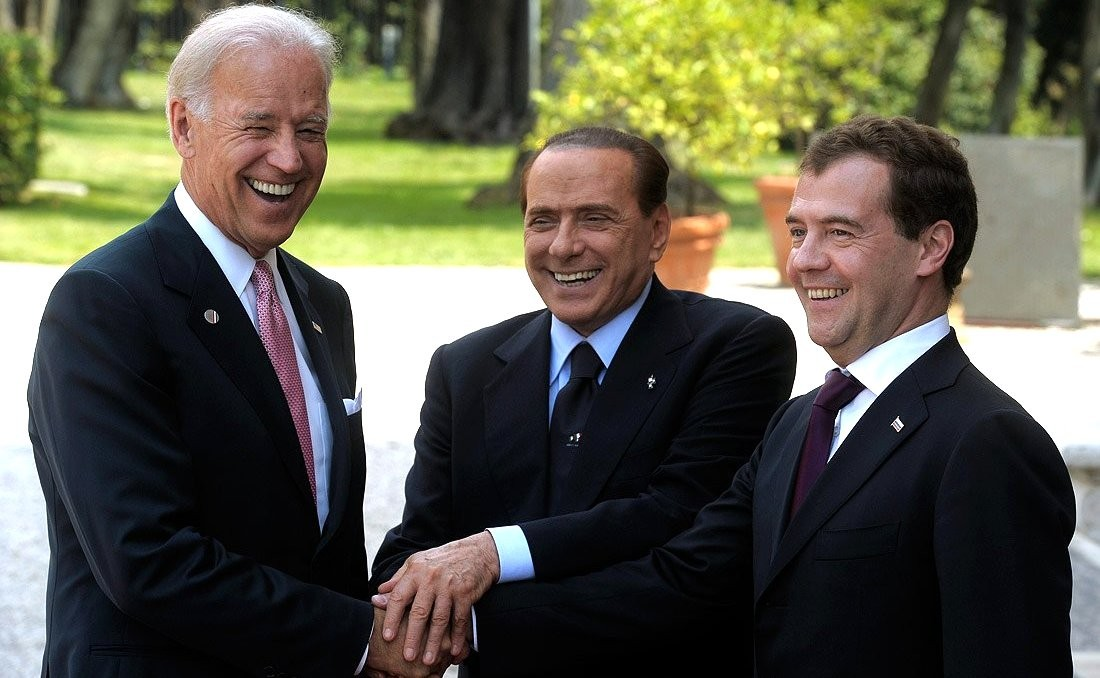
Berlusconi with United States vice-president Joe Biden and Russian president Dmitry Medvedev meeting in Italy, 2011

Berlusconi defined himself as moderate, liberal, and a supporter of free trade; he was often also described as a populist or a conservative. After his resignation in 2011, Berlusconi became increasingly Eurosceptic, and he was often critical of the German chancellor Angela Merkel. One of Berlusconi's main leadership tactics was to use the party as an apparatus to reach power; it was defined as a light party because of a lack of a complex structure. This was decidedly comparable to the political tactics used by Charles De Gaulle in France. Another feature of great importance was the emphasis on a "liberal revolution", summarised by the "Contract with the Italians" of 2001.

Berlusconi's proposed reforms were added to the pillars of his "Contract with the Italians", principally on the form of the Italian Constitution and the state, including the passage from a parliamentary system to a presidential republic, a higher election threshold, the abolition of the Italy's Senate of the Republic, a halving in the number of members of the country's Chamber of Deputies, the abolition of the provinces of Italy, and the reform of the judiciary, with separation of the careers between magistrates and magistrates' liability insurance, which Berlusconi considered partial. Berlusconi declared himself to be persecuted by judges, having undergone 34 trials, accusing them of being manipulated by left-wingers and comparing himself to Enzo Tortora, who was a victim of a miscarriage of justice. In 2013, Berlusconi declared himself favourable to civil unions.

Berlusconi was criticised for having legitimised and institutionalised radical-right parties, such as Brothers of Italy (FdI) and Lega Nord/Lega, and the post-fascists in Italy. He acknowledged this but said that—by legitimising them within the centre-right coalition—they would have become an extremist right that would not have won. For critics, including the historian David Broder, it was not FdI's Giorgia Meloni and Lega's Matteo Salvini, but Berlusconi himself who legitimised them and campaigned for them. Berlusconi's first cabinet in 1994 was the country's first right-wing coalition since World War II, and included neo-fascists for the first time in Europe since 1945; the post-fascists merged with his party in 2009. In his last years, Berlusconi's party and leadership were eclipsed by Salvini's Lega and Meloni's FdI. In November 2026, Jason Horowitz of The New York Times wrote that many are seeing Berlusconi as "creating the mold for President Trump" for having "first brought in 'the fascists,' as he called the far right, to help govern with him", and that his calculus was "purely political" as he needed the votes to form "a winning coalition in 1994 and to gain power, not least to protect his vast business interests from prosecutors".

=== Comparisons to other leaders ===
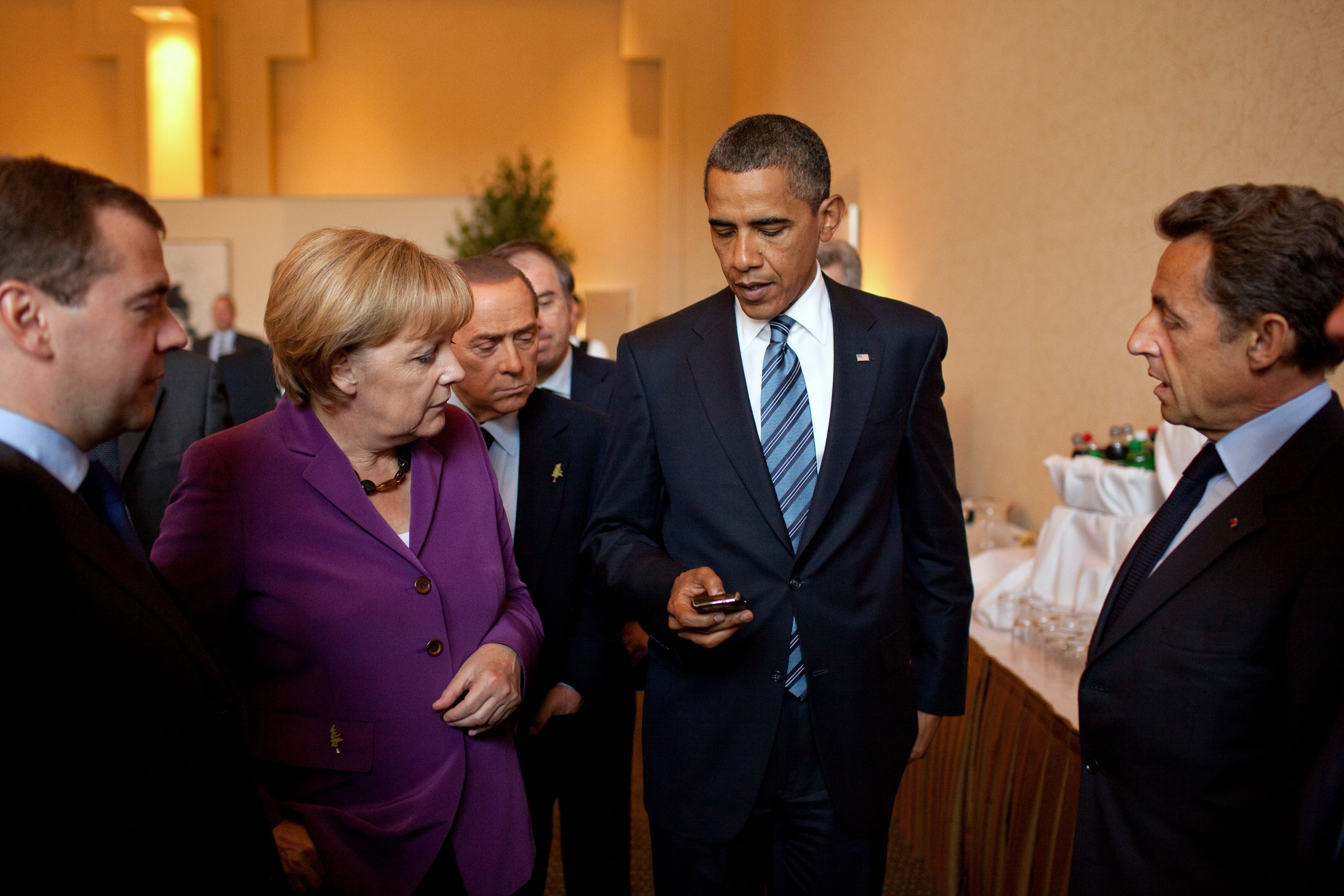
Berlusconi standing between German chancellor Angela Merkel and United States president Barack Obama at the 36th G8 summit in Muskoka, Canada, 2010

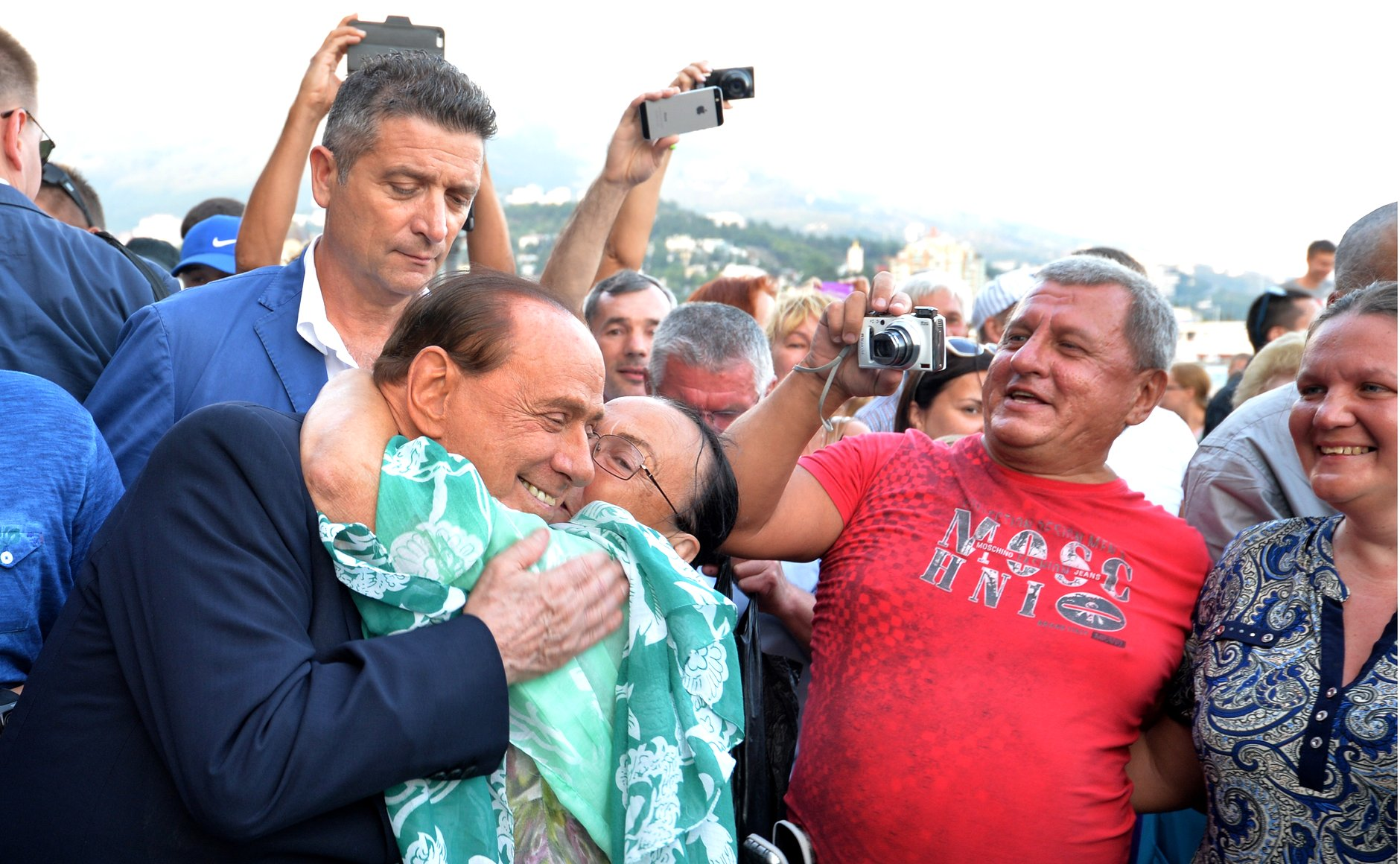
Berlusconi among the crowd during his trip in Crimea, 2015

A number of writers and political commentators considered Berlusconi's political success a precedent for the 2016 United States presidential election of real estate tycoon Donald Trump as the 45th president of the United States, with most citing Berlusconi's panned prime ministerial tenure and therefore making the comparison in dismay. Roger Cohen of The New York Times wrote: "Widely ridiculed, endlessly written about, long unscathed by his evident misogyny and diverse legal travails, Berlusconi proved a Teflon politician ... Nobody who knows Berlusconi and has watched the rise and rise of Donald Trump can fail to be struck by the parallels." In The Daily Beast, Barbie Latza Nadeau wrote: "If Americans are wondering just what a Trump presidency would look like, they only need to look at the traumatized remains of Italy after Berlusconi had his way." During the 2016 United States election, Politico described Berlusconi as the closest parallel to Trump in a historical world leader. In a piece written for Slate and published in April 2017, Lorenzo Newman noted the similarities in the career trajectories between the two.

In 2015, Andrej Babiš, the then Finance Minister of the Czech Republic, was compared to Berlusconi due to his media ownership, business activities, political influence, and legal problems with a prison sentence hanging over him. Foreign Policy drew parallels between the two, labelling Babiš with the nickname "Babisconi". British historian Perry Anderson wrote that, despite Berlusconi's reputation as an enfant terrible of the European right, his actual policy record places him "to the left of Bill Clinton, who built much of his career in America on policies—delivering executions in Arkansas, scything welfare in Washington—that would be unthinkable for any Prime Minister in Italy".

== Legal problems ==
Berlusconi was tried in Italian courts in several cases. The outcome for six of those cases were politically altered to end with "no conviction", because of laws passed by Berlusconi's parliamentary majority shortening the time limit for prosecution of various offences and making false accounting illegal only if there is a specific damaged party reporting the fact to the authorities. Berlusconi claimed that "this is a manifest judicial persecution, against which I am proud to resist, and the fact that my resistance and sacrifice will give the Italians a more fair and efficient judicial system makes me even more proud", and added that "789 prosecutors and magistrates took an interest in the politician Berlusconi from 1994 to 2006 with the aim of subverting the votes of the Italian people" citing statistics that he said have constituted a "calvary including 577 visits by police, 2,500 court hearings and 174 million euros in lawyers' bills paid by me". Berlusconi had always been able to afford top lawyers and publicists, for example Nicolas Sarkozy was one of his French top defenders. Some of his former prosecutors later joined the parliamentary opposition. Some of his attorneys are also members of parliament.

Overview of legal issues for Silvio Berlusconi
Status of trial		Allegation
Convictions		Mediaset trial 2: on a personal tax evasion of €7.3 million committed in 1994–98 through illicit trade of movie rights between secret fictive companies. (First-instance: 4 years jail and 3 years public office ban; Appeal Court: 4 years jail and 5 years public office ban; Supreme Court: 4 years jail and 2 years public office ban; ECHR: appeal rejected, no human rights violations found in the trial)
Acquittals	Acquittal, due to a changed law	All Iberian 2: false accounting. (acquittal, due to the new law on false accounting passed in April 2002 by the Berlusconi II Cabinet which had the effect of decriminalizing the offence of false accounting.); SME-Ariosto 2: false accounting. (acquittal, due to the new law on false accounting passed in April 2002 by the Berlusconi II Cabinet which had the effect of decriminalizing the offence.)
Acquittals	Other acquittals	SME-Ariosto 1: bribes to the judges Renato Squillante (600 million lira) and Filippo Verde (750 million lira), swaying them to rule in favor of Berlusconi in a court case deciding to whom IRI should sell the SME company. (First-instance: guilty of bribing Squillante but acquitted due to statute of limitations; Appeal Court: Acquitted for complicity in the crime; Supreme Court: Acquitted for complicity in the crime.); Bribery of the Guardia di Finanza (Arces process): Payment of 380 million lira in bribes to three officers of the Guardia di Finanza engaged in tax audits, convincing them to "turn the blind eye" against tax frauds committed by 4 Fininvest owned companies: Videotime (1989), Arnoldo Mondadori Editore (1991), Mediolanum (1992) and TELE+ (1994). (First-instance: 2 years 9 months jail; Appeal Court: statute of limitations for the first 3 cases, acquittal for the fourth (not proven); Supreme Court: full acquittal for all 4 cases; In 2010, the Supreme Court noted through its ruling in the Bribery of lawyer David Mills to commit perjury case, that his false testimony had resulted in an incorrect acquittal for the charges against Silvio Berlusconi in the Arces process. But when considering the statute of limitations now apply for all four charges in the case, the judicial system did not find it appropriate to reopen the case); Medusa Film company purchase: false accounting equal to 10bn lira (€5.2 million), which were secretly transferred to Berlusconi's private bank accounts in 1988. (First-instance: 1 year and 4 months imprisonment; Appeal Court: Full acquittal; Supreme Court: Full acquittal, as he was too rich to be aware of such small amounts); Macherio estate land acquisitions 2: embezzlement, tax evasion, false accounting for the company Idra. (Appeal Court: full acquittal for all three charges); Mediatrade investigation (Milan): tax evasion and embezzlement from TV-rights traded by the company Mediatrade in 1999–02; a subcase of Mediaset Trial 1+2. (Preliminary hearing: full acquittal; Supreme Court: full acquittal); Mediatrade investigation (Rome): €10 million tax evasion from TV-rights traded by the company Mediatrade in 2003–4; a subcase of Mediaset Trial 1+2. (Preliminary hearing: Statute of limitations for 2003 offences and full acquittal for 2004 offences; Supreme Court: appeal was rejected as inadmissible); Telecinco TV-channel (Spanish case): Violation of the antitrust law, money laundering, and tax fraud equal to 100bn lira (€52 million). (Spanish Supreme Court: full acquittal)
Discharged		RAI-Fininvest advertising cartel: Berlusconi was through his status as upcoming Prime Minister accused of extortion towards RAI in September 1993, in the attempt of convincing them to sign a cartel agreement on the advertising shares between RAI and the Fininvest TV networks, to get softer competition and higher prices. (Preliminary hearing: The judge ruled the case to be archived due to insufficient amounts of evidence); Drug trafficking: Tax bribery on Pay-TV: Mafia bombings of 1992–1993: Investigations dropped due to lack of evidence. Close associate Marcello Dell'Utri was convicted of collusion with the Mafia, but this was later overturned.; Connection to the Mafia: Defendant together with Marcello Dell'Utri for money laundering.; Saccà case: Bribery and attempted bribery.; State flights: Abuse in the use of flight status.; Defamation by use of TV-medium: Defamation aggravated by the use of the television medium.; Trani investigation: Abuse of office for the President of the pressures on the AGCOM.
Guilty of extinct crimes	Time limits extinct crimes (Note: The statute of limitations vary from case to case, as it is calculated according to the maximum penalty for the criminal code referred to by the indictment. If proceedings gets delayed due to circumstances not being caused by the court system, the limitation period can be extended up till maximum 25%. In addition, the limitation period can also be extended if the judge conclude presence of "specific aggravating circumstances" due to repeated relapse of committing specific crimes. In rare cases, the limitation period can also be reduced due to extenuating circumstances. "If the application of the statute of limitations due to terminate shall be a result of the granting of extenuating circumstances, the judgment is characterized by a prior acknowledgment of guilt of the accused and is a source of injury to him.")	Lodo Mondadori: bribery of judges. (statute of limitation acquittal); All Iberian 1: 23 billion lira (€11.9 million) bribe to Bettino Craxi via an offshore bank account code-named All Iberian. (First-instance: 2 years 4-month jail; Appeal Court: acquitted since the statute of limitations expired before the appeal); Bribery of lawyer David Mills: to make a false testimony in the two processes All Iberian and Bribery of the Guardia di Finanza. (Statute of limitation acquittal); Abuse of office in the Bancopoli/Unipol affair: concerning the illegal publication of wiretapped conversations in a family newspaper in 2005. (First-instance: 1-year jail + €80,000 compensatory damage payment to Piero Fassino; Appeal Court: Acquittal due to statute of limitations, but upheld the compensatory payment.)
Guilty of extinct crimes	Time limits extinct crimes, due to a changed law	Lentini affair: false accounting. (guilty, but acquitted due to a reduced statute of limitations in a new false accounting law passed by the Berlusconi government); Fininvest financial statements in 1988–1992: false accounting and embezzlement. (guilty, but acquitted due to a reduced statute of limitations in a new false accounting law passed by the Berlusconi government); Fininvest consolidated financial statements: false accounting. (guilty, but acquitted due to a reduced statute of limitations in a new false accounting law passed by the Berlusconi government); Mediaset trial 1: on false accounting and embezzlement committed in 1988–94 for the company Fininvest SpA. (indicted in 2005, but in 2007, the charges were declined ahead of the first-instance court trial, due to statute of limitations)
Guilty of extinct crimes	Amnesty extinct crimes	Propaganda Due (P2) Masonic Lodge trial: committed perjury when he testified in a later libel court trial filed against three journalists in 1989, that he had only joined the P2 lodge shortly before it was revealed as illegal without even paying entry fee; which was contradicted by evidence that he had been a paying member for 3 years. (Appeal Court: guilty, but offense was pardoned by an amnesty law passed in 1989); Macherio estate land acquisitions 1: false accounting for the company Buonaparte. (guilty, but amnesty applied following the 1992 fiscal remission law)
Ongoing trials		Bribery of senators supporting the Prodi government: Sergio De Gregorio and other senators bribed in 2006, to topple the Prodi government. (First-instance: court trial began on 11 February 2014); Defamation against Antonio Di Pietro: who was accused during a 2008 election campaign of having obtained his educational degree thanks to the secret services. (In June 2013 the Constitutional Court ruled that the Italian constitution did not grant parliamentarians absolute immunity for spoken words during election campaigns. This ruling allow for Berlusconi's previously halted court case now to be re-opened by the Constitutional Court to judge the merits of the case. The case will however be suspended until the affiliated case against the Italian Chamber of Deputies, where two courts asked for annulment of its 22 September 2010 decree granting Berlusconi absolute parliamentary immunity, has been judged. On 18 July 2014, the Constitutional Court ruled the decree indeed was unconstitutional and annulled it; meaning that the civil court proceedings against Berlusconi now can continue.)

== Controversies ==
Berlusconi was involved in many controversies and over 20 court cases during his political career, including being sentenced to four years' imprisonment and a five-year ban from public office by the Court of Appeals for €7M tax evasion (and €280M slush fund) on 8 May 2013, confirmed by the Court of Cassation on 1 August 2013. Due to a general pardon, his imprisonment was reduced to one year, which due to his age could be served either as a house arrest or as community service. On 24 June 2013, Berlusconi was found guilty of paying an underage prostitute for sex, and of abusing his powers in an ensuing cover up. He was sentenced to seven years in jail, and banned from public office for life. He was acquitted from the sex charges by the Italy appeals court on Friday, 18 July 2014.

=== Economic conflicts of interest ===
According to journalists Marco Travaglio and Enzo Biagi, Berlusconi entered politics to save his companies from bankruptcy and himself from convictions. Berlusconi's supporters hailed him as the "novus homo", an outsider who was going to bring a new efficiency to the public bureaucracy and reform the state from top to bottom. Berlusconi was investigated for forty different inquests in less than two years. Berlusconi's governments passed laws that shortened statutory terms for tax fraud. Romano Prodi, who defeated Berlusconi in 2006, claimed that these were ad personam laws, meant to solve Berlusconi's problems and defend his interests.

=== Media control and conflict of interest ===
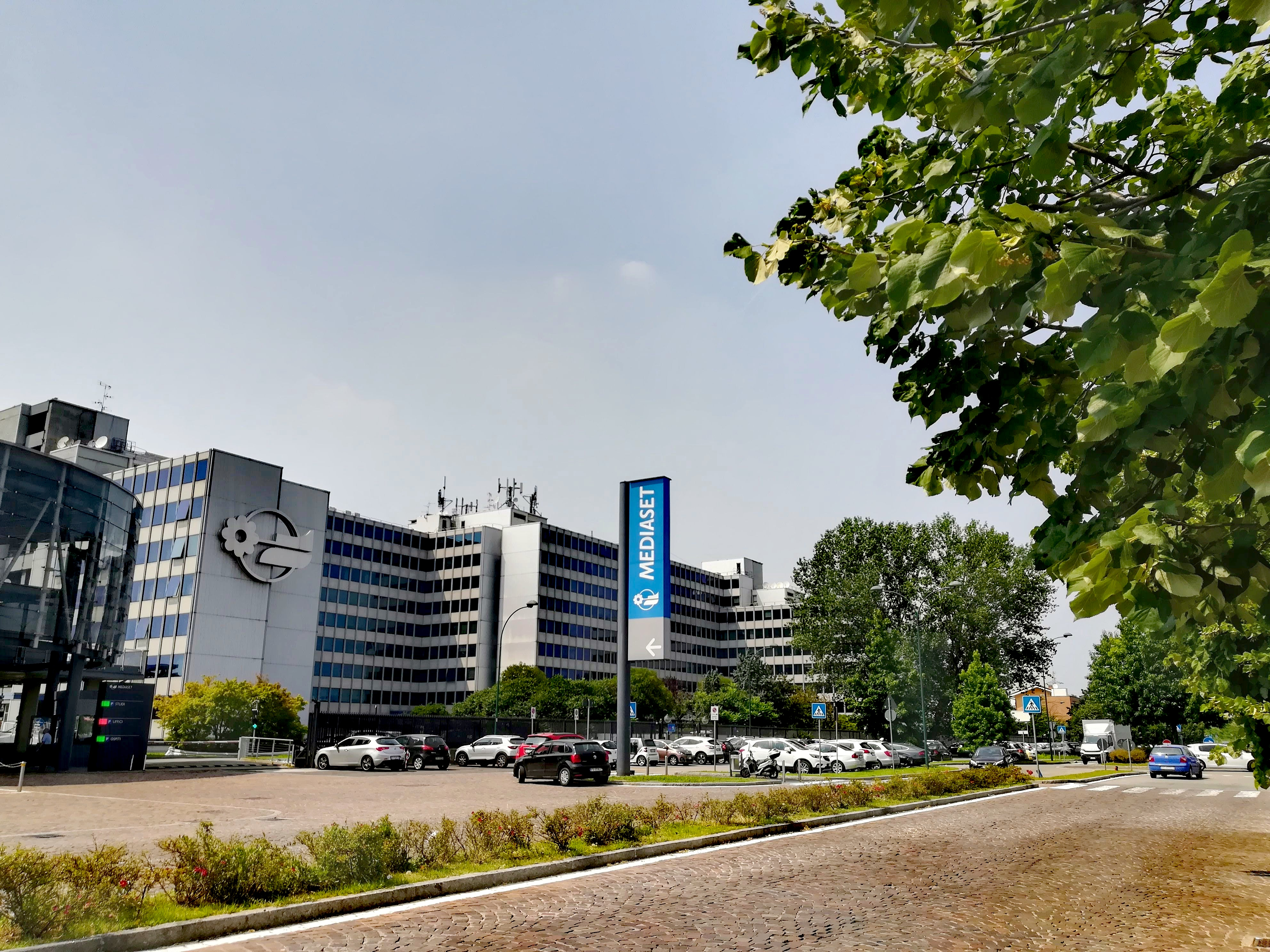
Headquarters of Mediaset, Berlusconi's broadcasting company, in Cologno Monzese

Berlusconi's extensive control over the media was widely criticised by some analysts, some press freedom organisations, and extensively by several Italian newspapers, national and private TV channels, by opposition leaders and in general members of opposition parties, who allege that Italy's media has limited freedom of expression. However such coverage of the complaint in practice put under discussion the point of the complaint itself. The Freedom of the Press 2004 Global Survey, an annual study issued by the American organisation Freedom House, downgraded Italy's ranking from Free to Partly Free, due to Berlusconi's influence over RAI, a ranking which, in "Western Europe" was shared only with Turkey (as of 2005). Reporters Without Borders states that in 2004, "The conflict of interests involving Prime Minister Berlusconi and his vast media empire was still not resolved and continued to threaten news diversity." In April 2004, the International Federation of Journalists joined the criticism, objecting to the passage of a law vetoed by Carlo Azeglio Ciampi in 2003, which critics believe was designed to protect Berlusconi's reported 90% control of the Italian national media.

Berlusconi's influence over RAI became evident when in Sofia, Bulgaria he expressed his views on journalists Enzo Biagi and Michele Santoro, and comedian Daniele Luttazzi. Berlusconi said that they "use television as a criminal means of communication". They lost their jobs as a result. This statement was called by critics "Editto Bulgaro".

The TV broadcasting of a satirical programme called RAIot was censored in November 2003 after the comedian Sabina Guzzanti made outspoken criticism of the Berlusconi media empire. Mediaset, one of Berlusconi's companies, sued RAI over Guzzanti's program, demanding 20 million euros for "damages"; in November 2003 the show was cancelled by the president of RAI, Lucia Annunziata. The details of the event were made into a Michael Moore-style documentary called Viva Zapatero!, which was produced by Guzzanti.

Berlusconi owned via Mediaset 3 of 7 national TV channels: (Canale 5, Italia 1, and Rete 4). Mediaset stated that it uses the same criteria as the public (state-owned) television RAI in assigning a proper visibility to all the most important political parties and movements (the so-called 'Par Condicio')—which has been since often disproved. Enrico Mentana, the news anchor long seen as a guarantor of Canale 5's independence, walked out in April 2008, saying that he no longer felt "at home in a group that seems like an electoral campaign committee".

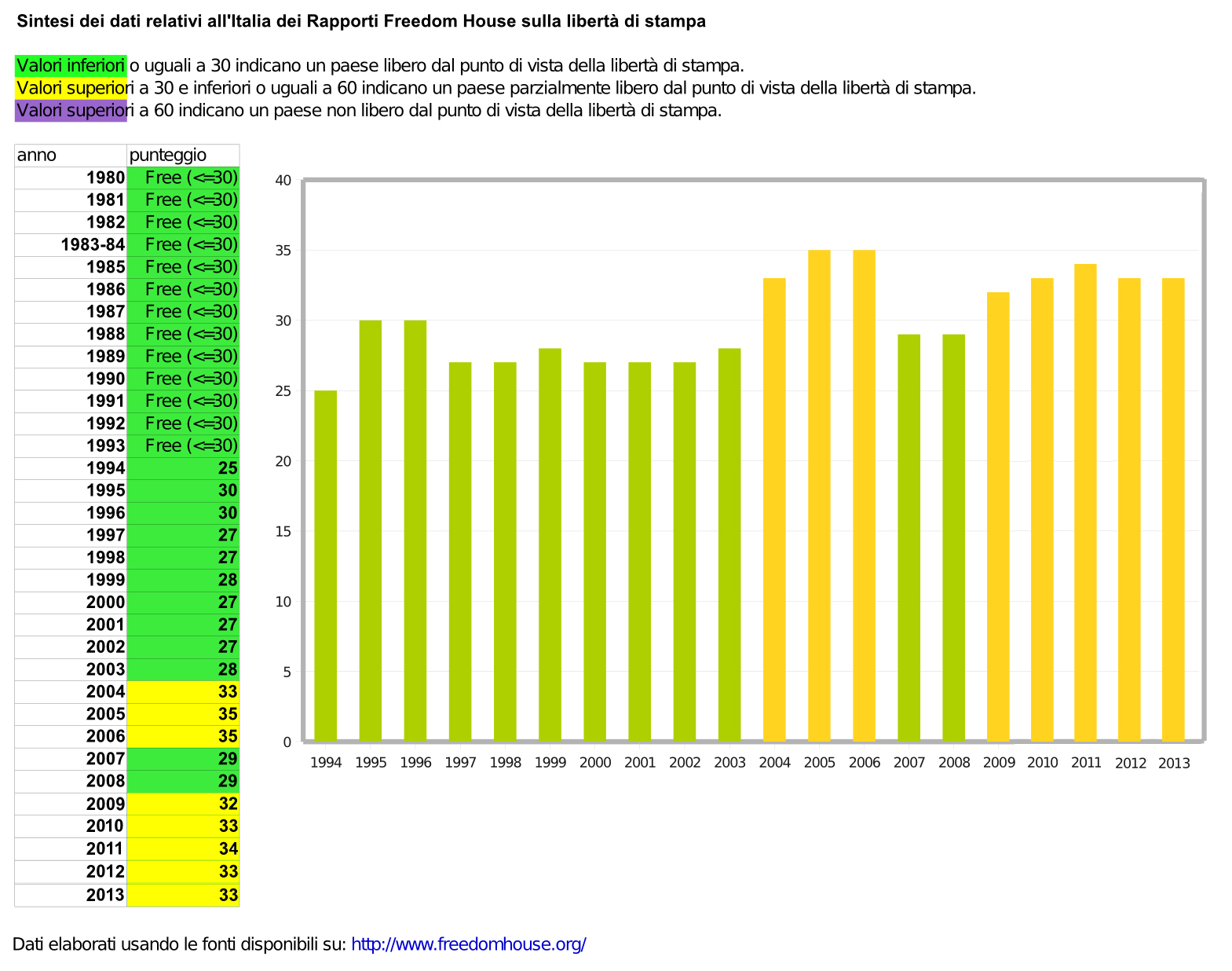
Synthesis of Freedom House annual data related to Italy about the freedom of press reports from 1980 to 2013

On 24 June 2009, Berlusconi during the Confindustria young members congress in Santa Margherita Ligure, Italy invited the advertisers to interrupt or boycott the advertising contracts with the magazines and newspapers published by Gruppo Editoriale L'Espresso, in particular la Repubblica and the newsmagazine L'espresso, calling the publishing group "shameless", claiming that it was fuelling the economic crisis by discussing it extensively and accusing it of making a "subversive attack" against him. The publishing group announced it would begin legal proceedings against Berlusconi, given the "criminal and civil relevance" of his remarks.

In October 2009, Reporters Without Borders secretary-general Jean-François Julliard declared that Berlusconi "is on the verge of being added to our list of Predators of Press Freedom", which would be a first for a European leader. He also added that Italy will probably be ranked last in the European Union in the upcoming edition of the RWB press freedom index.

=== Criticism by The Economist ===
One of Berlusconi's strongest critics in the media outside Italy was the British weekly The Economist (nicknamed "The Ecommunist" by Berlusconi, despite the magazine's association with market liberalism), which in its issue of 26 April 2001 carried a title on its front cover, 'Why Silvio Berlusconi is unfit to lead Italy'. The war of words between Berlusconi and The Economist gained notoriety, with Berlusconi taking the publication to court in Rome and The Economist publishing letters against him. The magazine claimed that the documentation contained in its article proved that Berlusconi was 'unfit' for office because of his numerous conflicts of interest. Via Fininvest, Berlusconi claimed the article contained "a series of old accusations" that was an "insult to truth and intelligence".

According to The Economist's findings, Berlusconi, while prime minister, retained in effective control of 90% of all national television broadcasting. This figure included stations he owned directly as well as those over which he had indirect control by dint of his position as prime minister and his ability to influence the choice of the management bodies of these stations. The Economist also claimed that Berlusconi was corrupt and self-serving. A key journalist for The Economist, David Lane, set out many of these charges in his book Berlusconi's Shadow.

Lane points out that Berlusconi had not defended himself in court against the main charges, but had relied upon political and legal manipulations, most notably by changing the statute of limitation to prevent charges being completed in the first place. To publicly prove the truth of the documented accusations contained in their articles, the magazine publicly challenged Berlusconi to sue The Economist for libel. Berlusconi did so, losing versus The Economist, and being charged for all the trial costs on 5 September 2008, when the Court in Milan issued a judgment rejecting all Berlusconi's claims and sentenced him to compensate for The Economist's legal expenses. In June 2011, The Economist published a strong article referring to Berlusconi as "The man who screwed an entire country".

=== Legislative changes ===
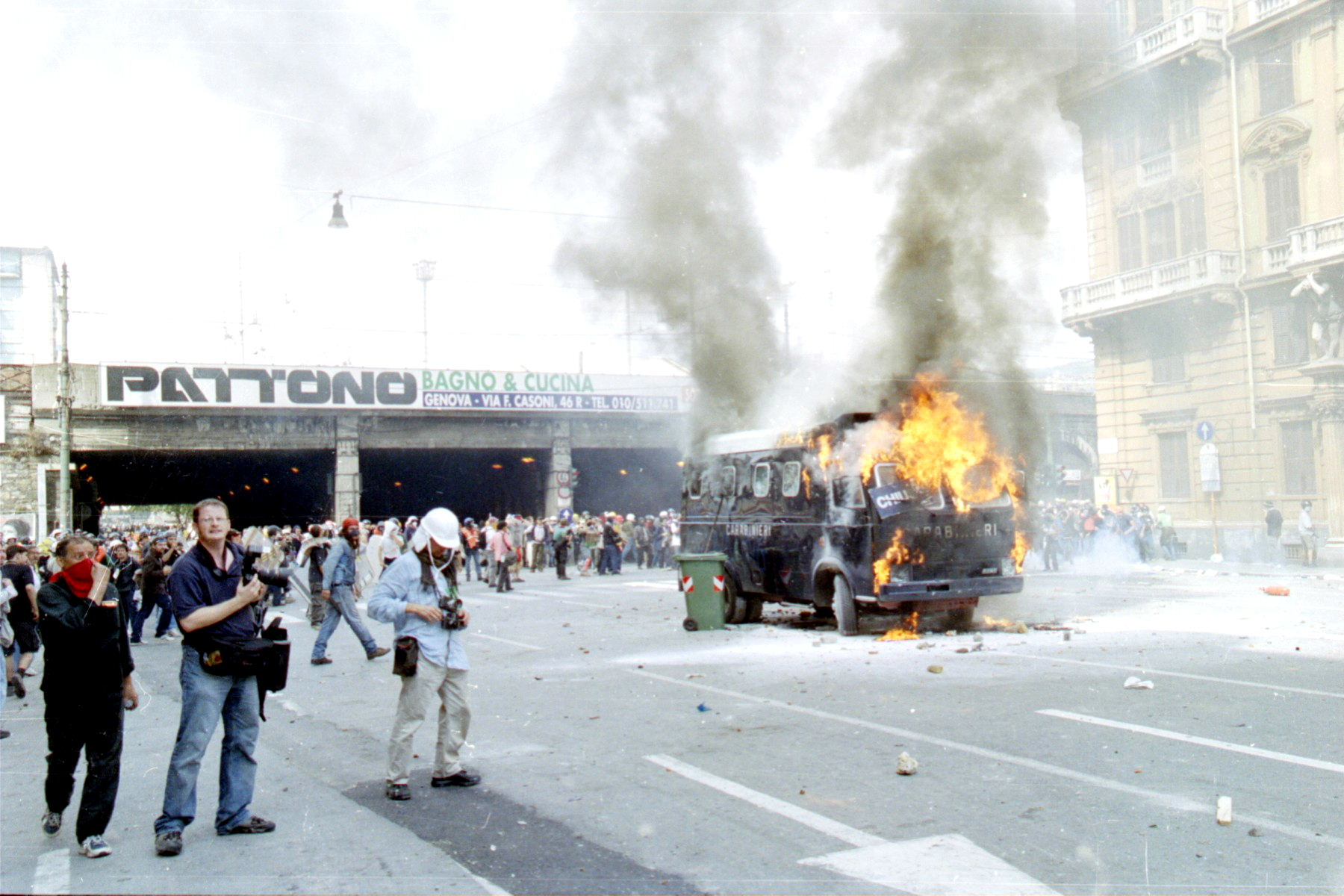
The strong riots during the 27th G8 summit in Genoa, between Italian police and anti-globalization movement, which caused the death of two protesters

On some occasions, laws passed by the Berlusconi administration have effectively delayed ongoing trials involving him. For example, the law reducing punishment for all cases of false accounting and the law on legitimate suspicion, which allowed defendants to request their cases to be moved to another court if they believe that the local judges are biased against them. Because of these legislative actions, political opponents accuse Berlusconi of passing these laws for the purpose of protecting himself from legal charges. La Repubblica, for example, sustained that Berlusconi passed 17 different laws which have advantaged himself. Berlusconi and his allies, on the other hand, maintained that such laws were consistent with everyone's right to a rapid and just trial, and with the principle of "presumption of innocence" (garantismo); furthermore, they claimed that Berlusconi was being subjected to a political "witch hunt", orchestrated by certain (allegedly left-wing) judges.

Berlusconi and his government quarrelled with the Italian judiciary often. His administration attempted to pass a judicial reform intended to limit the flexibility of judges and magistrates in their decision-making. Critics said it would instead limit the magistracy's independence by de facto subjecting the judiciary to the executive's control. The reform was met by almost unanimous dissent from the Italian judges, but was passed by the Italian parliament in December 2004. It was vetoed by the Italian President, Carlo Azeglio Ciampi.

During the night hours between 5 and 6 March 2010, the Berlusconi-led Italian government passed a decree "interpreting" the electoral law to let the PDL candidate run for governor in Lazio after she had failed to properly register for the elections. The Italian Constitution states that electoral procedures can only be changed in Parliament, and must not be changed by governmental decree. Italy's president, whose endorsement of the decree was required by law, said that the measure taken by the government may not violate the Constitution.

=== Accusations of links to the Mafia ===
Berlusconi, to solve his problems, has to solve ours.

— Mafia boss Giuseppe Guttadauro in a wiretapped conversation

Berlusconi was never tried on charges relating to the Sicilian Mafia, although several Mafia turncoats have stated that Berlusconi had connections with the Sicilian criminal association. The claims arise mostly from the hiring of Vittorio Mangano, who was accused of being a mafioso, as a gardener and stable-man at Berlusconi's Villa San Martino in Arcore, a small town near Milan. It was Berlusconi's friend Marcello Dell'Utri who introduced Mangano to Berlusconi in 1973. Berlusconi denied any ties to the Mafia. Marcello Dell'Utri even stated that the Mafia did not exist at all.

In 2004, Dell'Utri, co-founder of Forza Italia, was sentenced to nine years by a Palermo court on charge of "external association to the Mafia", a sentence describing Dell'Utri as a mediator between the economic interests of Berlusconi and members of the criminal organisation. Berlusconi refused to comment on the sentence. In 2010, Palermo's appeals court cut the sentence to seven years, but fully confirmed Dell'Utri's role as a link between Berlusconi and the Mafia until 1992.

In 1996, a Mafia informer, Salvatore Cancemi, declared that Berlusconi and Dell'Utri were in direct contact with Salvatore Riina, head of the Sicilian Mafia in the 1980s and 1990s. Cancemi disclosed that Fininvest, through Marcello Dell'Utri and mafioso Vittorio Mangano, had paid Cosa Nostra 200 million lire (between 100,000 and 200,000 of today's euro) annually. The alleged contacts, according to Cancemi, were to lead to legislation favourable to Cosa Nostra, in particular reforming the harsh 41-bis prison regime. The underlying premise was that Cosa Nostra would support Berlusconi's Forza Italia party in return for political favours. After a two-year investigation, magistrates closed the inquiry without charges. They did not find evidence to corroborate Cancemi's allegations. Similarly, a two-year investigation, also launched on evidence from Cancemi, into Berlusconi's alleged association with the Mafia was closed in 1996.

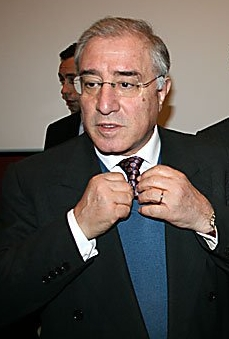
Marcello Dell'Utri

According to yet another Mafia turncoat, Antonino Giuffrè—arrested on 16 April 2002—the Mafia turned to Berlusconi's Forza Italia party to look after the Mafia's interests, after the decline in the early 1990s of the ruling "Christian Democracy" party, whose leaders in Sicily looked after the Mafia's interests in Rome. Dell'Utri was the go-between on a range of legislative efforts to ease pressure on mafiosi in exchange for electoral support, according to Giuffrè. "Dell'Utri was very close to Cosa Nostra and a very good contact point for Berlusconi", he said. Giuffrè also said that Berlusconi himself used to be in touch with Stefano Bontade, a top Mafia boss, in the mid-1970s. Berlusconi's lawyer dismissed Giuffrè's testimony as "false" and an attempt to discredit Berlusconi and his party. Giuffrè said that other Mafia representatives who were in contact with Berlusconi included the Palermo Mafia bosses Filippo Graviano and Giuseppe Graviano. Dell'Utri's lawyer, Enrico Trantino, dismissed Giuffrè's allegations as an "anthology of hearsay".

In October 2009, Gaspare Spatuzza, a Mafioso turncoat, confirmed Giuffrè's statements. Spatuzza testified that his boss Giuseppe Graviano had told him in 1994, that Berlusconi was bargaining with the Mafia, concerning a political-electoral agreement between Cosa Nostra and Berlusconi's Forza Italia. Dell'Utri was the intermediary, according to Spatuzza. Dell'Utri has dismissed Spatuzza's allegations as "nonsense". Berlusconi's lawyer and MP for the PdL, Niccolò Ghedini said that "the statements given by Spatuzza about prime minister Berlusconi are baseless and can be in no way verified".

In 2014, the Supreme Court of Cassation confirmed Dell'Utri's role as a mediator between Berlusconi and Cosa Nostra, who provided him (Berlusconi) protection in exchange for money, and that "the deaths of Stefano Bontade and Girolamo Teresi and the rise of Totò Riina and the "Corleonesi" had not changed the balance that had guaranteed the 1974 agreement", which lasted until 1992. The court described the agreement, concluded "on an equal basis", as being of "mutual interest".

In 2026, while testifying in a trial against Salvatore Baiardo, Giovanni Brusca stated that, in 1994, following the Mafia bombings of 1992 and 1993, "in discussions with Bagarella, we spoke of using them as a political tool, as if they had been instigated by the Left" to facilitate Berlusconi's entry into politics. He declared that Vittorio Mangano had been contacted to reach Berlusconi, and that he subsequently "let us know that he had made contact, that he had informed Berlusconi either through Dell'Utri or other channels, and reported back that Berlusconi had expressed his thanks and promised to help us as soon as possible." However, a "veiled threat" was also sent: "if he didn't help us, we would have planted more bombs to put him in a difficult political position."

=== Remarks on Western civilisation and Islam ===
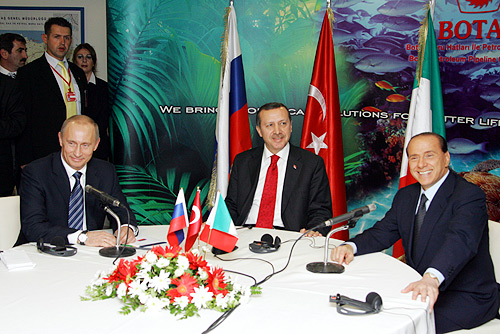
Berlusconi with Russian president Vladimir Putin and Turkish prime minister Recep Tayyip Erdoğan in 2005

After the 11 September 2001 attacks in New York City, Berlusconi said: "We must be aware of the superiority of our civilisation, a system that has guaranteed well-being, respect for human rights and—in contrast with Islamic countries—respect for religious and political rights, a system that has as its value understanding of diversity and tolerance." This declaration caused an uproar, not only in the Arab and Muslim world, but also all around Europe, including Italy. Subsequently, Berlusconi told the press: "We are aware of the crucial role of moderate Arab countries... I am sorry that words that have been misunderstood have offended the sensitivity of my Arab and Muslim friends."

=== Right-to-die case ===
After the family of Eluana Englaro (who had been comatose for 17 years) succeeded in having her right to die recognised by the judges and getting doctors to start the process of allowing her to die in the way established by the court, Berlusconi issued a decree to stop the doctor from letting her die. Stating that "This is murder. I would be failing to rescue her. I'm not a Pontius Pilate", Berlusconi went on to defend his decision by claiming that she was "in the condition to have babies", arguing that comatose women were still subject to menstruation.

=== Anti-immigration laws ===
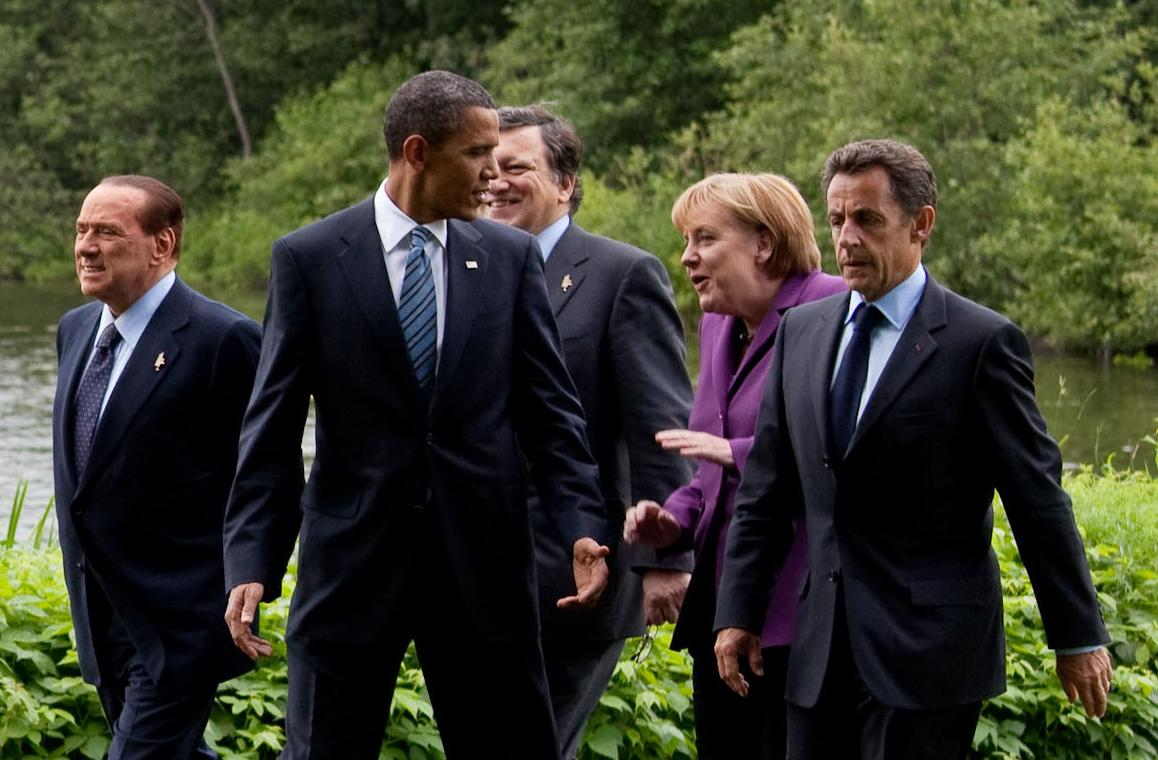
Berlusconi with other G8 leaders in Canada, 2010

During his long career as Prime Minister, Berlusconi had to deal with massive immigration from the coast of North Africa. To limit illegal immigration, the Berlusconi's government promulgated the Bossi-Fini law in 2002. The law provides the expulsion, issued by the Prefect of the Province where an illegal foreign immigrant is found, and is immediately performed with the assistance at the border of the police. The standard allows the repatriation to the country of origin on the high seas, on the basis of bilateral agreements between Italy and neighbouring countries. If the illegal immigrant ships dock on Italian soil, the identification of those entitled to political asylum and the supply of medical treatment and care is undertaken by the marine police force. The law had been criticised by the centre-left opposition. as well as the European Parliament.

=== Jokes, gestures, and blunders ===
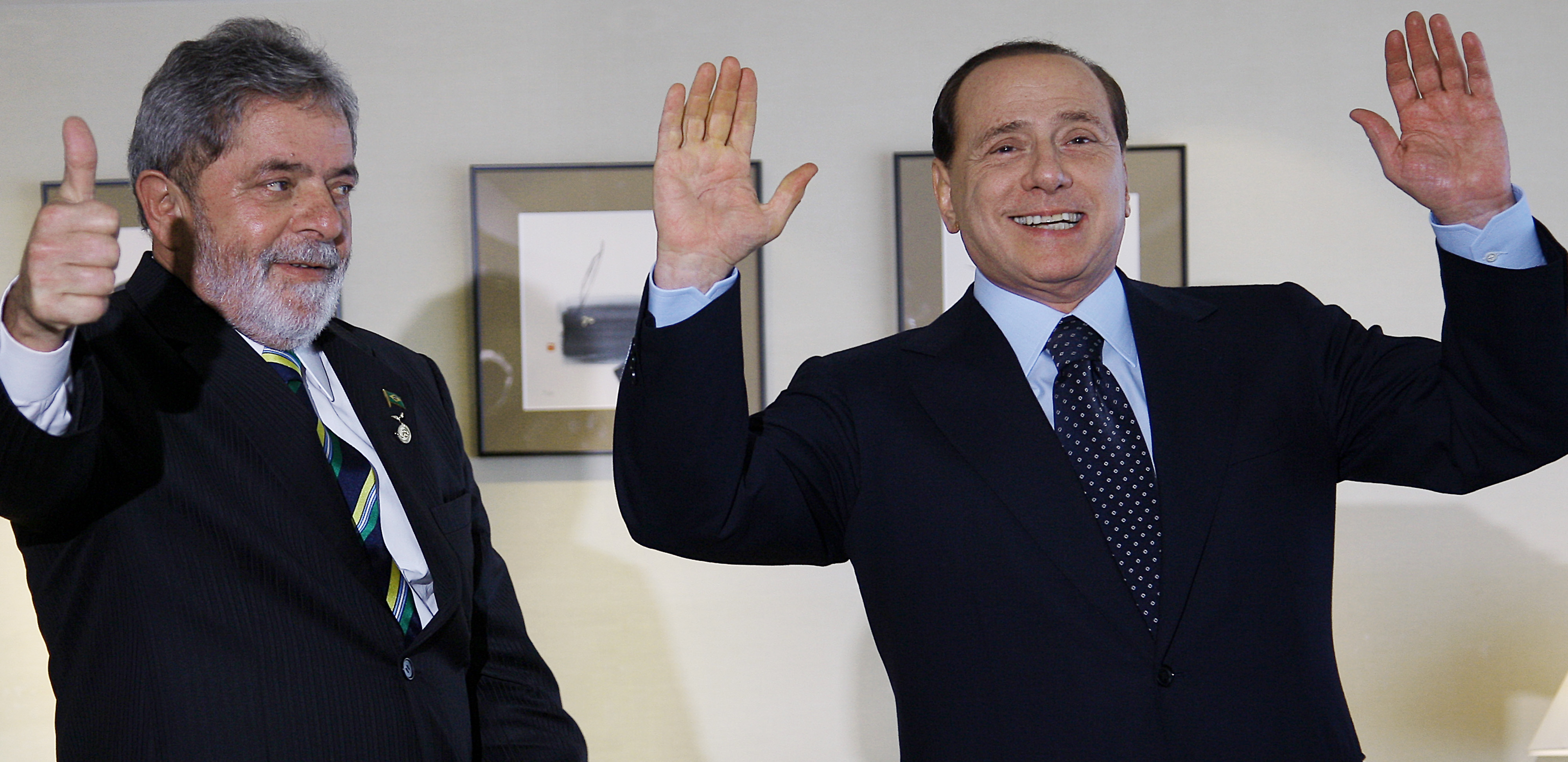
Berlusconi with Brazilian president Luiz Inácio Lula da Silva in 2008

Berlusconi developed a reputation for making insensitive remarks. On 2 July 2003, Berlusconi suggested that German Social democratic MEP Martin Schulz, who had criticised his domestic policies, should play a Nazi concentration camp guard in a film. Berlusconi insisted that he was joking, but accused Schulz and others of being "bad-willing tourists of democracy". This incident caused a brief cooling of Italy's relationship with Germany.

Addressing traders at the New York Stock Exchange in September 2003, Berlusconi listed a series of reasons to invest in Italy, the first of which was that "we have the most beautiful secretaries in the world". This remark resulted in remonstration among female members of parliament, who took part in a one-day cross-party protest.

In 2003, during an interview with Nicholas Farrell, then editor of The Spectator, Berlusconi claimed that Mussolini "had been a benign dictator who did not murder opponents but sent them 'on holiday'". In 2013, he returned to calling Mussolini a good leader whose biggest mistake was signing up to exterminate the Jews.

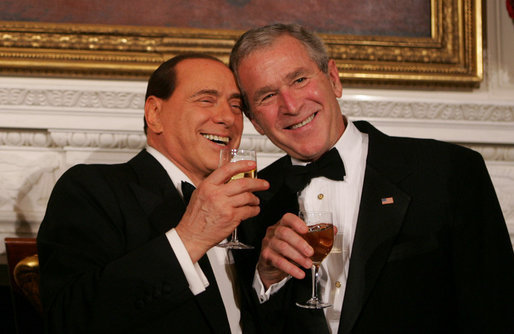
Berlusconi with George W. Bush in 2008

Berlusconi had made disparaging remarks about Finnish cuisine during negotiations to decide on the location of the European Food Safety Authority in 2001. He caused further offence in 2005 when he claimed that during the negotiations he had had to "dust off his playboy charms" to persuade the Finnish president, Tarja Halonen, to concede that the EFSA should be based in Parma instead of Finland, and compared Finnish smoked reindeer unfavourably to culatello. One of Berlusconi's ministers later attempted to explain the comment by saying that "anyone who had seen a picture of Halonen must have been aware that he had been joking". Halonen took the incident in good humour, retorting that Berlusconi had "overestimated his persuasion skills". In March 2006, Berlusconi alleged that Chinese communists under Mao Zedong had "boiled [children] to fertilise the fields". His opponent Romano Prodi criticised Berlusconi for offending the Chinese people and called his comments "unthinkable".

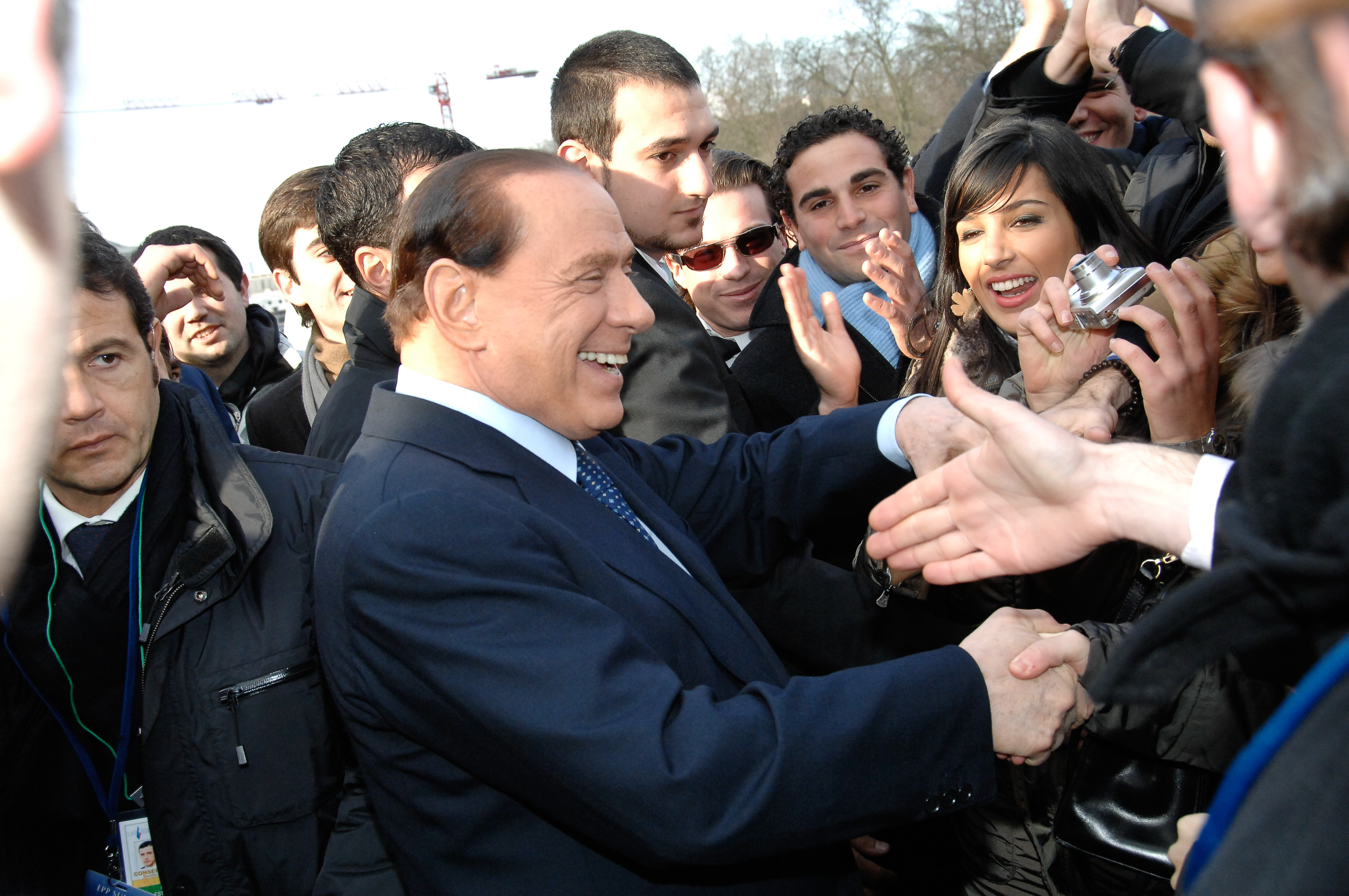
Berlusconi salutes the crowd on the EPP summit in 2009.

In the run-up to the 2008 Italian general election, Berlusconi was accused of sexism for saying that female politicians from the right were "more beautiful" and that "the left has no taste, even when it comes to women". In 2008 Berlusconi criticised the composition of the Council of Ministers of the Spanish Government as being too 'pink' by virtue of the fact that it had (once the President of the Council, José Luis Rodríguez Zapatero, is counted) an equal number of men and women. He also stated that he doubted that such a composition would be possible in Italy given the "prevalence of men" in Italian politics.

Also in 2008, Berlusconi caused controversy at a joint press conference with Russian president Vladimir Putin. When a journalist from the Russian paper Nezavisimaya Gazeta asked a question about Putin's personal relationships, Berlusconi made a gesture towards the journalist imitating a gunman shooting. On 6 November 2008, two days after Barack Obama was elected the first black US president, Berlusconi referred to Obama as "young, handsome and even tanned": On 26 March 2009 he said, "I'm paler [than Mr Obama], because it's been so long since I went sunbathing. He's more handsome, younger and taller."

On 24 January 2009, Berlusconi announced his aim to increase the number of military patrolling the Italian cities from 3,000 to 30,000 to crack down on what he called an "evil army" of criminals. Responding to a female journalist who asked him if this tenfold increase in patrolling soldiers would be enough to secure Italian women from being raped, he said, "We could not field a big enough force to avoid this risk [of rape]. We would need as many soldiers as beautiful women and I don't think that would be possible, because our women are so beautiful." Opposition leaders called the remarks insensitive and in bad taste. Berlusconi retorted that he had merely wanted to compliment Italian women. Other critics accused him of creating a police state.

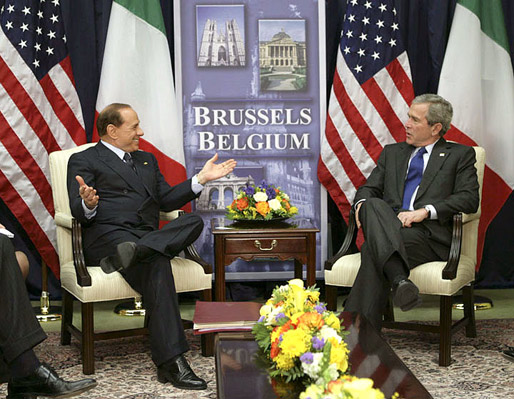
Berlusconi smiles with US president George W. Bush at the NATO headquarters in Brussels, 2005.

Two days after the 2009 L'Aquila earthquake, Berlusconi suggested that people left homeless should view their experience as a camping weekend. In October 2010, Berlusconi was chastised by the Vatican newspaper L'Osservatore Romano after he was filmed telling "offensive and deplorable jokes", including one whose punchline was similar to one of the gravest blasphemies in the Italian language. It was also revealed he had made another antisemitic joke a few days previously. Berlusconi responded to the allegations by saying the jokes were "neither an offence nor a sin, but merely a laugh".

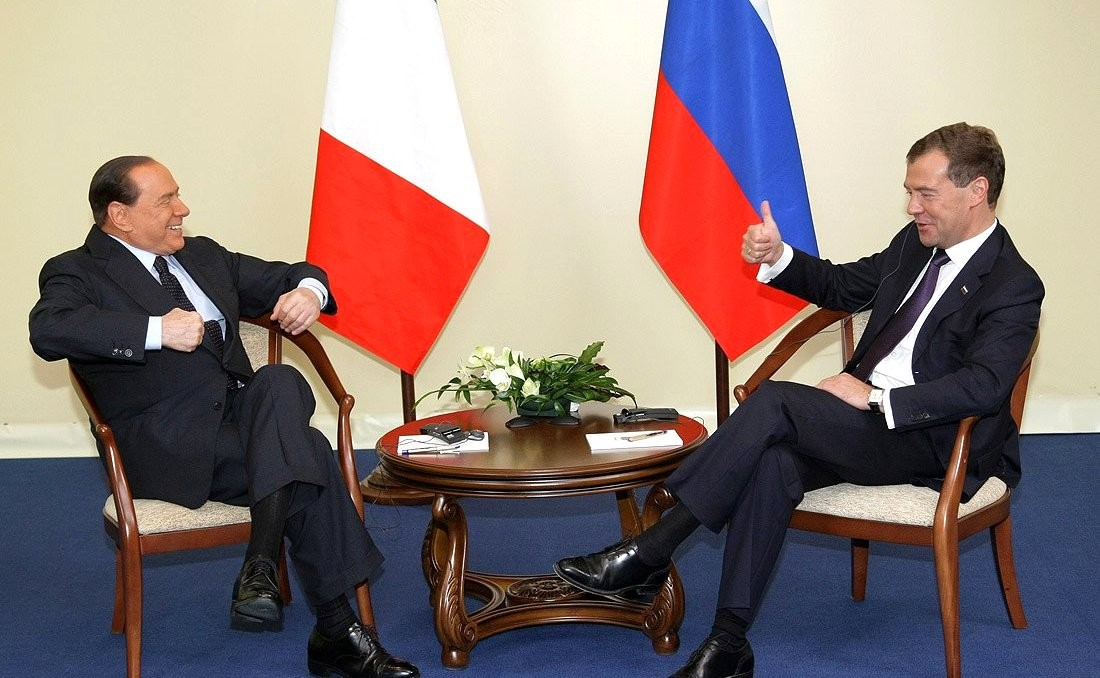
Berlusconi jokes with Russian president Dmitry Medvedev in 2010.

On 1 November 2010, after once again being accused of involvement in juvenile prostitution, he suggested that an audience at the Milan trade fair should stop reading newspapers: "Don't read newspapers any more because they deceive you. ... I am a man who works hard all day long and if sometimes I look at some good-looking girl, it's better to be fond of pretty girls than to be gay." The remarks were immediately condemned by Arcigay, Italy's main gay rights organisation.

On 13 July 2011, according to a leaked telephone surveillance transcript, Berlusconi told his presumed blackmailer Valter Lavitola: "The only thing they can say about me is that I screw around ... Now they're spying on me, controlling my phone calls. I don't give a fuck. In a few months ... I'll be leaving this shit country that makes me sick."

On 27 January 2013, on the occasion of the Holocaust Remembrance Day, Berlusconi said the Italian fascist dictator Benito Mussolini, except for passing anti-Jewish laws in 1938, only had done "good things" for Italy; and also said Mussolini from a strategic point of view did the right thing in siding with Adolf Hitler during World War II, because Hitler at the point of time when the alliance was made had appeared to be winning the war.

=== Friendship with Bettino Craxi ===
Berlusconi's career as an entrepreneur was also often questioned by his detractors. The allegations made against him generally included suspicions about the extremely rapid increase of his activity in the construction industry in the years 1961–63, hinting at the possibility that in those years he received money from unknown and possibly illegal sources. These accusations were regarded by Berlusconi and his supporters as empty slander, trying to undermine Berlusconi's reputation as a self-made man. Also frequently cited by opponents are events dating to the 1980s, including supposed "exchanges of favours" between Berlusconi and Bettino Craxi, the former Socialist prime minister and leader of the Italian Socialist Party convicted in 1994, for various corruption charges. The Milan magistrates who indicted and successfully convicted Craxi in their "Clean Hands" investigation laid bare an entrenched system in which businessmen paid hundreds of millions of dollars to political parties or individual politicians in exchange for sweetheart deals with Italian state companies and the government itself. Berlusconi acknowledged a personal friendship with Craxi.

=== Freedom Army ===
On 28 May 2013, Berlusconi and his entourage launched an online initiative which consisted of the recruitment of volunteers, who are available to defend Berlusconi from the convictions of Milan's prosecutors, who were dealing with his trials, and whom Berlusconi often accused of being communists and anti-democratic. Simone Furlan, the creator of the Freedom Army, said in an interview: "There comes a time in life, when you realize that fighting for an ideal is no longer a choice but an obligation. We civil society we were helpless spectators of the 'War of the Twenty Years' which saw Berlusconi fight and defend against slanderous accusations of all kinds, the result of a judicial persecution without precedent in history." This initiative, launched as Freedom Army, has been immediately nicknamed "Silvio's Army" by the media, and was condemned by the Democratic Party, the Five Star Movement and Left Ecology Freedom.

=== Wiretaps and accusations of corruption ===
In December 2007, the audio recording of a phone call between Berlusconi, then leader of the opposition, and Agostino Saccà (general director of RAI) was published by the magazine L'Espresso and caused a scandal in the media. The wiretap was part of an investigation by the Public Prosecutor Office of Naples, where Berlusconi was investigated for corruption. In the phone call, Saccà expresses words of impassioned political support to Berlusconi and criticises the behaviour of Berlusconi's allies. Berlusconi urges Saccà to broadcast a telefilm series which was strongly advocated by his ally Umberto Bossi. Saccà laments that many people have spread rumours about this agreement causing problems for him. Then Berlusconi asks Saccà to find a job in RAI for a young woman explicitly telling him that this woman would serve as an asset in a secret exchange with a senator of the majority who would help him to cause Prodi, with his administration, to fall. After the publication of these wiretaps, Berlusconi was accused by other politicians and by some journalists of political corruption through the exploitation of prostitution. In his own defence, Berlusconi said: "In the entertainment world everybody knows that, in certain situations in RAI TV you work only if you prostitute yourself or if you are leftist. I have intervened on behalf of some personalities who are not leftists and have been completely set apart by RAI TV." In the State Department's 2011 Trafficking in Persons report authorised by US Secretary of State Hillary Clinton, Berlusconi was explicitly named as a person involved in the "commercial sexual exploitation of a Moroccan child".

=== Divorce and allegations of sexual misconduct ===
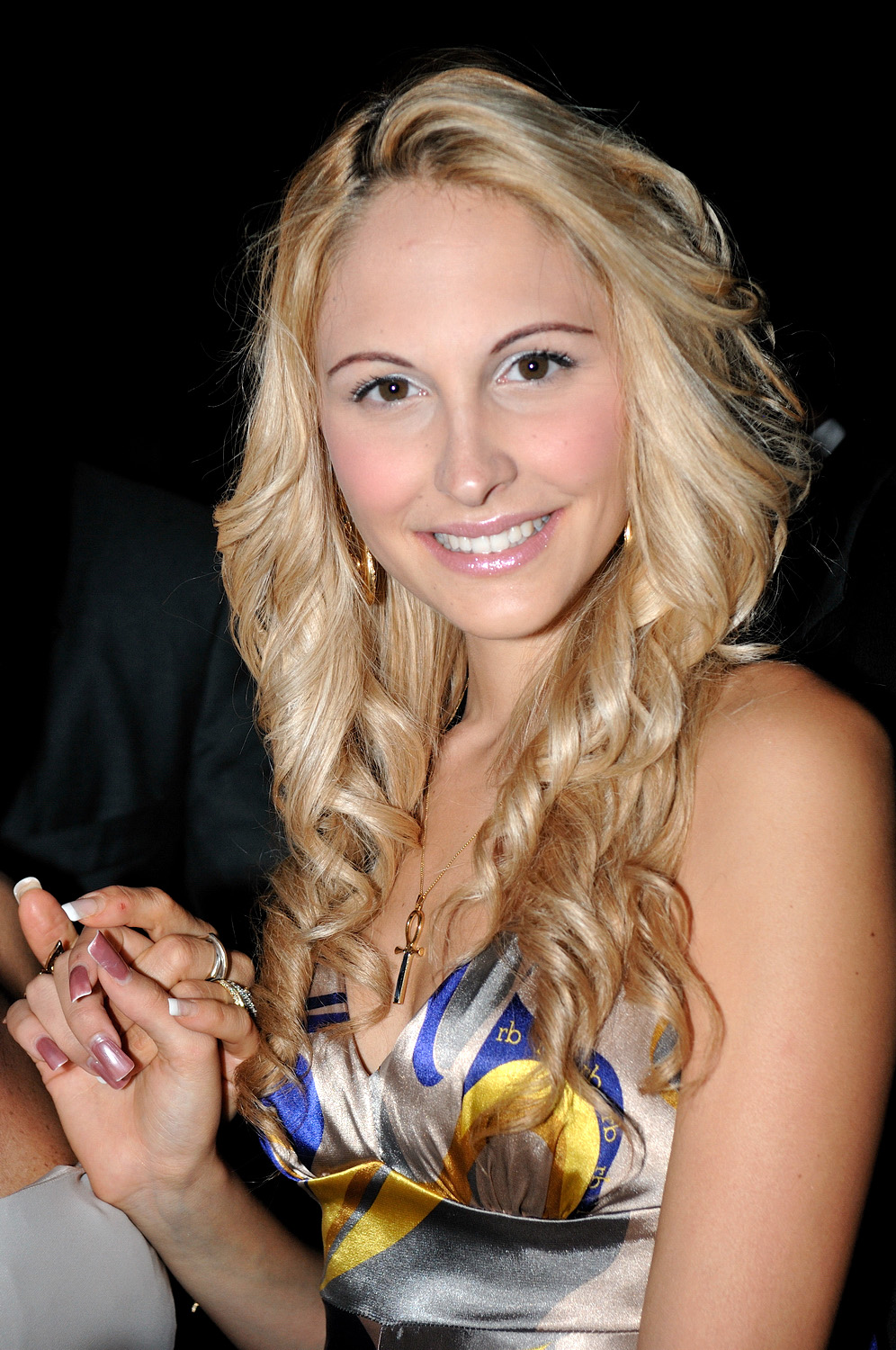
Noemi Letizia at the 2009 Venice Film Festival

At the end of April 2009, Berlusconi's wife Veronica Lario, who would divorce him several years later, wrote an open letter expressing her anger at Berlusconi's choice of young, attractive female candidates—some with little or no political experience—to represent the party in the 2009 European Parliament elections. Berlusconi demanded a public apology, claiming that for the third time, his wife had "done this to me in the middle of an election campaign", and stated that there was little prospect of his marriage continuing. On 3 May, Lario announced she was filing for divorce. She claimed that Berlusconi had not attended his own sons' 18th birthday parties, and that she "cannot remain with a man who consorts with minors" and "is not well".

Noemi Letizia, the girl in question, gave interviews to the Italian press, revealing that she calls Berlusconi papi ('daddy'), that they often spent time together in the past, and that Berlusconi would take care of her career as showgirl or politician, whichever she opted to pursue. Berlusconi claimed that he knew Letizia only through her father and that he never met her alone without her parents. On 14 May, la Repubblica published an article alleging many inconsistencies in Berlusconi's story and asked him to answer ten questions to clarify the situation.

Ten days later, Letizia's ex-boyfriend, Luigi Flaminio, claimed that Berlusconi had contacted Letizia personally in October 2008 and said she had spent a week without her parents at Berlusconi's Sardinian villa around New Year's Eve 2009, a fact confirmed later by her mother. On 28 May 2009, Berlusconi said that he had never had "spicy" relations with Letizia, and said that if any such thing had occurred, he would have resigned immediately.

On 17 June 2009, Patrizia D'Addario, a 42-year-old escort and retired actress from Bari, Italy, claimed that she had been recruited twice to spend the evening with Berlusconi. Berlusconi denied any knowledge of D'Addario being a paid escort: "I have never paid a woman... I have never understood what satisfaction there is if the pleasure of conquest is absent." He also accused an unspecified person of manoeuvring and bribing D'Addario. On 26 June 2009, the "ten questions" to Berlusconi were reformulated by la Repubblica, and subsequently republished multiple times. On 28 August 2009, Berlusconi sued Gruppo Editoriale L'Espresso, the owner company of the newspaper, and classified the ten questions as "defamatory" and "rhetorical".

Berlusconi's lifestyle raised eyebrows in Catholic circles, with vigorous criticism being expressed in particular by Avvenire, owned by the Episcopal Conference of Italy. This was followed by the publication in the newspaper il Giornale (owned by the Berlusconi family) of details with regard to legal proceedings against the editor of Avvenire, Dino Boffo, which seemed to implicate him for a harassment case against the wife of his ex-partner. Dino Boffo has always declared the details of the proceedings to be false, although he has not denied the basic premise.

After a period of tense exchanges and polemics, Boffo resigned from his editorial position on 3 September 2009, and the assistant editor Marco Tarquinio became editor ad interim. During a contested episode of AnnoZero on 1 October 2009, the journalist and presenter Michele Santoro interviewed Patrizia D'Addario. She stated she was contacted by Giampaolo Tarantini—a businessman from Bari—who already knew her and requested her presence at Palazzo Grazioli with "the President". D'Addario also stated that Berlusconi knew that she was a paid escort.

==== Shots of Porto Rotondo ====
The attention of the newspapers was later attracted by photos that the photographer Antonello Zappadu had taken on several occasions; some document a vacation in May 2008 at Villa Certosa, Berlusconi's summer residence in Porto Rotondo, where Czech prime minister Mirek Topolánek appears naked, and during the party young girls in bikinis or topless. On 5 June 2009, El País published 5 of the 700 photos of the party. On recommendations from Berlusconi, the Rome Prosecutor's Office seized the photographic material for violation of privacy.

=== Rubygate ===
In November 2010, 17-year-old Moroccan belly dancer and alleged prostitute Karima El Mahroug, better known as Ruby Rubacuori, claimed to have been given $10,000 by Berlusconi at parties at his private villas. The girl told prosecutors in Milan that these events were like orgies where Berlusconi and 20 young women performed an African-style ritual known as the "bunga bunga" in the nude. It was also found out that on 27 May 2010 El Mahroug had been arrested for theft by the Milan police but (being still a minor) she was directed to a shelter for juvenile offenders. After a couple of hours, while she was being questioned, Berlusconi, who was at the time in Paris, called the head of the police in Milan and pressured for her release, claiming the girl was related to Hosni Mubarak, then President of Egypt, and that to avoid a diplomatic crisis, she was to be brought to the custody of Nicole Minetti. Following repeated telephone calls by Berlusconi to the police authorities, El Mahroug was eventually released and entrusted to Minetti's care. The investigation of Berlusconi for extortion (concussione) and child prostitution regarding Karima El Mahroug has been referred to as "Rubygate".

MP Gaetano Pecorella proposed to lower the age of majority in Italy to solve the case. Minetti was known for previous associations with Berlusconi, having danced for Colorado Cafe, a show on one of Berlusconi's TV channels, and on Scorie, an Italian version of Candid Camera. In November 2009 she became a dental hygienist, and shortly afterward treated Berlusconi for two broken teeth and facial injuries after he was attacked with a marble statue at a political rally. In February 2010, she was selected as one of the candidates representing Berlusconi's The People of Freedom party, despite her lack of any political experience, and was seated on the Regional Council of Lombardy the following month.

The Guardian reported that according to a series of media reports in October 2010, Berlusconi had met El Mahroug, then 17, through Nicole Minetti. Mahroug insisted that she had not slept with the then 74-year-old prime minister. She told Italian newspapers that she merely attended dinner at his mansion near Milan. El Mahroug said she sat next to Berlusconi, who later took her upstairs and gave her an envelope containing €7,000. She said he also gave her jewellery. Berlusconi came under fire for reportedly spending $1.8 million in state funds from Rai Cinema to further the career of a largely unknown Bulgarian actress, Michelle Bonev. The fact that this coincided with severe cuts being made to the country's arts budget provoked a strong reaction from the public.

In January 2011, Berlusconi was placed under criminal investigation relating to El Mahroug for allegedly having sex with an underage prostitute and for abuse of office relating to her release from detention. On 15 February 2011, a judge indicted Berlusconi to stand trial on charges carrying up to 15 years in prison. The fast-track trial opened on 6 April and was adjourned until 31 May. El Mahroug's lawyer said that Mahroug would not be attaching herself to the case as a civil complainant and denies that she ever made herself available for money. Another alleged victim, Giorgia Iafrate, also decided not to be a party to the case. In January 2013, judges rejected an application from Berlusconi's lawyers to have the trial adjourned so that it would not interfere with Italy's 2013 general election in which Berlusconi participated.

On 24 June 2013, Berlusconi was found guilty of paying for sex with an underage prostitute and of abusing his office. He was sentenced to seven years in prison, one more year than had been requested by the prosecution, and banned from public office for life. Berlusconi appealed the sentence, and his conviction was quashed a year later on 18 July 2014. In 2020, Wondery released a podcast about Berlusconi's rise and fall entitled Bunga Bunga and hosted by comedienne Whitney Cummings.

=== Panama Papers ===
In April 2016, the Panama Papers scandal broke out; it was a leaked set of 11.5 million confidential documents that provide detailed information about more than 214,000 offshore companies listed by the Panamanian corporate service provider Mossack Fonseca, including the identities of shareholders and directors of the companies. The documents show how wealthy individuals, including public officials, hid their assets from public scrutiny. Berlusconi was cited in the list, along with his long-time partner at AC Milan, Adriano Galliani.

=== Fascism and Mussolini ===
Over the years, Berlusconi has repeatedly made controversial statements about Benito Mussolini: in 1994, he stated that "Fini said that Mussolini, at a certain point in time, was a great statesman. Later, of course, he repressed freedom and led the country into war, so it's clear the final outcome is damning, but for a certain period, Mussolini did do good things, and this is a fact confirmed by history"; in 2003, that "Mussolini's was a much more ... benign dictatorship. Mussolini never killed anyone. Mussolini sent people into exile on holiday"; in 2013, that "The fact of racial laws is the worst fault of a leader, Mussolini, who in many other ways had done well"; and in 2017 that "Mussolini wasn't really a dictator, maybe" (stating immediately after that he was trying to give the newspapers something to attack him for).

== Health ==
On 13 December 2009, Berlusconi was hit in the face with a statuette of Milan Cathedral after a rally in Milan's Piazza del Duomo. The assailant was subsequently detained and identified as Massimo Tartaglia, a 42-year-old surveyor with a history of mental illness but no criminal record. Berlusconi suffered facial injuries, a broken nose and two broken teeth. He was subsequently hospitalised, and was discharged on 17 December. On 7 June 2016, after the campaign for the 2016 Italian local elections, Berlusconi was hospitalised at the San Raffaele Hospital in Milan because of heart problems. After two days, on 9 June, his personal doctor Alberto Zangrillo announced that the stroke could have killed him, and that he had to have heart surgery to replace a defective aortic valve.

On 2 September 2020, amid the worldwide COVID-19 pandemic, Berlusconi tested positive for COVID-19. He had had contact with businessman Flavio Briatore, who had been hospitalised after contracting the virus, and with his daughter Barbara and his son Luigi, who had also tested positive. The following day, Berlusconi announced he was well and continuing to work; on the next day, 3 September, he was admitted to the San Raffaele Hospital in Milan with bilateral pneumonia. Alberto Zangrillo, head of intensive care at San Raffaele Hospital, said on 11 September 2020 that Berlusconi was admitted with a very high viral load, but that he was improving and his response to the disease had been "optimal". On 14 September, he was discharged. Berlusconi described COVID-19 as "the most dangerous and frightening experience" of his life. In May 2021, he was hospitalised due to COVID-19 long-term consequences. In January 2022. Berlusconi was hospitalised for eight days to treat a severe urinary infection with strong antibiotic therapy. Due to hospitalisation, he was unable to participate in the presidential elections.

On 27 March 2023, Berlusconi was admitted to San Raffaele Hospital for three days after suffering pains. In April 2023, Berlusconi was hospitalised again at the San Raffaele Hospital in Milan, and was treated in intensive care after suffering breathing problems, due to severe pneumonia caused by chronic myelomonocytic leukemia. On 6 April, it was reported that Berlusconi had started chemotherapy. On 16 April, Berlusconi was transferred to a regular ward. In May 2023, a video of Berlusconi was played at the Forza Italia party reassuring his supporters at the party's convention in Milan. In the video, Berlusconi stated that he was ready to return to work after being hospitalised for a month, and that he had never stopped working even while in hospital. He was discharged from the hospital on 19 May, proclaiming "the nightmare" was over.

== Death ==
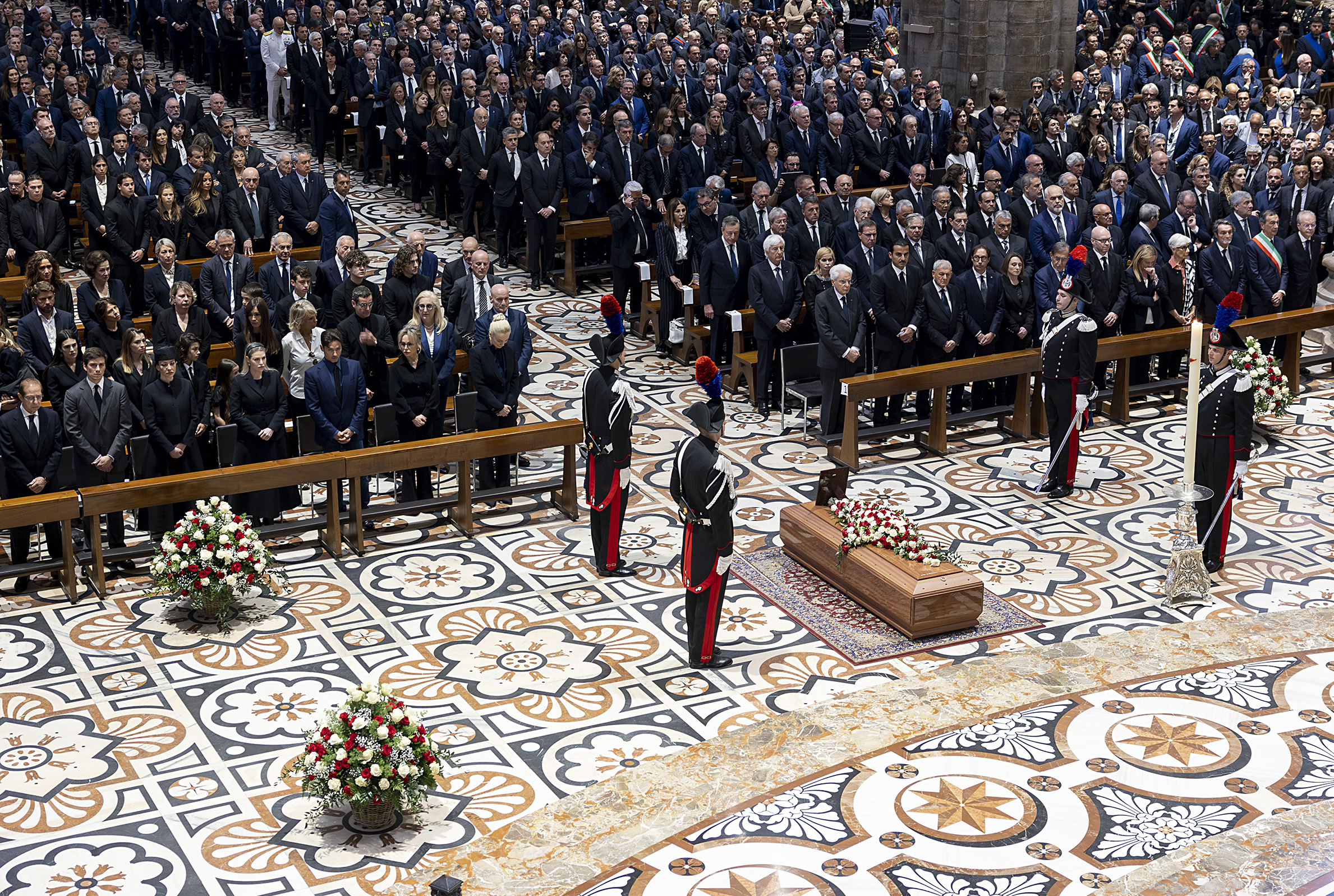
State funeral of Berlusconi at Milan Cathedral on 14 June

Having been hospitalised again on 9 June 2023, Berlusconi died on the morning of 12 June, at San Raffaele Hospital in Milan, aged 86. Italy's Council of Ministers declared a day of national mourning on the day of the funeral, also ordering that flags be flown half mast for three days; this was met with protests and polemics by some members of the centre-left coalition, as well as some jurists and political scientists.

A few hours after his death, Berlusconi's body was brought to Villa San Martino, Berlusconi's mansion in Arcore, where he lay in state in the villa's private chapel. Due to security reasons, only relatives and close friends could access the chapelle ardente. The following day, a Private Mass in memory of the deceased was celebrated in the chapel by Father Giandomenico Colombo, a priest in charge of Arcore, at the presence of relatives and close friends.

Berlusconi's state funeral was officiated in the Ambrosian Rite on 14 June in the Milan Cathedral by Mario Delpini, the Archbishop of Milan. Mons. Delpini delivered a homily on the meaning of life, mentioning some elements of Berlusconi's life (business, public life, politics), concluding that, "That's what we can say about Silvio Berlusconi: he was a man and now he will meet God." The homily caused controversy and different interpretations: it was described as "icy" by Il Fatto Quotidiano, while instead the Corriere della Sera described it as "a perfect portrait, devoid of any hypocrisy", noting that it was deeply appreciated by Berlusconi's family, while Il Foglio called it "a great homily". Il Messaggero remarked that the homily was inspired by the theology of Father Luigi Giussani, founder of Communion and Liberation.

The funeral was attended by 2,300 people in the Cathedral and 15,000 people in the square outside of it. Supporters of Berlusconi chanted C'è solo un presidente! ('There is only one president!') and applauded while the coffin was entering and then leaving the Cathedral. Anti-communist chants were also reported. Following the religious function, Berlusconi's body was transferred back to Villa San Martino; then, he was transferred to the Tempio Crematorio Valenziano Panta Rei in Alessandria, where his body was cremated. His ashes were buried in the Chapel of Saint Martin in the mansion, next to the tomb of his parents Luigi and Rosa, and his sister Maria Antonietta.

== Personal fortune ==
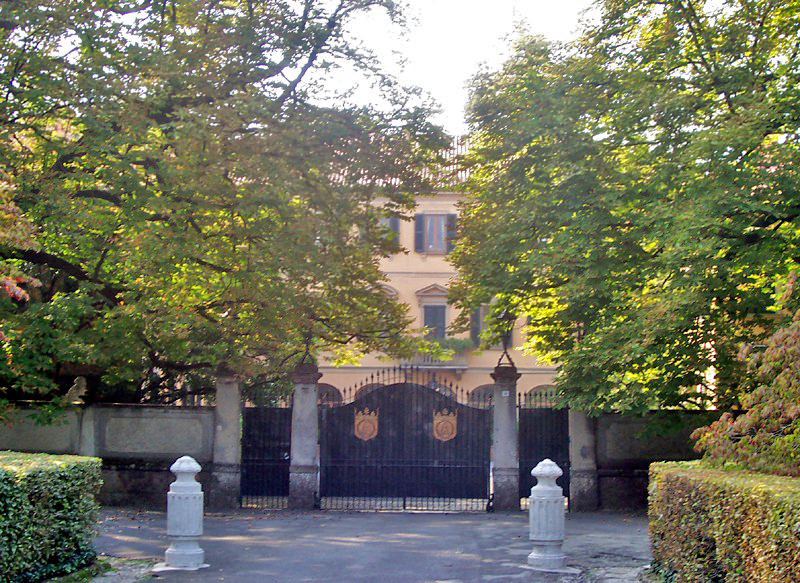
Villa San Martino, Arcore, near Milan, the personal residence of Berlusconi

In 2012, Forbes magazine reported that Berlusconi was Italy's sixth-richest man, with a net worth of $5.9 billion. He held significant assets in television, newspapers, publishing, cinema, finance, banking, insurance, and sports. However, in the summer of 2023, the Italian media estimated Berlusconi's legacy at only 4 billion euros.

Berlusconi's main company, Mediaset, operates three national television channels, which in total cover half of the national television sector; and Publitalia, the leading Italian advertising and publicity agency. Berlusconi also owned a controlling stake in Arnoldo Mondadori Editore, the largest Italian publishing house. His brother, Paolo Berlusconi, owns and operates il Giornale, a centre-right newspaper that provides a pro-Berlusconi slant on Italian politics. Il Foglio, one of the most influential Italian right-wing newspapers, is partially owned by his former wife, Veronica Lario. After Lario sold some of her ownership in 2010, Paolo Berlusconi acquired a majority interest in the newspaper. Silvio Berlusconi founded and was the major shareholder of Fininvest, which is among the largest private companies in Italy. With Ennio Doris he founded Mediolanum, one of the country's biggest banking and insurance groups. He had interests in cinema and home video distribution (Medusa Film and Penta Film). He also owned the football club AC Milan from 1986 to 2017, and owned AC Monza since 2018.

According to his will, Berlusconi bequeathed controlling shares of Fininvest to his two sons and three daughters, a sum of 100 million euros from his personal wealth to his domestic partner, Marta Fascina, another 100 million euros to his brother Paolo Berlusconi and 30 million euros to his longstanding associate, Marcello Dell'Utri.

== Electoral history ==
Election	House	Constituency	Party	Votes	Result
1994	Chamber of Deputies	Lazio 1 – Rome Centre	FI	34,354	Elected
1994	European Parliament	North-West Italy	FI	986,087	Elected
1996	Chamber of Deputies	Lombardy – Milan 1	FI	46,098	Elected
1999	European Parliament	North-West Italy	FI	992,657	Elected
2001	Chamber of Deputies	Lombardy – Milan 1	FI	42,098	Elected
2004	European Parliament	North-West Italy	FI	719,210	Elected
2006	Chamber of Deputies	Campania 1	FI	– (Note: Elected in a closed list proportional representation system.)	Elected
2008	Chamber of Deputies	Molise	PdL	–	Elected
2009	European Parliament	Southern Italy	PdL	716,093	Elected
2013	Senate of the Republic	Molise	PdL	–	Elected
2019	European Parliament	North-West Italy	FI	187,612	Elected
2022	Senate of the Republic	Lombardy – Monza	FI	231,440	Elected

=== First-past-the-post elections ===
1994 general election (C): Lazio 1 — Rome Centre
Candidate	Coalition	Votes	%
Silvio Berlusconi	Pole of Good Government	34,354	46.3
Luigi Spaventa	Alliance of Progressives	29,914	40.1
Alberto Michelini	Pact for Italy	9,566	12.8
Others		593	0.8
Total		74,607	100.0

1996 general election (C): Lombardy — Milan 1
Candidate	Coalition	Votes	%
Silvio Berlusconi	Pole for Freedoms	46,098	51.5
Michele Salvati	The Olive Tree	32,464	36.3
Umberto Bossi	Lega Nord	10,179	11.4
Others		766	0.9
Total		89,507	100.0

2001 general election (C): Lombardy — Milan 1
Candidate	Coalition	Votes	%
Silvio Berlusconi	House of Freedoms	42,098	53.7
Gianni Rivera	The Olive Tree	28,651	36.5
Others		7,709	9.8
Total		78,458	100.0

2022 general election (S): Lombardy – Monza
Candidate	Coalition	Votes	%
Silvio Berlusconi	Centre-right coalition	231,440	50.3
Federica Perelli	Centre-left coalition	124,983	27.1
Fabio Albanese	Action – Italia Viva	46,860	10.2
Others		57,195	12.41
Total		460,478	100.0

== Works by Silvio Berlusconi ==
- More, Thomas. Silvio Berlusconi (unauthorised translation by Luigi Firpo) (ed.). L'Utopia.
- Berlusconi, Silvio (2001). Una storia italiana. Mondadori.
- Pllumi, Zef (2013). Il sangue di Abele. Vivi per testimoniare (preface by Silvio Berlusconi). Diana edizioni.

== Honours and awards ==
- Italy: Knight of the Order of Merit for Labour (1977–2014); Berlusconi voluntarily resigned from this order on 18 March 2014.
- Austria: Grand Decoration in Gold with Sash of the Decoration of Honour for Services to the Republic of Austria (2002)
- Holy See: Knight Grand Cross of the Order of Pius IX (2005)
- Portugal: Grand Cross of the Order of Prince Henry (31 January 2005)
- Poland: Grand Cross of the Order of Merit of the Republic of Poland (2002)
- Latvia: Grand Officer of the Order of the Three Stars (2005)
- Libya: Recipient of the Al-Fateh Medal (2009)
- Bulgaria: Grand Cross of the Order of the Balkan Mountains (15 October 2009)
- Malta: Honorary Companion of Honour of the National Order of Merit (2004)
- Norway: Grand Cross of the Royal Norwegian Order of Merit (2001)
- Romania: Grand Cross of the Order of the Star of Romania (2002)
- Saudi Arabia: Member 1st Class of the Order of Abdulaziz al Saud (22 November 2009)
- House of Bourbon-Two Sicilies: Knight Grand Cross of the Sacred Military Constantinian Order of Saint George

=== Namesakes ===
- On 11 July 2024, Milan Malpensa Airport was officially named after Berlusconi.

== In films ==
=== Documentaries ===
- Citizen Berlusconi – The Prime Minister and the Press, 2003 (directed by Andrea Cairola and Susan Gray)
- Viva Zapatero!, directed by Sabina Guzzanti, 2005
- Quando c'era Silvio, documentary film directed by Beppe Cremagnani and Enrico Deaglio, 2005
- Berlusconi: Condemned to Win, directed by Sam Blair, 2025 – Three-part documentary for ESPN's 30 for 30 film series, examining how Berlusconi used his ownership of AC Milan as a launching pad for his political career.

=== Feature films ===
- "Bye Bye Berlusconi!/Buonanotte Topolino"
- Il Caimano (directed by Nanni Moretti, 2006)
- Videocracy (directed by Erik Gandini, 2009)
- Shooting Silvio (directed by Berardo Carboni)
- Draquila – L'Italia che trema (directed by Sabina Guzzanti, Cannes Film Festival, 2010)
- Loro (directed by Paolo Sorrentino, 2018)

== See also ==
- Forbes list of billionaires (2011)
- List of longest-serving G8 leaders
- The World's Billionaires

Political offices
Preceded by Carlo Azeglio Ciampi	Prime Minister of Italy; 1994–1995	Succeeded by Lamberto Dini
Preceded by Giuliano Amato	Prime Minister of Italy; 2001–2006	Succeeded by Romano Prodi
Preceded by Romano Prodi	Prime Minister of Italy; 2008–2011	Succeeded by Mario Monti
Diplomatic posts
Preceded by Kiichi Miyazawa	Chairperson of the Group of 7; 1994	Succeeded by Jean Chrétien
Preceded by Yoshiro Mori	Chairperson of the Group of 8; 2001	Succeeded by Jean Chrétien
Preceded by Yasuo Fukuda	Chairperson of the Group of 8; 2009	Succeeded by Stephen Harper
