= Death and state funeral of Silvio Berlusconi =

2023 state funeral in Milan, Italy

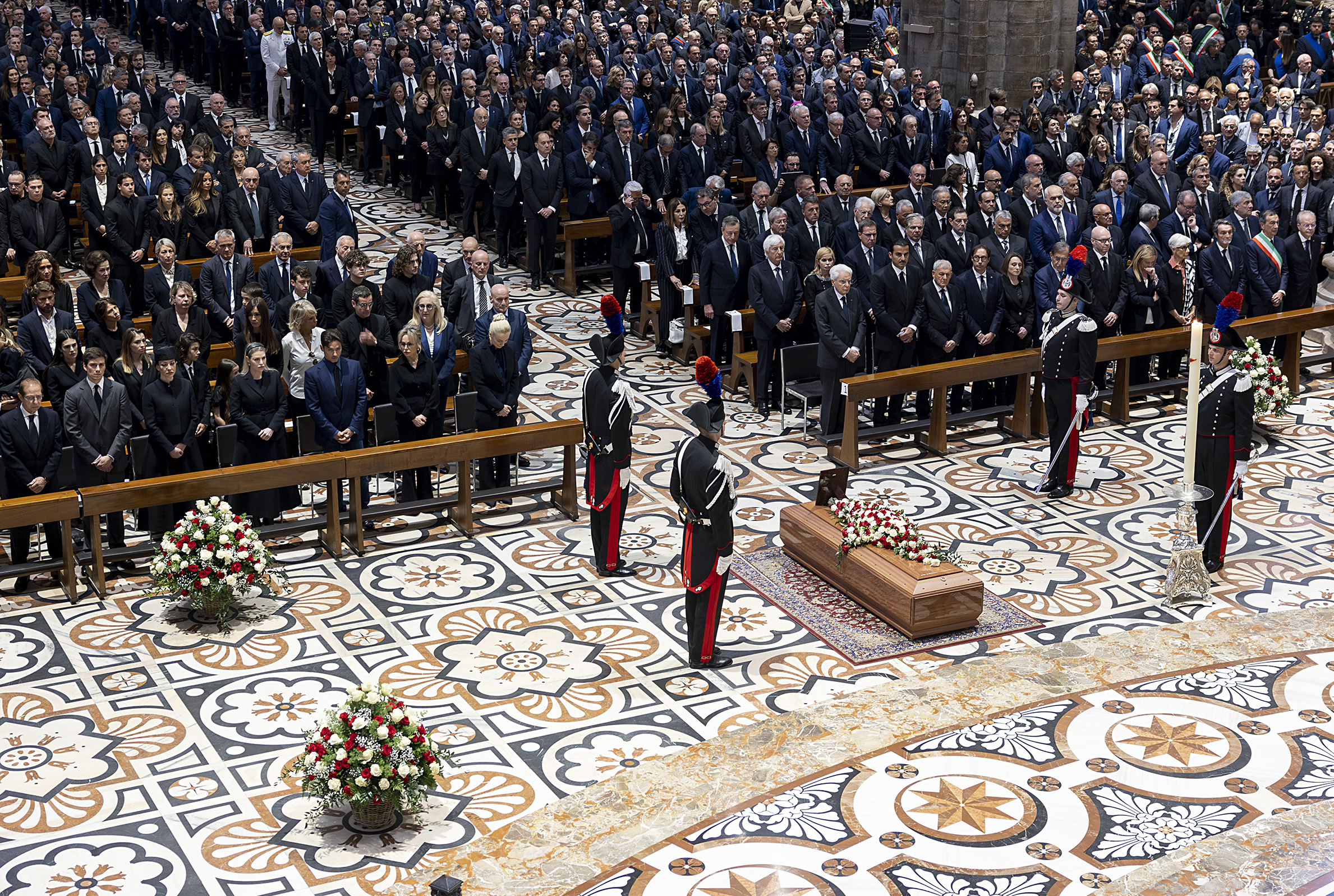
- Berlusconi's state funeral at Milan Cathedral
- Date: 09:30, 12 June 2023 (+01:00) (death); 14 June 2023 (funeral service)
- Venue: Milan Cathedral
- Location: Milan, Italy; 45°27′51″N 9°11′29″E
- Type: State funeral
- Participants: Sergio Mattarella; Mario Monti; Matteo Renzi; Paolo Gentiloni; Mario Draghi; Giorgia Meloni; Ignazio La Russa; Daniela Santanchè; Gianni Infantino
- Burial: Chapel of Saint Martin, Villa San Martino, Arcore
- Cremation: Tempio Crematorio Valenziano Panta Rei, Valenza

On 12 June 2023, former Italian prime minister Silvio Berlusconi died at the San Raffaele Hospital in Milan, aged 86, due to complications from a severe form of chronic myelomonocytic leukaemia. On the same day, the Italian government announced a state funeral and proclaimed a national day of mourning for 14 June.

== Illness and death ==
On 27 March 2023, Silvio Berlusconi was admitted to San Raffaele Hospital for three days after suffering pains. In April 2023, Berlusconi was hospitalised at the San Raffaele Hospital in Milan, and was treated in intensive care, after suffering breathing problems, due to severe pneumonia caused by a form of leukaemia. On 6 April, it was reported that Berlusconi started chemotherapy.

After being discharged from the hospital on 19 May, Berlusconi was hospitalised again on 9 June 2023. His health conditions dramatically worsened in the night between 11 and 12 June, and he died at 9:30 (CEST) on 12 June 2023. He was 86.

== Lying in state ==
A few hours after his death, Berlusconi's body was brought to Villa San Martino, Berlusconi's mansion in Arcore, where he lay in state in the villa's private chapel. Due to security reasons, only relatives and close friends could access the chapelle ardente.

The following day, a requiem Mass in memory of the deceased was celebrated in the chapel by Father Giandomenico Colombo, priest in charge of Arcore and private chaplain of the mansion, at the presence of relatives and close friends.

== Funeral ==
Italy's Council of Ministers declared a day of national mourning on the day of the funeral, also ordering that flags be flown half mast for three days; this was met with protests and polemics by some members of the centre-left coalition, as well as some jurists and political scientists.

Mario Delpini, the archbishop of Milan, officiated Berlusconi's Ambrosian Rite state funeral on 14 June 2023 in the Milan Cathedral. Monsignor Delpini delivered an homily on the meaning of life, mentioning some elements of Berlusconi's life (business, public life, and politics). He concluded: "That's what we can say about Silvio Berlusconi: he was a man and now he will meet God."

The homily caused controversy and different interpretations. It was described as "gelid" by Il Fatto Quotidiano, while the Corriere della Sera described it as "a perfect portrait, devoid of any hypocrisy", saying that it was deeply appreciated by Berlusconi's family, and Il Foglio called it "a great homily". Il Messaggero remarked that the homily was inspired by the theology of Father Luigi Giussani, founder of Communion and Liberation.

The funeral was attended by 2,300 people in the Cathedral and 15,000 people in the square outside of it. Supporters of Berlusconi chanted C'è solo un presidente! ("There is only one president!") and applauded while the coffin was entering and then leaving the Cathedral. Anti-communist chants were also reported.

=== Clergy ===
- Monsignor Mario Delpini, Archbishop of Milan
- Monsignor Gianantonio Borgonovo, archpriest of the Cathedral
- Monsignor Francesco Pesce, chaplain of the Chamber of Deputies
- Monsignor Emil Paul Tscherring, apostolic nuncio for Italy
- Father Giandomenico Colombo, priest in charge of Arcore and private chaplain of Villa San Martino

=== Guests ===
==== Family ====
- Barbara Berlusconi, daughter
- Eleonora Berlusconi, daughter
- Luigi Berlusconi, son
- Marina Berlusconi, daughter
- Pier Silvio Berlusconi, son
- Paolo Berlusconi, brother
- Marta Fascina, partner
- Veronica Lario, ex-wife
- Francesca Pascale, former partner

==== National politicians ====
Governmental officials

- President Sergio Mattarella
- Prime Minister Giorgia Meloni
- Deputy Prime Minister Matteo Salvini
- Deputy Prime Minister Antonio Tajani
- President of the Senate Ignazio La Russa
- President of the Chamber of Deputies Lorenzo Fontana
- President of the Constitutional Court Silvana Sciarra
- Former Prime Minister Mario Draghi
- Former Prime Minister Paolo Gentiloni
- Former Prime Minister Mario Monti
- Former Prime Minister Matteo Renzi
- Minister Andrea Abodi
- Minister Anna Maria Bernini
- Minister Roberto Calderoli
- Minister Marina Elvira Calderone
- Minister Elisabetta Casellati
- Minister Luca Ciriani
- Minister Guido Crosetto
- Minister Raffaele Fitto
- Minister Francesco Lollobrigida
- Minister Giancarlo Giorgetti
- Minister Nello Musumeci
- Minister Carlo Nordio
- Minister Matteo Piantedosi
- Minister Gilberto Pichetto Fratin
- Minister Gennaro Sangiuliano
- Minister Daniela Santanchè
- Minister Adolfo Urso
- Minister Giuseppe Valditara
- Minister Paolo Zangrillo
- Undersecretary Alfredo Mantovano
- Undersecretary Vittorio Sgarbi

Regional presidents

- President of Piedmont, Alberto Cirio
- President of Friuli-Venezia Giulia, Massimiliano Fedriga
- President of Liguria, Giovanni Toti
- President of Lombardy, Attilio Fontana
- President of Campania, Vincenzo De Luca
- President of Veneto, Luca Zaia

Other Italian politicians

- Leader of Action, Carlo Calenda
- Leader of Us with Italy, Maurizio Lupi
- Leader of Union of the Centre, Lorenzo Cesa
- Leader of the Democratic Party, Elly Schlein
- Leader of Forza Italia group in the Chamber of Deputies, Paolo Barelli
- Leader of Democratic Party group in the Senate of the Republic, Francesco Boccia
- Leader of Democratic Party group in the Chamber of Deputies, Chiara Braga
- Leader of Lega group in the Chamber of Deputies, Riccardo Molinari
- Leader of Action – Italia Viva group in the Senate, Raffaella Paita
- Leader of Action – Italia Viva group in the Chamber of Deputies, Matteo Richetti
- Leader of Lega group in the Senate, Massimiliano Romeo
- Leader of Forza Italia group in the Senate, Licia Ronzulli
- Deputy Umberto Bossi, president of the Lega Nord
- Deputy and leader of the Animalist Movement, Michela Vittoria Brambilla
- Senator Pier Ferdinando Casini
- Member of the European Parliament (MEP) Lara Comi
- Senator Dario Franceschini
- MEP Alessandra Mussolini
- Deputy Giulio Tremonti
- Deputy Benedetto Della Vedova
- Mayor of Viterbo, Chiara Frontini
- Gianni Letta, former Secretary of the Council of Ministers
- Mayor of Milan, Giuseppe Sala
- Denis Verdini, former coordinator of Forza Italia and former leader of the Liberal Popular Alliance
- Singer and former MEP Iva Zanicchi

==== Foreign politicians and diplomats ====
Leaders

- (Albania) Prime Minister Edi Rama
- (Hungary) Prime Minister Viktor Orbán
- (Iraq) President Abdul Latif Rashid
- (Qatar) Emir Tamim bin Hamad Al Thani
- (San Marino) Captains regent Adele Tonnini and Alessandro Scarano

Other politicians

- Paolo Gentiloni, European Commissioner for Economy
- Manfred Weber, leader of the European People's Party
- (Croatia) Foreign Minister Gordan Grlić-Radman
- (Kosovo) Foreign Minister Donika Gërvalla-Schwarz
- (Germany) Ambassador to Rome, Viktor Elbling
- (Malta) Foreign Minister Ian Borg
- (Serbia) Minister without portfolio Đorđe Milićević
- (Spain) Ambassador to Rome, Miguel Ángel Fernández-Palacios Martínez
- (Tunisia) Foreign Minister Nabil Ammar
- (Turkey) Foreign Minister Hakan Fidan
- (Turkey) Ambassador to Rome, Ömer Gücük
- (Turkey) Former Minister of European Union Affairs, Ömer Çelik
- (United Kingdom) Ambassador to Rome, Lord Llewellyn

==== Sportspeople ====
- General manager of U.S. Cremonese, Paolo Armenia
- Former footballer of AC Milan, Franco Baresi
- General manager of ACF Fiorentina, Joe Barone
- President of Torino FC, Urbano Cairo
- General manager of U.S. Sassuolo Calcio, Giovanni Carnevali
- President of Juventus FC, Gianluca Ferrero
- President of the FIFA, Gianni Infantino
- Owner of Filmauro and president of SSC Napoli, Aurelio De Laurentiis
- CEO for sport of Inter Milan, Beppe Marotta
- President of Inter Milan, Steven Zhang
- President of Football Association of Montenegro and former footballer of AC Milan, Dejan Savićević

==== Other guests ====
- President of Mediaset, Fedele Confalonieri

== Cremation and burial ==
After the religious ceremony, Berlusconi's body was brought back to Villa San Martino; he was then transferred to the Tempio Crematorio Valenziano Panta Rei in Valenza, where he was cremated. His ashes were then interred in the Chapel of Saint Martin in the mansion grounds, close to the resting place of his parents Luigi and Rosa, and his sister Maria Antonietta.

== Reactions ==
=== National ===
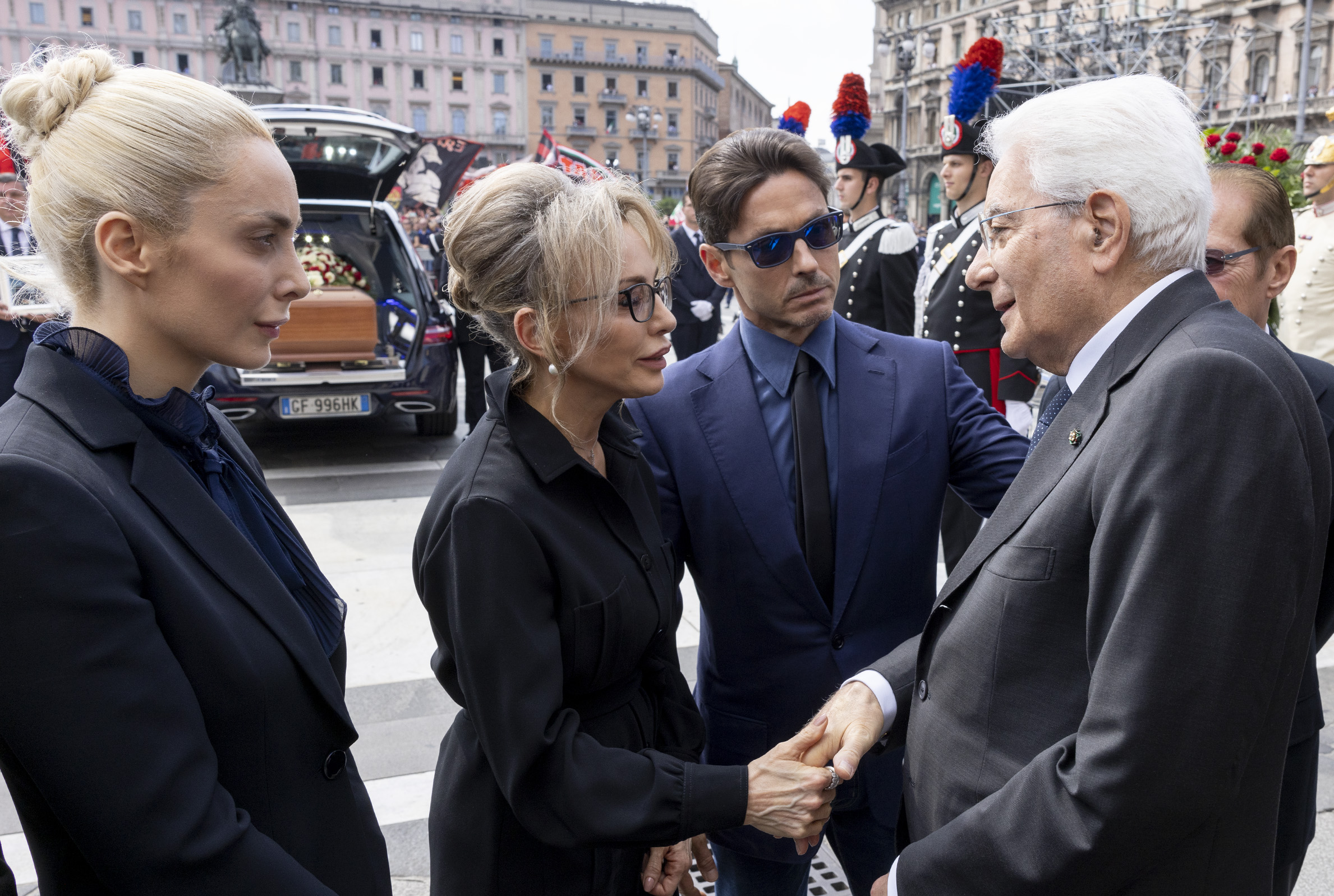
President Sergio Mattarella with Marta Fascina, Marina Berlusconi, and Pier Silvio Berlusconi

- Italy
  - President Sergio Mattarella said: "Berlusconi was a great political leader who marked the history of our republic, influencing its paradigms, uses and languages. ... He was a person with great humanity and a successful entrepreneur, an innovator in his field. He has conquered positions of absolute prominence in the television industry and in the media sector, well before his direct involvement in institutions."
  - Prime Minister Giorgia Meloni said: "Silvio Berlusconi was above all a fighter. He was a man who had never been afraid of defending his ideas and it was exactly that courage and that determination which made him one of the most influential men in the history of Italy. ... With him, Italy learned that it should never have limits imposed on it, it learned that it should never give up. With him we have fought, won and lost, many battles and for him too we will bring home the goals we set ourselves together."
  - President of the Senate Ignazio La Russa said: "There was an Italy before Silvio Berlusconi and an Italy after he entered the field of politics, just as I believe there was an Italy until yesterday and another one from tomorrow, without Berlusconi. If we look at the history of the last few decades, he has changed politics, urban planning, television, football, diplomacy. Wherever he applied, he brought about change."
  - Former Prime Minister Giuseppe Conte said: "Silvio Berlusconi was an entrepreneur and a politician who contributed to write significant pages of our history in every field in which he ventured. He has ignited and polarised the public debate perhaps like no other, and even those who have faced him as a political opponent must recognise that he has never lacked courage, passion, tenacity."
  - Former Prime Minister Mario Draghi said: "As an entrepreneur Berlusconi revolutionised the world of communication and sport, with an extraordinary spirit of initiative and innovation. As a leader he transformed politics and was loved by millions of Italians for his humanity and his charisma."
  - Former Prime Minister Romano Prodi, historically a rival of Berlusconi in politics, said: "I share my deep condolences for the passing of Silvio Berlusconi. In our long political confrontation we have represented different and opposing worlds, but our rivalry has never transcended into feelings of enmity on a personal level, maintaining the confrontation in an environment of mutual respect."
  - Former Prime Minister Matteo Renzi said: "Silvio Berlusconi made history in this country. Many loved him, many hated him: everyone today must recognise that his impact on political but also economic, sporting and television life was unprecedented. Today Italy mourns alongside his family, his loved ones, his companies, his party. To all those who loved him, my most affectionate and most sincere embrace."

=== International ===
- Armenia
  - Prime Minister Nikol Pashinyan sent his condolences to Prime Minister Meloni, "the friendly people of Italy, and the family and friends of Berlusconi".
- Austria
  - Chancellor Karl Nehammer expressed his condolences to his family and the Italian people.
- Azerbaijan
  - President Ilham Aliyev described Berlusconi as a "renowned statesman and politician" who "had a great contribution to development and expansion of friendly and cooperative relations", and expressed his condolences to his family, President Mattarella, and all the people of Italy.
- Bahrain
  - Crown Prince Salman bin Hamad Al Khalifa sent his condolences to President Mattarella.
- Belarus
  - President Alexander Lukashenko described Berlusconi as a "brilliant and talented person, a politician who knew how to assess situations independently, make effective decisions and take responsibility for them" and extended his condolences to his family and friends.
- Bulgaria
  - Minister of Foreign Affairs Mariya Gabriel said: "Sincere condolences on the passing of Silvio Berlusconi who left а memorable mark in the Italian and European political life. Deepest sympathies to his family and loved ones."
- European Union
  - Ursula von der Leyen, president of the European Commission, described Berlusconi as "a person who moulded his beloved country", and expressed her condolences to his family and Italy.
  - Roberta Metsola, president of the European Parliament, eulogised Berlusconi as "a fighter who led the centre-right and who was a protagonist of politics in Italy and Europe for generations", adding that he "will not be forgotten".
  - Charles Michel, president of the European Council, expressed his condolences to Berlusconi's family and friends.
  - Paolo Gentiloni, European Commissioner for Economy, described Berlusconi as "a leader who has left a deep mark on Italy in recent decades", and expressed his closeness to his family and to Forza Italia.
  - Christine Lagarde, president of the European Central Bank, wrote on Twitter that "former Italian Prime Minister Silvio Berlusconi has been an important figure in Italian politics for several decades. My condolences go out to his family, friends and colleagues."
  - Manfred Weber, leader of the European People's Party, declared himself to be "in pain for the death of Silvio Berlusconi", adding that "my thoughts are with his family and loved ones at this difficult time. We will not forget the energy and dedication with which he worked for his beloved Italy, for his political family and for his European ideals. May he rest in peace."
- France
  - President Emmanuel Macron mourned the loss of "a major figure of contemporary Italy", and expressed his condolences to the family and friends.
  - Marine Le Pen, former leader of the National Rally, described Berlusconi as an "atypical figure ... who undeniably marked Italy's political life", and expressed her condolences to Italy.
  - Éric Ciotti, leader of The Republicans, described Berlusconi as "a monument to politics in Italy and a great statesman" and "a fervent defensor of friendship between our two nations".
- Germany
  - A spokesperson for Chancellor Olaf Scholz expressed closeness to the Italian people and government, without adding further comments.
- (Vatican City) Holy See
  - Pope Francis said: "Silvio Berlusconi was a protagonist of Italian political life, who held public responsibilities with an energetic temper. May God grant him eternal peace and heartfelt consolation for those who mourn his departure."
- Hungary
  - President Katalin Novák commented: "God rest Silvio Berlusconi."
  - Prime Minister Viktor Orbán said: "Gone is the great fighter."
- Israel
  - Prime Minister Benjamin Netanyahu said: "My heartfelt condolences go out to his family and to the people of Italy. Silvio was a great friend of Israel and stood by us at all times. Rest in peace my friend."
- Kazakhstan
  - President Kassym-Jomart Tokayev described him as "an outstanding politician of a global scale, a charming and truly charismatic leader", and sent his condolences to Prime Minister Meloni.
- Liberia
  - President George Weah expressed "profound sadness" and offered his condolences.
- Montenegro
  - Prime Minister Dritan Abazović expressed "sincere sympathy with the friendly Italian people" in a telegram to Meloni.
  - Former president Milo Đukanović send his condolences to Berlusconi's family.
- Netherlands
  - Prime Minister Mark Rutte said: "With the death of Silvio Berlusconi, Italy has lost a strong personality. He was the first Italian prime minister I worked with, and I will remember him as a striking and passionate politician. I have conveyed my condolences to Giorgia Meloni on behalf of the Dutch government. Our thoughts are with his family and other loved ones."
- Qatar
  - Prime Minister Mohammed bin Abdulrahman bin Jassim Al Thani sent his condolences to Prime Minister Meloni.
- Russia
  - President Vladimir Putin said: "The most important events in Italy's recent history are linked to the name of this extraordinary man. As a true patriot, Silvio Berlusconi has always put the interests of his country first. ... For me, Silvio was a dear person, a true friend. I have always sincerely admired his wisdom, his ability to make balanced and far-sighted decisions even in the most difficult situations." He also stated that Berlusconi would be remembered as a "consistent and principled supporter of strengthening friendly relations between our countries."
  - Former president Dmitry Medvedev said: "We cry with you, Italy. Silvio was your patriot. We will remember him."
- Saudi Arabia
  - King Salman of Saudi Arabia expressed his condolence to President Mattarella, Berlusconi's family, and the people of Italy, wishing them to be preserved from all misfortune and harm.
  - Crown Prince Mohammed bin Salman expressed his condolence to President Mattarella and Berlusconi's family, wishing them continued health and wellbeing.
- Serbia
  - President Aleksandar Vučić described Berlusconi as "the strongest leader in the country's recent history" who "will be remembered for his bold policies that earned him the citizens' trust for many years, but also for his unique charisma", and expressed his condolence to Prime Minister Meloni and the people of Italy.
- Spain
  - Labor Minister Yolanda Díaz stated: "Of course, my condolences to his family and friends, respectfully, but please understand that the disparity of the political project that Mr. Berlusconi represented for so long does not suffer my compassion and, moreover, shows my disagreement with it."

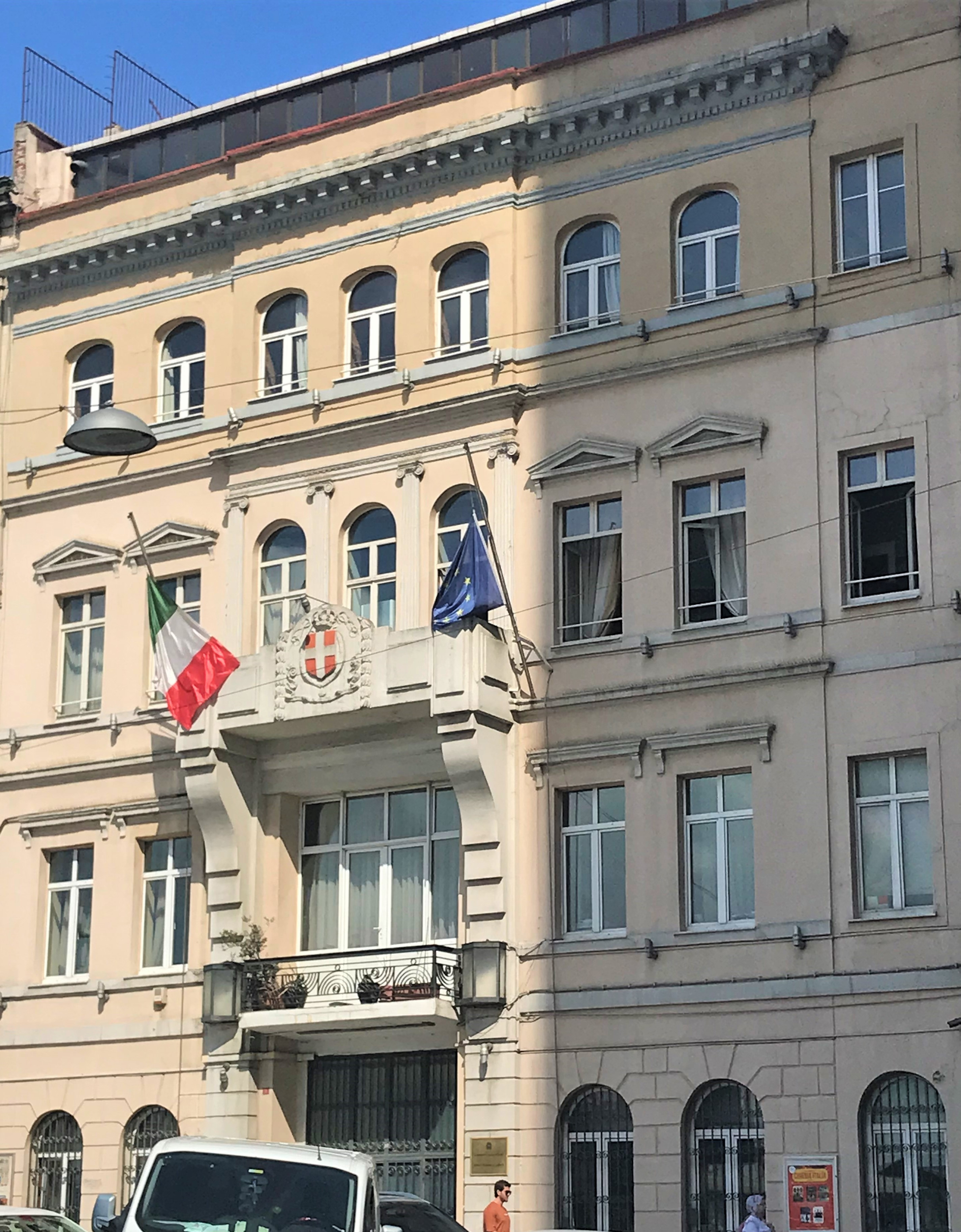
The Consulate-General of Italy in Istanbul flown half-mast Italian flag after the national mourning on 14 June 2023.

- Turkey
  - President Recep Tayyip Erdoğan said: "I am deeply saddened by the death of my dear friend Silvio Berlusconi. I convey my condolences to all Italian people."
- Turkmenistan
  - Former President and Chairman of the People's Council Gurbanguly Berdimuhamedow expressed his condolence to President Mattarella.
- United Kingdom
  - A spokesperson for Prime Minister Rishi Sunak stated: "Silvio Berlusconi made a huge impact on Italian politics over several decades, and our thoughts are with the Italian people and his family."
  - Former Prime Minister Tony Blair said: "Silvio Berlusconi was a larger than life figure with whom I worked closely for several years as Prime Minister. I know he was controversial for many but for me he was a leader whom I found capable, shrewd and, most important, true to his word."
- United States
  - Former president George W. Bush said: "Silvio Berlusconi was a vibrant leader with a personality to match. Laura and I were fortunate to spend a good deal of time with him during my presidency. There was never a dull moment with Silvio. He strengthened the friendship between Italy and the United States, and we are grateful for his commitment to our important alliance."
  - Secretary of State Antony Blinken stated: "I simply want to extend my condolences to his family, but also to the Italian people for their loss. He was obviously a tremendously significant figure in the life of Italy."

=== In sport ===
Gianni Infantino, the president of FIFA, expressed his sorrow for the death of the Italian leader. He said: "I want to remember him like this, as the person who — in our much-loved sport — he dreamed and then turned those thoughts into reality. A big hug and my deepest condolences to all those who loved him. And thank you for making us love this amazing game." Several football clubs, including Berlusconi's former club AC Milan, along with his then current club AC Monza, FC Barcelona, and Real Madrid, expressed their condolences through separate statements on their social media accounts. Several world football figures also dedicated a comment; Paolo Maldini said: "A genius, visionary and dreamer leaves us, but above all a friend who changed the history of our Italy. Thank you for everything President, you made all Milan fans live a dream that lasted more than 30 years, no one will be like you." Franco Baresi stated: "I feel more alone. For me he was like a father, a unique and endearing president for everyone. He made my dreams come true."

== Protests ==
The decision to declare a day of national mourning and the order for flags to be flown half-mast caused protests and controversy. Several members of the centre-left opposition protested against it, calling it inappropriate considering the scandals Berlusconi went through. A woman showed up in the square in front of the Milan Cathedral wearing a T-shirt stating Io non sono in lutto ("I am not mourning"); she was heavily contested by Berlusconi's supporters and eventually removed by the Polizia di Stato. A young man also protested in front of the Chamber of Deputies showing a sign stating Non il mio lutto ("Not my mourning").

Tomaso Montanari, rector of the Università per Stranieri di Siena and well-known left-wing activist, refused to fly the university's flags half-mast, calling it inappropriate and citing academic freedom; he said that by doing so for Berlusconi, his university would "lose all educational and moral credibility." He was harshly criticised by centre-right politicians and by Matteo Renzi (leader of Italia Viva and editor of Il Riformista), who called for his resignation on the grounds that the rector could be indicted for not observing public orders. A petition was launched in his support on Change.org, collecting more than 20,000 signatures. Marco Travaglio, editor of Il Fatto Quotidiano and a well-known Berlusconi critic, was harshly critical towards what he perceived as a beatification of the deceased leader, citing his multiple scandals.

Protests also came from the Communist Refoundation Party, the Greens and Left Alliance, and some members of the Democratic Party (PD). Rosy Bindi, a former member of the PD who was often the target of Berlusconi's sexist jibes, said that the national day of mourning was "disrespectful toward the majority" who opposed him. Some opposition leaders, such as Giuseppe Conte, Nicola Fratoianni, and Angelo Bonelli, refused to attend the state funeral. While expressing his condolences to Berlusconi's family and those close to him, Conte said that it would have been hypocritical otherwise, citing respect for the values and principles of the Five Star Movement, which he said has a "completely distant history" from that of Berlusconi; he criticised what he called "a public-private media system which has begun blatantly hagiographic reconstructions".

== See also ==
- Death and state funeral of Giorgio Napolitano
