= List of fictional arthropods =

This list of fictional arthropods is subsidiary to the list of fictional animals. It is restricted to notable insect, arachnid and crustacean characters from the world of fiction.

== Literature ==
Character	Species	Work	Author	Notes
Aragog	Spider	Harry Potter and the Chamber of Secrets	J. K. Rowling	Aragog is an Acromantula—an enormous, sentient spider capable of speech—who makes a unique clicking noise as he moves. Rubeus Hagrid raised him from an egg as a Hogwarts student. In his third year at Hogwarts, Hagrid was caught talking to Aragog in the dungeons by Tom Riddle, who alleged that Aragog was the "Monster of Slytherin" and that Hagrid had opened the Chamber of Secrets.
Archy	Cockroach	archy and mehitabel et seq	Don Marquis	Archy was a cockroach who had been a free verse poet in a previous life, and took to writing stories and poems on an old typewriter at the newspaper office when everyone in the building had left. Archy would climb up onto the typewriter and hurl himself at the keys, laboriously typing out stories of the daily challenges and travails of a cockroach.
Arianwen	Spider	The Snow Spider	Jenny Nimmo	
Charlotte A. Cavatica	Spider	Charlotte's Web	E. B. White	A spider who befriends Wilbur the pig; she at first seems bloodthirsty due to her method of catching food.
The Gnat	Gnat	Alice Through the Looking-Glass	Lewis Carroll	The Gnat seems to love jokes; however, he doesn't like telling them himself—he prefers others to tell the jokes.
The Louse and the Flea	Louse, Flea	The Louse and the Flea	Traditional.	Characters in a fairy tale collected by the Brothers Grimm.
Doris	Bee	Doris the Buzzy Bee		
Madam Octa	Spider	Cirque du Freak: The Saga of Darren Shan	Darren Shan	A rare if not extinct species of very large spider used by the vampire, Mr. Crepsley, to perform in his stage act, where he communicates with her telepathically. Her venomous bite is extremely deadly, as shown when she bites Steve Leonard and he almost dies (surviving only thanks to antivenin).
Maya	Bee	Maya the Bee	Waldemar Bonsels	Main character in a popular series of German children's novels, later adapted into films and TV animated series.
Mr. Mosquito	Mosquito	Ricky Ricotta's Mighty Robot vs. the Mutant Mosquitos from Mercury	Dav Pilkey	The main antagonist of the book. He hates living on Mercury because the extreme temperatures ruin his everyday activities. In order to deal with these issues, he decides to take over Earth with the help of some mutant mosquitoes he created with his fingernails.
Miss Spider	Spider	Miss Spider	David Kirk	
Miss Spider	Spider	James and the Giant Peach	Roald Dahl	
Seven flies	Fly	The Brave Little Tailor	Traditional.	The plot of this famous fairy tale by the Brothers Grimm is set in motion by the fact that the tailor kills seven flies in one blow. When he brags about this people assume he is talking about giants, causing the king to send him away on a mission to kill a giant that torments the country.
Shelob	Spider	The Lord of the Rings	J. R. R. Tolkien	A giant spider from J. R. R. Tolkien's Middle-earth legendarium. She appears at the end of the fourth book, second volume (The Two Towers) of The Lord of the Rings. She is said to be a child of Ungoliant.
Sergeant Stinkbug	Stinkbug	Ricky Ricotta's Mighty Robot vs. the Stupid Stinkbugs from Saturn	Dav Pilkey	The main antagonist of the book. He is the worst litterbug living on Saturn, and he grows to hate living on Saturn because of how polluted it is. He decides to take over Earth so he can pollute a new planet, but this attempt is not successful.
Ungoliant	Spider	The Silmarillion	J. R. R. Tolkien	Described as an evil spirit in the form of a spider. She is mentioned briefly in The Lord of the Rings, and plays a supporting role in The Silmarillion. Her origins are unclear, as Tolkien's writings only reveal than that she is from "before the world". She is one of a few instances, along with Tom Bombadil and the Cats of Queen Berúthiel.
Manticore	Arachnid	A Song of Ice and Fire	George R.R. Martin	Is said to possess highly toxic venom and is incredibly aggressive and dangerous species of spider. While small, are shown to be incredibly fast and agile. Also portrayed in the TV series adaptation Game of Thrones

=== Comics ===
Character	Species	Work	Notes
Amedee	Fly	Urbanus	One of Urbanus' pets. He is able to talk and by far the most intelligent character in the series, bordering to genius.
Bug Daddy and Chile	Bugs	Pogo	
Ferdy the Ant	Ant	Ferda Mravenec	Created by Ondřej Sekora and adapted in an animated TV series in 1984. He is an adventurous, hard working ant who is in love with Miss Ladybird.
Gnorm Gnat	Gnat	Gnorm Gnat	A gnat who Davis says plays the "straight man" who sometimes behaves like the character Walter Mitty.
Serenity/Twinkly Herbert/Dr. Blinkbottom	Firefly	Homestuck	Serenity is a small firefly which speaks Morse Code, to inspire her friends.
Hawthorne	Hermit crab	Sherman's Lagoon	The scheming hermit crab of the strip. He is rude, abrasive, insulting, stingy, and a borderline criminal. Hawthorne, unlike other hermit crabs, prefers a beer can rather than a seashell.
Maya	Bee	The Adventures of Maya the Bee	
Michael	Bee	Quality Comics	Michael is a bee who is the companion of Red Bee. He possesses heightened intelligence and the ability to sting targets multiple times without dying.
Miz flea	Flea	Pogo	
The Mother Grub	Mother Grub	Homestuck	The Mother Grub is the parental figure of Kanaya, and lays the eggs of the troll species.
Reggie and Alf	Unspecified insects	Pogo	
Scarrafone	Cockroach	Pinky	An expert in road dustbins.
Weber	Ladybird	Weber	A ladybird in paper hat and star of Gommaar Timmermans' comic series Weber.

=== Legends ===
Character	Species	Origin	Notes
Anansi	Spider	West Africa	Ananse tales are some of the best-known in West Africa. The stories made up an exclusively oral tradition, and indeed Ananse himself was synonymous with skill and wisdom in speech. It was as remembered and told tales that they crossed to the Caribbean and other parts of the New World with captives via the Atlantic slave trade.
Arachne	Spider	Ancient Greece	Arachne was a talented mortal weaver who challenged Athena, goddess of wisdom and crafts, to a weaving contest; this hubris resulted in her being transformed into a spider.
Jorōgumo	Spider	Japan	A spider demon who can shapeshift into a seductive woman.

== Media ==
=== Film ===
Character	Species	Work	Notes
Alpha Scorpion	Scorpion	The Black Scorpion	A giant black scorpion which kills every other giant scorpion and raids Mexico City.
Antie	Ant	Honey, I Shrunk the Kids	A baby worker ant who befriends the Szalinski and Thompson children and helps them traverse the backyard.
Buzz and Scuzz	Horsefly	Racing Stripes	Two horse-fly brothers who each have a taste in music.
Caterpillar	Caterpillar	The Adventures of Elmo in Grouchland	A yellow caterpillar who teaches Elmo how to be brave.
Dim	Rhinoceros beetle	A Bug's Life	A large blue beetle and member of P. T. Flea's circus.
Katy	Caterpillar	Katy La Oruga	A green caterpillar, who is full of curiosity and up for adventure.
Mooch	Green bottle fly	G-Force	A green bottle fly who is a member of the G-Force.
Mothra	Moth	Mothra	
Onibaba	Crustacean	Pacific Rim	Resembles a crustacean and Japanese temple. It is best known for orphaning Mako Mori during the Kaiju attacks.
Kumonga	Spider	Son of Godzilla	

=== Television ===
Character	Species	Work	Notes
Antales	Kaiju-like scorpion	Ultraman Leo	
Banpira	Kaiju-like spider	Ultraman Nexus	
Barry	Honey bee	Jim Henson's Animal Show	A puppet honey bee
Cococinel	Ladybird	Cococinel	Main character in a French-Belgian children's TV series.
Cornelius	Crab	Jim Henson's Animal Show	A puppet crab
The Killer Bees	Killer bees	Saturday Night Live	A group of bees in a recurring sketch on the show
Max	Wasp	Jim Henson's Animal Show	A puppet wasp
Maya	Bee	Maya the Bee	Main character in a popular German TV series based on the original novels.
Morris	Ant	Jim Henson's Animal Show	A puppet ant
Natasha	Tarantula	Jim Henson's Animal Show	A puppet tarantula
Nimetz	Ant	Jim Henson's Animal Show	A puppet ant
Nippy	Tiger beetle	Jim Henson's Animal Show	A puppet tiger beetle
Pepe the King Prawn	Prawn	Muppets Tonight	
Rudy	Spider	Jim Henson's Animal Show	A puppet spider
Seymour	Spider	H.R. Pufnstuf	One of Witchiepoo's assistants.
Nahoul	Bumblebee	Tomorrow's Pioneers	An anti-Semitic bumblebee who acted as co-host for the series between July and February 2007.
Tizzy	Bee	Jim Henson's Animal Show	A computer generated bee
Winnie	Wasp	Jim Henson's Animal Show	A puppet wasp
Yves St. La Roache	Cockroach	Jim Henson's Animal Show	A puppet cockroach

=== Animation ===
Character	Species	Work	Notes
Armen	Hermit crab	Under the Boardwalk	An awkward, teased beach crab from New Jersey who gets swept away and finds true love in Ramona on the way back. He is voiced by Michael Cera.
Atom Ant	Ant	The Atom Ant/Secret Squirrel Show	A superhero, created by Hanna-Barbera in 1965. Atom costarred in The Atom Ant/Secret Squirrel Show (sharing top billing with Secret Squirrel). In syndication, Atom Ant aired alongside Precious Pupp and The Hillbilly Bears.
B.A.H. Humbug	Insect fictional	The Stingiest Man in Town	
Barry B. Benson	Honey bee	Bee Movie	Barry B. Benson (voiced by Jerry Seinfeld) is "just an ordinary bee" in a hive in Sheep Meadow, Central Park in New York City.
Bim Heimlich	Caterpillar	A Bug's Life	An overweight caterpillar who speaks with a German accent and longs to be a butterfly.
Bumble	Bumblebee	Fifi and the Flowertots	Bumble, also known as Fuzzbuzz in the United States, is Fifi's best friend who isn't good at landing.
Cecil	Caterpillar	The Secret of NIMH 2: Timmy to the Rescue	A caterpillar who helps Timmy and Jenny on their journey.
Charotte	Honey bee	Jewelpet	A yellow and brown striped honey bee who is the Challenging Spirit (in the case of Jewelpet Twinkle, she symbolizes the Confusion Removal). She wears a flower-shaped purple jewel necklace and a purple crystal bow on her head. She has fuchsia antennae and her stinger is thistle-colored.
Chip and Skip	Dung beetle	Camp Lazlo	Two clueless beetle twins.
Crazy Joe	Hermit crab	Shark Tale	Voiced by David P. Smith, he is a deranged hermit crab who lives in a dumpster near the Whalewash.
Cri-Kee	Cricket	Mulan	A cricket who is a sidekick of Mushu.
Digit	Cockroach	An American Tail	
Echizen Crab	Crab	Sabagebu!	
Eugene H. Krabs	Crab	SpongeBob SquarePants	The greedy, money-loving founder and owner of the Krusty Krab restaurant, where SpongeBob works as a frycook.
Francoeur	Flea	A Monster in Paris	
Gregory	Cricket	Dragon Ball Z	
Jiminy Cricket	Cricket	Pinocchio	The Walt Disney version of "The Talking Cricket" (Italian: Il Grillo Parlante), a fictional character created by Carlo Collodi for his children's book Pinocchio, which was adapted into an animated film by Disney in 1940. Originally an unnamed, minor character in Collodi's novel.
Dee Dee, Joey and Marky	Cockroach	Oggy and the Cockroaches	The three main character cockroaches from the show.
Flik	Ant	A Bug's Life	An individualist and would-be inventor.
Frank	Tarantula	The Loud House	The school's pet tarantula.
Hal	Cockroach	WALL-E	A cockroach who is WALL-E's friend.
Hardcase	Tiger beetle	Turbo Fast	A tiger beetle who envies Turbo's fame and wishes to outrace him, even resorting to cheating. He does not tolerate losing, and even threatens to ravage Turbotown until he wins a race.
Hayaku	Cricket	Turbo Fast	A Japanese cricket who pretends to be in love with Turbo in order to beat him.
Herbert	Flea	T.U.F.F. Puppy	A tough, strict and good-natured flea who is the leader of T.U.F.F.
Herman	Beetle	Bootle Beetle	A beetle who is a nemesis of Donald Duck.
Hopper	Grasshopper	A Bug's Life	The main antagonist of the film who is the ruthless leader of the grasshopper gang.
Hova	Ant	The Ant Bully	A worker ant who is assigned to teach Lucas about the ways of the ant.
Hutch the Honeybee	Honeybee	The Adventures of Hutch the Honeybee	The son of a Queen bee, Hutch is separated from his mother when his native beehive is destroyed by an attack of wasps. The series follows Hutch as he searches for his missing mother, in the midst of a frequently hostile nature.
Jacques	Cleaner shrimp	Finding Nemo	A French-accented cleaner shrimp who likes to clean the tank.
Jeff	Spider	The Grim Adventures of Billy & Mandy	A giant spider who believes Billy is his father.
Maggie Pesky	Fly	The Buzz on Maggie	A 13 year old teenage fly who dreams of becoming a rock star. She attends Buzzdale Academy with her best friend Rayna Cartflight and her arch nemesis Dawn Swatworthy. She has her mother and father named Frieda and Chauncey Pesky, her little sister who is a maggot named Bella Pesky, and has her younger and older brothers named Pupert and Aldrin Pesky. She is voiced by Jessica DiCicco.
Ms. Tarantula	Redknee tarantula	The Bad Guys	A sharp-tongued, equally sarcastic expert hacking redknee tarantula also known as "Webs" or "Mata Hairy" and the only female of the gang.
Larry the Lobster	Lobster	SpongeBob SquarePants	A muscular red lobster who frequently lifts weights at Goo Lagoon.
Pinchy	Lobster	The Simpsons	A lobster Homer buys to fatten up and eat in the episode "Lisa Gets an "A"".
Ray	Firefly	The Princess and the Frog	Ally of Tiana and Prince Naveen.
Sebastian	Crab	The Little Mermaid	(full name Horatio Thelonious Ignacious Crustaceous Sebastian), he is a red Jamaican crab, the servant of King Triton.
Sheldon J. Plankton	Planktonic copepod	SpongeBob SquarePants	Owner of the Chum Bucket and arch enemy of Mr. Krabs. He is always trying to steal the Krabby Patty Secret Formula but is always unsuccessful.
Spike	Bee	Cartoon Disney Shorts	A small aggressive bee who is frequently an enemy of Donald and Pluto. In many of his appearances he is on a quest to gather food. He is a one-time friend to Donald in the Disney short Let's Stick Together (1952)
Tamatoa	Coconut crab	Moana	A giant crustacean who battles Moana and Maui when they visit Lalotai, the realm of monsters. He is voiced by Jemaine Clement.
Taxi Crab	Crab	Jungle Junction	A crab who runs a smoothie shop
The Ants	Ant	Happy Tree Friends	A family of ants are the recurring characters who kills or tortures Sniffles. The Ants get revenge by torturing and killing the anthropomorphic anteater in the most sadistic ways possible, most notably in Crazy Ant-ics, Tongue Twister Trouble, A Hard Act to Swallow, Suck It Up and Tongue in Cheek.
The weevils	Bugs	Iggy Arbuckle	
Wally B.	Bumblebee	The Adventures of André & Wally B.	Wally B. is a large quadrupedal bee who teases André after the latter woke up. Although Wally is a drone bee, he has a stinger that bends once stung.
Wanna-Bee	Bee	T.U.F.F. Puppy	Wanna-Bee is a member of F.L.O.P.P. who first appeared in "The Spelling Bee", where he temporarily operated his stand-alone villain career as the Spelling Bee.
Wilbur	Grasshopper	Cartoon Disney Shorts	Goofy's tamed grasshopper.
Z	Ant	Antz	An individualistic but meek worker ant.
Zorak	Mantis	Space Ghost	

== Video games ==
Character	Species	Work	Notes
Buck Bumble	Bee	Buck Bumble (N64)	
Contessa	Black widow	Sly 2: Band of Thieves	While the majority of her is a black widow spider, she has the upper body of a human and the pincers of a scorpion as well.
Charmy	Bee	Sonic the Hedgehog	Charmy Bee (チャーミー・ビー, Chāmī hachi) is a bee who is the "scatter-brained funny-kid" of the Chaotix. He is cheerful, curious, playful, careless, and greatly energetic, often talking about things no one else cares about. Charmy's fooling around makes the rest of the detective agency staff look professional, and he is generally seen as a "cute mascot". Despite an innocent, good-natured and light-hearted personality, he uses his stinging tail on rare occasions that he gets angry.
King Zing	Bee	Donkey Kong Country	King Zing (キングＢ, Kingu Bī) is the giant king of the Zingers, fought in the Krazy Kremland level in Donkey Kong Country 2: Diddy's Kong Quest as the game's fourth boss, and the same level in Donkey Kong Land 2 as the fifth boss.
Moskito	Mosquito	Rayman	Moskito is a giant mosquito, fought in the Moskito's Nest level, the last of the Dream Forest's levels, in Rayman as the game's first boss.
Murfy	Green bottle fly	Rayman	Murfy is a greenbottle who appeared for the first time in the video game Rayman 2: The Great Escape, where he is nicknamed the "flying encyclopaedia". He has a hasty nature and he appears bored with his job.
Queen B.	Bee	Donkey Kong Country	Queen B. is the giant queen of the Zingers, fought in the Bumble B Rumble level in Donkey Kong Country as the game's third boss.
Queen Bee	Bee	Mario	Queen Bee is the queen of the Honeyhive Galaxy and the Honeyhop Galaxy in Super Mario Galaxy and Super Mario Galaxy 2. She is an extremely large bee who is the ruler of the Worker Bees. She also appeared in Mario Kart 7 as an unlockable racer.
Roger Samms	Cockroach	Bad Mojo	An entomologist with his soul and mind transferred into the body of cockroach and is forced to travel through the dangerous dilapidated bar he lives in.
Zapper	Cricket	Zapper: One Wicked Cricket	A mean and manipulative cricket who uses his little grub brother as a TV aerial.

== Other ==
- Bee – a bee in Suzy's Zoo
- Buzz Bee – a bee mascot from Honey Nut Cheerios cereal
- Bee – a mythical creature
- Buzz – a bee mascot for the Georgia Institute of Technology
- Flooty – a butterfly in Suzy's Zoo
- Emmet – a heraldic beast
- Loopy – a bee mascot from Honey Loops cereal
- Mundi - a ladybug from Doki
- Jollibee – a red bee who is the mascot of the fast-food company of the same name.
- Tickle – a ladybug in Suzy's Zoo
- Zoom Zoom – a grasshopper in Suzy's Zoo
- Endermite – a silverfish-related arthropod from Minecraft

== See also ==
- List of fictional invertebrates
- List of films featuring insects
