= Berlusconi (disambiguation) =

Silvio Berlusconi (1936–2023) was an Italian media tycoon and politician.

Berlusconi may also refer to:

== People ==
- Berlusconi family, relatives of Silvio Berlusconi, in particular:
  - Barbara Berlusconi (born 1984), businesswoman, daughter of Silvio
  - Marina Berlusconi (born 1966), businesswoman, daughter of Silvio
  - Paolo Berlusconi (born 1949), newspaper editor, brother of Silvio
  - Pier Silvio Berlusconi (born 1969), entrepreneur, son of Silvio

== Other uses ==
- Trofeo Luigi Berlusconi, an annual friendly football match
- No Berlusconi Day, spontaneous mass political event
- Pizza Berlusconi, a reindeer pizza sold by Finnish chain Kotipizza
