= Harmony Gold USA =

American entertainment company

Harmony Gold USA, Inc.
- Trade name: Harmony Gold
- Type: Private company
- Industry: Film, television
- Founded: 1983; 43 years ago
- Headquarters: Los Angeles, California, U.S.
- Key people: Frank Agrama, Chairman; Jehan F. Agrama, President and CEO; Christy Pawlak, President and General Counsel; Tommy Yune, President of animation; Steve Yun, webmaster
- Website: www.harmonygold.com

Harmony Gold USA, Inc. is an American entertainment company. It was founded in 1983 by Egyptian-born Frank Agrama and is managed by his daughter, Jehan F. Agrama.

In 1976, Agrama sold broadcast rights from Paramount Pictures to the Mediaset media conglomerate. It is best known as the distributor of the Shaka Zulu miniseries and for various anime series, notably Robotech.

The company worked closely with Intersound, a Los Angeles–based post-production recording studio, managed by Frank's son, Ahmed Agrama. They were responsible for partially dubbing Dragon Ball, Magical Princess Minky Momo and Dr. Slump before going out of business in 2006.

In addition to its distribution and production interests, Harmony Gold manages several real estate properties in the Southern California area. They also operate a screening room in Los Angeles.

== History ==
=== Beginnings in late 1970s ===
In 1976, Frank Agrama began selling broadcast rights from Paramount Pictures to his friend, former Italian Prime Minister Silvio Berlusconi's Mediaset media company. In the late 1970s, Agrama, while in a trade fair in Cannes, France, met Hong Kong entrepreneurs Paddy Chan Mei-yiu and Katherine Hsu May-chun. The three agreed to form a collaboration to trade movie rights internationally. Chan set up Hong Kong–based company Harmony Gold Limited in 1979, while Agrama set up Agrama Film Enterprises on Sunset Boulevard in Los Angeles. In 1983, Agrama founded Harmony Gold USA. He later also became the Los Angeles commercial representative of another of Chan's companies, Wiltshire Trading.

=== The 1980s: notable projects ===
==== Shaka Zulu (1983–1986) ====
In late 1983, Agrama negotiated a deal with the South African Broadcasting Corporation (SABC) to distribute the controversial Shaka Zulu miniseries in spite of the economic sanctions at the time. The planned 10-episode miniseries was based on the story of the king of the Zulu, Shaka (reigned 1816 to 1828), and the writings of the British traders with whom he interacted.

Throughout 1984 and 1985, the original budget of about $1.75 million escalated quickly to $12 million, and the SABC justified the outlay to anticipated returns to be earned on the international market. Frank Agrama, however, noted the production was a "calculated gamble." Shaka Zulu had in fact, become the most expensive miniseries ever produced for television syndicate in the United States without pre-commitment to network or operation time to date. To ensure its marketability, Harmony Gold demanded that the well known white 'stars' appeared in the first episode to satisfy US advertisers, contrary to original script. The SABC's involvement was also completely removed for its international release due to legal implications set by apartheid. The opening credits featured Harmony Gold, with Frank Agrama listed as associate producer.

Shaka Zulu went on to become a massive success worldwide, and has developed a cult following since its premiere in 1986. It has been the most repeatedly screened miniseries ever shown on syndicated television in the United States. By 1992, it had been seen by over 350 million viewers. The series dislodged John Marshall's The Hunters and the later The Gods Must be Crazy film series as the prime shaper of American perceptions of 'tribal' history in Southern Africa. Despite its success, the SABC failed to recoup the cost of their production due to unfair terms negotiated by Harmony Gold during production.

==== Robotech (1985) ====
In the mid-1980s, Harmony Gold hired Carl Macek to adapt Japanese animated programming for American broadcast release. Macek originally wanted to adapt The Super Dimension Fortress Macross only, but was instead forced to combine it with two other anime series together, even though they had no relation to Macross. These three series combined became Robotech. The other two series used are:

1. Super Dimension Cavalry Southern Cross
2. Genesis Climber MOSPEADA

Harmony Gold's cited reasoning for combining these unrelated series was its decision to market Macross for American weekday syndication television, which required a minimum of 65 episodes at the time (thirteen weeks at five episodes per week). Macross and the two other series each had fewer episodes than required, since they originally aired in Japan as weekly series. The production was successful enough to merit an American produced movie and a spin-off, Robotech II: The Sentinels. Due to unforeseen economic circumstances, production was cancelled.

=== Late 1980s to early 2000s ===
In 1987, Harmony Gold USA signed a deal to distribute international feature films for syndication, which was dubbed by Harmony Gold themselves, and the skein comprises itself of the 25 90-minute films in the Série Noire collection of films that were produced by Hamster Films of Paris, and Harmony Gold had to take the Série Noire films to the U.S. and other English-language markets for the viewing area. That year, Harmony Gold USA collaborated with international backers, including Société Française de Productions and Reteeurope, both of the respective French, Italian and Spanish interests to set up a new project, and what the worldwide market represented to set up the Harmony Premiere Network, which was to be the next Operation Prime Time, and brings together U.S. and international financers to co-produce the products for Harmony Gold.

In 1987, the company had teamed up with Italian company Silvio Berlusconi Communications to pay $150 million for a pact, to turn out 100 hours of television programming, and partnering will be dubbed by America 5 Enterprises, which will produce miniseries, TV series and telefilms using U.S. and international talent, and the two companies will share equally in costs and profits, and the company would handle worldwide and domestic television rights, with the exception of Europe, where distribution of the company will be handled through Berlusconi arm Reteitalia.

In 1988, after the cancellation of Robotech II: The Sentinels, a number of the staff were recruited to work at Saban Entertainment. Carl Macek, along with his friend Jerry Beck went on to found Streamline Pictures. Meanwhile, Harmony Gold began moving away from production and began focusing more on film distribution, dot-com ventures and real estate.

In 1998, Harmony Gold came under some scrutiny by several media executives for their role as a 'middleman' selling Paramount Pictures distribution rights to Mediaset.

From 1999 to the early 2000s, the company began reverting to film production once again. They partnered with Netter Digital and hired Carl Macek to write Robotech 3000, which would have been an American produced spinoff of the original series. A promotional trailer was screened at the 2000 FanimeCon anime convention, and was widely panned by fans. Tatsunoko Productions attempted to salvage the project, to no avail.

In 2000, the company produced Abe & Bruno, a family film about a gorilla on the run directed by Henri Charr.

=== 2000s and beyond ===
Harmony Gold began heavily pushing Robotech, first by releasing the series via a partnership with ADV Films in the US, and Manga Entertainment in the UK. In 2006, they partnered with FUNimation Entertainment to release the American produced Robotech: The Shadow Chronicles on home video.

In August 2014, Harmony Gold released their first direct-to-video live-action feature in over a decade, The Big Goofy Secret of Hidden Pines. Directed by Henri Charr, the film revolves around the comedic antics of two vacationers after they stumble upon Bigfoot.

== Legal problems ==
Harmony Gold and its founder, Frank Agrama, have had an extensive history of legal troubles beginning in the early 2000s. Italian investigators discovered and froze bank accounts in Switzerland; five belonging to Agrama. According to another Italian daily, the Corriere della Sera, the five accounts are said to contain SFr140 million ($109.5 million). This early investigation led to two high-profile trials.

=== Mediaset conviction ===
On November 29, 2006, federal agents raided Agrama's home and offices in connection with Italy's ongoing tax fraud, embezzlement and false accounting investigation of its former Prime Minister Silvio Berlusconi. Court documents revealed the recent search by FBI agents centered on Italian allegations that Agrama, Berlusconi and others fraudulently inflated the price of television rights originally purchased by Agrama so that millions of dollars in kickbacks could be paid to executives of Berlusconi's Mediaset media empire.

On October 26, 2012, Agrama was convicted after a lengthy trial involving the buying and selling of US film rights to the Mediaset media company at inflated prices. As his age exceeded 70 years, he was exempted from direct imprisonment and served no actual jail time. According to the Los Angeles Times, on November 21, 2006, prosecutors in Milan, Italy, charged Agrama, along with Berlusconi and ten others, in a trial over tax fraud, embezzlement and false accounting at Mediaset.

=== Mediatrade acquittal ===
In October 2011, Paddy Chan Mei-yiu and Katherine Hsu May-chun, along with nine others (including Frank Agrama and Pier Silvio Berlusconi, son of Silvio Berlusconi), were indicted by a Milan court and charged with buying rights for US television series and movies, then reselling them to broadcasting rights firm Mediatrade (a subsidiary of Mediaset) at inflated prices and laundering the money in a complex scheme. The four companies allegedly involved in this scheme were Wiltshire Trading, Harmony Gold, CS Secretaries and Loong Po Management.

According to prosecutors, Chan met Agrama in Cannes, France, in the late 1970s at a trade fair and they decided to form a partnership to trade movie rights internationally. Chan organized a Hong Kong–based Harmony Gold Limited in 1979, records from the city's Companies Registry show. In the same year, Agrama organized Agrama Film Enterprises on Sunset Boulevard in Los Angeles. Four years later, he set up Harmony Gold. He later also became the Los Angeles representative of another Hong Kong company established by Chan, Wiltshire Trading.

Prosecutors estimated the illicit profits between 1988 and 1999 amounted to US$170 million. Earlier in 2005, Swiss investigators froze 150 million francs (HK$1.29 billion) at a UBS branch in Lugano belonging to Harmony Gold, Wiltshire Trading and other companies.

On July 24, 2014, Variety reported that some of the charges have been dropped due to expiring statute of limitations. An appeals hearing was set to take place January 20, 2016. On January 18, 2016, all charges against Frank Agrama and five other people were dropped. Berlusconi and Mediaset Chairman Fedele Confalonieri were convicted and were sentenced to 13 months of imprisonment.

== Legal issues regarding Macross copyright ==
Harmony Gold, via its license of Robotech, is the co-copyright owner in the US for images of mecha from the component series of the show, Super Dimension Fortress Macross, Super Dimension Cavalry Southern Cross, and Genesis Climber MOSPEADA. They have pursued multiple lawsuits against anyone using mecha which even vaguely resemble these designs.

Most notably, many early designs used in BattleTech, such as the Warhammer, Valkyrie, and Marauder, were licensed directly from the Japanese producers of Macross, with the overlapping rights mistake not being realized for nearly a decade. Harmony Gold sued BattleTech's publisher, FASA, and as a result these designs were removed from the game. Fan outcry over "The Unseen" has led to multiple attempts to negotiate deals allowing for resumed use of the designs, but despite in one case a sourcebook going to press before being abruptly pulled, no deal has ever been reached. As a result of the failed negotiations, the producers of BattleTech ruled that any designs not developed in house would no longer be used in order to avoid future issues.

Harmony Gold issued cease and desist orders against sites displaying images and trailers from the discontinued video game MechWarrior, due to one of the mechs used in the trailer being a Warhammer. The company claims that the images portray "mechs that they own the rights to, according to a legal settlement from 1996".

In 2013, Harmony Gold claimed in federal court that Hasbro's SDCC 2013 exclusive set "G.I. Joe and the Transformers: The Epic Conclusion" violated their copyright license and trademarks on the animated Japanese Macross TV series (1982–1984). On September 23, 2013, Harmony Gold's suit against Hasbro was dismissed with prejudice, and Hasbro was allowed to continue to sell the sets.

The legal status of Harmony Gold's license to Macross was dubious. Harmony Gold's license for Macross came from Tatsunoko Production, but Japanese courts ruled that it was Studio Nue (creators of the series) that controls the Macross intellectual property. However, a 2003 ruling in the Tokyo District Court ruled that Tatsunoko Productions had the authorship rights to the franchise. This was against an October 2002 ruling where the design of the Valkyrie was awarded to Studio Nue.

The license Tatsunoko was given was for international distribution outside Japan only, and does not allow them to control the intellectual property.

In November 2016, Harmony Gold initiated arbitration against Tatsunoko, to which Tatsunoko responded with counterclaims. With the exception of the original visual depictions of 41 characters, which are owned by Big West Advertising not Tatsunoko, the arbitrator found that Harmony Gold had the rights to Super Dimension Fortress Macross, Super Dimension Cavalry Southern Cross, and Genesis Climber MOSPEADA until their expiry on March 14, 2021, as per the licensing agreement. Harmony Gold also holds several trademarks related to Macross and its trademark for the Macross series was renewed on December 26, 2012. The expiration date for these was set to take place ten years from that date, on December 26, 2022.

On April 14, 2018, Harmony Gold's case against Harebrained Schemes was dismissed with prejudice, being in a long line of legal battles that Harmony Gold has withdrawn from, regarding "Mech" imagery, of which they had previously claimed ownership and invention of.

On July 5, 2019, Harmony Gold confirmed that their license with Tatsunoko had been renewed again, extending their ownership of the Macross franchise's co-copyright past the original 2021 expiration date. While a specific number of years was not given for the length of this extension, Harmony Gold chairman Frank Agrama stated that the company will "look forward to the next 35 years of working with Tatsunoko and world class business partners on Robotech."

On April 8, 2021, Harmony Gold and Big West announced that the two companies have reached an agreement which was signed on March 1, 2021, regarding to the Macross and Robotech franchise, officially allowing international distribution on the Macross franchise while also recognizing Harmony Gold's license with Tatsunoko on using characters and mecha from Macross in Robotech globally except Japan and affirming that Big West will not to take any opposition on Harmony Gold's upcoming live action adaptation of Robotech. Both Harmony Gold and Big West will cooperate on future projects for the foreseeable future.

== Titles ==
=== Films ===
- Abe & Bruno (2006)
- American Strays (1996)
- Ball & Chain (2003)
- The Big Goofy Secret of Hidden Pines (2014)
- Crazy Jones (2001)
- Dawn of the Mummy (1981)
- Death to the Supermodels (2004)
- Dirt (2001)
- Faster (2003)
- Going Down (2003)
- The Lost World (1992)
- Return to the Lost World (1993)
- Queen Kong (1976)
- Siblings (2004)
- Welcome to the Neighborhood (2002)

=== Miniseries ===
- Around the World in 80 Days (1989)
- Heidi (1993)
- King of the Olympics (1988)
- The Man Who Lived at the Ritz (1988)
- Shaka Zulu (1986)
- Sherlock Holmes and the Leading Lady (1990)
- Incident at Victoria Falls (1991)

=== Flagship animation ===
- Robotech (1984; an amalgamation of three different anime series from Tatsunoko Productions)
  - The Super Dimension Fortress Macross (1982)
  - Super Dimension Cavalry Southern Cross (1984)
  - Genesis Climber MOSPEADA (1983)
- Codename: Robotech (1984; an extended pilot of the 1985 series)
- Robotech: The Movie (1986)
- Robotech II: The Sentinels (1988)
- Robotech 3000 (2000)
- Robotech: Remastered (2003–2004; remastered and extended version of the 1985 series)
- Robotech: The Shadow Chronicles (2006)

=== Other animation ===
- The Age of Dinosaurs (1983)
- The Brave Frog (1985)
- Captain Future (1987)
- Captain Harlock and the Queen of a Thousand Years (1985; an amalgamation of two different anime series from Toei Animation)
  - Captain Harlock (1978–1982)
  - Queen Millennia (1981–1982)
- Casshan: Robot Hunter (1994)
- Dracula: Sovereign of the Damned (1983)
- Dragon Ball (1989; under license by Toei USA, the first five episodes and a TV special edited from movies 1 and 3)
- Dr. Slump (1984?; the first episode)
- Ferdy the Ant (1984–1985)
- Flower Angel (1986)
- Frankenstein (1983)
- Gatchaman (1994)
- Goldwing (1980)
- Lensman: Power of the Lens (1987)
- Lensman: Secret of the Lens (1988)
- Little Women's Christmas Story (1986)
- Lococomotion (aka Tangoo & Ullashong by KBS/Seoul Movie Company; 2001)
- Magical Princess Gigi (1986; aka Gigi and the Fountain of Youth)
- Once Upon a Time (a.k.a. Windaria; 1986)
- Seven Seas: The Legend of Blue (200?)
- Thumbelina (Sekai Meisaku Douwa: Oyayubi Hime; the 1978 Toei Animation feature film, not the 1992 Enoki Films TV series)
- The World of the Talisman (aka Planetbusters and Birth; 1987)
- The Call of the Wild (Toei Animation, dubbed 1982 Japanese production)
- Timefighters in the Land of Fantasy (1987)
- The Little Train/El Pequeno Tren (Harmony Gold USA dubs English and Spanish 1985; original Italian version 1980)

=== Documentary series and specials ===
- Animals of Africa (1987)
- Faster (2003)
- The Secret Identity of Jack the Ripper (1988)
- Tibet: Cry of the Snow Lion (2004)
- Walking After Midnight (1999)

=== Series ===
- Cobra (1993–1994)
- The Adventures of Rin Tin Tin (1954, remastered 1999)
