= Ferdy the Ant (TV series) =

Liechtensteiner animated television series

- German: Ferdy, die Ameise
- Genre: Adventure
- Based on: Ferda Mravenec by Ondřej Sekora
- Screenplay by: Iva Hercíková; Liane Novotny
- Directed by: Jerry Hampeys; Ralph Newman
- Opening theme: "Ferdy, die Ameise"
- Composers: Evžen Illín; Jiří Strohner
- Country of origin: Liechtenstein
- Original language: German
- No. of episodes: 52

Production
- Running time: 25 minutes
- Production company: European Cinema Production

Original release
- Release: 1984 – 1985

Ferdy the Ant (German: Ferdy, die Ameise), also simply referred to as Ferdy or Ferda, is a children's animated television series based on the Ferda Mravenec series of comic books by Czech author Ondřej Sekora. It was produced by Liechtensteiner company European Cinema Production, and was animated by Far Eastern Productions.

There are three English dubs. The original British English dub, the short-lived Harmony Gold USA dub and a German-produced 2000 dub that were both recorded in Los Angeles, California.

The show is primarily aimed towards children from ages 3 to 10, and has been owned by Entertaining Cartoon Productions and Licensing AG since 2000.

The series also appeared on Nepal Television during the early 2000s. It was one of the few animated shows including Moomin that aired on the Nepal's national television at that time.

== Premise ==
The series revolves around a little boy-ant named Ferdy as he embarks on a variety of adventures in the insect utopia of Käfertal with his close insect friends.

=== Episode format ===
Story-arcs usually last up to seven episodes.

== Main characters ==
- Ferdy
- Bug Butterfingers
- Cricket (Tony in the later dub)
- Arambula
- Grasshopper
- Woody (Bumble in the Harmony Gold dub)
- Gwendolyn (Referred to as Laura in later episodes)
- Bug Sniffy
- Bug Gobbler
- Oskar

== Episodes ==
1. The Daring Rescue
2. The Danger from the Mill
3. The Crazy Snail Trip
4. The Valley of the Horses
5. My Friend the Star
6. On Butterfinger's Trail
7. A Coach for Gwendolyn
8. The Search
9. False Witness
10. The Camp of the Red Ants
11. The Silver Grotto
12. The Ghost Mill
13. The Robbers
14. Dangerous Excursion
15. Playing With Water
16. The New House
17. The Cuckoo's Egg
18. The Spring Festival
19. The Heatwave
20. The Trip to Italy
21. The Ill-Fated Skiing Trip
22. The Flight in a Balloon
23. Butterfinger's Art School
24. On a Treasure Hunt
25. The Forest Fire
26. Homesickness
27. The Mysterious Ship
28. Ferdy in the Ant Hill
29. The Slavedealers
30. The Raid
31. The Battle
32. The Wedding Feast
33. Movie Stars
34. The Unknown Weapon
35. A Nightmare Diet
36. The Honey Knight
37. The Tortise
38. The Dream of the Wild West
39. The Visitor From Space
40. The Beauty Contest
41. The Circus
42. Gwendolyn's Birthday
43. Robin Hood
44. The Ghost Driver
45. The Pizzeria
46. The Owl's Book
47. The Toadstool
48. The Waterskiing Race
49. The Musical
50. The Easter Egg
51. The Snake
52. Hocus-Pocus

== Video game ==
A 3D episodic arcade video game based on the series was developed by Centauri Productions and released by Cenega in 2002 for the PC.

== Home media ==
In 1986, select episodes of the Harmony Gold USA English dub of the series received a small VHS release in the US. The entire series was released on DVD in the Czech Republic in 2003.
