= Captain Harlock and the Queen of a Thousand Years =

American animated television series

- Based on: Space Pirate Captain Harlock and Queen Millennia by Leiji Matsumoto
- Composer: Jack Goga
- Countries of origin: United States; Japan (o.v.)
- No. of seasons: 1
- No. of episodes: 65

Production
- Executive producer: Frank Agrama
- Producers: Carl Macek; Ahmed Agrama
- Running time: 25 minutes per episode
- Production companies: Harmony Gold USA; Toei Animation

Original release
- Network: Syndicated
- Release: September 1 – November 28, 1986

Captain Harlock and the Queen of a Thousand Years is an animated science fiction television series produced by Harmony Gold USA. The series was created by Carl Macek by combining footage from Leiji Matsumoto's Captain Harlock and Queen Millennia anime series.

This is the second time the 1978 Captain Harlock series was treated for English language distribution. The first attempt was in 1981 with the lesser known ZIV International, who only released two volumes of two episodes each, the first (episodes 1 and 9) a relatively faithful adaptation, the second (episodes 2 and 3) retooling the approach to a more farcical one. This attempt is often confused with the Harmony Gold production, but the two productions are not related.

The plot of Macek's creation is extremely different to the plots of Matsumoto's original works.

== Plot ==
Captain Harlock and the Queen of a Thousand Years takes place in an undisclosed point in the future (the only reference to its date being a single reference to "the eruption of Krakatoa 700 years ago", placing its approximate date at 2583), after mankind has colonized the distant stars, but prosperity has corrupted the people of Earth, who have become corrupt and decadent.

The Mazone, a race of sentient plants, hatch a plot to seize Earth after their own planet is destroyed. A lone scientist attempts to warn the people of Earth, but at the cost of his reputation and life. The titular Harlock is blamed for the various instances of the Mazones' attacks upon the Earth, and, despite being an outcast amongst his own people, plans to stop the Mazone and save humanity from the alien threat with aid from Princess Olivia, next in line to throne of Millennia, the Mazones' supposed allies in the invasion.

== Production ==
After the success of Robotech, Harmony Gold sought to expand their syndicated television production in other animation series originating in Japan. The account according to Carl Macek, producer of Robotech, was that he was subsequently asked what other Japanese animated series he was interested in dubbing, and he expressed an interest in Leiji Matsumoto's Captain Harlock.

After the rights were obtained, Macek was informed that Harmony Gold had allocated airtime for 65 episodes. Captain Harlock, however, was only 42 episodes long, prompting Harmony Gold to buy another Matsumoto series, Queen Millennia, when they were unable to get another Captain Harlock series to extend the run. It then fell to Macek and his team to combine the two shows into one series.

Unlike Robotech, it was decided to combine the two series simultaneously instead of simply running them one after the other with some "connecting" episodes. At the same time, it was also decided to change the timing of episodes, thus creating a situation where clips from episodes at various points in the original series would appear in a single episode in the American series. This resulted in a wildly different plot from both of the original sources. The Queen Millennia television series also ran 42 episodes, with the result that many episodes were dropped from both series (including the final episodes of the Millennia series, which therefore ended in a cliffhanger) in order to create the 65 American episodes. Additionally, despite the title of the series, the two title characters never appeared together on-screen as the original shows took place in different continuities.

== Distribution ==
Unlike with Robotech, Harmony Gold was unable to secure a national syndication deal for the series. As such, the series only aired in a handful of markets during the 1986–1987 television season. After the initial airing, the series was pulled from syndication and Harmony Gold ultimately allowed their license for both shows that made up the series to lapse. No home video releases were produced for the series, causing the series to be unavailable for viewing to the general public.

Prior to 2025, the series existed as the only attempt at an official release for the Queen Millennia TV series in the United States, but a restored, subtitled high-definition Blu-ray Disc collection of Millennia was released in September 2025 by Sentai Filmworks.

== Episode list ==
1. Genesis
2. The Inferno
3. Mystery of the Observatory
4. Simple Diversions
5. Origins
6. Deadly Games
7. Firefight
8. Clash of Will
9. The Knockout Punch
10. The Hidden Land
11. Life Sentence
12. Zero Hour
13. Revelations
14. Boot Camp
15. Battle Stations
16. Survival Time
17. Undersea Encounter
18. Desert Sands
19. Healing Ways
20. The Abduction
21. World for Ransom
22. Journey Into Darkness
23. Hot Seat
24. Knights Without Honor
25. Firing Line
26. Royal Treatment
27. Lone Justice
28. Passion Play
29. Cat and Mouse
30. The Last Laugh
31. The Raiding Party
32. The Dark Dimensions
33. Fire and Brimstone
34. The White Ship
35. Command Performance
36. Glory Days
37. The Price of Failure
38. The Days of My Youth
39. Chain Gang
40. The Master Builder
41. Return Engagement
42. To Catch a Captain
43. Double Jeopardy
44. Danger Below
45. The Deadly Duel
46. Lightning Strikes Twice
47. Queen's Gambit
48. Mutual Destruction
49. The Shocking Truth
50. The Set Up
51. The Sound of Laughter
52. Treason Is in the Eye of the Beholder
53. Date With Destiny
54. Balance of Power
55. The Gauntlet
56. Ray of Hope
57. Phoenix Rising
58. Manifest Destiny
59. Friend or Foe
60. Walking Wounded
61. White Water
62. Coast Guard
63. Vengeance
64. Anchors Away
65. A New Beginning
