= Queen Millennia =

Japanese manga series

- Cover of first manga volume, with spines from remaining four volumes (Sankei editions)

新竹取物語 1000年女王 (Shin Taketori Monogatari: Sennen Joō)
- Genre: Adventure, science fiction
- Manga
- Written by: Leiji Matsumoto
- Published by: Sankei Shimbun; Nishinippon Shimbun
- Magazine: Sankei Shimbun; Nishinippon Sports
- Original run: 28 January 1980 – 11 May 1983
- Volumes: 5
- Light novel
- Written by: Kaeko Iguchi; Leiji Matsumoto
- Illustrated by: Leiji Matsumoto
- Published by: Sankei Shuppan
- Imprint: Junior Shōsetsu
- Original run: December 1980 – August 1981
- Volumes: 2
- Light novel
- Written by: Keisuke Fujikawa
- Illustrated by: Leiji Matsumoto
- Published by: Shueisha
- Imprint: Cobalt
- Original run: January 1981 – March 1982
- Volumes: 3 + 1 film novel
- Light novel
- Written by: Ken Wakasaki
- Illustrated by: Leiji Matsumoto
- Published by: Bunka Publishing Bureau
- Imprint: Cobalt
- Original run: June 1981 – March 1982
- Volumes: 3
- Anime television series
- Directed by: Nobutaka Nishizawa
- Written by: Keisuke Fujikawa; Shigemitsu Taguchi; Hiroyasu Yamaura; Toyohiro Andō
- Music by: Ryudo Uzaki; Tomoyuki Asakawa
- Studio: Toei Animation
- Licensed by: NA: Sentai Filmworks (home video)
- Original network: FNS (Fuji TV)
- English network: US: Syndication
- Original run: 16 April 1981 – 25 March 1982
- Episodes: 42
- Anime film
- Directed by: Masayuki Akehi
- Produced by: Kenji Yokoyama
- Written by: Keisuke Fujikawa
- Music by: Kitarō
- Studio: Toei Animation
- Released: 13 March 1982
- Runtime: 121 minutes

Queen Millennia (Japanese: 新竹取物語 1000年女王, Hepburn: Shin Taketori Monogatari: Sennen Joō; lit. 'The New Tale of the Bamboo Cutter: Millennium Queen') is a Japanese manga series written and illustrated by Leiji Matsumoto which was serialized from 28 January 1980 through 11 May 1983 in both the Sankei Shimbun and Nishinippon Sports newspapers. The manga series was adapted into a 42-episode anime television series by Toei Animation and broadcast on Fuji Television and its affiliates from 16 April 1981 through 25 March 1982. An anime film was released on 13 March 1982 shortly before the TV series ended.

The anime series was combined by Harmony Gold and Carl Macek with episodes from the 1978 Matsumoto series, Space Pirate Captain Harlock, and shown from 1985 to 1986 in the United States as the 65-episode Captain Harlock and the Queen of a Thousand Years. The series was broadcast in Germany on Tele 5 during 1992, on New Channel in Greece in 1997 and on Mangas in France in 2004.

== Plot ==
The series takes place in the (then) futuristic year 1999. Professor Amamori discovers a 10th planet in the Earth's solar system, which he names La-Metal, while at his observatory in Tokyo. Its diameter is 9 times that of Earth. Amamori notes the planet has a highly eccentric orbit and, as it emerges behind the distant Pluto, Amamori realizes that La-Metal is on a collision course with Earth. He calculates that the planet will impact Earth on 9 September 1999, at 9 o'clock, 9 minutes and 9 seconds.

It turns out that La-Metal orbits the Solar System every 1,000 years, but only this time it is fated to come dangerously close to Earth. While damage to the giant ice-covered La-Metal would be minimal, Earth would be destroyed by the planet's massive gravitational pull. La-Metal is inhabited by a subterranean humanoid species ruled by a mysterious Holy Queen, Larela. She plans to abduct a large number of humans before the destruction of Earth, and enslave them with the help of her operatives already on Earth. These operatives are led by Andromeda Promethium, a woman known as a Millennial Queen who goes by the Earth name, Yukino Yayoi. She has been living on Earth for almost 1,000 years, like many such Millennial Queens before her, with the intention of establishing a colony for her home planet.

Promethium, who comes to care for her Earthling foster parents and friends, begins to question the La-Metalians' plans. As Yayoi, she begins working for Professor Amamori and decides to offer her help when Amamori discovers that La-Metal is heading for Earth. The professor's young nephew Hajime, whose parents are killed while designing a spaceship to help a small group of humans escape from Earth, also joins their fight to save the planet.

They are soon confronted by a sabotage campaign initiated by a group of La-Metal generals against Earth. As the two planets come closer to colliding, Yukino finds out that a black hole is to blame for La-Metal's orbital deviation. A desperate plan is undertaken to destroy the black hole and save both their worlds.

== Characters ==
Yayoi Yukino (雪野 弥生, Yukino Yayoi)
La Andromeda Promethium (ラー・アンドロメダ・プロメシューム, Rā Andoromeda Puromeshiyūmu)
Voiced by: Keiko Han
Every 1000 years, a woman called a Millennial Queen is sent from the planet La-Metal to secretly rule over the Earth and lead an underground organization that secretly controls the entire planet. Promethium, known to Earthlings as Yukino Yayoi, is the current Millennial Queen. Some early promotional material identified her as Promethium II, and indicated that she was the daughter of the Queen Promethium of the Machine Empire of Galaxy Express 999 (another of Matsumoto's works). This idea (and the suffix, II) was later dropped, however, and Millennial Queen Promethium / Yukino Yayoi was considered to be the person who would eventually become the Machine Queen (as seen in Maetel Legend).
While shown with rounder eyes in the anime television series, she is shown with almond-shaped eyes in both the manga and the anime film and looks just like Maetel from Galaxy Express 999.
While Yayoi is Professor Amamori's private secretary in all three versions of the story, there are the following differences:
- In the anime television series and manga, Yayoi lives on the second floor of a ramen shop run by an older couple who have adopted her as their daughter. She has a tiger-striped cat.
- In the anime film, in addition to being Professor Amamori's private secretary, she also teaches at a school and lives in a high-class apartment.
Hajime Amamori (雨森 始, Amamori Hajime)
Voiced by: Keiko Toda
Hajime is the main character in the manga and is in junior high school. He looks just like the character Tetsurō Hoshino from Galaxy Express 999, only wearing a gakuran. He has a keen interest in space, and is somewhat infatuated with Yayoi. While he doesn't get good grades in school, he is a very honest and kind person. At first he wants revenge on the people who are responsible for his parents' deaths, but he decides it is fruitless to hold a grudge and abandons that plan.
There are a few differences between the various versions of the story:
- In the anime film, he is introduced as a student of Yayoi. In order to protect the Earth from La-Metal's troops, he uses a Zero from a museum.
- In the anime television series, he tries to act as a peacemaker between La-Metal and the people of Earth, and tries to work out a compromise between them. In the end, he tries to help people escape from the approaching La-Metal by using a helicopter.
- In the manga, he receives a cybernetic implant which increases his intelligence and allows him to fly space ships extremely well.
Professor Amamori (雨森教授, Amamori-kyōju)
Voiced by: Ichirō Nagai
Professor Amamori is the head scientist at the Tsukuba Observatory. He is Hajime's uncle, though Hajime's father is his younger brother in the TV series and his older brother in the film. He became Hajime's guardian after his parents were both killed in an explosion. Amamori discovered the 10th planet, La-Metal, and determined it would collide with the Earth. At first, he had plenty of hair, but the discovery caused him to begin losing hair (though in the TV series, he keeps all his hair).
Holy Queen Larela (ラーレラ, Rārera)
Larela is the Holy Queen and absolute ruler of planet La-Metal. She appears in the film as a small girl with glowing body and eyes, and energy halos at her head and feet. She is cold-hearted, and it is her plan to allow Earth to be destroyed when her planet passes it for its final time.

== Media ==
=== Manga ===
The manga was originally serialized in from 28 January 1980 through 11 May 1983 in both the Sankei Shimbun and Nishinippon Sports newspapers. There have been multiple releases in book form. A planned ten volume B5-sized gekigaban set released under Sankei Shuppan's "Wakuwaku Comics" label had the first 10 pages of each volume in color, and an appendix with cel images from the TV series and interviews with Matsumoto and the creators of the TV series. The series was only published through volume 5, however.

- Volume 1, 203 pages, August 1981
- Volume 2
- Volume 3, 205 pages, April 1982
- Volume 4
- Volume 5, 205 pages, November 1982

A shinsōban series of five volumes was released by Sankei Shuppan. Each volume had approximately 200 pages. Shogakukan released the series in both B6-sized hardcover and bunkoban formats under the shorter Queen Millennia (1000年女王, Sennen no Joō) title. They also released the series in two volumes under their "My First Wideban" label, marketed to convenience stores.

Shogakukan bunkoban reprints:

- Volume 1, 346 pages, ISBN 4-09-197261-6, June 1991
- Volume 2, 340 pages, ISBN 4-09-197262-4, August 1991
- Volume 3, 330 pages, ISBN 4-09-197263-2, August 1991

=== Novels ===
A two volume novelization by Kaeko Iguchi and Leiji Matsumoto was released by Sankei Shuppan under their "Junior Shōsetsu" label:

- The Metal Bouquet (ラーメタルの花束, Rā Metaru no Hanataba), 181 pages, December 1980
- The Black Hole (ラー・暗黒太陽, Rā Ankoku Taiyō), 180 pages, August 1981

Light novel adaptations were written by Keisuke Fujikawa, who also wrote many of the teleplays for the anime television series as well as the screenplay for the anime film adaptation. A film adaptation was also written. They were published by Shueisha under their Cobalt label:

- Volume 1, 241 pages, ISBN 4-08-610429-6, January 1981
- Volume 2, 239 pages, August 1981
- Volume 3, 233 pages, March 1982
- Film version, 1982

Bunka Publishing Bureau published a three volume "Pocket Mates" light novel series by Ken Wakasaki:

- Volume 1, 315 pages, June 1981
- Volume 2, 256 pages, September 1981
- Volume 3, 290 pages, March 1982

=== Film comics ===
Film comics based on the anime television series were released by Sankei Shuppan under their "Wakuwaku" label:

- Volume 1, 156 pages, 15 June 1981
- Volume 2, 156 pages, 15 July 1981
- Volume 3, 156 pages, 15 August 1981
- Volume 4, 156 pages, 15 September 1981
- Volume 5, 156 pages, 25 October 1981
- Volume 6, 156 pages, 15 November 1981
- Volume 7, 156 pages, 1 January 1982
- Volume 8, 156 pages, 15 February 1982

=== Anime television series ===
The Queen Millennia anime television series aired on the Fuji TV network from 16 April 1981 through 25 March 1982 in the 7:00 pm to 7:30 pm time slot. It replaced Galaxy Express 999 in that time slot, and was replaced by Patalliro! at the end of its run. The series was animated by Toei Dōga. The series was originally scheduled to have 52 episodes, but due to having lower ratings than the previous Galaxy Express 999, the series ended after 42 episodes.

The series will be released on Blu-ray Disc in North America by Sentai Filmworks on September 2, 2025.

==== Staff ====
- Planning: Tokio Tsuchiya, Kenji Yokoyama, Yoichi Kominato
- Production supervisor: Masahisa Saeki
- Teleplay writers: Keisuke Fujikawa, Shigemitsu Taguchi, Hiroyasu Yamaura, Toyohiro Andō
- Chief director: Nobutaka Nishizawa
- General animation director / character designer: Yoshinori Kanemori
- Mechanical designer: Katsumi Itabashi
- Chief designer (art direction): Isamu Tsuchida
- Music: Ryudō Uzaki, Tomoyuki Asakawa
- Production: Fuji TV, Toei Animation

==== Music ====
Queen Millennia had music composed and arranged by Ryōdō Uzaki and Tomoyuki Asakawa. The opening theme song, Cosmos Dream (コスモス・ドリーム, Kosumosu Dorīmu), was sung by Masaki Takanashi. The ending theme song, Excellent Legend (まほろば伝説, Mahoroba Densetsu), was sung by Manami Ishikawa. Both songs had lyrics by Yoko Aki, were composed by Ryudo Uzaki, and were arranged by Motoki Funayama.

Ishikawa was selected from 1,898 applicants to work with Takanashi on the image song Love Is Flying on Wings (愛は翼に乗って, Ai wa Tsubasa ni Notte). The song was performed by the Queen Millennia Grand Orchestra and arranged by Nozomi Aoki. A second image song, Message from Space (星空のメッセージ, Hoshizora no Messēji), was sung by Keiko Han and Slapstick, and was arranged by Motoki Funayama. The lyrics for both image songs were written by Yōko Aki and composed by Ryudō Uzaki.

=== Animated film ===
The 1982 film serves as a retelling of the anime series. The 1999 setting is designed as more futuristic in appearance than in the TV series. In addition, the film provides an alternate ending to the story leaving no room for the events of the Maetel Legend OVA. The music score for the film was written and performed by Kitaro, while the end-credits music was sung by American singer Dara Sedaka.

=== Maetel Legend ===
The 2001 OVA Maetel Legend serves as a prelude to Galaxy Express 999. It is clearly established that Maetel is the daughter of Yayoi and that Yayoi becomes the Queen Promethium of the Mechanized Empire.
