= Dawn of the Mummy =

1981 American horror film by Frank Agrama

- Theatrical release poster
- Directed by: Frank Agrama
- Written by: Frank Agrama; Ronald Dobrin; Daria Price
- Produced by: Frank Agrama
- Starring: Brenda King; Barry Sattels; George Peck; John Salvo; Ibrahim Khan; Joan Levy; Ellen Faison; Dianne Beatty
- Cinematography: Larry Revene; Sergio Rubini
- Edited by: Jonathon Braun
- Music by: Shuki Levy
- Distributed by: Harmony Gold USA; Goldfrab Distribution
- Release date: December 11, 1981
- Running time: 93 minutes
- Country: United States
- Language: English
- Budget: $500,000

Dawn of the Mummy is a 1981 American horror film directed by Frank Agrama, who also served as writer and producer on the film. While not prosecuted for obscenity, the film was seized and confiscated in the UK under Section 3 of the Obscene Publications Act 1959 during the video nasty panic.

== Plot ==
In Egypt during the fourth millennium BC, slave raiders abduct villagers to be servants for Pharaoh Sefirama's burial. While standing around Sefirama's sarcophagus, they are killed with poison gas, and the entrance to his tomb is sealed.

Thousands of years later, three men, Rick, Tariq, and Karib, uncover its entrance. The burial's high priestess, now an elderly woman, says that the tomb is cursed, but is scared off when Rick shoots his pistol at the air. Rick tells Tariq and Karib to guard the tomb for the night and drives away in his Jeep.

That evening, three grave robbers arrive and are greeted by the priestess, who tells them to close the tomb to prevent its curse. They enter the tomb but get infected by its gases. One robber dies, while the other two escape.

Meanwhile, American models travel to Egypt for a fashion shoot. En route to the tomb, one of their tires gets punctured, and they stop to replace it. Model Lisa asks the director, Gary, to look at a dune. There, Lisa falls and finds one of the robbers' severed heads. The rest of their group takes them back to their location.

Rick and his group return to the tomb and explore its burial chamber. Rick attempts to chisel a passage into the chamber, but Tarak and Karib detonate its entrance with dynamite and open Sefirama's sarcophagus to look for more treasures.

The next morning, the models' group shoots photos near the tomb. Karib shoots his gun at them, thinking that they are intruders, but Rick and Tariq stop him. The models' group proceeds to the tomb against Rick and his henchmen's objections. While doing so, their hot lights accidentally revive Sefirama. Rick snaps off the cable on one of their spotlights. Model Jenny is asked to go and find a battery for their spotlights, but spills a bowl containing one of Sefirama's organs, infecting her hand. Sefirama's followers come back to life.

Tariq is left to return to his home, while Jenny's infection burns her. Karib enters the tomb alone, cuts open Sefirama's mummy, and steals his crook and flail. A door to another chamber opens. Karib enters but is incapacitated by the door and dragged away. The following day, Rick and Tariq enter the tomb while searching for Karib and find Sefirama's crook, flail, and other treasures.

At a campfire that night, the models find the two robbers's corpses. Their heads are crushed. Meanwhile, the priestess enters the tomb, and the mummy kills her.

The next day, a model gets lost in the tomb. Meanwhile, Gary and Ahmed go to town for a rest. Local Omar gives Jenny and Gary a "smoke." Jenny sees the mummy and runs to Gary. However, the mummy is gone when he looks.

At the tomb, the mummy decapitates one of the tomb raiders. Models Lisa and Melinda take a swim at the nearby oasis. Melinda leaves to take a walk and runs into the mummy and one of his "soldiers." They kill Melinda by biting and tearing out her throat.

The next day, Rick finds Tariq dead, enters the tomb and calls for the God of the Sun. A wall slides back, and Rick finds the treasure. The mummy returns and kills Rick. Bill and Gary go to town to see Omar, who is celebrating his wedding.

Meanwhile, Lisa looks around the tomb. Bill finds the gold there and calls out. Rick's severed head falls from the ceiling and lands in Bill's arms. He returns to the camp, running from the mummy's "soldiers." Bill shoots the mummy, to no avail. The mummy decapitates Bill. Jenny gets eaten alive by the "soldiers" while Lisa and model June flee in a jeep.

At Omar's wedding celebration, the "soldiers" eat the bride. Everyone runs, but the soldiers kill many in the street. Lisa and June arrive and throw dynamite at the mummy with little effect. Aided by Omar, the models spread gasoline, light a fuse in a box of dynamite and blow up a shed with the mummy in it. Gary arrives, and walks away with Lisa, June, and Omar. The mummy's hand later rises from the rubble.

== Cast ==
- Brenda King as Lisa
- Barry Sattels as Bill
- George Peck as Rick
- John Salvo as Gary
- Joan Levy as Jenny
- Ellen Faison as Melinda
- Dianne Beatty as Joan
- Ali Gohar as Tariq
- Ahmed Rateb as Karib
- Bahar Saied
- Ali Azab
- Ahamed Labab as Ahamed
- Laila Nasr as High Priestess/Old Hag
- Kandarp Raval as The servant boy (Mummy)

== Production ==
Dawn of the Mummy was filmed in Egypt with a mostly Italian crew leading many to mistake it as an Italian film.

Unlike traditional interpretations of mummies in cinema, the film's portrayal of the undead is quite uncommon. In the film, the mummies are portrayed as ravenous flesh-eaters, similar to the popular portrayal of zombies in which both share many similarities.

Due to the film's surprisingly graphic content, the film was originally subject to several cuts in the UK in order to trim down the film's more graphic scenes; approximately 1 minute and 43 seconds were cut from 12 different scenes in the film. Some scenes included The Mummy ramming a machete into the character Tarak's head, a man being gutted by the mummy, and scenes where the mummy's undead servants feast on several characters. The cuts were waived for the 2003 Anchor Bay DVD.

== Release ==
=== Home media ===
Dawn of the Mummy has been released in VHS and DVD format. The film was released in region 1 by Madacy Entertainment, as a VHS transfer. It features an audio commentary track by director Frank Agrama.

The film was released uncut in the UK by Anchor Bay Entertainment. It features an anamorphic widescreen 1.77:1 transfer, plus the 4:3 full-screen transfer, DTS Digital Surround, Dolby Digital 2.0 & 5.1 Surround. The extras include Director's Audio Commentary, Stills Gallery, Production Notes, and Trailer.

== Reception ==
The film has received mixed to negative reviews from critics.

John Stanley awarded the film 2 / 4 stars stating, "Hashish smokers in a Cairo square are as exciting as it gets in this tale". Popcorn Pictures.com gave the film 6/10 stating, "It is an arduous struggle to get past the first half of Dawn of the Mummy but stick with it and you'll be rewarded with one of the more entertaining zombie flicks of its period: a guilty pleasure of trashy exploitation at its finest. If the entire film had been as enjoyable as the last half, you'd be looking at a bonafide classic right here".

It was awarded a score of 0 / 4 by VideoHound's Golden Movie Retriever which panned the film's plot and acting.
