= Crazy Jones =

- Directed by: Joe Aaron
- Written by: Joe Aaron
- Produced by: Joe Aaron; Keith Coene
- Starring: Joe Aaron; Francesca Catalano; Elizabeth Ince
- Cinematography: Brian J. Reynolds
- Edited by: Margaret Guinee; Wilt Henderson
- Music by: Jeff Beal
- Distributed by: Harmony Gold USA
- Release date: March 1, 2002 (SBIFF)
- Running time: 94 minutes
- Country: United States
- Language: English

Crazy Jones is a 2002 American comedy-drama film written, produced, and directed by Joe Aaron (in his directorial debut), who also stars with Francesca Catalano.

== Synopsis ==
Finnegan Jones, a suicidal grave-tender suffering from Tourette's syndrome, lives with his overprotective mother and preparing to turn 40. Convinced he'll need a caretaker after she's gone, Jones' mother sets about seeking a prospective spouse. Her candidate—a bubbly, corpulent neighbor whose insensitivity to Finnegan's condition only aggravates the malady—couldn't be worse. Instead, he's begun to bond with a quirky, precocious 12-year-old named Syd, whose refusal to pass judgment allows Finnegan to find his own voice. The friendship never advances beyond the purely platonic, though Syd is a remarkably assured and fitting counterpart Finnegan.

== Cast ==
- Joe Aaron as Finnegan Jones
- Francesca Catalano as Syd
- Elizabeth Ince as Finn's Mom
- Tess Borden as Mandy
- Oto Brezina as Dr. Amp
- Jim O’Donoghue as Pastor McEwen
- Camilla Granasen as Isabel
- Adam O’Neal as Scooter Boy

== Reception ==
Santa Maria Times:

"Joe Aaron's new film, Crazy Jones, will undoubtedly be one of the high points of this year's Santa Barbara International Film Festival. Despite dark undertones, Jones emerges as an uplifting tale of rebirth and redemption, with some wonderful acting at its core...Aaron's modern-day fable mixes tragedy in with absurd humor to great effect...Aaron is a talent worthy of notice, and one that we will hopefully be seeing much more of in the future." -Ken Miller

The Hollywood Reporter:

Aaron and Catalano "make an impressive feature debut...[with] oddball charm and lively performances to match[,] the low-budget picture might scare away distributors looking for a safe bet, but it should still serve as a conspicuous calling card for its multifaceted creator." -Michael Rechtshaffen

Boxoffice Magazine:

"lead/director/screenwriter/producer Joe Aaron has made a passionately felt picture in which his multi-hyphenate involvement does not dissipate the results but deepens them...Aaron's great achievement here in this sparely produced tale, which had its world premiere at the Santa Barbara fest, is that "Crazy Jones" never takes on a movie-of-the-week feel; it's nothing so glossy, and nothing of that ilk...Aaron has crafted an internally consistent story whose conclusion almost gives "Crazy Jones" its own special spirituality." -Kim Williamson

Variety:

"[This] Generally pleasing item could turn up on cable or in niche venues, and regardless will serve as a proud calling card for helmer-scribe Joe Aaron...[who] demonstrates an eye for composition and framing that well exceeds that of most first-time filmmakers." - Lowenstein

== Awards ==
- Winner of Cinequest Best Feature Audience Choice Award in 2003.
- Winner of Best Feature Berkeley Film Festival in 2002.
- Award-winner Dances With Films Festival (Los Angeles).
- Award-winner Ft. Myers Film Festival in 2002.
- Official Entry of the Santa Barbara International Film Festival in 2002.
