= Frank Agrama =

American film director, producer and writer (1930–2023)

- Born: Farouk Agama; January 1, 1930; Arish, Egypt
- Died: April 25, 2023 (aged 93)
- Education: UCLA
- Occupations: Film director, producer, actor
- Spouse: Olfat El Sergany
- Children: 2

Farouk "Frank" Agrama (Arabic: فرنك عجرمة; January 1, 1930 – April 25, 2023) was an Egyptian-born American film director and producer, writer and businessman. He was the founder and chief executive officer (CEO) of Harmony Gold USA, Inc.

== Career ==
In the 1970s and early 1980s, Agrama made a number of low-budget films which included The Godfather's Friend, Queen Kong and Dawn of the Mummy. He also began selling broadcast rights from Paramount Pictures, which he then sold to his friend, former Italian Prime Minister Silvio Berlusconi, to the latter's Mediaset broadcasting and multimedia company.

In 1983, he secured a deal with the South African Broadcasting Corporation ("SABC") to distribute the controversial miniseries Shaka Zulu. In the same year, he founded "Harmony Gold USA, Inc.". Despite Shaka Zulu's massive success worldwide, Agrama's skillful negotiations left SABC to actually lose money, while Harmony Gold kept most of the profit. Harmony Gold would eventually be known for producing films such as Robotech: The Shadow Chronicles, other Robotech animated works and the 1993 miniseries Heidi.

According to the Los Angeles Times, prosecutors of Milan, on November 21, 2006, charged Agrama, along with former Italian Prime Minister Silvio Berlusconi and ten others, in a trial over tax fraud, embezzlement and false accounting to Mediaset. In fact, on October 26, 2012, Agrama was convicted after this lengthy trial, where Berlusconi, or his group, had allegedly bought USA film rights by him to the Mediaset media company at inflated prices. As his age was over 70 years, he was exempted from direct imprisonment and served no actual jail time.

In 2013, Agrama and several others, including Mediaset Vice President Pier Silvio Berlusconi, son of Silvio, and the Hong Kong–based Wiltshire Group of Companies were under trial for tax evasion and embezzlement with the broadcasting rights firm, Mediatrade. In 2014, all parties were acquitted in the first instance due to expiring statute of limitations. A new appeals hearing took place on January 20, 2016. All charges against Agrama and five others were dropped, while Mediaset CEO Pier Silvio Berlusconi and President Fedele Confalonieri were sentenced to 14 months imprisonment.

== Death ==
Agrama died on April 25, 2023, at the age of 93.

== Legal problems ==
=== Tax-fraud conviction in Mediaset trial (1988–1998) ===
The Mediaset trial was launched in April 2005, with indictment of 14 persons (including Silvio Berlusconi and Agrama) for having committed: (A) false accounting and embezzlement in order to mask payments of substantial "black funds", committed in 1988 to 1994. (B) tax fraud equal in total to more than €62 million (120bn lira), committed in 1988 to 1998.

Both indictments were related to achievement of personal tax evasion, through illicit trade of movie rights between Mediaset and secret fictive foreign companies situated in tax haven nations, causing fictive losses for Mediaset, with the trade gains being accumulated by the foreign companies owned (in this case, Harmony Gold) by the indicted tax fraudsters, who ultimately had the gains paid out as personal profit without paying tax in Italy.

On October 26, 2012, Agrama was sentenced to three years prison time by an Italian court for tax evasion. The charges were in relation to a scheme to purchase overseas film rights at inflated prices through offshore companies. The three-year term was never served in accord with a 2006 amnesty law intended to reduce prison overcrowding. Agrama and his co-defendants were also ordered to pay a 10 million euro fine.

=== Acquittal in Mediatrade trial ===
In October 2011, Paddy Chan Mei-yiu and Katherine Hsu May-chun, along with nine others (including Frank Agrama and Pier Silvio Berlusconi, son of Silvio Berlusconi), were indicted by Milan court and charged with buying rights for US television series and movies, then reselling them to broadcasting rights firm Mediatrade (a subsidiary of Mediaset) at inflated prices and laundering the money in a complex scheme. The four companies allegedly involved in this scheme were Wiltshire Trading, Harmony Gold, CS Secretaries and Loong Po Management.

According to prosecutors, Chan met Agrama in Cannes, France, in the late 1970s at a trade fair and they decided to form a partnership to trade movie rights internationally. Chan set up a Hong Kong-based Harmony Gold Limited in 1979, records from the city's Companies Registry show. In the same year, Agrama set up Agrama Film Enterprises on Sunset Boulevard in Los Angeles. Four years later, he set up Harmony Gold USA. He later also became the Los Angeles representative of another Hong Kong company established by Chan, Wiltshire Trading. Prosecutors estimated the illicit profits between 1988 and 1999 amounted to US$170 million. Earlier in 2005, Swiss investigators froze 150 million francs (HK$1.29 billion) at a UBS branch in Lugano belonging to Harmony Gold, Wiltshire Trading and other companies.

On July 24, 2014, Variety reported that some of the charges have been dropped due to expiring statute of limitations. An appeals hearing was set to take place January 20, 2016.

On March 18, 2016, The Hollywood Reporter reported that at the January 20, 2016, appeal Frank Agrama was confirmed acquitted. Five other people, including Paddy Chan Mei-yiu and Katherine Hsu May-chun, were confirmed acquitted. Mediaset CEO Silvio Berlusconi and Chairman Fedele Confalonieri were sentenced and received the same 14-month sentence.

== Production credits ==
=== Actor ===
- The Circus (1949)
- Wa’d (1954)
- Hob Fi Hob (1960)

=== Director ===
- Eroe Di Sabia (1970) writer/director
- The Godfather's Friend (1972) writer/director
- Queen Kong (1976)
- Dawn of the Mummy (1981)

=== Producer ===
- Robotech The Movie (1986) Executive Producer
- The World of the Talisman (1987) (a.k.a. Planet Busters, Birth)
- Robotech II: The Sentinels (1987) Producer
- Lensman: Power of the Lens (1987) Executive producer
- Lensman: Secret of the Lens (1988) Executive producer
- Around the World in 80 Days (1989) Producer
- Dragon Ball (1989) Executive Producer
- Sherlock Holmes and the Leading Lady (1992) Producer
- The Lost World (1992) Producer
- Heidi (1993) Producer
- The Return to the Lost World (1994) Producer
- American Strays (1996) Executive Producer
- Road Ends (1997) Producer
- Robotech: Battlecry (2002) (Video Game) Executive producer
- Robotech: The Shadow Chronicles (2006) Executive producer
- Robotech: Love Live Alive (2013) Executive producer

=== Writer ===
- Dawn of the Mummy (1981) Writer
- Robotech: The Shadow Chronicles (2006) Screenplay
