= Barbara Berlusconi =

Swiss-born Italian business executive

- Born: 30 July 1984 (age 42); Arlesheim, Basel-Landschaft, Switzerland
- Citizenship: Switzerland; Italy
- Education: San Raffaele University
- Occupation: Advisory board of Fininvest
- Board member of: A.C. Milan (vice-chairman and CEO, 2011–2013)
- Partner(s): Giorgio Valaguzza; Lorenzo Guerrieri
- Children: 5
- Parents: Silvio Berlusconi (father); Veronica Lario (mother)
- Relatives: Marina Berlusconi (half-sister); Pier Silvio Berlusconi (half-brother); Paolo Berlusconi (uncle)
- Family: Berlusconi family
- Website: Barbara Berlusconi – Fininvest.it

Barbara Berlusconi (born 30 July 1984) is an Italian business executive. She is advisor to the board of Fininvest and previously sat on the board of directors of A.C. Milan as vice-chairman and CEO.

== Early life ==
Barbara Berlusconi was born in Arlesheim, Basel-Landschaft canton, Switzerland in the summer of 1984, and is the daughter of Silvio Berlusconi and Veronica Lario (who became his second wife, in 1990). Barbara Berlusconi's godfather was Bettino Craxi. She made her formal debut in Paris at the Bal des débutantes in 2001. She has two older half-siblings, Maria Elvira "Marina" (born in 1966) and Pier Silvio (born in 1969), from her father's first marriage. She also has two younger siblings, Eleonora (born in 1986) and Luigi (born in 1988).

=== Education ===
Berlusconi completed her primary education at the Steiner school of Milan, in Città Studi. Berlusconi then attended secondary school at Collegio Villoresi San Giuseppe of Monza in Italy, and in July 2010, At 26 years old, Berlusconi obtained her bachelor in Philosophy, and gained a first class degree, with 110/110 cum laude, at the Vita-Salute San Raffaele University, founded and run by Don Verzé until 2011.

== Fininvest SpA ==
Since September 2003, Berlusconi has been member of the board of directors of Fininvest SpA.

== A.C. Milan ==
In April 2011, Berlusconi was given a role on the board of directors at A.C. Milan and since 30 November 2013 one of the CEO of the club.

== Personal life ==
=== Family ===
She has two sons, Alessandro (born in 2007) and Edoardo (born in 2009), with former partner Giorgio Valaguzza. Berlusconi resides in Milan. She was previously in a relationship with Alexandre Pato from 2011 to 2013. She has three other sons, Leone (born in 2016), Francesco Amos (born in 2018) and Ettore Quinto (born in 2021), with her current partner Lorenzo Guerrieri.

== See also ==
- Adriano Galliani
