= Ferda Mravenec =

Czech literary and comics character

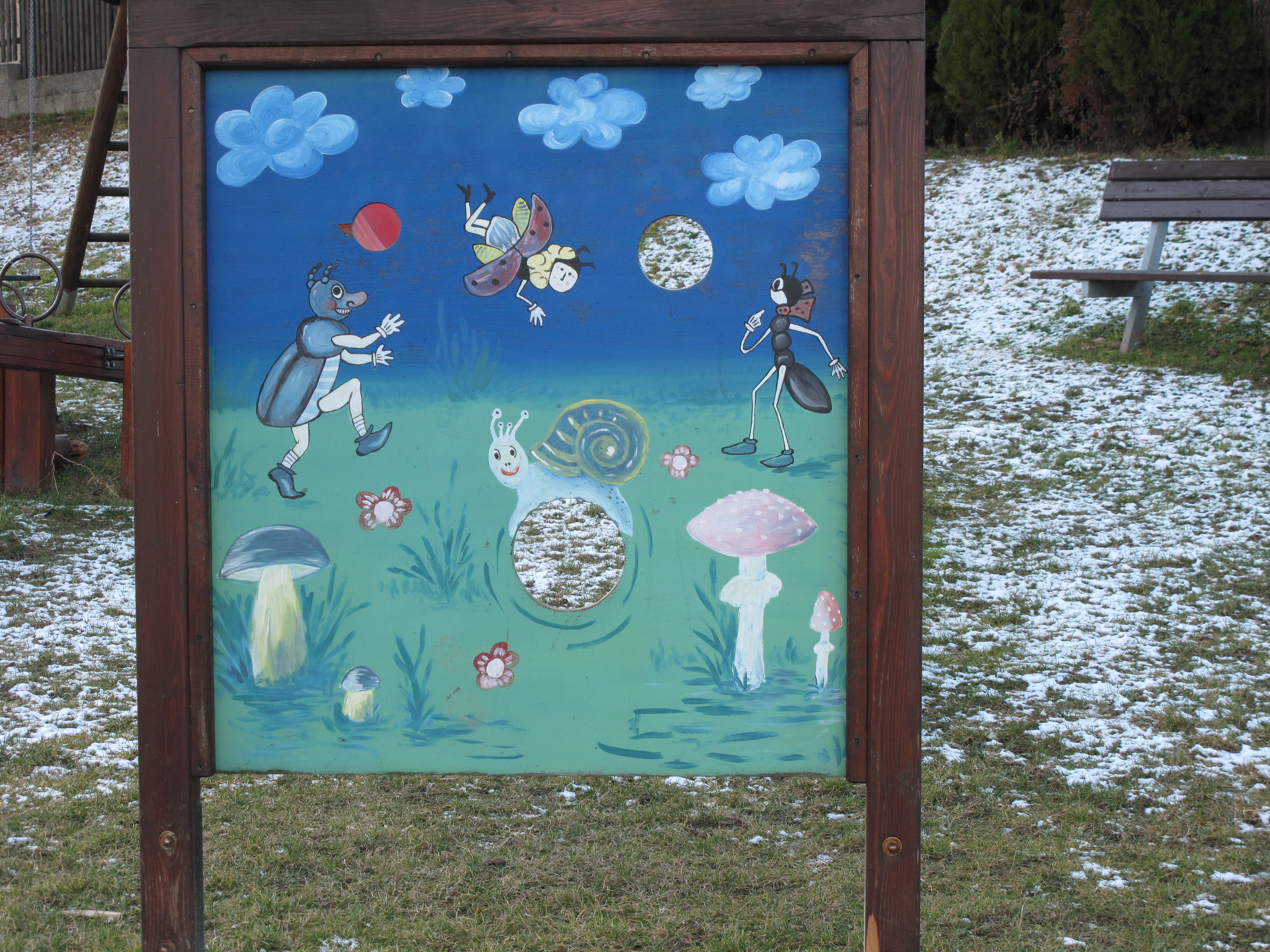
Drawing with Ferda Mravenec on the playground

Ferda Mravenec (also known as Ferdy) is a Czech literary and comics character, an anthropomorphic ant created by Ondřej Sekora, who both wrote and illustrated the stories. It was first published in 1933 in the Lidové noviny newspaper. The character appeared in many Czech children stories.

Knížka Ferdy Mravence (book of Ferdinand the Ant), which unites three previous books: Ferda Mravenec (1936), Ferda Mravenec v cizích službách (Ferda the Ant in Foreign Services, 1938) and Ferda v mraveništi (Ferda in the Anthill, 1938). Many other books about Ferda were published along with an animated TV series which premiered in 1984.

== Media ==
=== Short films ===
- Ferda Mravenec (1942)
- Příhody Ferdy Mravence (1977)
- Ferda v cizích službách (1977)
- Ferda v mraveništi (1977)
- Příhody Brouka Pytlíka (1978)
- Jak se měl Ferda ve světě (1978)

=== Television series ===
- Ferdy the Ant (1984 – 1985)
