= Marina Berlusconi =

Italian businesswoman

Marina Berlusconi OML
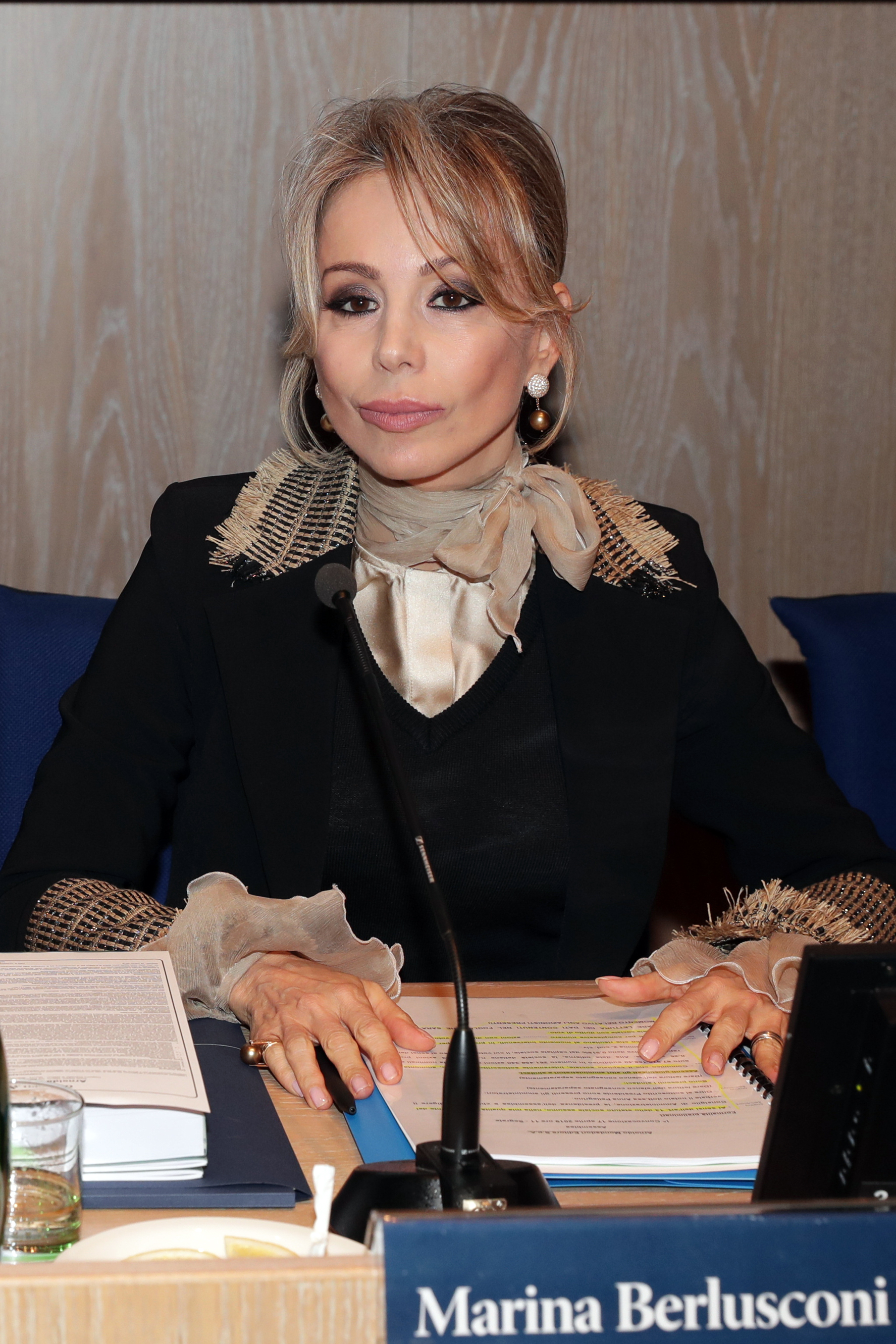
- Berlusconi in 2019
- Born: Marina Elvira Berlusconi; 10 August 1966 (age 59); Milan, Italy
- Occupation: Businesswoman
- Spouse: Maurizio Vanadia (m. 2008)
- Children: 2
- Relatives: Silvio Berlusconi (father) Pier Silvio Berlusconi (brother) Barbara Berlusconi (half-sister) Paolo Berlusconi (uncle)

Marina Elvira Berlusconi (born 10 August 1966) is an Italian businesswoman. She is the chairwoman of the holding company Fininvest and the publishing company Arnoldo Mondadori Editore, the latter being the biggest publishing company in Italy. She is the eldest daughter of businessman and former Italian prime minister Silvio Berlusconi.

== Biography ==
Marina Elvira Berlusconi was born in Milan on 10 August 1966, the daughter of Silvio Berlusconi and his first wife Carla Elvira Lucia Dall'Oglio. She is the older sister of businessman Pier Silvio Berlusconi and the older paternal half-sister of businesswoman Barbara Berlusconi. Like her brother, they both dropped their studies at the University of Milan without getting a diploma.

After graduating from high school in classical studies, Berlusconi began attending the Faculty of Law and then that of Political Science, both of which she abandoned in her first year. After an apprenticeship, she worked in several positions in the media business in Italy. She joined the board of her father's holding company Fininvest in 1994 alongside her brother, and partook in the inauguration of the Spanish channel Telecinco in 1995. In 1996, she was appointed Deputy Chairman of Fininvest by her father.

Since 2003, she has been the chairperson of Arnoldo Mondadori Editore, Italy's largest publishing company. She is also a member of the Board of Directors of MFE (until 2021 known as Mediaset SpA) and was on the Board of Directors of Mediobanca from October 2008 to April 2012.

In 2010, she was placed 48th in The World's 100 Most Powerful Women by Forbes, the only Italian on the list (where she had been since 2004). Since 2001, she has also been included in Fortune magazine's list of the 50 most influential women in the international business community. In 2013, 2016, and 2018 the US magazine The Hollywood Reporter included Berlusconi in its list of the 20 most influential women in the media TV industry.

In 2011, Berlusconi claimed that she had never thought of entering politics like her father, but admitted in 2014 that she may consider it eventually.

== Personal life ==
In December 2008, Berlusconi married Maurizio Vanadia, a former lead dancer at La Scala. They have two sons: Gabriele (born 2002) and Silvio.

== Awards ==
- 2004–2010: she was named in The World's 100 Most Powerful Woman in the world by Forbes magazine
- In 2009, the mayor of Milan, Letizia Moratti, awarded her the Gold Medal of the City of Milan (Ambrogino d'oro), as "an example of Milanese excellence in the world and the ability to reconcile professional and family life".
