= Suzy Spafford =

American cartoonist

- Born: 1945 (age 80–81) Toledo, Ohio; United States
- Areas: Writer, Artist
- Notable works: "Suzy's Zoo" characters
- Awards: National Cartoonist Society Greeting Card Award, 1996

Suzy Spafford, also known as Suzy Spafford Lidstrom (born 1945), is an American cartoonist best known for drawing whimsical animal characters. Her "Suzy's Zoo" line of greeting cards, stickers, stationery, calendars, and similar products is sold in thousands of stores all over the world. She has also written several dozen books for children, including the Tales from Duckport series.

== Business ==
Spafford's "Suzy's Zoo" greeting card company was launched in 1968, while she was still an undergraduate at San Diego State University working toward her Bachelor of Fine Arts degree. In 1999 she added a line of products for babies and toddlers, called Little Suzy's Zoo.

Her often humorous drawings feature more than 200 animal characters such as rabbits, turtles, snails and ostriches. The animals are drawn in bright colors, wearing clothes, shoes, and happy expressions. Her first fully developed animal character was a cross between a chicken and a duck, a cheerful extrovert known as Suzy Ducken. Each character has a personality and backstory; they all live in a fictional town called Duckport. At first she drew all of the characters herself, but she soon needed to hire assistants to keep up with the growing business. As of 2002, the Suzy's Zoo retail business had 50 employees and generated $50 million in annual revenue.

== Personal life ==
Born 1945 in Toledo, Ohio, Spafford grew up in San Diego, California and still lives there with her husband Ray Lidstrom, president of her company, Suzy's Zoo Studios. She graduated from Point Loma High School and San Diego State University. She is a member of Kappa Delta sorority.

She has been drawing since she was 3 years old. She was especially inspired by the fanciful drawing of Dr. Seuss, whom she describes as "one of my heroes." Her parents supported her talent by enrolling her in painting classes and later private lessons in watercolor painting. By the time she was in college, she was selling watercolor landscapes at art fairs. During slow times at the fairs she drew little cartoons of animals doing things like playing golf or fishing. Customers snapped up the animal drawings, so that her work became more and more focused on the style that became Suzy's Zoo.

She is a founding member of the San Diego Watercolor Society. She sits on the boards of directors of several charities including the Rees-Stealy Research Foundation and the San Diego/Imperial Council of the Girl Scouts of the USA.

== Recognition ==
Spafford won the National Cartoonist Society Greeting Card Award in 1996.

She was presented with the Kappa Delta Woman of Achievement Award in 1997.

In 2003, the local Girl Scout council honored her with their annual "Cool Women" award, given to local women who serve as outstanding role models for girls as they balance work, family, friends and service.

== Animated series ==
An animated series of Suzy's Zoo entitled Suzy's Zoo: A Day with Witzy, co-produced by Suzy's Zoo Film Partners and the Tokyo Broadcasting System (TBS) network, began broadcasting on BabyFirstTV on March 23, 2015, starring Alyson Leigh Rosenfeld as Witzy.

== Bibliography ==
- Alphabetical Soup, Suzy's Zoo (San Diego, CA), 1995
- Witzy and Zoom Zoom, Suzy's Zoo (San Diego, CA), 1998
- Witzy Wonders, Scholastic Inc. (New York, NY), 2001
- Witzy's Opposites, Lyric Pub. (Allen, TX), 2001
- Witzy's Colors, Lyric Pub. (Allen, TX), 2001
- Witzy's Book of Words, Scholastic (New York, NY), 2001
- Witzy's Block Party, Scholastic (New York, NY), 2001
- Friends Forever, Lyric Pub. (Allen, TX), 2001
- Witzy to the Rescue, Lyric Pub. (Allen, TX), 2001
- Witzy Plays Hide-and-Seek, Scholastic (New York, NY), 2001
- Back to School? Cool!, Scholastic Inc. (New York, NY), 2002
- Trick or Treat? Neat!, Scholastic Inc. (New York, NY), 2002
- Witzy's Winter Wonderland, Scholastic (New York, NY), 2002
- Witzy's Backyard Easter Hunt, Scholastic Inc. (New York, NY), 2002
- Witzy's Numbers, Scholastic (New York, NY), 2002
- Witzy's Shapes, Scholastic (New York, NY), 2002
- Stormy Weather? Stick Together!, Scholastic (New York, NY), 2003
- Helping-out Day?: Hooray!, Scholastic (New York, NY), 2003
- You're One Hot Diggety Dog, Harvest House Publishers (Eugene, OR), 2004
- Witzy's Halloween Ghost, Dalmatian Press (Franklin, TN), 2011
