= Fedele Confalonieri =

Italian manager (born 1937)

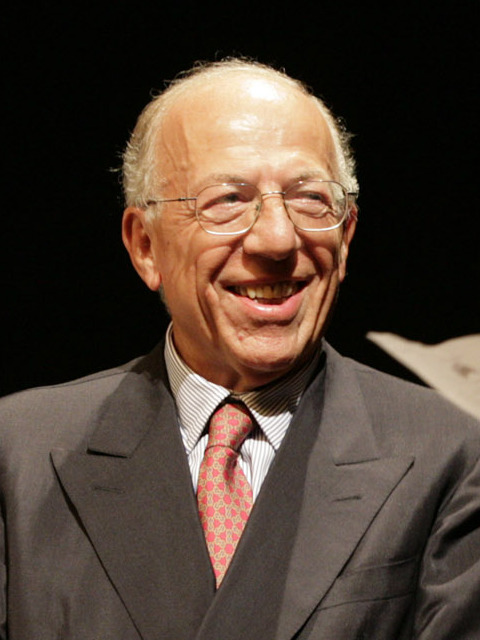
Fedele Confalonieri in 2008

Fedele Confalonieri (born 6 August 1937, in Milan) is an Italian manager and president of Mediaset and since 2017, he has served as president of the Venerable Factory of the Duomo of Milan.

== Biography ==
Confalonieri grew up in the Isola district of Milan, where he formed a friendship with Silvio Berlusconi. The two traveled the world together as piano bar musicians on cruise ships.

Graduating in law from the University of Milan, he followed his friend Berlusconi from the beginning in the television adventure, holding positions of responsibility in the Biscione companies. Fedele Confalonieri became president of Mediaset, board member of Arnoldo Mondadori spa and board member of the newspaper Il Giornale. He was a member of the board of directors and of the junta of Confindustria and Assolombarda. He was also president of the National Television Association, president of La Scala theater Philharmonic Orchestra and president of the Committee for Giuseppe Verdi celebrations. In October 2007 Confalonieri received his piano diploma at the Verdi Conservatory in Milan, with a program that included Beethoven's Passionate, a Brahms Rhapsody, Mussorgsky's Pictures of an Exhibition and Schumann's Fantasy. He was member of the Aspen Institute.

On 18 July 2017, he was elected President of the Veneranda Fabbrica del Duomo in Milan. Under his presidency, the tightening of access controls at Milan Cathedral has marked a departure from the historical customs of Milan and Northern Italy, where entry to places of worship was traditionally governed by common sense and substantial decorum rather than rigid formal protocols. The main criticism directed at the current management concerns the transformation of a moral norm into a mandatory bureaucratic restriction (such as the ban on knee-length shorts for men), a practice historically absent from local tradition. This shift, perceived by part of the citizenry as an imposition alien to the territory's pragmatic identity, has fueled journalistic controversies, leading some detractors to satirically dub Confalonieri the "Taliban of Milan".

On 31 July 2018, for a corporate cut of commercial TV, he is no longer an employee of the same, but still retains the role of president.

== Judicial proceedings ==
In April 2008, Confalonieri was brought to trial by the Judge of the preliminary of Milan hearing on charges of tax fraud. The power of attorney contested Confalonieri with alleged crimes committed between 2001 and 2003. With regard to this proceeding, he was acquitted both in the first and second instance. On February 20, 2009 he was indicted for aiding and abetting as part of the investigation into the bankruptcy of Hdc, Luigi Crespi's polling company.

In January 2010, he was challenged for tax fraud in the Mediatrade-Rti investigation. On 18 October 2011, the Judge of the preliminary of Milan brought Pier Silvio Berlusconi and Fedele Confalonieri to trial and acquitted Silvio Berlusconi, considering the evidence against him insufficient.

On 22 May 2014, the prosecutor De Pasquale asked for 3 years and 2 months of imprisonment for Berlusconi Jr., 3 years and 4 months for Confalonieri, 3 years and 8 months for Frank Agrama (the alleged occult partner of his father in the sale of TV rights) and other sentences for some managers of the group.

The following 8 July, Berlusconi Jr. and Confalonieri (together with Agrama) were prescribed for the events of 2005 and acquitted for those of 2006, 2007 and 2008 "because the fact did not constitute a crime". On 17 March 2016, the Court of Appeal of Milan overturned the first instance sentence, condemning Berlusconi and Confalonieri to a 1-year and 2-month prison sentence for 2007 events while they were prescribed for 2006 and acquitted for 2008 "because the fact was no longer foreseen as a crime"; the prosecutors asked for 3 years and 2 months for the first and 3 years and 4 months for the second. The Court ordered the temporary disqualification from management offices and the prohibition on contracting with the public administration, as well as a compensation of 20,000 euros to the Revenue Agency as accessory penalties.

On 18 October 2016, the Court of Cassation quashed the postponement of one year and two months of imprisonment issued on appeal in the Mediatrade trial without delay.

== Honours and awards ==
- Italy: Commander of the Order of Merit of the Italian Republic – 16 November 1984
- Italy: Grand Officer of the Order of Merit of the Italian Republic – 13 March 1987
- Italy: Knight Grand Cross of the Order of Merit of the Italian Republic – 27 December 1989
