= Marta Fascina =

Italian politician (born 1990)

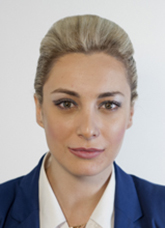
- Marta Fascina in 2018

Member of the Chamber of Deputies
- Incumbent
- Assumed office 22 March 2018
- Constituency: Campania

Personal details
- Born: Marta Antonia Fascina; 9 January 1990 (age 36) Melito di Porto Salvo, Calabria, Italy
- Party: Forza Italia
- Domestic partner: Silvio Berlusconi (2020–2023; his death)
- Education: Sapienza University of Rome

Marta Fascina (born 9 January 1990) is an Italian politician from Forza Italia. She has been a member of the Chamber of Deputies since the 2018 Italian general election.

== Early life and education ==
She was born in Melito di Porto Salvo, Calabria, a small coastal town at the southern tip of the Italian Peninsula. She attended the Sapienza University of Rome, graduating with a degree in literature in 2018.

== Personal life ==
From March 2020 until his death, Fascina dated former Prime Minister of Italy, Silvio Berlusconi, who was 53 years her senior.

She inherited Berlusconi's mansion in Arcore along with a substantial sum of up to €100 million.
