= Iva Hercíková =

Czech writer

Iva Hercíková (Czech pronunciation: [ˈɪva ˈɦɛrtsiːkovaː]; 2 November 1935 in Pardubice, Czechoslovakia – 27 January 2007 in Czech Republic) was a Czech writer and author of novels and movie scripts.

== Career ==
Iva Hercíková, née Vodňanská, graduated from grammar school in Liberec in 1954. She studied dramaturgy and theatre sciences at DAMU, the Academy of Performing Arts in Prague, graduating in 1958. She married her second husband, Jiří Robert Pick, in 1961.

== Emigration ==
In 1986, Hercíková emigrated with her third husband to Germany and in 1987 to the United States. They settled in Florida and then in Manhattan, New York. She retained her Czech citizenship.

== Velvet revolution ==
After the Velvet revolution Hercíková spent several months in Prague. She moved back to the Czech Republic in 2000, where she lived until her suicide at the age of 71.

== Death ==
On 27 January 2007, Iva Hercikova committed suicide. She was 71.
