= The Louse and the Flea =

German fairy tale

Folk tale
- Name: The Louse and the Flea
- Also known as: Little Louse and Little Flea
- Aarne–Thompson grouping: ATU 2022 (An Animal Mourns the Death of a Spouse)
- Country: Germany
- Published in: Grimms' Fairy Tales

"The Louse and the Flea" or "Little Louse and Little Flea" (German: Läuschen und Flöhchen) is a German fairy tale collected by the Brothers Grimm, number 30.

It is Aarne-Thompson type 2022, An Animal Mourns the Death of a Spouse, and takes the form of a chain tale, sometimes known as a cumulative tale. Wilhelm Grimm probably heard the story from Dorothea Catharina Wild in 1808.

== Synopsis ==
A louse and a flea are married until the louse drowns while brewing. The flea mourns, inspiring a door to ask why and start creaking, which inspires a broom to ask why and start sweeping—through a sequence of objects until a spring overflows at the news and drowns them all.

== Variants ==
In some versions, the louse and the flea are replaced by a ladybird and a fly.
