= Queen Kong =

- German theatrical release poster
- Directed by: Frank Agrama
- Screenplay by: Frank Agrama; Ron Dobrin; Fabio Piccioni
- Story by: Fabio Piccioni; Robin Dobria
- Starring: Robin Askwith; Rula Lenska; Valerie Leon; Linda Hayden
- Cinematography: Ian Wilson
- Edited by: David Campling
- Music by: Pepper
- Production companies: Cine-Art München; Dexter Film London
- Distributed by: Constantin Film (Germany)
- Release date: 10 December 1976 (Germany)
- Running time: 84 minutes
- Countries: United Kingdom; West Germany
- Language: English
- Budget: $632,000

Queen Kong is a 1976 British-West German adventure comedy film directed by Frank Agrama and starring Robin Askwith, Rula Lenska and Valerie Leon. It was written by Agram, Ron Dobrin and Fabio Piccioni. The film is a parody of King Kong.

== Plot ==
This film switches the traditional roles of females and males and reverses the sexes of the original cast of King Kong. The main character Ray Fay plays the damsel in distress, which tends to usually be played by women. He is kidnapped by film director Luce Habit to star in her new African jungle movie. He then finds himself the attraction of an amorous giant female gorilla that pursues him across London.

== Main cast ==
- Robin Askwith as Ray Fay
- Rula Lenska as Luce Habit
- Valerie Leon as Queen of the Nabongas
- Roger Hammond as Woolf
- Linda Hayden as the singing nun
- John Clive as Comedian
- Carol Drinkwater as Ima Goodbody
- Anthony Morton as antique dealer
- Vicki Michelle as crew girl
- Anna Bergman as crew girl
- Geraldine Gardner as crew girl
- Jeannie Collings as crew girl

== Production ==
The film was shot at Shepperton Studios and on location around London and Newhaven. In addition, miniature sets were created. They utilised the scale model of London at the now defunct Bournemouth theme park Tucktonia.

== Release ==
The film was never released theatrically in the United Kingdom, due to legal action by Dino De Laurentiis, producer of the 1976 King Kong remake and RKO, the copyright holder of King Kong at the time. It got a limited release in Italy and Germany. The film has since been released on DVD.

== Japanese parody ==
1998, a troupe of Japanese comedians produced their own Japanese dialogue for the film, in a similar spirit to Woody Allen's What's Up, Tiger Lily?; this version with the new Japanese dialogue was released on DVD in 2001.

== Novelisation ==
The film was novelized by James Moffat and published by Everest Books in 1977.
