= Veronica Lario =

Italian actress (born 1956)

Spouse of the Prime Minister of Italy
- In role 8 May 2008 – 10 May 2010
- Prime Minister: Silvio Berlusconi
- Preceded by: Flavia Franzoni
- Succeeded by: Elsa Antonioli (2011)
- In role 11 June 2001 – 17 May 2006
- Prime Minister: Silvio Berlusconi
- Preceded by: Diana Vincenzi
- Succeeded by: Flavia Franzoni
- In role 11 May 1994 – 15 January 1995
- Prime Minister: Silvio Berlusconi
- Preceded by: Franca Pilla
- Succeeded by: Donatella Pasquali Zingone

Personal details
- Born: July 19, 1956 (age 69) Bologna, Italy
- Spouse: Silvio Berlusconi (m. 1990; div. 2010)
- Children: Barbara, Eleonora, Luigi
- Occupation: Actress

Veronica Lario (born Miriam Raffaella Bartolini, 19 July 1956) is a former Italian actress and the former wife of ex-Italian Prime Minister Silvio Berlusconi.

== Biography ==
Born in Bologna, Lario was a stage actress under Enrico Maria Salerno, with whom she had a love affair. She also worked in theatrical plays with well-known actors; her most famous role is in Tenebrae (1982) by horror master Dario Argento. She retired from acting after meeting Silvio Berlusconi. Married on 15 December 1990, Berlusconi and Lario have three children together: Barbara Berlusconi (1984), Eleonora (1986), and Luigi (1988). In the 1980s, before the birth of their firstborn child Barbara, Lario terminated an earlier pregnancy with an induced abortion, in order not to give birth to a child affected by significant morbidity.

As the wife of the Italian premier, Lario chose to maintain a low public profile. She avoided most public events and meetings and seldom accompanied her husband at official meetings. On the other hand, she was known to publicly express political opinions in contrast to those of her then-husband, for example on bioethics or in backing protesters demonstrating against the war in Iraq. Lario's husband was never shy about mentioning her on public occasions, and he alluded at least once to a supposed affair between her and philosopher and opposition politician Massimo Cacciari.

On 31 January 2007, Lario said her dignity had been damaged by comments Berlusconi reportedly made during the VIP party after a TV awards ceremony broadcast by one of his channels. According to reports widely carried in the Italian press, Berlusconi told showgirl and future parliamentarian Mara Carfagna, "If I weren't married I would marry you immediately." He reportedly told another, "With you, I'd go anywhere." Lario's letter appeared in La Repubblica, a nationally prominent newspaper. She declared: "I see these statements as damaging my dignity. To both my husband and the public man, I therefore demand a public apology, since I haven't received any privately. I have faced the inevitable contrasts and the more painful moments that a long conjugal relation entails with respect and discretion." Lario added, "Now I write to state my reaction", saying her husband's comments were "unacceptable" and could not be reduced to mere jokes. After a few hours, Berlusconi responded with a public letter to his wife and apologized for what he had said three days earlier.

In April 2009, Lario once more published an open letter, criticising her husband for consorting with young ladies, and defining his chosen candidates for the European Parliament as "shameless rubbish". On 3 May 2009, it was reported that she was to file for divorce, which under Italian law can only be started after a couple has reached a separation agreement. On 10 May 2010, it was revealed that a separation settlement had been reached, with Berlusconi agreeing to make alimony payments of €3.6 million per year, and allowing her to live in their luxury home near Milan.

In December 2012, a Milan court established that Berlusconi would be required to pay his ex-wife €3 million a month (€36 million a year). In 2015 on 23 June 2015, the Court of Justice of Milan established that Berlusconi would pay his ex-wife €1.4 million a month. On 16 November 2017, the Court of Appeal of Milan established that Berlusconi would not have to pay the €1.4 million per month to his ex-wife, who was ordered to give back the amounts she received since 2014 (approximately €60 million).
