= Ondřej Sekora =

Czech artist and writer (1899–1967)

- Born: 25 September 1899; Brno, Austria-Hungary
- Died: 4 July 1967 (aged 67); Prague, Czechoslovakia
- Occupations: Writer, illustrator, painter, journalist, sport reporter
- Writing career
- Notable works: Ferda Mravenec; Trampoty brouka Pytlíka

Ondřej Sekora (25 September 1899 – 4 July 1967) was a Czech painter, illustrator, writer, journalist and entomologist. He is known mainly as an author of children books. Sekora was also one of the first propagators of rugby in Czechoslovakia.

== Biography ==
In 1919, Sekora graduated from the gymnasium in Vyškov. He then studied at the Faculty of Law of Masaryk University. From 1921, he worked as a sports editor, illustrator, reporter and commentator for Lidové noviny newspaper in Brno. In 1923, he married Markéta Kalabusová, but was divorced a year later. From 1929 to 1931, he studied privately as a pupil of Professor Arnošt Hofbauer. In 1927, the editorial office of Lidové noviny moved to Prague.

Sekora married his second wife, Ludmila Roubíčková, in 1931. A year later they had a son, who was also named Ondřej. In 1941, during World War II, he was forced to leave his job and expelled from the Federation of Czech Journalists. The reason was his mixed marriage. His second wife, Ludmila, was of Jewish origin, and the whole family was persecuted by Germans as racially mixed. From October 1944 to April 1945, he was imprisoned in the German labor camps in Kleinstein (Poland) and Osterode (Germany). His wife was deported to the Theresienstadt concentration camp. In Osterode, Sekora met and befriended Czech actor Oldřich Nový, with whom he attempted to organize the puppet theatre in the camp. Both Sekora and his wife survived the imprisonment, and he later described his experience in his diary.

Following World War II he worked as an editor in the magazines Práce and Dikobraz. From 1949, he also led one of the sections of the Státní nakladatelství dětské knihy (SNDK) (State Publishing House of Children Books). In his later years Sekora devoted himself solely to painting, writing and illustration. In 1964, he was awarded the Meritorious Artist title, and in 1966 he received the Marie Majerová Prize. His public activities ceased in 1964, after a heart attack. He died on 4 July 1967, and is buried in Prague-Košíře.

He was a member of the Communist Party of Czechoslovakia. In the post-war years he actively participated in the Czechoslovak communist agitation and propaganda.

Sekora trained the first Czech rugby clubs, Moravská Slávie in Brno-Pisárky and AFK Žižka Brno among others. He also created the Czech rugby terminology. He co-founded and edited the magazine Sport.

The Main-belt asteroid 13406 Sekora, discovered in 1999, is named after him.

== Rugby ==
Rugby union was introduced to Czechoslovakia (as it was then) by Ondřej Sekora, when he returned from living in France in 1926, with a rugby ball and set of rules. Brno, the Moravian capital is considered the cradle of rugby in Czechoslovakia, and is where the first match took place, between SK Moravská Slávie, based in Brno-Pisárky, and AFK Žižka, based in Brno. Both of these teams were trained by Sekora, who also coined Czech language rugby terminology.

== Style ==
Sekora became popular as an author of comic strips, published in Lidové noviny in the 1930s and at the beginning of the 1940s. He was inspired by cartoons of Walt Disney, Wilhelm Busch and Albert Dubout. His short stories were full of humor, with indications of situation comedy. The basis of his style was lively and dynamic drawing with clear contours, accompanied with quatrains. His verses were often inspired by folk speech. He is known as the creator of animated characters Ferda Mravenec ("Ferda the Ant") and Brouk Pytlík ("Pouch the Beetle").

== Selected works ==
Books

- Rugby, jak se hraje a jeho pravidla ("Rugby, How to Play It and the Rules") (1926, translated from French)
- Ferda Mravenec ("Ferda the Ant") (1936)
- Ferda Mravenec v cizích službách (1937)
- Ferda v mraveništi ("Ferda in the Anthill") (1938)
- Ferdův slabikář ("Ferda's Primer") (1939)
- Trampoty brouka Pytlíka ("Troubles of Pouch the Beetle") (1939)
- Malířské kousky brouka Pytlíka (1940)
- Kuře Napipi a jeho přátelé ("The Chicken Napipi and its Friends") (1941)
- Uprchlík na ptačím stromě (1943) (awarded at the Expo 58 in Brussels)
- Ferda cvičí mraveniště (1947)
- Kronika města Kocourkova ("The Chronicles of the Town of Kocourkov") (1947)
- Jak se uhlí pohněvalo (1949)
- Pohádka o stromech a větru ("Fairy Tale about the Trees and Wind") (1949)
- O zlém brouku Bramborouku (1950)
- Ferda Mravenec ničí škůdce přírody (1951)
- Malované počasí ("Painted Weather") (1951)
- O traktoru, který se splašil (1951)
- Mravenci se nedají (1954)
- Na dvoře si děti hrály (1955)
- Čmelák Aninka ("Aninka the Bumblebee") (1959)
- Hurá za Zdendou (1960)
- O psu vzduchoplavci (1961)
- Pošta v ZOO ("Post in ZOO") (1963)

The first three books about Ferda Mravenec were published in 1960s under the title Knížka Ferdy Mravence (The Book of Ferda the Ant).

Both books of Brouk Pytlík ("Pouch the Beetle") were published since 1969 under the title Brouk Pytlík.

Comics

- Voříškova dobrodružství (1926)
- Jak Cvoček honil pytláka (1932)
- Kapitán Animuk loví v Africe (1934)
- Hej a Rup (1935)
- Slavnost u broučků (1938)
- Kousky mládence Ferdy Mravence (1950)
- Nápady kuřete Napipi (1961)
- Kapitán Animuk opět loví v Africe (1972)

Book illustration

- Jindřich Plachta: Pučálkovic Amina (1931)
- Vladislav Vančura: Kubula a Kuba Kubikula (1931)
- Hugo Vavris: František Lelíček ve službách Sherlocka Holmese (1932)
- František Langer: Bratrstvo bílého klíče (1934)
- Jiří Weiss: O věrné Hadimršce … a co se kolem ní sběhlo (1935), published by Melantrich
- Arthur Ransome: Zamrzlá loď kapitána Flinta (1937)
- Josef Kopta: Smějte se s bláznem (1939)
- Jarmila Hašková: Z notesu svatého Petra (1940)
- Jan Karafiát: Broučci (1940)
- Josef Věromír Pleva: Malý Bobeš (1941)
- Ema Tintěrová: Veselé příhody kozy Lujzy a kocoura Bobka (1942)
- Jan Malík: Míček Flíček (1946)
- Mikhail Zoshchenko: Psí čich (1946)
- Eduard Štorch: Lovci mamutů na Bílé skále (1946)
- Václav Čtvrtek: Lev utekl (1948)
- František Němec: Soudničky (1948)
- Ema Řezáčová: Dům na kolečkách (1948)
- Václav Lacina: Slyš a piš ("Listen and Write") (1949)
- Jarmila Minaříková: Ježourek a Pišta, jeho bratr (1949)
- Irina Karnauchová: Chytrý sedláček a jiné pohádky ("Clever Peasant and Other Fairytales") (1954)
- Gianni Rodari: O statečném Cibulkovi ("The Adventures of the Little Onion") (1955)
- Jan Hostáň: Švitořilky (1961)

== See also ==
- Rugby union in the Czech Republic
