= Paolo Berlusconi =

Italian businessman

Paolo Berlusconi (born 6 December 1949) is an Italian businessman. He is the younger brother of the former Italian prime minister Silvio Berlusconi. He is the publisher of the newspaper Il Giornale and the head of the investment group Paolo Berlusconi Finanzaria.

== Personal life ==
Paolo Berlusconi is the third child in a middle class Milan family and the younger brother of Silvio Berlusconi.

He has four children, two from his first marriage with Mariella Bocciardo (Alessia and Luna Roberta), and two from his second marriage with Antonia Rosa Costanzo (Davide Luigi and Nicole). In 1996, he divorced his second wife and from 2000 he had a relationship with the model Katia Noventa and from 2001 to 2006 with the showgirl Natalia Estrada.

== Career ==
In 1990, an Italian law was passed that prohibited the simultaneous ownership of a newspaper and a television station (the Mammi Law). Thereafter Silvio Berlusconi, owner of three television channels and the daily Il Giornale, ceded control of the newspaper to his brother Paolo. Silvio kept a minority interest through the Mondadori group. As of 2004, Paolo was still the co-owner of Società Europea di Edizioni, the publisher of Il Giornale.

Since the early nineties, the Paolo Berlusconi Finanziaria S.r.l (PBF) bought part of Fininvest as well as directly investing in various other sectors such as construction (Italcantieri), real estate (gruppo Edilnord), textile (Zambieti) and media (Solari.com S.r.l). In 2011, PBF strengthened its influence in the publishing sector by acquiring a majority share of the newspaper Il Foglio, taking over the 38% of the shares held by Veronica Lario, the second wife of Silvio Berlusconi.

On 3 February 2013 Berlusconi, in his capacity as vice-chairman of AC Milan, appeared to be caught on video referring to footballer Mario Balotelli in racially derogatory terms. Berlusconi said the remarks were meant to be affectionate and not derogatory.

== Judicial inquiries ==
In 2002, Berlusconi was charged with fraud and corruption for his involvement as head of Simec in a landfill scandal in Cerro Maggiore near Milan. He was conditionally sentenced to one year and nine months in prison and fined a sum of 49 million euro.

In June 2009, Berlusconi and the S.E.G. (Societa Europea Golf) had to pay 4.5 million euro in compensation and 150,000 euro in legal fees to the commune of Pieve Emanuele.

On 12 January 2010, he was sentenced to four months in prison for falsifying invoices.
