= Pier Silvio Berlusconi =

Italian media businessman

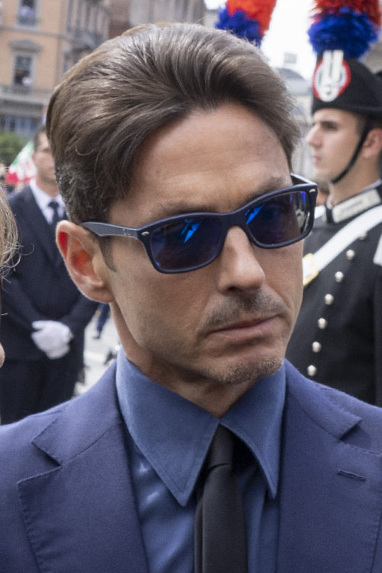
- Born: Pier Silvio Berlusconi; 28 April 1969 (age 57); Milan, Italy
- Occupation: Media businessman
- Partner(s): Emanuela Mussida; Silvia Toffanin (since 2002)
- Children: 3
- Parent(s): Silvio Berlusconi; Carla Lucia Elvira Dall'Oglio
- Relatives: Marina Berlusconi (sister); Barbara Berlusconi (half-sister); Paolo Berlusconi (uncle)

Pier Silvio Berlusconi (born 28 April 1969) is an Italian media businessman. He is the son of the former Italian prime minister Silvio Berlusconi and his first wife Carla Lucia Elvira Dall'Oglio. As a shareholder of Fininvest, the Berlusconi family's holding company, Pier Silvio Berlusconi plays a significant role in the management of the Mediaset Group, now known as MFE - MediaForEurope, where he serves as Executive Vice President and managing director.

Additionally, he holds the position of President at RTI, the Italian company responsible for all television activities within the Mediaset group. Furthermore, he sits on the boards of directors of MFE-MediaForEurope, Mediaset España, Mondadori, and Publitalia.

== Biography ==
Pier Silvio Berlusconi was born on 28 April 1969 in Milan, Italy. He has one older sister, Maria Elvira "Marina" (born in 1966) and three younger half-siblings from his father's second marriage: Barbara (1984), Eleonora (1986) and Luigi (1988). His paternal grandparents were Luigi Berlusconi (1908–1989) and Rosa Bossi (1911–2008), with paternal uncles Maria Antonietta (1943–2009) and Paolo Berlusconi (1949).

He attended a classical high school in Milan, and subsequently enrolled in the philosophy degree course at the University of Milan.

=== Career ===
Pier Silvio Berlusconi embarked on his professional experience in 1992 within Publitalia, the group's advertising agency, before transitioning to roles within Italia 1 television network. By November 1996, he assumed responsibility for coordinating the schedules and programming across the Mediaset networks. In 1999, he was appointed deputy General Director of Content at R.T.I., overseeing television operations. Since April 2000, Pier Silvio Berlusconi has held the role of Vice President at Mediaset, now known as MFE, and assumed the CEO position in 2015.

In 2016, he founded RadioMediaset, a radio conglomerate comprising Radio 105, R101, Virgin Radio, Radio Monte Carlo and Radio Subasio. As of the first half of 2023, RadioMediaset stands as the leading Italian radio broadcaster in terms of listenership, according to TER data.

=== In MFE - MediaForEurope ===
During his tenure, on 8 April 2016, Pier Silvio Berlusconi finalized an agreement with Vivendi aimed at fostering new projects and an equal exchange of 3.5% shares between the parent companies. These initiatives included the establishment of a European major for content creation on an international scale, bolstered by distribution across the TV networks of both groups in Italy, France and Spain. Additionally, plans were set in motion for a pan-European platform for streaming on-demand content, alongside the integration of Mediaset Premium into a large international pay TV network. However, in July 2017, Vivendi announced its intention to revise the agreement, a proposal that Mediaset rejected, sparking a dispute between the two entities. This dispute persisted until May 3, 2021, when a new agreement was finally reached.

In 2019, Pier Silvio Berlusconi led the group in acquiring shares of ProSiebenSat.1, the second-largest European radio and television group in terms of households reached, securing a 9.6% stake. Subsequent purchases boosted Mediaset's ownership to 25.01% by 2022, establishing it as the largest shareholder in 2022.

On 1 October 2021, at Pier Silvio Berlusconi's suggestion, the Mediaset Board of Directors proposed renaming the company to MFE-MediaForEurope. The proposal was approved by the shareholders' meeting on 25 November 2021.

== Personal life ==
From his relationship with Emanuela Mussida, Lucrezia Vittoria Berlusconi was born in 1990, and in 2021, she made him a grandfather at the age of 52.

Since 2002, he has been in a relationship with television presenter Silvia Toffanin. Together they have two children: Lorenzo Mattia, born on 10 June 2010 and Sofia Valentina, born on 10 September 2015.

The family primarily lives in a residence located in the village of Paraggi, adjacent to the municipality of Portofino. In recognition of his contributions, Pier Silvio Berlusconi was granted the title of honorary citizen by Portofino on 20 October 2019.

Despite receiving favorable support from Forza Italia, Fratelli d'Italia and Lega, according to polls in the summer of 2023 he decided against entering politics to succeed his father.

On 10 September 2023, all of Silvio Berlusconi's children unanimously accepted their inheritance, following his predetermined provisions. The two siblings from Silvio Berlusconi's first marriage are entitled to 52% of the family holding.
