= Controversies surrounding Silvio Berlusconi =

Silvio Berlusconi (1936–2023) was an Italian media mogul and a Prime Minister of Italy who owned the largest broadcasting company in that country, Mediaset. His promises to sell off his personal assets to avoid conflicts of interest were never fulfilled, which sparked controversy throughout his terms in office. These events were widely covered by the media, drawing outcry from a number of his Italian contemporaries and worldwide counterparts.

== Controversies ==
=== Economic conflicts of interest ===
According to journalists Marco Travaglio and Enzo Biagi, Berlusconi entered politics to save his companies from bankruptcy and himself from convictions. From the very beginning he said it clearly to his associates. Berlusconi's supporters hailed him as the "novus homo", an outsider who was going to bring a new efficiency to the public bureaucracy and reform the state from top to bottom. While investigating these matters, three journalists noted the following facts:

- Mediobanca's annual report about the 10 biggest Italian companies showed that, in 1992, Berlusconi's media and finance group Fininvest had about 7,140 billion lire of debts, 8,193 billion lire of assets (with 35% of liquidity) and a net worth of 1,053 billion lire. The asset-debt ratio represented a patrimonial situation bordering on bankruptcy.
- Between 1992 and 1993, Fininvest was investigated several times by prosecutors in Milan, Turin and Rome. The investigations regarded: alleged bribes (to political parties and public officials with the aim of getting contracts), alleged fake invoicing by Publitalia, the financing of political congresses and abuse of television frequencies.
- On the other hand, Bruno Vespa noticed that "In January 1994, Silvio Berlusconi was under no proceedings. Two members of the staff from the Ministry of the Finances were charged to be corrupted for a minor episode by a Fininvest manager, but the accusation would have later fallen. Aldo Brancher, who was working with Fininvest at the time, was charged for having financed some stands at the "Feste dell'Unità" and "L'Avanti!", and he would have been declared fully not guilty only in 2004. Paolo Berlusconi [Silvio Berlusconi's brother] was instead arrested [...] after the Cavaliere went into politics." After having decided to enter the political arena, Berlusconi was investigated for forty different inquests in less than two years.

Controversy concerning Berlusconi's conflicts of interest are usually centered around the use of his media and marketing power for political gain. However, there is also controversy regarding his financial gains. When RAI was being run by a two-man team appointed by the presidents of the Chamber of Deputies and the Senate (both in Berlusconi's coalition), the state broadcaster increased its viewers, but lost a significant share of its advertising revenue to the rival Mediaset group, owned and run by the Berlusconi family, which has led to large personal gain. Berlusconi's governments passed some laws that have shortened statutory terms for tax fraud. Romano Prodi, who defeated Berlusconi in 2006, claimed that these were ad personam laws, meant to solve Berlusconi's problems and defend his interests.

=== Relationship with media ===
==== Media control and conflict of interest ====
Berlusconi's extensive control over the media has been widely criticised by some analysts, some press freedom organisations, and extensively on several Italian newspapers, national and private TV channels by opposition leaders and in general opposition parties members, who allege Italy's media has limited freedom of expression. However such coverage of the complaint in practice put under discussion the point of the complaint itself. The Freedom of the Press 2004 Global Survey, an annual study issued by the American organisation Freedom House, downgraded Italy's ranking from 'Free' to 'Partly Free' due to Berlusconi's influence over RAI, a ranking which, in "Western Europe" was shared only with Turkey (as of 2005). Reporters Without Borders states that in 2004, "The conflict of interests involving prime minister Silvio Berlusconi and his vast media empire was still not resolved and continued to threaten news diversity". In April 2004, the International Federation of Journalists joined the criticism, objecting to the passage of a law vetoed by Carlo Azeglio Ciampi in 2003, which critics believe is designed to protect Berlusconi's reported 90% control of the Italian national media.

Berlusconi owned via Mediaset 3 of 7 national TV channels: (Canale 5, Italia 1, and Rete 4). To better understand the controversies over a conflict of interest between Berlusconi's personal business empire and his political office, it is necessary to look at the structure of governmental control over State television. Under the law, the Speakers of the two Houses appoint the RAI president and board of directors. In practice, the decision is a political one, generally resulting in some opposition representatives becoming directors, while top managerial posts go to people sympathetic to the government. It was normal to have two directors and the president belonging to the parliamentary majority, and two directors who are opposition supporters. A parliamentary supervisory commission also exists, whose president is traditionally a member of the opposition. During the tenure of Mr. Baldassarre as RAI president, the two opposition directors and the one closer to the Union of Christian and Centre Democrats left over internal disagreements that mainly regarded censorship issues. RAI continued to be run by a two-man team (mockingly nicknamed by the opposition the Japanese after the Japanese soldiers who kept fighting on in the Pacific Ocean after the end of World War II).

The former Italian center-left coalition of Romano Prodi was often criticised for failing to pass a law to regulate the potential conflict of interest that might arise between media ownership and the holding of political office, despite having governed Italy for an entire legislature from 1996 to 2001. In 2002, Luciano Violante, a prominent member of the Democrats of the Left, said in a speech to the Chamber of Deputies: "Honourable Anedda, I invite you to ask the honourable Berlusconi, because he certainly knows that he received a full guarantee in 1994, when the government changed—that TV stations would not be touched. He knows it and the Honourable Letta knows it." He also observed that, under the center-left governments from 1996 to 2001, Mediaset's revenue had increased by 25%. The authors of the book Inciucio cite Violante's speech as evidence for the idea that the center-left coalition made a deal with Berlusconi in 1994, in which a promise was made not to honour a law in the Constitutional Court of Italy that would have required Berlusconi to give up one of his three TV channels in order to uphold pluralism and competition. According to the authors, this would be an explanation of why the center-left coalition, despite having won the 1996 elections, did not pass a law to solve the conflicts of interest between media ownership and politics.

Berlusconi's influence over RAI became evident when in Sofia, Bulgaria, he expressed his views on journalists Enzo Biagi and Michele Santoro, and comedian Daniele Luttazzi. Berlusconi said that they "use television as a criminal means of communication". They lost their jobs as a result. This statement was called by critics "Editto Bulgaro". The TV broadcasting of a satirical programme called RAIot was censored in November 2003 after the comedian Sabina Guzzanti made outspoken criticism of the Berlusconi media empire. Mediaset, one of Berlusconi's companies, sued RAI over Guzzanti's program, demanding 20 million euros for "damages"; in November 2003, the show was cancelled by the president of RAI, Lucia Annunziata. The details of the event were made into a Michael Moore-style documentary called Viva Zapatero!, which was produced by Guzzanti.

Mediaset, Berlusconi's television group, has stated that it uses the same criteria as the public (state-owned) television RAI in assigning a proper visibility to all the most important political parties and movements (the so-called 'Par Condicio') – which has been since often disproved. In March 2006, on the television channel Rai Tre, in a television interview with Lucia Annunziata during his talk show, In 1/2 h, he stormed out of the studio because of a disagreement with the host journalist regarding the economic consequences of his government. In November 2007, allegations of news manipulation caused the departure from RAI of Berlusconi's personal assistant. Enrico Mentana, the news anchor long seen as a guarantor of Canale 5's independence, walked out in April 2008, saying that he no longer felt "at home in a group that seems like an electoral (campaign) committee"

On 24 June 2009, Silvio Berlusconi during the Confindustria young members congress in Santa Margherita Ligure, Italy has invited the advertisers to interrupt or boycott the advertising contracts with the magazines and newspapers published by Gruppo Editoriale L'Espresso, in particular the la Repubblica and the newsmagazine L'espresso, calling the publishing group "shameless", because is fueling the economic crisis speaking more and more about it and accusing also to make a subversive attack against him to replace with an "un-elected". The publishing group has announced to begin legal proceedings against Berlusconi, to protect the image and the interests of the group.

On 12 October 2009, Silvio Berlusconi during the Confindustria Monza and Brianza members congress, has again invited the industrialists present to a "widespread rebellion" against a "newspaper that hadn't any limits in discrediting the government and the country and indoctrinating foreign newspapers". Also in October 2009, Reporters Without Borders secretary-general Jean-François Julliard declared that Berlusconi "is on the verge of being added to our list of Predators of Press Freedom", which would be a first for a European leader. He also added that Italy will probably be ranked last in the European Union in the upcoming edition of the RWB press freedom index.

==== The Economist ====
One of Berlusconi's strongest critics in the media outside Italy is the British weekly The Economist (nicknamed by Berlusconi "The Ecommunist"), which in its issue of 26 April 2001 carried a title on its front cover, 'Why Silvio Berlusconi is unfit to lead Italy'. The war of words between Berlusconi and The Economist has gained notoriety, with Berlusconi taking the publication to court in Rome and The Economist publishing letters against him. The magazine claimed that the documentation contained in its article proves that Berlusconi is 'unfit' for office because of his multiple conflicts of interest. Berlusconi claimed the article contained "a series of old accusations" that was an "insult to truth and intelligence".

According to The Economist's findings, Berlusconi, while Prime Minister of Italy, retained effective control of 90% of all national television broadcasting. This figure included stations he owned directly, as well as those over which he had indirect control by dint of his position as Prime Minister and his ability to influence the choice of the management bodies of these stations. The Economist has also claimed that the Italian Prime Minister is corrupt and self-serving. A key journalist for The Economist, David Lane, has set out a number of these charges in his book Berlusconi's Shadow.

Lane points out that Berlusconi has not defended himself in court against the main charges, but has relied upon political and legal manipulations, most notably by changing the statute of limitation to prevent charges being completed in the first place. In order to publicly prove the truth of the documented accusations contained in their articles, the newspaper has publicly challenged Berlusconi to sue The Economist for libel. Berlusconi did so, losing versus The Economist, and being charged for all the trial costs on 5 September 2008, when the Court in Milan issued a judgment rejecting all Mr Berlusconi's claims and sentenced him to compensate for legal expenses.

In June 2011, The Economist published a strong article dealing with Mr. Berlusconi, titled "The Man who screwed an entire country".

=== Friendship with Bettino Craxi ===
Berlusconi's career as an entrepreneur is also often questioned by his detractors. The allegations made against him generally include suspicions about the extremely fast increase of his activity as a construction entrepreneur in years 1961–1963, hinting at the possibility that in those years he received money from unknown and possibly illegal sources. These accusations are regarded by Berlusconi and his supporters as empty slander, trying to undermine Berlusconi's reputation as a self-made man. Also frequently cited by opponents are events dating to the 1980s, including supposed "favour exchanges" between Berlusconi and Bettino Craxi, the former Socialist prime minister and leader of the Italian Socialist Party convicted in 1994 for various corruption charges. The Milan magistrates who indicted and successfully convicted Mr. Craxi in their "Clean Hands" investigation laid bare an entrenched system in which businessmen paid hundreds of millions of dollars to political parties or individual politicians in exchange for sweetheart deals with Italian state companies and the government itself. Berlusconi acknowledges a personal friendship with Craxi.

=== Legislative changes ===
On some occasions, which raised a strong upheaval in the Italian political opposition, laws passed by the Berlusconi administration have effectively delayed ongoing trials on him. Relevant examples are the law reducing punishment for all cases of false accounting and the law on legitimate suspicion, which allowed defendants to request their cases to be moved to another court if they believe that the local judges are biased against them.^{7, 8} Because of these legislative actions, political opponents accuse Berlusconi of passing these laws for the purpose of protecting himself from legal charges. An enquiry realised by the newspaper La Repubblica sustained that Berlusconi passed 17 different laws which have advantaged himself; Berlusconi and his allies, on the other hand, maintain that such laws are consistent with everyone's right to a rapid and just trial, and with the principle of presumption of innocence (guarantism); furthermore, they claim that Berlusconi is being subjected to a political "witch hunt", orchestrated by certain (allegedly left-wing) judges^{11}.

For such reasons, Berlusconi and his government have an ongoing quarrel with the Italian judiciary, which reached its peak in 2003 when Berlusconi commented to a foreign journalist that judges are "mentally disturbed" and "anthropologically different from the rest of the human race", remarks that he later claimed he meant to be directed to specific judges only, and of a humorous nature^{12}. More seriously, the Berlusconi administration has long been planning a judiciary reform intended to limit the flexibility currently enjoyed by judges and magistrates in their decision-making, but which, according to its critics, will instead limit the magistrature's independence, by de facto subjecting the judiciary to the executive's control. This reform has met almost unanimous dissent from the Italian judges^{13, 14} and, after three years of debate and struggle, was passed by the Italian parliament in December 2004, but was immediately vetoed by the Italian President, Carlo Azeglio Ciampi ^{15}, because of the unconstitutionality of some of the passed laws.

Berlusconi has also been indicted in Spain for charges of tax fraud and violation of anti-trust laws regarding the private television network Telecinco, but his status as a member of the European Parliament allowed him to gain immunity from prosecution until 2005.^{16} All the accused have been acquitted by the Spanish Supreme Court in July 2008.

During the night hours between 5 and 6 March 2010, the Berlusconi-led Italian government passed a decree interpreting the electoral law so as to let the PDL candidate run for governor in Lazio after she had failed to properly register for the elections. The Italian Constitution states that electoral procedures can only be changed in Parliament, and must not be changed by governmental decree. Italy's president, whose endorsement of the decree was required by law, said amid much controversy that the measure taken by the government may not violate the Constitution.

=== Alleged links to the Mafia ===
Berlusconi, in order to solve his problems, has to solve ours.

— Mafia boss Giuseppe Guttadauro in a wiretapped conversation.

Silvio Berlusconi has never been tried on charges relating to Cosa Nostra, although several Mafia turncoats have stated that Berlusconi had connections with the Sicilian criminal association. The claims arise mostly from the hiring of Vittorio Mangano, charged for Mafia association, as a gardener and stable-man at Berlusconi's Villa San Martino in Arcore, a small town near Milan. It was Berlusconi's friend Marcello Dell'Utri who introduced Mangano to Berlusconi in 1973. Berlusconi denied any ties to the Mafia. Marcello Dell'Utri even stated that the Mafia did not exist at all.

In 2004 Dell'Utri, co-founder of Forza Italia, was sentenced to nine years by a Palermo court on charge of "external association to the Mafia", a sentence describing Dell'Utri as a mediator between the economical interests of Berlusconi and members of the criminal organisation. Berlusconi refused to comment on the sentence. In 2010, Palermo's appeals court cut the sentence to seven years but fully confirmed Dell'Utri's role as a link between Berlusconi and the mafia until 1992.

In 1996, a Mafia informer, Salvatore Cancemi, declared that Berlusconi and Dell'Utri were in direct contact with Salvatore Riina, head of the Sicilian Mafia in the 1980s and 90s. Cancemi disclosed that Fininvest, through Marcello Dell'Utri and mafioso Vittorio Mangano, had paid Cosa Nostra 200 million lire (between 100 000 and 200 000 of today's euro) annually. The alleged contacts, according to Cancemi, were to lead to legislation favourable to Cosa Nostra, in particular the harsh 41-bis prison regime. The underlying premise was that Cosa Nostra would support Berlusconi's Forza Italia party in return for political favours. After a two-year investigation, magistrates closed the inquiry without charges. They did not find evidence to corroborate Cancemi's allegations. Similarly, a two-year investigation, also launched on evidence from Cancemi, into Berlusconi's alleged association with the Mafia was closed in 1996.

According to yet another Mafia turncoat, Antonino Giuffrè – arrested on 16 April 2002 – the Mafia turned to Berlusconi's Forza Italia party to look after the Mafia's interests, after the decline in the early 1990s of the ruling Christian Democrat party, whose leaders in Sicily looked after the Mafia's interests in Rome. The Mafia's fall out with the Christian Democrats became clear when Salvo Lima was killed in March 1992. "The Lima murder marked the end of an era," Giuffrè told the court. "A new era opened with a new political force on the horizon which provided the guarantees that the Christian Democrats were no longer able to deliver. To be clear, that party was Forza Italia." Dell'Utri was the go-between on a range of legislative efforts to ease pressure on mafiosi in exchange for electoral support, according to Giuffrè. "Dell'Utri was very close to Cosa Nostra and a very good contact point for Berlusconi," he said. Mafia boss Bernardo Provenzano told Giuffrè that they "were in good hands" with Dell'Utri, who was a "serious and trustworthy person". Provenzano stated that the Mafia's judicial problems would be resolved within 10 years after 1992, thanks to the undertakings given by Forza Italia.

Giuffrè also said that Berlusconi himself used to be in touch with Stefano Bontade, a top Mafia boss, in the mid 1970s. At the time Berlusconi still was just a wealthy real estate developer and started his private television empire. Bontade visited Berlusconi's villa in Arcore through his contact Vittorio Mangano. Berlusconi's lawyer dismissed Giuffrè's testimony as "false" and an attempt to discredit the Prime Minister and his party. Giuffrè said that other Mafia representatives who were in contact with Berlusconi included the Palermo Mafia bosses Filippo Graviano and Giuseppe Graviano. The Graviano brothers allegedly treated directly with Berlusconi through the business-man Gianni Letta, somewhere between September/October 1993. The alleged pact with the Mafia fell apart in 2002. Cosa Nostra had achieved nothing.

Dell'Utri's lawyer, Enrico Trantino, dismissed Giuffrè's allegations as an "anthology of hearsay". He said Giuffrè had perpetuated the trend that every new turncoat would attack Dell'Utri and the former Christian Democrat prime minister Giulio Andreotti in order to earn money and judicial privileges.

In October 2009, Gaspare Spatuzza, a Mafioso turned pentito in 2008, has confirmed Giuffrè statements. Spatuzza testified that his boss Giuseppe Graviano had told him in 1994 that Berlusconi was bargaining with the Mafia, concerning a political-electoral agreement between Cosa Nostra and Berlusconi's Forza Italia. Spatuzza said Graviano disclosed the information to him during a conversation in a bar Graviano owned in the upscale Via Veneto district of the Italian capital Rome. Dell'Utri was the intermediary, according to Spatuzza. Dell'Utri has dismissed Spatuzza's allegations as "nonsense". Berlusconi's lawyer and MP for the PdL, Niccolò Ghedini said that "the statements given by Spatuzza about prime minister Berlusconi are baseless and can be in no way verified."

=== Foreign relations ===
==== Russia ====
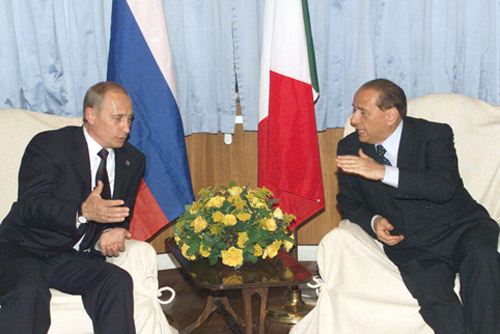
Berlusconi and Vladimir Putin in the 2002 Rome Summit

Berlusconi had a warm relationship with Vladimir Putin.

In November 2007 Italy's state-owned energy company Eni signed an agreement with Russian state-owned Gazprom to build the South Stream pipeline. Investigating Italian parliament members discovered that Central Energy Italian Gas Holding (CEIGH), a part of the Centrex Group, was to play a major role in the lucrative agreement. Bruno Mentasti-Granelli, a close friend of Berlusconi, owned 33 percent of CEIGH. Italian parliament blocked the contract and accused Berlusconi of having a personal interest in the Eni-Gazprom agreement.

On 1 December 2010, Wikileaks leaked American state diplomatic cables showing that American officials voiced concerns over Berlusconi's extraordinary closeness to Putin, "including 'lavish gifts,' lucrative energy contracts and a 'shadowy' Russian-speaking Italian go-between". Diplomats consider him "to be the mouthpiece of Putin" in Europe.

According to one of the leaked cables the Georgian ambassador in Rome has told to the American officials that Georgia believes Putin has promised Berlusconi a percentage of profits from any pipelines developed by Gazprom in coordination with Eni S.p.A.

==== Belarus ====
Berlusconi visited Belarus and met its authoritarian president Alexander Lukashenko in 2009. Berlusconi became the first Western leader to visit Lukashenko since the latter came to power in 1994. In the press conference Berlusconi paid compliments to Lukashenko and said "Good luck to you and your people, whom I know love you".

==== Libya ====
During much of Berlusconi's government Italy gradually reconciled with Libya of Muammar Gaddafi. Italy gets a quarter of its oil and about 10% of its gas from Libya, and enterprises from both countries have strong interests in the other economy. Berlusconi's escort girls helped Gaddafi to gain the leadership of the African Union in 2009. During the first days of the 2011 Libyan civil war Berlusconi was initially cautious, painting Libya not as a military priority but a humanitarian one. In the following days the Italian government condemned the use of violence and suspended the friendship treaty with Libya signed in 2008.

=== Remarks on Western civilisation and Islam ===
After the 11 September 2001 attacks in New York, Berlusconi said: "We must be aware of the superiority of our civilisation, a system that has guaranteed well-being, respect for human rights and – in contrast with Islamic countries – respect for religious and political rights, a system that has as its value understanding of diversity and tolerance." This declaration caused an uproar, not only in the Arab and Muslim world, but also all around Europe, including Italy. Subsequently, Berlusconi told the press: "We are aware of the crucial role of moderate Arab countries... I am sorry that words that have been misunderstood have offended the sensitivity of my Arab and Muslim friends."

=== Right-to-die case ===
After the family of Eluana Englaro (who had been comatose for 17 years) succeeded in having her right to die recognised by the judges and getting doctors to start the process of allowing her to die in the way established by the court, Berlusconi issued a decree to stop the doctor from letting her die. Stating that, "This is murder. I would be failing to rescue her. I'm not a Pontius Pilate", Berlusconi went on to defend his decision by claiming that she was "in the condition to have babies", arguing that comatose women were still subject to menstruation. Critics said that this controversial move had been staged to repair relations with the Vatican.

=== Jokes, gestures, and blunders ===
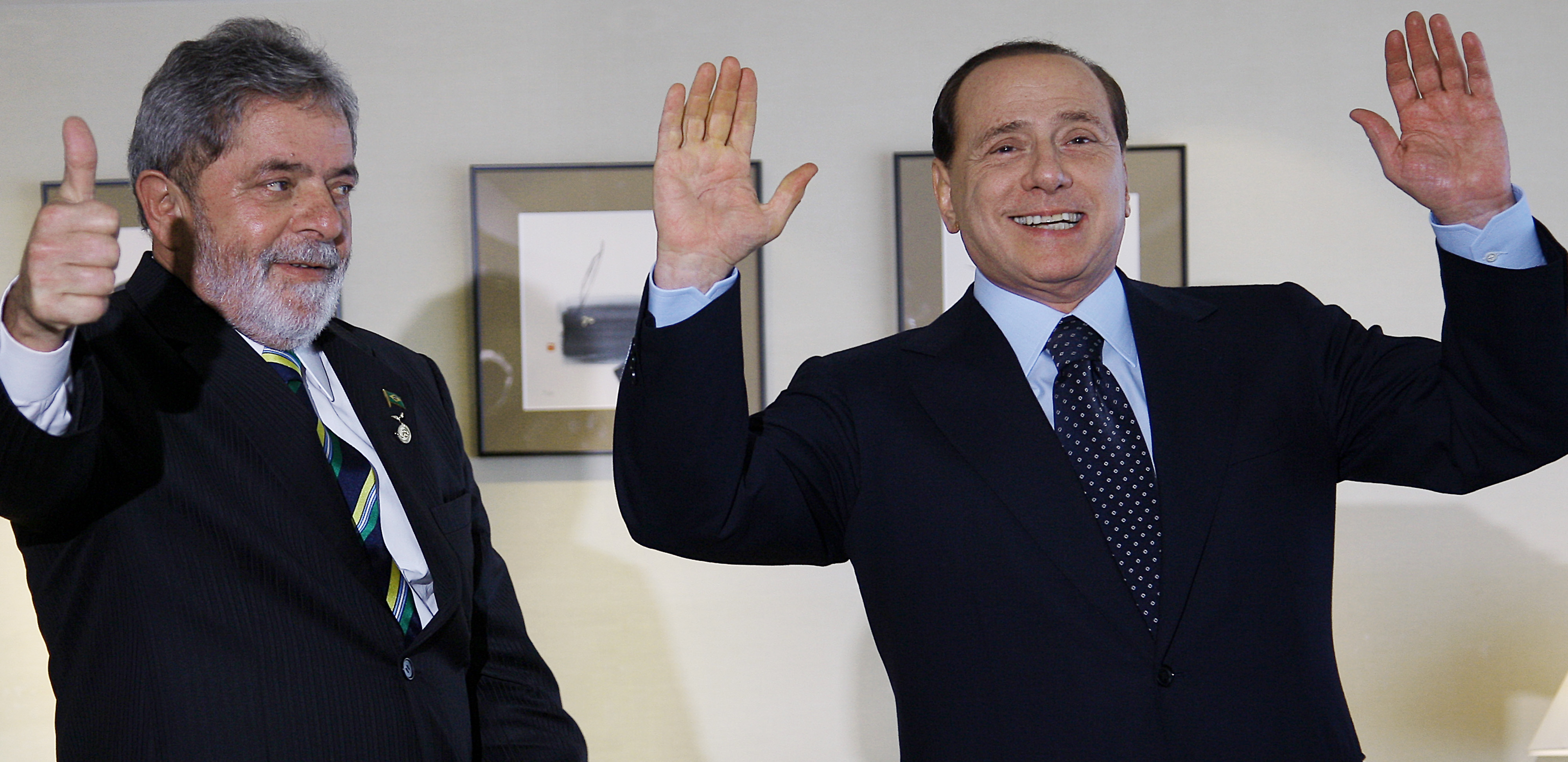
Berlusconi with the president of Brazil Luiz Inácio Lula da Silva

Berlusconi has developed a reputation for making gaffes or insensitive remarks.

On 2 July 2003, Berlusconi suggested that German SPD MEP Martin Schulz, who had criticised his domestic policies, should play a Nazi concentration camp guard in a film. Berlusconi insisted that he was joking, but accused Schulz and others to be "bad-willing tourists of democracy". This incident caused a brief cooling of Italy's relationship with Germany.

Addressing traders at the New York Stock Exchange in September 2003, Berlusconi listed a series of reasons to invest in Italy, the first of which was that "we have the most beautiful secretaries in the world". This remark resulted in uproar in Italy where female members of parliament took part in a one-day cross-party protest. Berlusconi's list also included the claim that Italy had "fewer communists, and those who are still here deny having been one".

In 2003, during an interview with Nicholas Farrell, then editor of The Spectator, Berlusconi claimed that Mussolini "had been a benign dictator who did not murder opponents but sent them 'on holiday'".

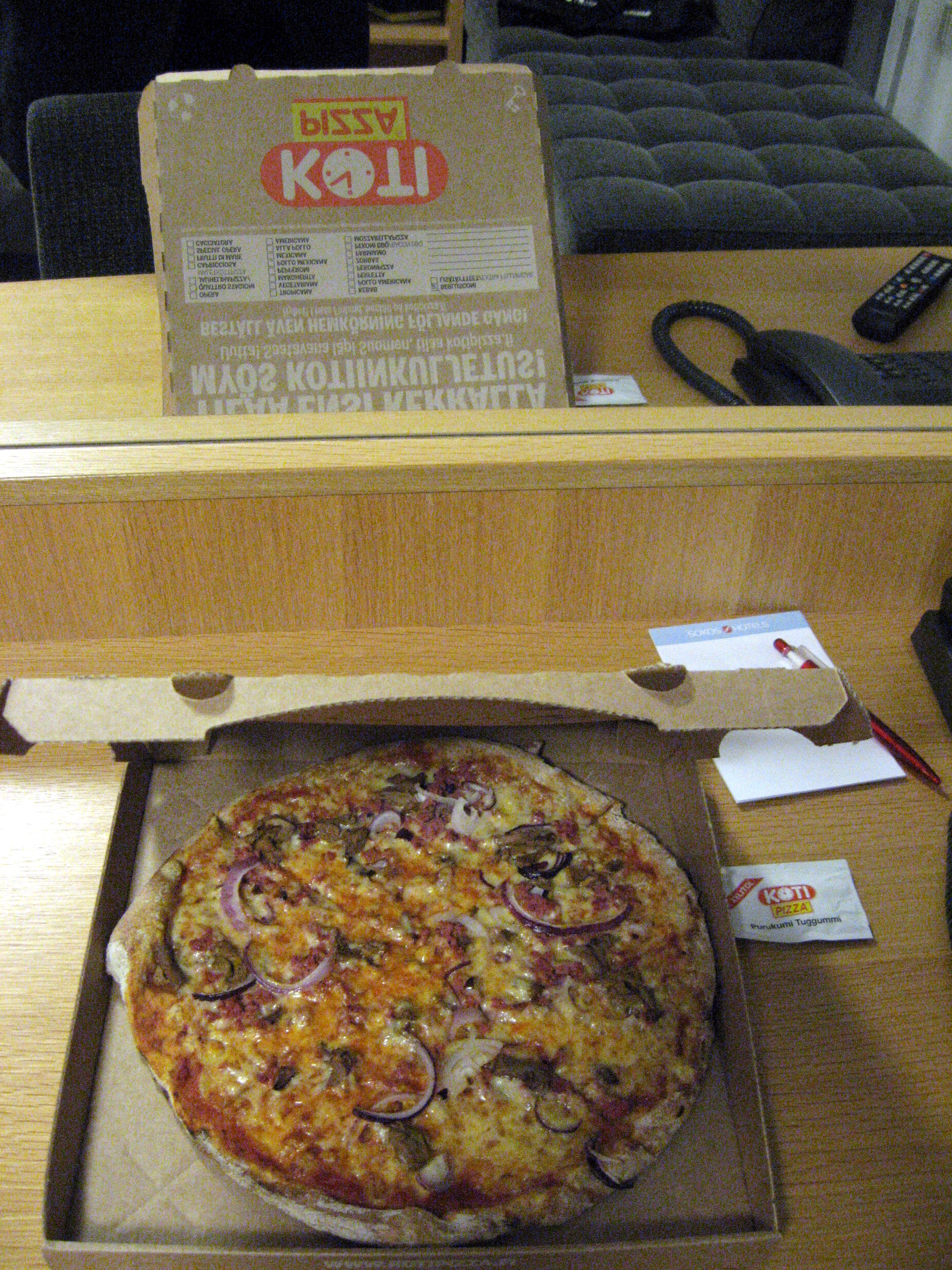
Kotipizza Pizza Berlusconi

Berlusconi had made disparaging remarks about Finnish cuisine during negotiations to decide on the location of the European Food Safety Authority in 2001. He caused further offence in 2005, when he claimed that during the negotiations he had had to "dust off his playboy charms" in order to persuade the Finnish president, Tarja Halonen, to concede that the EFSA should be based in Parma instead of Finland, and compared Finnish smoked reindeer unfavourably to culatello. The Italian ambassador in Helsinki was summoned by the Finnish foreign minister. One of Berlusconi's ministers later 'explained' the comment by saying that "anyone who had seen a picture of Halonen must have been aware that he had been joking". Halonen took the incident in good humour, retorting that Berlusconi had "overestimated his persuasion skills". The Finnish pizza chain Kotipizza responded by launching a variety of pizza called Pizza Berlusconi, using smoked reindeer as the topping. The pizza won first prize in America's Plate International pizza contest in March 2008.

In March 2006, Berlusconi alleged that Chinese communists under Mao Zedong had "boiled [children] to fertilise the fields". His opponent Romano Prodi criticised Berlusconi for offending the Chinese people and called his comments 'unthinkable'.

In the run-up to the 2008 Italian general election, Berlusconi was angrily accused of sexism for saying that female politicians from the right were "more beautiful" and that "the left has no taste, even when it comes to women". In 2008 Berlusconi criticised the composition of the Council of Ministers of the Spanish Government as being too 'pink' by virtue of the fact that it has (once the president of the council, José Luis Rodríguez Zapatero, is counted) an equal number of men and women. He also stated that he doubted that such a composition would be possible in Italy given the "prevalence of men" in Italian politics.

Also in 2008 Berlusconi caused controversy at a joint press conference with Russian president Vladimir Putin. When Russian journalist Nezavisimaya Gazeta asked a question about Mr. Putin's personal relationships, Berlusconi made a gesture towards the journalist imitating a gunman shooting.

On 6 November 2008, two days after Barack Obama was elected the first black US president, Berlusconi referred to Obama as "young, handsome and even tanned": On 26 March 2009 he said "I'm paler [than Mr. Obama], because it's been so long since I went sunbathing. He's more handsome, younger and taller."

On 24 January 2009, Berlusconi announced his aim to increase the numbers of military patrolling the Italian cities from 3,000 to 30,000 in order to crack down on what he called an "evil army" of criminals. Responding to a female journalist who asked him if this tenfold increase in patrolling soldiers would be enough to secure Italian women from being raped, he said: "We could not field a big enough force to avoid this risk [of rape]. We would need as many soldiers as beautiful women and I don't think that would be possible, because our women are so beautiful." Opposition leaders called the remarks insensitive and in bad taste. Berlusconi retorted that he had merely wanted to compliment Italian women. Other critics accused him of creating a "police state".

On 3 April 2009, Berlusconi appeared to have annoyed Queen Elizabeth II at a photo session during the G20 summit. During the photo session, Berlusconi shouted "Mr. Obama, Mr. Obama", prompting her to turn around and chastise Berlusconi, "What is it? Why does he have to shout?". The following day, at the NATO meeting in Kehl, Berlusconi was seen talking on his mobile phone, while Merkel and other NATO leaders waited for him for a photo on a Rhine bridge (afterwards, Berlusconi claimed he was talking to Turkish Prime Minister Recep Tayyip Erdoğan about accepting the Secretary Generalship of Anders Fogh Rasmussen). Responding to the Italian media's reaction to these incidents, he said he was considering "hard measures" against reporters, and referred to some of their claims as "slander".

Two days after the 2009 L'Aquila earthquake, Berlusconi suggested that people left homeless should view their experience as a camping weekend.

In May 2009, Berlusconi alleged that he had once had to travel three hours to see a two-hundred-year-old church in the Finnish countryside which, in his opinion, would have been demolished if it was in Italy. Berlusconi had made a non-official visit to Finland in 1999 and had never seen any Finnish church, but had just been visiting Iceland.

In October 2010, Berlusconi was chastised by the Vatican newspaper L'Osservatore Romano after he was filmed telling "offensive and deplorable jokes", including one whose punchline was similar to one of the gravest blasphemies in the Italian language. It was also revealed he had made another anti-Semitic joke a few days previously. Berlusconi responded to the allegations by saying the jokes were "neither an offence nor a sin, but merely a laugh".

On 1 November 2010, after once again being accused of involvement in juvenile prostitution, he suggested that an audience at the Milan trade fair should stop reading newspapers: "Don't read newspapers any more because they deceive you. [...] I am a man who works hard all day long and if sometimes I look at some good-looking girl, it's better to be fond of pretty girls than to be gay". The remarks were immediately condemned by Arcigay, Italy's main gay rights organisation, on behalf of both women and gay people; speaking on behalf of the organisation, its president Paolo Patanè said that it was "unacceptable for a head of government to foster a chauvinistic and vulgar attitude" with such a statement, and requested that Berlusconi apologise. Politicians including Nichi Vendola, Antonio Di Pietro, and Franco Grillini released similar statements, with the latter commenting that it was "better to be gay than to be a sex-addicted schemer like Berlusconi." Flavia Madaschi, president of Agedo, the Italian equivalent of PFLAG, also commented that it was "better to be gay than Berlusconi." Activists staged an anti-homophobia protest outside Palazzo Chigi.

On 13 July 2011, according to a leaked telephone surveillance transcript, Berlusconi told his presumed blackmailer Valter Lavitola: "The only thing they can say about me is that I screw around [...] Now they're spying on me, controlling my phone calls. I don't give a fuck. In a few months [...] I'll be leaving this shit country that makes me sick." He had already made a comment about sending a postcard from the Bahamas in 2005.

On 12 February 2023, in the midst of the ongoing Russian invasion of Ukraine, Berlusconi stated that he "wouldn't have spoken with Zelensky if I were Prime Minister because as you know we are looking at the devastation of his country and the massacre of his soldiers and civilians: he could have stopped attacking the two autonomous republics of the Donbas and this would not have happened, therefore I judge very, very negatively the behaviour of this man". The government of Italy responded that its support for Ukraine is "solid and unwavering".

=== Assault at rally ===
On 13 December 2009 Berlusconi was hit in the face with an alabaster statuette of Milan Cathedral after a rally in Milan's Piazza del Duomo. As Berlusconi was shaking hands with the public, a man in the crowd stepped forward and launched the statuette at him. The assailant was subsequently detained and identified as Massimo Tartaglia, a 42-year-old surveyor with a history of mental illness but no criminal record, living in the outskirts of Milan. According to a letter released to the Italian news agency ANSA, Tartaglia has apologised for the attack, writing: "I don't recognise myself", and adding that he had "acted alone [with no] form of militancy or political affiliation". Berlusconi suffered facial injuries, a broken nose and two broken teeth; he was subsequently hospitalised. Italian president Giorgio Napolitano and politicians from all parties in Italy condemned the attack.

In the night of 15–16 December a 26-year-old man was stopped by police and Berlusconi's bodyguards while trying to gain access to Berlusconi's hospital room. A search revealed that he carried no weapons, although three hockey sticks and two knives were later found in his car. The suspect was known to have a history of mental illness and mandatory treatment in mental institutions.

Berlusconi was discharged from the hospital on 17 December 2009.

== Sexual scandals ==
=== Wiretaps and accusations of corruption ===
In December 2007 the audio recording of a phone call between Berlusconi, then leader of the opposition parties, and Agostino Saccà (general director of RAI) were published by the magazine L'espresso and caused a scandal in several media. The wiretap was part of an investigation by the Public Prosecutor Office of Naples, where Berlusconi was investigated for corruption. In the phone call, Saccà expresses words of impassioned political support to Berlusconi and criticises the behaviour of Berlusconi's allies. Berlusconi urges Saccà to broadcast a telefilm series which was advocated by his ally Umberto Bossi. Saccà laments that a number of people have spread rumours on this agreement causing problems to him. Then Berlusconi asks Saccà to find a job in RAI for a young woman explicitly telling him that this woman would serve as an asset in a secret exchange with a senator of the majority who would help him to cause Prodi, with his administration, to fall. After the publication of these wiretaps, Berlusconi has been accused by other politicians and by some journalists of political corruption through the exploitation of prostitution. Berlusconi said, in his own defence: "In the entertainment world everybody knows that, in certain situations in RAI TV you work only if you prostitute yourself or if you are leftist. I have intervened on behalf of some personalities who are not leftists and have been completely set apart by RAI TV." In the US State Department's 2011 Trafficking in Persons report authorized by Secretary of State Hillary Clinton, Mr. Berlusconi was explicitly named as a person involved in the "commercial sexual exploitation of a Moroccan child".

=== Prostitution scandal and divorce ===
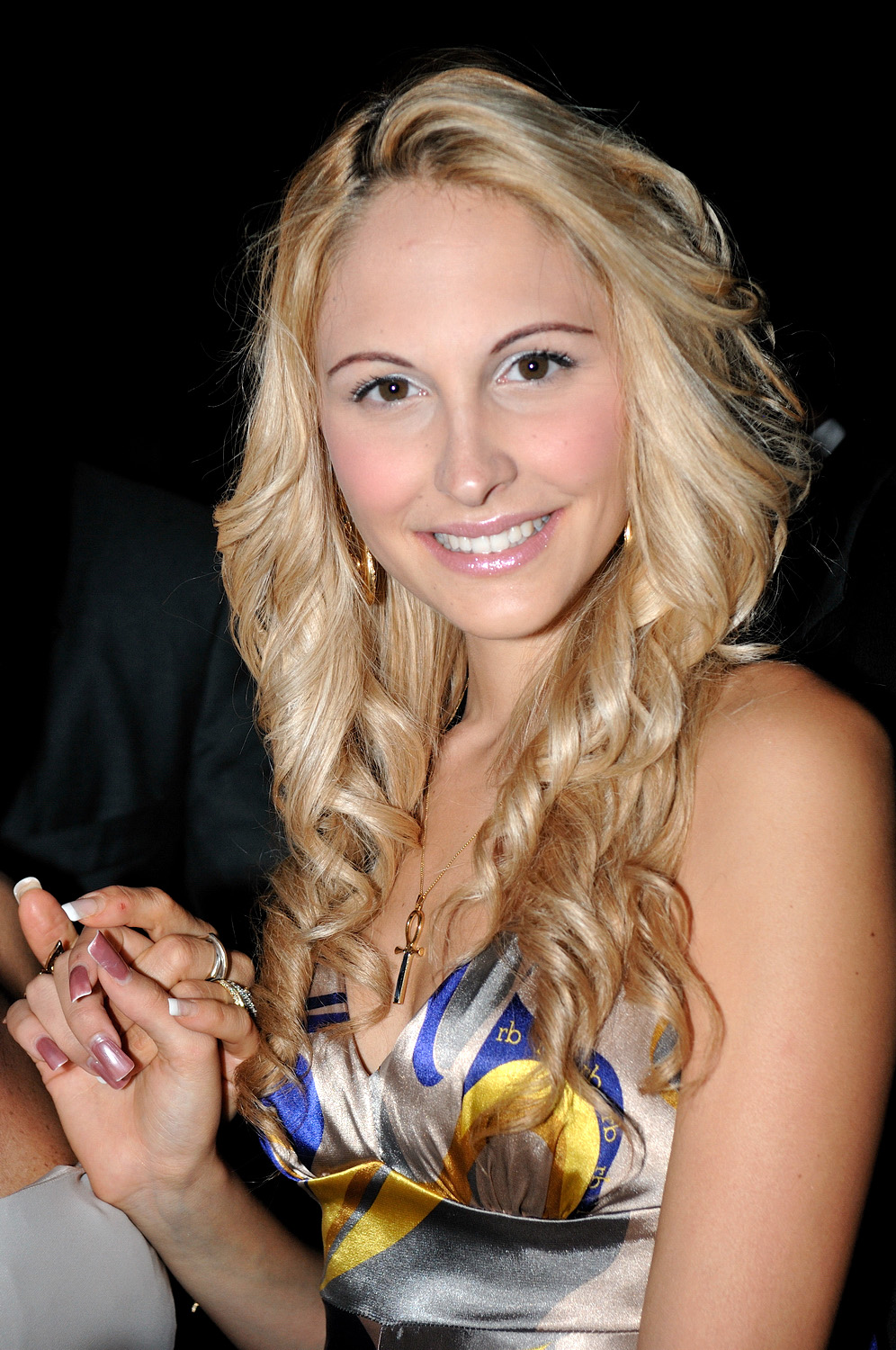
Noemi Letizia at the 2009 Venice Film Festival

In late April 2009, Veronica Lario wrote an open letter expressing her anger at Berlusconi's choice of young, attractive female candidates—some with little or no political experience—to represent the party in the 2009 European Parliament elections. Berlusconi demanded a public apology, claiming that for the third time his wife had "done this to me in the middle of an election campaign", and stated that there was little prospect of his marriage continuing. On 3 May, Veronica Lario announced she was filing for divorce following her husband's attendance at a girl's 18th birthday party in Casoria, Naples. She claimed that Berlusconi had not attended his own sons' 18th birthday parties, and that she "cannot remain with a man who consorts with minors" and "is not well". Noemi Letizia, the girl in question, gave interviews to the Italian press, revealing that she calls Berlusconi "papi" ("daddy"), that they often spent time together in the past, and that Berlusconi would take care of her career as showgirl or politician, whichever she opted to pursue.

In the following days Silvio Berlusconi gave explanations about the incident to press and television, swearing that he knew the girl only through her father and that he never met her alone without her parents. However, on 14 May, newspaper la Repubblica published an article showing the inconsistencies and contradictions arisen so far and formally asking Berlusconi to answer ten questions in order to clarify the situation.

Ten days later, Letizia's ex-boyfriend Luigi Flaminio claimed that Berlusconi had contacted the girl personally in October 2008, impressed by her "purity" and "angelic face" after seeing pictures of her in a photobook, brought to him by the journalist Emilio Fede (director of TG4). Flaminio also mentioned that she had spent a week without her parents at Berlusconi's Sardinian villa around New Year's Eve 2009, a fact confirmed later by her mother. Photographs of the event taken by a paparazzo were confiscated by the Prosecutor's Office of Rome for violation of privacy but a selection of those photos was published in El País on 4 June.

On 28 May 2009, Silvio Berlusconi said that he had never had "spicy" relations with Noemi Letizia, swearing also on his children's heads. He said also that if any such thing had occurred, he would have resigned immediately.

On 17 June 2009, Patrizia D'Addario, a 42-year old escort and retired actress from Bari, Italy, claimed that she had been recruited twice (by a mutual friend, who paid her 2000 Euros) in order to spend the evening, and once also the night, with Berlusconi. Magistrates in Bari are investigating this case, since the friend could be prosecuted for favouring prostitution.

Silvio Berlusconi denied any knowledge of D'Addario being a paid escort: "I have never paid a woman... I have never understood what satisfaction there is if the pleasure of conquest is absent". He also accused an unspecified person of manoeuvring and paying D'Addario (accusations which she vehemently denied).

Other young women have also described to the press the parties held in Berlusconi's Rome residence (Palazzo Grazioli), while photos and transcripts of audio cassettes circulated widely in the press. These descriptions have raised, in particular, concerns about the lack of security measures and the uncontrolled access to the prime minister's residence.

On 26 June 2009, the "10 questions" to Berlusconi were reformulated by la Repubblica newspaper, and then frequently republished on it. No answers were given, until 28 August 2009, when Berlusconi sued Gruppo Editoriale L'Espresso, the owner company of the newspaper, and defined these ten questions as "defamatory" and "rhetorical".

Berlusconi's lifestyle has raised eyebrows in Catholic circles, with vigorous criticism being expressed in particular by the newspaper Avvenire, owned by the Conferenza Episcopale Italiana (Conference of Italian Bishops). This was followed by the publication in the newspaper il Giornale (owned by the Berlusconi family) of details with regard to legal proceedings against the editor of Avvenire, Dino Boffo, which seemed to implicate him for a harassment case against the wife of his ex-partner. Dino Boffo has always declared the details of the proceedings to be false, although he has not denied the basic premise.

After a period of tense exchanges and polemics, on 3 September 2009, Boffo resigned from his editorial position and the assistant editor Marco Tarquinio became editor ad interim.

On 22 September 2009, after a press conference, Silvio Berlusconi declared that he had asked his ministers not to respond anymore to questions regarding "gossip". He stated also that the Italian press should talk only about the "successes" of Italian Government in internal and foreign policies, adding also that the press now will be able only to ask questions such as "how many apartments will be given in L'Aquila", i.e. relating to his administration and not to gossip.

During a contested episode of AnnoZero on 1 October 2009, the journalist and presenter Michele Santoro interviewed Patrizia D'Addario. She stated she was contacted by Giampaolo Tarantini – a businessman from Bari – who already knew her and requested her presence at Palazzo Grazioli with "the President". D'Addario also stated that Berlusconi knew that she was a paid escort.

=== Ruby Rubacuori ===
In November 2010, teenage Moroccan belly dancer and alleged prostitute Karima El Mahroug (better known as "Ruby Rubacuori") claimed to have been given $10,000 by Berlusconi at parties at his private villas. The girl told prosecutors in Milan that these events were like orgies where Berlusconi and 20 young women performed an African-style ritual known as the "bunga bunga" in the nude. It was also found out that, on 27 May 2010, El Mahroug had been arrested for theft by the Milan police but (being still a minor) she was directed to a shelter for juvenile offenders. However, following two telephone calls by Berlusconi to the police authorities (in which, in particular, he falsely indicated that El Mahroug was a close relative of President Hosni Mubarak of Egypt), the young woman was released and entrusted to the care of PDL regional counselor (and Berlusconi's personal dental hygienist) Nicole Minetti. The investigation of Berlusconi for extortion (it:concussione) and child prostitution regarding Karima El Mahroug has been referred to as "Rubygate". MP Gaetano Pecorella proposed to lower the age of majority in Italy to solve the case.

Berlusconi has also come under fire for reportedly spending $1.8 million in state funds from Rai Cinema to further the career of a largely unknown Bulgarian actress, Michelle Bonev. The fact that this coincided with severe cuts being made to the country's arts budget provoked a strong reaction from the public.

On 24 June 2013, Berlusconi was convicted for paying for sex with Karima El Mahroug and sentenced to seven years in prison, although his sentence will not start until after the appeal process is concluded.

On 1 March 2019, the Moroccan model Imane Fadil, who was one of the main witnesses in the trial, died in strange circumstances. The Italian news agency ANSA said a toxicology test had found that she had been killed by a "mix of radioactive substances". She was found to have had abnormally high levels of heavy metals in her body when she died in agony. Although this was initially investigated as a murder investigation, no formal charges have yet been made. In addition, in 2021, the clinic where she was treated was investigated for medical malpractice related to her death. However, this investigation suggested she died of natural causes, specifically medullary aplasia.

== See also ==
- Silvio Berlusconi
- Trials and allegations involving Silvio Berlusconi
- Political career of Silvio Berlusconi
- Policies of Silvio Berlusconi
- Resignation of Silvio Berlusconi
