= Bongo Bongo =

Bongo Bongo or Bongo-Bongo may refer to:

- Bongo-Bongo (linguistics), an imaginary placeholder language
- Bongo Bongo Land, a British English pejorative term
- "Bongo Bongo Bongo I Don't Want to Leave the Congo", an alternative name for the 1947 song "Civilization"
- "Bongo Bong", a single by Manu Chao from the 2000 album Clandestino
