= Freedom Army =

Freedom Army Esercito della Libertà
- Leader: Simone Furlan
- Founded: 2013
- Membership (2013): 75,000
- Ideology: Anti-communism; Berlusconism
- Political position: Right-wing

Website
- esercitodellaliberta.it

The Freedom Army (Esercito della Libertà) or Silvio's Army (Esercito di Silvio) is a wing of Forza Italia. On 28 April 2013, the four-time Prime Minister Silvio Berlusconi and his entourage launched an online initiative, which consisted in the recruitment of volunteers, who are available to defend Berlusconi from the convictions of Milan's prosecutors, who are dealing with his trials, and whom Berlusconi often accused of being communists and anti-democratic.

Simone Furlan, the creator of the Freedom Army, said in an interview: "There comes a time in life, when you realize that fighting for an ideal is no longer a choice but an obligation. We civil society we were helpless spectators of the 'War of the Twenty Years' which saw Silvio Berlusconi fight and defend against slanderous accusations of all kinds, the result of a judicial persecution without precedent in history." This initiative was condemned by the Democratic Party, the Five Star Movement and Left Ecology Freedom.
