= Anedda =

Anedda is a surname. Notable people with the surname include:

- Antonella Anedda (born 1955), Italian poet and essayist
- Gian Franco Anedda (1930–2020), Italian politician
- Giuseppe Anedda (1912–1997), Italian mandolin virtuoso
