= Sabina Beganović =

German actress

- Born: 1974 or 1975 (age 51–52); Hamburg, Germany
- Other name: Sebina Began
- Years active: 1996–present
- Known for: Affair with former Italian Prime Minister Silvio Berlusconi

Sabina Beganović, also known as Sebina Began, is a German actress of Bosnian descent, who resides in Italy. She is an ex-lover of the former Italian Prime Minister Silvio Berlusconi. In an interview with Sky Italia, Began offered one of several explanations for the origin of the controversial term bunga bunga, linked to the sex scandal involving Berlusconi, stating that the term is based on her nickname. In 2015, Began was sentenced to 16 months for recruiting prostitutes to attend parties at Berlusconi's mansions.

== Filmography ==
- Il falco e la colomba (TV series; 2009)
- Il caso dell'infedele Klara (2009)
- Il mistero del lago (TV movie; 2009)
- Crociera Vianello (TV movie; 2008)
- Go Go Tales (2007)
- Don Matteo (TV series; 2006)
- Provaci ancora prof! (TV series; 2005)
- Un papà quasi perfetto (TV mini-series; 2003)
- Malefemmene (2001)
- Aitanic (2000)
- Chiavi in mano (1996)
