= Political career of Silvio Berlusconi =

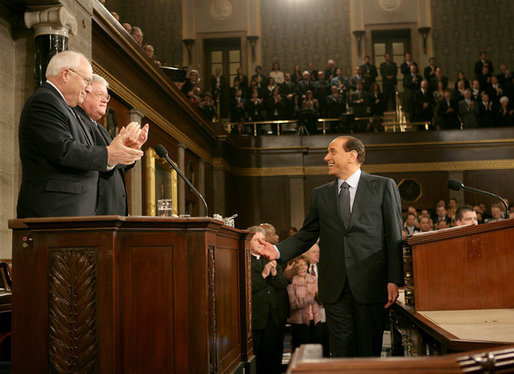
Berlusconi addressing a joint session of the U.S. Congress in 2006

The political career of Silvio Berlusconi (1994–2011) began in 1994, when Berlusconi entered politics for the first time serving intermittent terms as Prime Minister of Italy from 1994 to 1995, 2001 to 2006 and 2008 to 2011, his career was racked with controversies and trials; amongst these was his failure to honour his promise to sell his personal assets in Mediaset, the largest television broadcaster network in Italy, in order to dispel any perceived conflicts of interest.

== Political career ==
In the early 1990s, the five pro-Western governing parties, Christian Democracy (Democrazia Cristiana), the Italian Socialist Party, the Italian Social-Democratic Party, the Italian Republican Party and the Italian Liberal Party, lost much of their electoral strength almost overnight due to a large number of judicial investigations concerning the financial corruption of many of their foremost members (see the Mani Pulite affair). This led to a general expectation that upcoming elections would be won by the Democratic Party of the Left, the heirs to the former Italian Communist Party, and their Alliance of Progressives coalition unless there was an alternative. On 26 January 1994, Berlusconi announced his decision to "enter the field", presenting his own political party, Forza Italia, on a platform focused on protecting Italy from "the Communists". His political aim was to convince the voters of the Pentapartito, (i.e. the usual five governing parties) who were shocked and confused by Mani Pulite scandals, that Forza Italia offered both novelty and the continuation of the pro-western free market policies followed by Italy since the end of the 2nd World War. Shortly after he decided to enter the political arena, investigators into the Mani Pulite affair were said to be close to issuing warrants for the arrest of Berlusconi and senior executives of his business group. During his years of political career Berlusconi has maintained that the Mani Pulite investigations were led by communist prosecutors who wanted to establish a soviet-style government in Italy.

=== 1994 general election ===
In order to win the March 1994 general election Berlusconi formed two separate electoral alliances: Pole of Freedoms (Polo delle Libertà) with the Lega Nord (Northern League) in northern Italian districts, and another, the Pole of Good Government (Polo del Buon Governo), with the post-fascist National Alliance (Alleanza Nazionale; heir to the Italian Social Movement) in central and southern regions. In a shrewd pragmatic move, he did not ally with the latter in the North because the League disliked them. As a result, Forza Italia was allied with two parties that were not allied with each other.

Berlusconi launched a massive campaign of electoral advertisements on his three TV networks. He subsequently won the elections, with Forza Italia garnering 21% of the popular vote, the highest percentage of any single party. One of the most significant promises that he made in order to secure victory was that his government would create "one million more jobs". He was appointed prime minister in 1994, but his term in office was short because of the inherent contradictions in his coalition: the League, a regional party with a strong electoral base in northern Italy, was at that time fluctuating between federalist and separatist positions, and the National Alliance was a nationalist party that had yet to renounce neo-fascism at the time.

=== Fall of the Berlusconi I Cabinet ===
In December 1994, following the communication of a new investigation from Milan magistrates that was leaked to the press, Umberto Bossi, leader of the Lega Nord, left the coalition claiming that the electoral pact had not been respected, forcing Berlusconi to resign from office and shifting the majority's weight to the centre-left side. Lega Nord also resented the fact that many of its MPs had switched to Forza Italia, allegedly lured by promises of more prestigious portfolios. In 1998 various articles attacking Berlusconi were published by Lega Nord's official newspaper (www.lapadania.it), with titles such as "La Fininvest è nata da Cosa Nostra" – "Fininvest (Berlusconi's principal company) was founded by the Mafia".

Berlusconi remained as prime minister for a little over a month until his replacement by a technocratic government headed by Lamberto Dini. Dini had been a key minister in the Berlusconi cabinet, and Berlusconi said the only way he would support a technocratic government would be if Dini was in charge. In the end, however, Dini was only supported by most opposition parties but not by Forza Italia. In 1996, Berlusconi and his coalition lost the election and was replaced by a centre-left government led by Romano Prodi.

=== 2001 general election ===
In 2001, Berlusconi again ran as leader of the centre-right coalition House of Freedoms (Italian: La Casa delle Libertà), which included the Union of Christian and Centre Democrats, the Lega Nord, the National Alliance and other parties. Berlusconi's success at the 2001 general election led to him becoming Prime Minister once more, with the coalition receiving 45.4% of the vote for the Chamber of Deputies and 42.5% for the Senate.

On the television programme Porta a Porta, during the last days of the electoral campaign, Berlusconi created a powerful impression on the public by undertaking to sign a Contratto con gli Italiani (English: Contract with the Italians), an idea apparently conceived by his advisor Luigi Crespi and inspired by Newt Gingrich's Contract with America introduced six weeks before the 1994 US Congressional election, which was widely considered to be a creative masterstroke in his 2001 campaign bid for election. In this solemn agreement, Berlusconi claimed his commitment on improving several aspects of the Italian economy and standards of living. Firstly, he undertook to simplify the complex tax system by introducing just two tax rates (33% for those earning over €100,000, and 23% for anyone earning less than that figure: anyone earning less than €11,000 per annum would not be taxed); secondly, he promised to halve the unemployment rate; thirdly, he undertook to finance and develop a massive new public works programme. In addition, Berlusconi promised to raise the minimum monthly pension rate to €516; and that he would suppress the crime wave by introducing police officers to patrol all local zones and areas in Italy's major cities. Berlusconi undertook to refrain from putting himself up for re-election in 2006 if he failed to honour at least four of these five promises.

=== Berlusconi II Cabinet ===
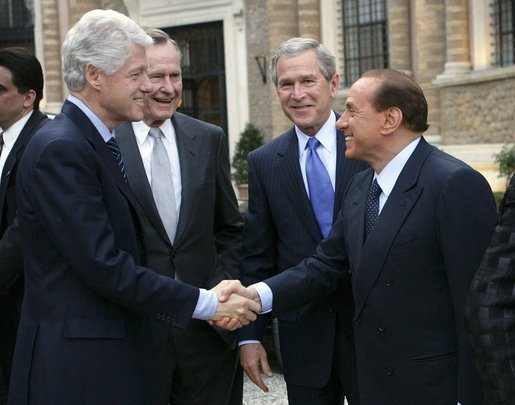
From left to right: Bill Clinton, George H. W. Bush, George W. Bush and Silvio Berlusconi.

Opposition parties claim Berlusconi was not able to achieve the goals he promised in his Contratto con gli Italiani. Some of his partners in government, especially the National Alliance and the Union of Christian and Centre Democrats have admitted the Government fell short of the promises made in the agreement, attributing the failure to an unforeseeable downturn in global economic conditions. Berlusconi himself has consistently asserted that he achieved all the goals of the agreement, and said his Government provided un miracolo continuo (a continuous miracle) that made all 'earlier governments pale' (by comparison). He attributed the widespread failure to recognise these achievements to a campaign of mystification and vilification in the printed media, asserting that 85% of newspapers were opposed to him. Luca Ricolfi, an independent analyst, held that Berlusconi had managed to maintain only one promise out of five, the one concerning minimum pension levels. The other four promises were not, in Luca Ricolfi's view, honoured. In particular, the undertakings on the tax simplification and the reduction of crime.

=== 2003 local elections ===
House of Freedoms did not do as well in the 2003 local elections as it did at the 2001 election. In common with many other European governing groups, at the 2004 election of the European Parliament, gaining 43.37% support. Forza Italia's support was also reduced from 29.5% to 21.0% (at the 1999 European election, Forza Italia had 25.2%). As an outcome of these results the other coalition parties, whose electoral results were more satisfactory, asked Berlusconi and Forza Italia for greater influence in the government's political line.

=== Berlusconi III Cabinet ===
At the 2005 regional election, (3 April/4 April 2005), the centre-left gubernatorial candidates won in 12 out of 14 regions where control of local governments and governorships was at stake. Berlusconi's coalition kept only two of the regional bodies (Lombardy and Veneto) up for re-election. Three parties, Union of Christian and Centre Democrats, National Alliance and New Italian Socialist Party, threatened to withdraw from the Berlusconi government. The Italian premier, after some hesitation, then presented to the president of the republic a request for the dissolution of his government on 20 April 2005. On 23 April he formed a new government with the same allies, reshuffling ministers and amending the government programme. A key point required by the Union of Christian and Centre Democrats (and to a lesser extent by National Alliance) for their continued support was that the strong focus on tax reduction central to the government's ambitions be changed.

=== 2006 general election ===
Operating under a new electoral law written unilaterally by the governing parties over strong criticism from the parliamentary opposition the April 2006 general election was held. The results of this election handed Romano Prodi's centre-left coalition, known as The Union, (Berlusconi's opposition) a very thin majority: 49.8% against 49.7% for the centre-right coalition House of Freedoms in the Lower House and a two-senator lead in the Senate (158 senators for The Union and 156 for the House of Freedoms). The Court of Cassation has subsequently validated the voting procedures and determined that the election process was constitutional.

According to the new electoral rules, The Union, (nicknamed "The Soviet Union" by Silvio Berlusconi) with a margin of only 25,224 votes (out of over 38 million voters), nevertheless won 348 seats (compared to 281 for the House of Freedoms) in the lower house as a result of a majority premium given to whichever coalition of parties was awarded more votes.
Ironically, the same electoral law that Berlusconi's coalition had approved shortly before the election in order to win the election, caused his defeat and gave Prodi the chance to form a new cabinet. However Prodi's coalition consisted of a large number of smaller parties. If only one of the nine parties forming The Union withdrew its support to Prodi, his government would have collapsed. This situation was also the result of the new "diabolic" electoral system.

Centrist parties such as the Union of Christian and Centre Democrats immediately conceded The Union's victory, while other parties, like Berlusconi's Forza Italia and the Northern League, refused to accept its validity, right up until 2 May 2006, when Berlusconi submitted his resignation to President Ciampi.

=== "Running board revolution": 2008 electoral victory and formation of a new party ===
Following the run-up to the 2006 general election there had been talk among some of the components of the House of Freedoms regarding a possible merger into a "united party of moderates and reformers". Forza Italia, the National Alliance party of Gianfranco Fini, and the Union of Christian and Centre Democrats of Pier Ferdinando Casini all seemed interested in the project. Soon after the election, however, Casini started to distance his party from its historical allies.

On 2 December 2006, during a major demonstration of the centre-right in Rome against the government led by Romano Prodi, Silvio Berlusconi proposed the foundation of a "Freedom Party", stressing that the people and the voters of the different political movements adhering to the demonstration were all part of a "people of freedom".

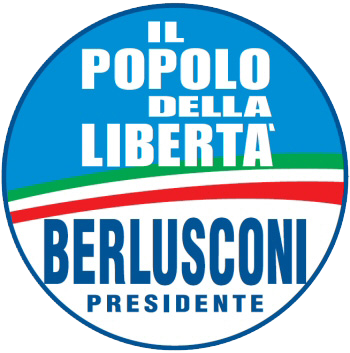
The People of Freedom

On 18 November 2007, after claiming the collection of more than seven million signatures (including Umberto Bossi's) demanding the president of the republic Giorgio Napolitano to call a fresh election, Silvio Berlusconi announced from the running board of a car in a crowded Piazza San Babila in Milan that Forza Italia would have soon merged or transformed into The People of Freedom party. Berlusconi also stated that this new political movement could see the participation of other parties. Both supporters and critics of the new party called Berlusconi's announcement "the running board revolution".

After the sudden fall of the Prodi II Cabinet on 24 January, the break-up of The Union coalition and the subsequent political crisis (which paved the way for a fresh general election in April 2008), Berlusconi, Gianfranco Fini and other party leaders finally agreed on 8 February 2008 to form a joint list named The People of Freedom (Italian: Il Popolo della Libertà), allied with the Northern League of Umberto Bossi and with the Sicilian Movement for Autonomy of Raffaele Lombardo.

In the snap parliamentary election held on 13/14 April 2008 this coalition won against Walter Veltroni's centre-left coalition in both houses of the Italian Parliament.

In the 315-member Senate of the Republic, Berlusconi's coalition won 174 seats to Veltroni's 134. In the lower house, Berlusconi's conservative bloc led by a margin of 9% of the vote: 46.5% (344 seats) to 37.5% (246 seats). Berlusconi capitalised on discontent over the nation's stagnating economy and the unpopularity of Prodi's government. His declared top priorities were to remove piles of rubbish from the streets of Naples and to improve the state of the Italian economy, which had underperformed the rest of the Eurozone for years. He also said he was open to working with the opposition, and pledged to fight tax evasion, reform justice and reduce public debt. He intended to reduce the number of Cabinet ministers to 12. Berlusconi and his ministers (Berlusconi IV Cabinet) were sworn in on 8 May 2008.

On 21 November 2008, the National Council of Forza Italia, chaired by Alfredo Biondi and attended by Berlusconi himself, dissolved Forza Italia and established The People of Freedom, whose inauguration took place on 27 March 2009, the fifteenth anniversary of Berlusconi's first electoral victory.

While Forza Italia had never held a formal party congress to formulate its rules, procedures, and democratic balloting for candidates and issues, (since 1994 three party conventions of Forza Italia have been held, all of them resolving to support Berlusconi and re-electing him by acclamation) on 27 March 2009 at the foundation congress of the People of Freedom political movement the statute of the new party was subject to a vote of approval. On 5820 voting delegates 5811 voted in favour, 4 against and 5 abstained. During that political congress Silvio Berlusconi was elected as Chairman of the People of Freedom by handraising. According to the official minutes of the congress the result favoured Berlusconi, with 100 percent of the delegates voting for him.

=== The People of Freedom split and fall of the Berlusconi IV Cabinet ===
Between 2009-10 Gianfranco Fini, former leader of the conservative National Alliance (AN) and President of the Italian Chamber of Deputies, became a vocal critic of the leadership of Berlusconi. Fini departed from party's majority line on several issues but, most of all, he was a proponent of a more structured party organisation. His criticism was aimed at the leadership style of Berlusconi, who tends to rely on his personal charisma to lead the party from the centre and supports a lighter form of party, which in his mind should be a movement-party that organises itself only at election times.

On 15 April 2010 an association named Generation Italy was launched in order to better represent Fini's views within the party and push for a different party organisation. On 22 April 2010 the National Committee of the PdL convened in Rome for the first time in a year. The conflict between Fini and Berlusconi was covered live by television. At the end of the day a resolution proposed by Berlusconi's loyalists was put before the assembly and approved by a landslide margin. On 29 July 2010 the party executive released a document in which Fini was described as "incompatible" with the political line of the PdL and unable to perform his job of President of the Chamber of Deputies in a neutral way. Berlusconi asked Fini to step down and the executive proposed the suspension from party membership of three MPs who had harshly criticized Berlusconi and accused some party members of criminal offences. As response, Fini and his followers formed their own groups in both chambers under the name of Future and Freedom (FLI). It was soon clear that FLI would leave the PdL and become an independent party. On 7 November, during a convention in Bastia Umbra, Fini asked Berlusconi to step down from his post of prime minister and proposed a new government including the Union of the Centre (UdC). A few days later, the four FLI members of the government resigned. On 14 December FLI voted against Berlusconi in a vote of confidence in the Chamber of Deputies, a vote won by Berlusconi by 314 to 311.

In May 2011 the party suffered a big blow in local elections. Particularly painful was the loss of Milan, Berlusconi's hometown and party stronghold. In response to this and to crescent fibrillation within party ranks, Angelino Alfano, the justice minister, was chosen as national secretary in charge of re-organising and renewing the party. The appointment of 40-year-old Alfano, a former Christian Democrat and later leader of Forza Italia in Sicily, was unanimously decided by the party executive. On 1 July the National Council modified the party's constitution and Alfano was elected secretary almost unanimously. In his acceptance speech, Alfano proposed the introduction of primaries.

=== Resignation ===
On 10 October the Chamber of Deputies rejected the law on the budget of the State proposed by the government. As a result of this event Berlusconi moved for a confidence vote in the Chamber on 14 October, he won the vote with just 316 votes to 310, minimum required to retain a majority. An increasing number of Deputies continued to cross the floor and join the opposition and on 8 November the Chamber approved the law on the budget of the State previously rejected but with only 308 votes, while opposition parties didn't participate in the vote to highlight that Berlusconi lost his majority. After the vote, Berlusconi announced his resignation after Parliament passed economic reforms. Among other things, his perceived failure to tackle Italy's debt crisis with an estimated debt sum of €1.9 trillion ($2.6 trillion) is thought to have factored into Berlusconi's decision to leave office. While he resigned crowds of his opponents sang the hallelujah portion of George Frederick Handel's "Messiah", demonstrating their approval of the decision; there was also dancing in the streets outside the Quirinal Palace, the official residence of the president of Italy, where Berlusconi went to tender his resignation.

The austerity package was passed, it will raise €59.8 billion in savings from spending cuts and tax raises, including freezing public-sector salaries until 2014 and gradually increasing the retirement age for women in the private sector from 60 in 2014 to 65 in 2026. The resignation also came at a difficult time for Berlusconi, as he was involved in numerous trials for corruption, fraud and sex offences. He was often found guilty in lower courts but is alleged to have used loopholes in the Italian legal system to avoid imprisonment.

Berlusconi had also failed to meet some of his pre-election promises and had failed to prevent economic decline and introduce serious reforms. Many believed that the problems and doubts over Berlusconi's leadership and his coalition were one of the factors that contributed to market anxieties over an imminent Italian financial disaster, which could have a potentially catastrophic effect on the 17 Eurozone countries and the world economy as a whole. Many critics of Berlusconi accused him of using his power primarily to protect his own business ventures. Umberto Bossi, leader of the Northern League, a partner in Berlusconi's right-wing coalition, was quoted as informing reporters outside Parliament, "We asked the Prime Minister to step aside."

==== Announcement ====
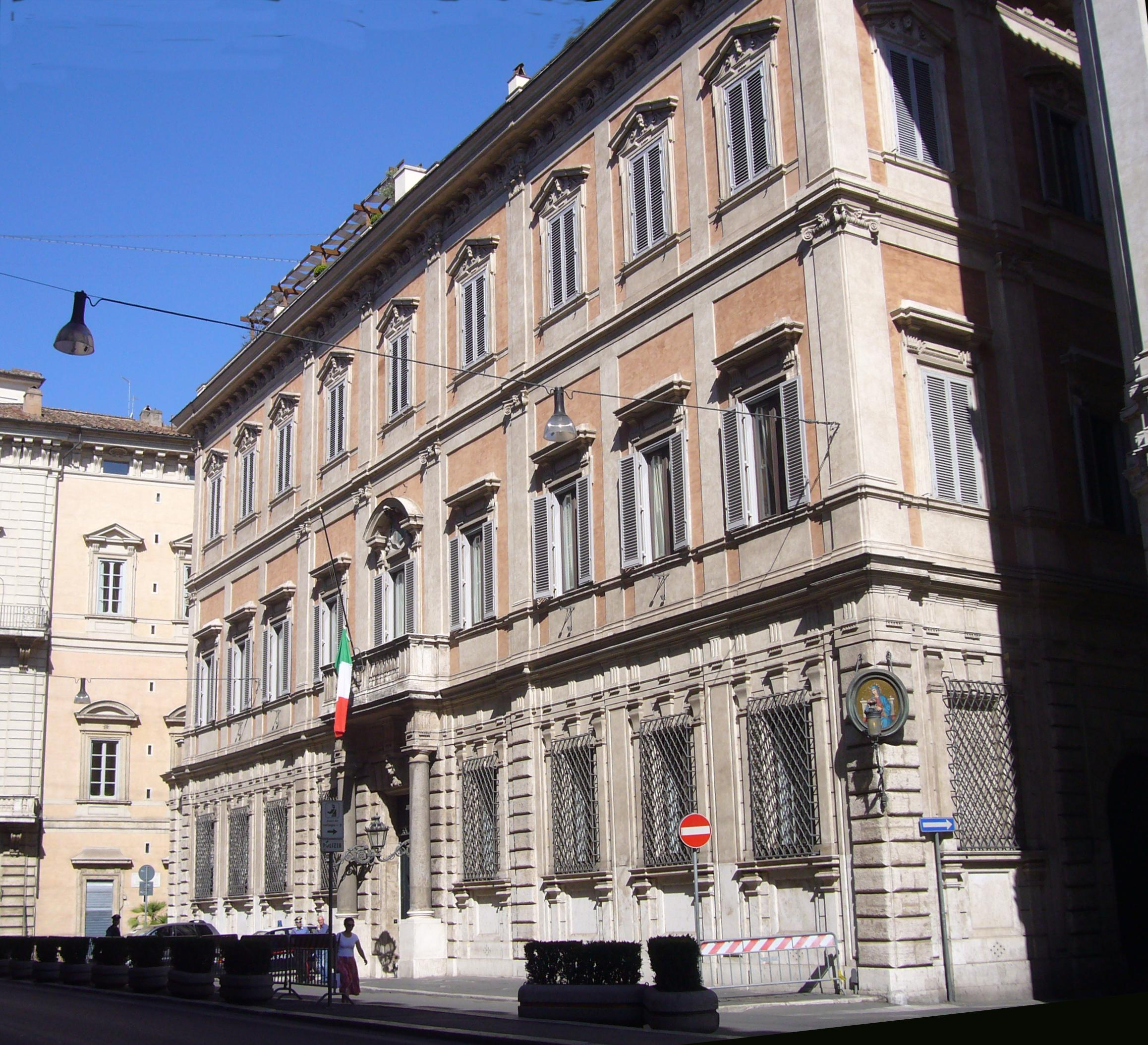
Palazzo Grazioli

CNN reported on 7 November that Berlusconi had previously denied the rumours that he was going to resign and had stated on his Facebook page that "The rumors of my resignation are groundless." On 12 November 2011, after a final meeting with his cabinet, Berlusconi met Italian president Giorgio Napolitano at the Quirinal Palace to tender his resignation. He announced this to the Italian public by telephone on one of his television channels. Italian news agency ANSA reported that Berlusconi had remarked to his aides that "This is something that deeply saddens me". Berlusconi conceded that he had lost his parliamentary majority and concluded that "things like who leads or who doesn't lead the government was less important than doing what is right for the country." Berlusconi issued a statement that he would not stand for office in Italy again after the budget defeat. In his resignation he was said to have also mentioned "eight traitors", former allies who had abstained.

==== Response ====
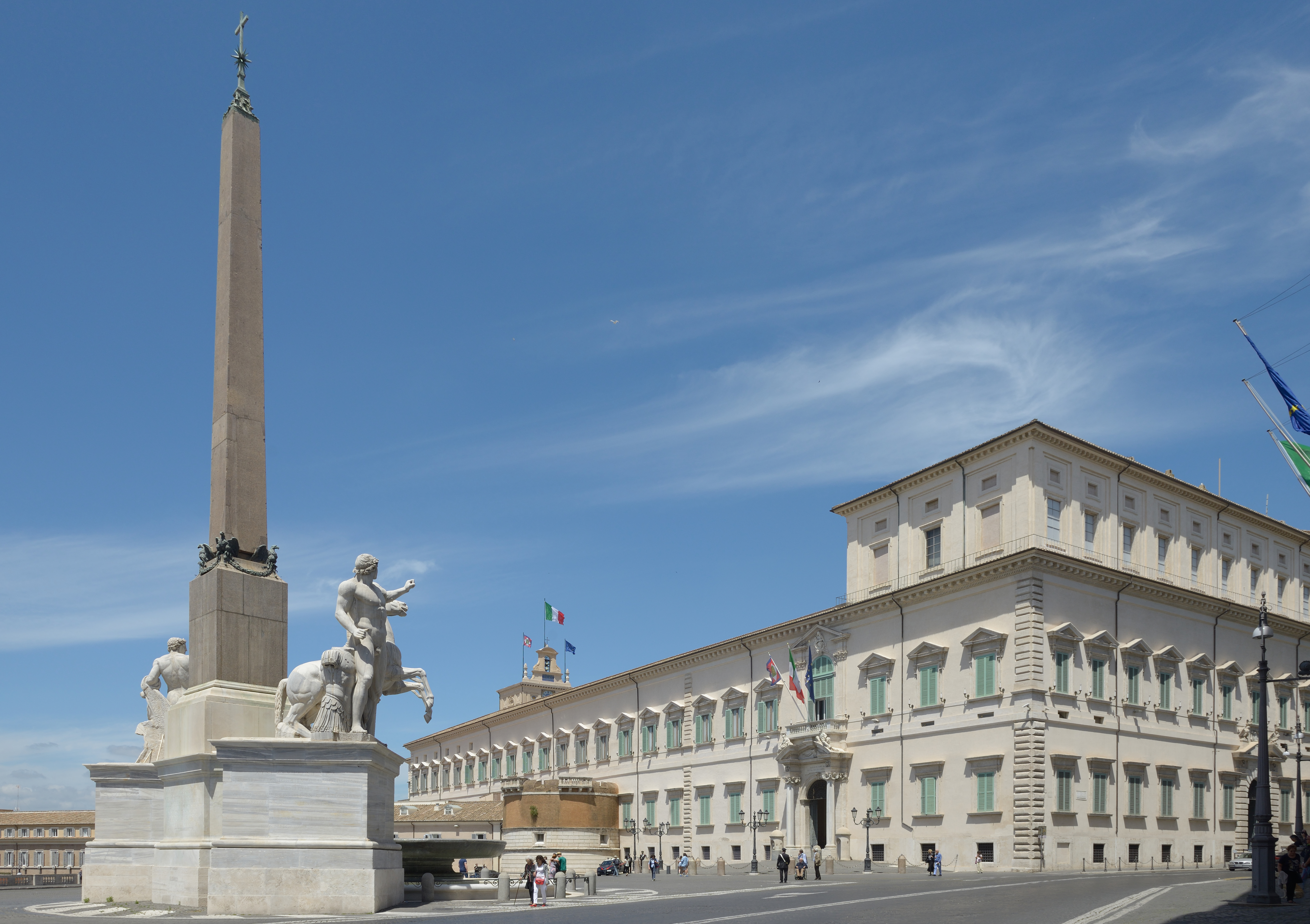
The Quirinal Palace.

As he arrived at the Quirinal Palace, a hostile crowd gathered with banners shouting insults at Berlusconi and throwing coins at the car and some 200 people marched down Via del Corso yelling "resign, resign!". After his resignation, the booing and jeering continued as he left in his convoy, with the public shouting words such as "buffoon" and "mafioso". An orchestra performed the hallelujah portion of Händel's "Messiah" and the Dies Irae portion of Mozart's "Requiem" outside the Quirinal Palace, with vocal accompaniment and dancing in the streets. La Repubblica's headline on 13 November was "Berlusconi leaves, party in the streets" whilst La Stampa's headline read "Berlusconi bids farewell, now for Monti".

President Giorgio Napolitano issued a statement saying that Berlusconi had "demonstrated to the head of state his understanding of the implications of the vote in the chamber of deputies." Opposition leader Pierluigi Bersani of the Democratic Party (PD) said "[He] has not disappeared. He has resigned". Antonio Di Pietro, leader of the Italy of Values, claimed Berlusconi was "taking another month to try to buy a few [parliamentarians]". On 12 November, following Berlusconi's resignation, Napolitano invited Mario Monti to form a new government. Monti accepted the offer and initiated talks with leaders of Italy's political parties, stating that he wished to form a government that would remain in office until the next scheduled elections in 2013. On 16 November, Monti announced that he had formed a Cabinet and was sworn in as Prime Minister of Italy (he also appointed himself as Minister of Economy and Finance), ending the almost ten-year era of Berlusconi's tenure as prime minister.

== See also ==
- Silvio Berlusconi
- Controversies surrounding Silvio Berlusconi
- Trials involving Silvio Berlusconi
