= Palazzo Grazioli =

Coordinates: 41°53′48″N 12°28′50″E

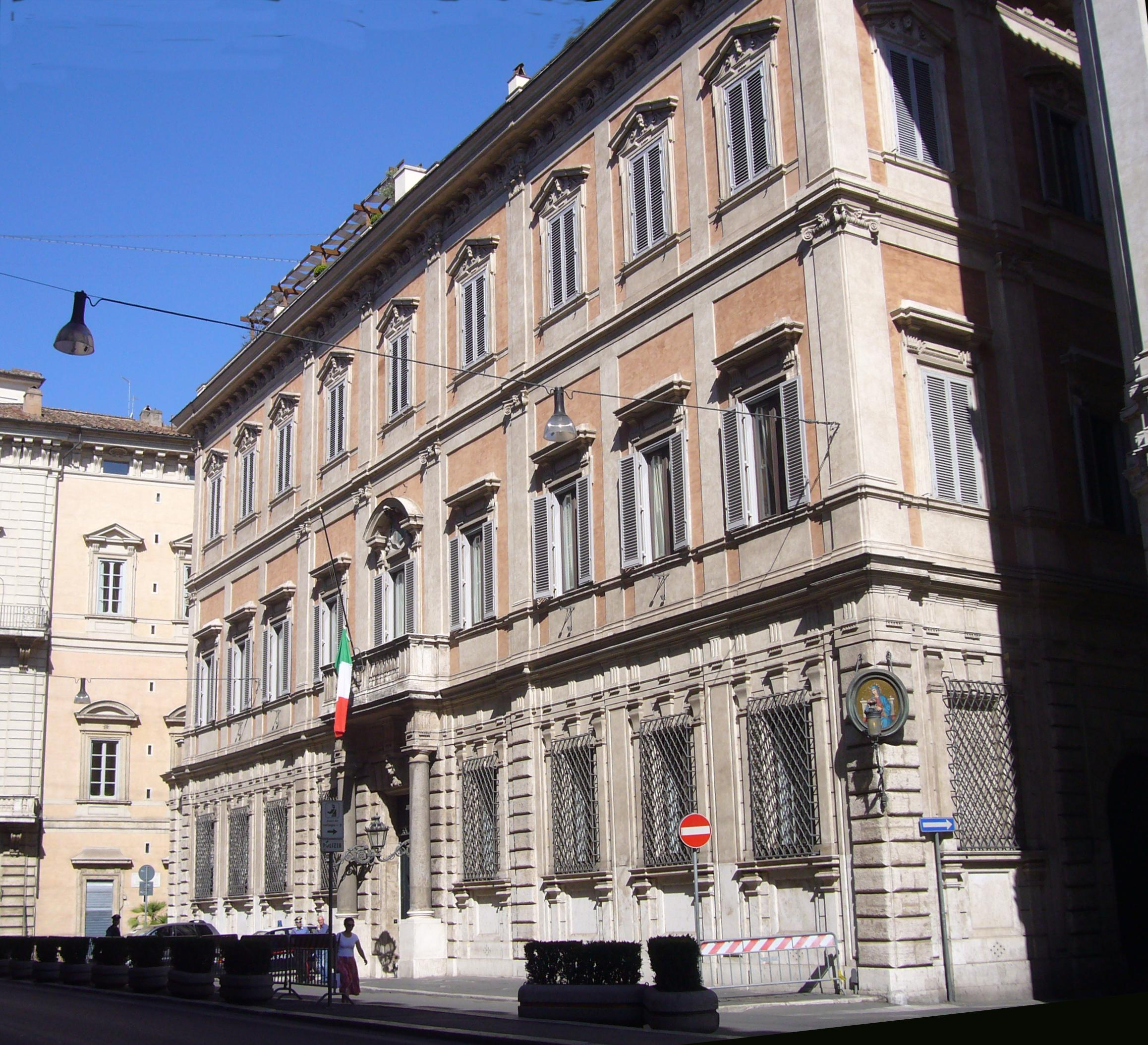
- Facade
- Interactive map of the Palazzo Grazioli area

General information
- Location: Rome, Italy

Palazzo Grazioli (Italian pronunciation: [paˈlattso ɡratˈtsjɔːli]) is a building situated at Via del Plebiscito 102 between the Palazzo Doria Pamphili and Palazzo Altieri in Rome, Italy. It is located in an area rich in archaeological remains of ancient Rome, which has been the result of numerous modifications and restoration works carried out by several Roman noble families who lived there over the centuries.

The oldest sources connect the palace to the Ercolani family and was initially built by Giacomo della Porta. The family of Luigi Gottifredi, a priest of the Society of Jesus, who settled there, made a radical renovation employing Camillo Arcucci, an architect of the Roman Baroque, in the years 1645 to 1650. In the early 19th century, the palace was the residence of the Ambassador of Austria and then the Infanta of Spain and Duchess of Lucca, Maria Luisa of Bourbon-Spain who died there in 1824. It was later acquired by Commander Grazioli, then Baron of Castelporziano and Duke of Santa Croce di Magliano, who in 1863 entrusted the restoration which ended in 1874.

The facade of the building on Via del Plebiscito is decorated with pilasters with capitals. At the center of it opens the door flanked by two Doric columns of gray granite and topped by a balcony.

The palace is known for having been a home of Silvio Berlusconi, who rented a floor of the palace from 1995 to 2021. He announced his resignation there on 12 November 2011.
