= Bunga bunga =

Phrase with various meanings

Bunga bunga is a phrase of uncertain origin and various meanings that dates from 1910 and a name for an area of Australia dating from 1852. By 2010, the phrase had gained popularity in Italy and the international press to refer to then-Italian Prime Minister Silvio Berlusconi's alleged sex parties with prostitutes, which caused a major political scandal in Italy.

== Early use ==
An 1852 issue of Hogg's Instructor states that "bunga bunga" is the name given by locals to a location near Moreton Bay on the eastern coast of Australia, although this appears to be a mistaken reference to the Bunya-Bunya pine. In 1910, Horace de Vere Cole, Virginia Woolf, her brother Adrian Stephen and a small group of friends pretended to be the Prince of Abyssinia and his entourage. They obtained permission to visit one of the world's most powerful warships, HMS Dreadnought, in Weymouth, Dorset, in what became known as the Dreadnought hoax. It was reported that each time the Commander showed them a marvel of the ship, they murmured the phrase bunga, bunga!, which then became a popular catchphrase of the time. Adrian Stephen had this to say about the phrase:

... one of the newspapers published an interview. I think it was supposed to be with one of the assistants at Clarksons, who professed to know a great deal more than he did, and in particular stated that we used the expression "Bunga-Bunga". Anyhow the words "Bunga-Bunga" became public catchwords for a time, and were introduced as tag in music-hall songs and so forth. Apparently the Admiral was unable to go ashore without having them shouted after him in the streets, and I suppose the other officers were treated in the same way.

== Resurgence in Italy ==
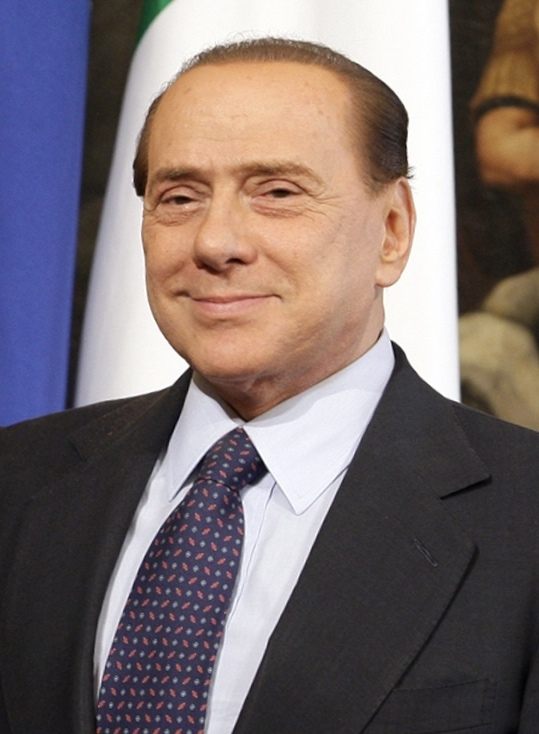
The term "bunga bunga" has been closely associated with former Italian Prime Minister Silvio Berlusconi since the 2010s.

A century later, the term bunga bunga became popular again as part of a joke from various 1980s comedians, as well as on the internet. (Note: The joke had circulated in print with other "nonsense" words for some time, for example in 1996 "mamba" (Ronald P. Hamel; Edwin R. DuBose, eds. (August 1996). Must we suffer our way to death?: cultural and theological perspectives on death by choice. Southern Methodist University Press. p. 26. ISBN 978-0-87074-392-4.) and in 1993 "chi-chi" (Colin Alexander (1 September 1993). God's Adamantine Fate. D.I. Fine. p. 245. ISBN 978-1-55611-371-0.)) The joke concerns a group of explorers captured by a native tribe, the chieftain of which asks them if they would prefer death or "bunga bunga". The first responds "bunga bunga" and had to endure being sodomised by the local tribesmen. Seeing this, the next explorer says "death", to which the chieftain replies, "You will have death, but first, some bunga bunga!"

The joke was a favorite of Italian Prime Minister Silvio Berlusconi, who was allegedly taught it by Muammar al-Gaddafi, (also the originator of the phrase Zenga Zenga). Berlusconi frequently recounted it at his dinner parties. In his version, former ministers from the centre-left opposition party (led by Romano Prodi) were captured and raped. This expression was then frequently quoted by the Italian and international press in the run-up to the 2011 investigation surrounding the Berlusconi underage prostitution charges, where it acquired a quite different meaning as "an orgy involving prostitutes and a powerful leader". In 2010, the term in Italy had become "an instant, supposedly hilarious, household expression".

Contemporary explanations disagreed on its meaning or perhaps illustrated its reference range. It was said to be "a sort of underwater orgy where nude young women allegedly encircled the nude host and/or his friends in his swimming pool", "an African-style ritual" performed for male spectators by "20 naked young women", or the erotic entertainment of a rich host involving pole dancing and competitive striptease by skimpily clad "women in nurses' outfits and police uniforms", the prize being prostitution for the host.

Sabina Began claimed that the phrase was a nickname based on her surname and that she had organized the parties. Bunga bunga culture sparked a social movement called Se Non Ora Quando (If Not Now, When?) in 2011, which included street protests. Writing in 2011, the lexicographer Jonathon Green did not expect the term to make much headway or to last in English.

== In popular culture ==
- In the 1950 Bugs Bunny cartoon Bushy Hare, the quote "Unga Bunga Bunga" was used during a yelling fit between Bugs and "Nature Boy".
- In 2006, Flavor Flav released the album Hollywood containing the track "Unga Bunga Bunga".
- In 2011, the faux-French, American band Nous Non Plus released a song entitled "Bunga Bunga". The cover of the single featured a picture of Silvio Berlusconi. The song lyrics list famous cities around the world (in French) while the video is a black and white show-reel of semi-nude dancing women.
- In 2012, the term was used in Season 18, Episode 1 of the British motoring show Top Gear as character The Stig's Italian cousin emerged from a motor-home dressed in a suit, followed by three glamorous girls, to set a lap time in a Ferrari 458 Italia at the Autodromo Enzo e Dino Ferrari (Imola Circuit).
- In 2013, the American band Cherry Poppin' Daddies used the term several times in the lyrics for their song "The Babooch", a satire of "one-percenter" lifestyles. The song's music video features clips of Berlusconi alongside other billionaire figures.
- In 2014, Australian comedians Maynard and Tim Ferguson started a podcast named Bunga Bunga.
- In 2020, Wondery released a podcast about Berlusconi's rise and fall entitled "Bunga Bunga". The host was comedienne Whitney Cummings.
- In the 2021 film No Time to Die, James Bond (played by Daniel Craig) uses the phrase "SPECTRE bunga bunga" while attending a party in Cuba filled with SPECTRE agents.
- The 2022 debut single "You Will Never Work in Television Again" by English band the Smile refers explicitly to "bunga bunga".

== See also ==
- wiktionary:bunga
- Bongo Bongo Land
- Bongo-Bongo (linguistics)
- Group sex
