= Bongo Bongo Land =

Pejorative term used to refer to Third-World countries

In British English, Bongo Bongo Land (or Bongo-bongo Land) is a pejorative term used to refer to Third-World countries, particularly in Africa, or to a fictional such country.

== Possible origins ==
The origin of the term is unclear but it may come from one or both of the following:

- Bongo drums believed to be played by African natives
- A parody of African place-names or languages, particularly those in Bantu languages. Bantu languages avoid consonant clusters except with nasals, almost all words end in vowels, and reduplication is commonly used to mark intensity or frequency.

There is a reference to "Bongoland" in the English translation by Ellen Elizabeth Frewer of a book originally in German by Georg August Schweinfurth, published in 1874 in English as The Heart of Africa. Schweinfurth locates it as lying between 6-8 degrees North and in the south-western region of the Bahr-el-Ghazal (South Sudan). The Belgian explorer Adolphe de Calonne-Beaufaict also refers to the 'Bongo of the Bahr-el-Ghazal' in his 1921 study of the Azande people. The English anthropologist E. E. Evans-Pritchard published a description of the Bongo in 1929, in which he pointed out how their way of life was systematically destroyed by the Arab slave and ivory traders from the North.

The 1947 song "Civilization" by Bob Hilliard and Carl Sigman, recorded by various artists, contained the line "Bongo, Bongo, Bongo, I Don't Want to Leave the Congo". A variation of this was adopted for a poster produced by the fascist Union Movement bearing the chant "Bongo, bongo, whites aren't going to leave the Congo". In the 1970s, the cinema advertisement for Silk Cut cigarettes parodying the 1964 film Zulu was supposedly set in "Mbongoland".

The word "bongo" is also the slang nickname of the Tanzanian city of Dar es Salaam, and the kind of music which originated from Dar es Salaam is called "Bongo Flava", a slang version of the phrase "bongo flavour". Also, some Tanzanian films are known as "bongo films".

== Controversies ==
The term has featured in political controversies. In 1985, Alan Clark, while Conservative Member of Parliament for Plymouth Sutton, once, in a departmental meeting, allegedly referred to Africa as "Bongo Bongo Land". When called to account, however, Clark denied the comment had any racist overtones, saying it had simply been a reference to the President of Gabon, Omar Bongo.

In 2004, Taki Theodoracopulos called Kenya "bongo-bongo land" in a column for The Spectator. The Guardian later criticised his use of "offensive and outdated stereotypes".

In July 2013, Godfrey Bloom, a member of the European Parliament for Yorkshire and the Humber for the UK Independence Party (UKIP), was filmed referring to countries which receive overseas aid from the United Kingdom as "Bongo Bongo Land". UKIP later banned use of the term. A spokesperson from Show Racism the Red Card stated that Bloom's remarks were "crude stereotypes that see Britain as a civilised place and overseas as tribal". Matthew d'Ancona wrote in The Daily Telegraph: "There may indeed be some who inwardly cheered Bloom’s choice of words. But there will be many – including, crucially, some who agree with his position on aid – who felt queasy at the use of such antediluvian language."

In 2019 the Labour Party MP Tan Dhesi asked the prime minister, Boris Johnson of the Conservative Party, to apologise for his use of derogatory terms to describe immigrants, citing "towel-head, or Taliban, or coming from bongo-bongo land" as examples of such insults which minority communities receive; though not necessarily ascribing these terms to Johnson, the speech was made in relation to other comments made by him.

== See also ==
- Bongoland, a 2003 American/Tanzanian film directed by Josiah Kibira.
- Bunga bunga
- Bongo (antelope), the largest forest antelope in Africa
- Um Bongo, a tropical fruit drink with African-themed branding
- Bongo bongo in linguistics
- King Leonardo and His Short Subjects, a 1960 animation series about the fictional African country of Bongo Congo
