= Nicole Minetti =

Italian television personality, dental hygienist, and politician

Nicole Minetti (born 11 March 1985, in Rimini, Italy) is an Italian former showgirl, dental hygienist, and politician.

== Early life and education ==
She is the daughter of Antonio Minetti—born in London to a family originally from the province of Parma, an entrepreneur active in Rimini in the event planning industry, and Georgina Reid, an Englishwoman from Newcastle upon Tyne who worked as a go-go dancer at the Paradiso Dream Club in Rimini and later became a dance instructor. She has a younger sister named Angelica. She grew up studying ballet and modern dance with her mother.

She attended the "Giulio Cesare" State Classical High School in Rimini; thanks in part to her native-level English, she worked as a hostess at Rimini Fiera. In 2004, during her senior year of high school, she failed her exams. The following year, she earned her high school diploma as a private candidate and enrolled in the Biology degree program at the University of Bologna. After an unsuccessful year, in 2006 she moved to Milan to study dental hygiene at the Vita-Salute San Raffaele University, where she earned her bachelor's degree in November 2009. She later obtained a master's degree in Health and Social Care Sciences.

== Career ==
=== Television Experience ===
She was spotted having breakfast at a café on Corso Como by a production technician from Scorie, a satirical television programme on Rai 2 hosted by Nicola Savino; after passing an audition, she became one of the show's assistants from September 2007 through 2008. That same year, while continuing to work as a hostess at trade shows and events, she found a job in November at EICMA, at the Publitalia '80 booth, an opportunity that allowed her to meet Silvio Berlusconi, of whom she is a great admirer. Also on Rai 2, she made her debut as a correspondent for Stelle e note di Natale, under the artistic direction of Luciano Silighini. In the spring, after passing another audition, she appeared on the show Colorado Cafè on Italia 1, also directed by Silighini, in the role of "Hit Model".

=== Political career ===
Minetti was elected to the Regional Council of Lombardy in 2010 as part of President Roberto Formigoni's list: inclusion on the list guaranteed the candidates automatic election should the presidential candidate to whom they were linked win. It was reported that her inclusion on that list was "sought at all costs" by then-Prime Minister Silvio Berlusconi, who had met her at the Publitalia booths, where Minetti worked as a hostess, and who, according to her statements, later gave her bracelets.

Minetti first rose to prominence in political and media circles in the winter of 2010 precisely because of the unusual candidacy that had allowed her to rise rapidly despite her lack of any prior political experience. At the time, there were numerous complaints within the PdL, some of whose members opposed the inclusion of the woman on the reserved list.

== Legal Proceedings ==
=== Involvement in the "Rubygate" ===
Minetti came into the public spotlight in late October 2010 following her involvement in the so-called "Rubygate", the case of 17-year-old Moroccan Karima El Mahroug (a.k.a. Ruby), who was taken to the police station on suspicion of theft and then, within a few hours, released thanks to a phone call from Silvio Berlusconi himself. Minetti is under investigation by the Milan prosecutor's office for aiding and abetting prostitution. In addition to her, the list of suspects includes the then-director of TG4, Emilio Fede, and the manager and talent scout Lele Mora, who was previously implicated alongside Fabrizio Corona in the Vallettopoli scandal. On the night of 27 May 22010, Minetti, at the request of then-Prime Minister Berlusconi, went to the Milan police station to sign the custody papers for El Mahroug, who was a minor at the time and was being held by law enforcement on suspicion of theft and for lacking identification documents. Minetti distanced herself from the minor, stating that El Mahroug was merely an acquaintance, not a friend; she justified going to the police headquarters late at night to pick up the girl as a favour requested directly by the prime minister. Despite the foster care placement for the minor granted by the juvenile court judge, Minetti denies ever having provided the girl with lodging.

=== The Ruby bis Trial: Facilitating Prostitution ===
In July 2013, Minetti, along with the other two defendants (Emilio Fede and Lele Mora), was convicted in the first instance by the Court of Milan in the Ruby bis trial and sentenced to five years in prison and a five-year ban from public office on charges of facilitating prostitution. In 2014, the Court of Appeals reduced the sentence to 3 years in prison, effectively granting her the opportunity to request an alternative measure to imprisonment from the supervisory court. On September 22, 2015, the Supreme Court of Cassation upheld her appeal and overturned the Ruby bis verdict against Emilio Fede and Nicole Minetti, remanding the case for a new appeal trial, while simultaneously rejecting the appeal by the Milan Public Prosecutor's Office, which had sought harsher sentences. On May 7, 2018, the new appeal trial concluded with the conviction being upheld, but with a slight reduction in the sentence to 2 years and 10 months. On April 11, 2019, the Court of Cassation definitively upheld the sentence of 2 years and 10 months.

=== Reimbursement Scandal ===
In 2015, at the request of the public prosecutor, judges indicted Nicole Minetti and other politicians on charges of embezzlement and fraud for having requested reimbursement from the Regional Council of Lombardy for numerous personal expenses. The records of the Milan Public Prosecutor's Office investigation revealed several requests for reimbursement of expenses for dinners and luxury hotels, tablets, candles, and books, with a total financial loss of €19,651.96 as quantified by the Court of Auditors.

In January 2019, the Milan Court of First Instance sentenced Minetti to 1 year and 8 months in prison, compared to the 2 years and 2 months sought by the prosecutor.

In July 2021, during the appeal trial held at the Milan Court of Appeals, in which she had been indicted, Minetti agreed to a plea bargain resulting in a sentence of 1 year and 1 month in prison.

=== Granting of a pardon ===
Sentenced to a cumulative prison term of 3 years and 11 months, she applied for probationary placement with social services in 2022. On July 19, 2024, she obtained recognition of the adoption of a Uruguayan child from the Venice Juvenile Court, after having already adopted him in his home country in February 2023 and having cared for him since 2020. The hearing for temporary custody by social services was scheduled for December 3, 2025, but as early as the beginning of that year, Minetti's lawyers initiated a request for a pardon, submitting it to the Office of the President of the Republic in late July 2025. With the favorable opinion of the Attorney General of the Court of Appeals on January 9, 2026] and of Minister of Justice Carlo Nordio shortly thereafter, who noted the "need to address family needs," the pardon was finally granted on February 18, 2026 by President of the Italian Republic Sergio Mattarella on "humanitarian grounds" citing "serious health conditions of a minor relative", namely the Uruguayan child adopted some time earlier.

The news of the pardon was first announced in early April 2026 on the Raitre program Mi manda Raitre and made public by the press on April 11, prompting the Office of the President of the Republic to issue an immediate statement of clarification. A subsequent journalistic investigation by Il Fatto Quotidiano, published about two weeks later, cast doubt on the veracity of the facts that led to the granting of the pardon, sparking media interest and a bitter political and institutional debate, including on how the institution of the pardon itself is structured (which was better regulated by Constitutional Court ruling no. 200/2006, allowing the Presidency of the Republic to establish a dedicated, autonomous office for evaluating pardon requests, albeit always based on the findings of the Ministry of Justice and the competent courts in each individual case). Meanwhile, journalistic investigations are gradually revealing more and more critical issues: the biological mother of the Uruguayan child, named María de los Ángeles González Colinet, has been missing since mid-February 2026 in a neighborhood of Maldonado, leading the Uruguayan authorities to issue a national alert for her whereabouts on April 14, and the two Italian medical facilities referred to in the attachments to the petition for clemency report that they never treated the child in question, the biological mother's lawyer died in a fire in June 2024; the adoption process itself appears to have been irregular, and the registrar who headed the Uruguayan Institute for Adoption and Childhood (INAU) was recently removed from office due to irregular and lax management of adoptions, there may be links between Minetti and, above all, her partner Giuseppe Cipriani Jr. and child trafficking rings, in addition to irregular Sunday outings of several INAU children to their ranch in the area, and even to Jeffrey Epstein's network, as hypothesized by various members of the Uruguayan parliament.

Interpol has been notified, and a joint investigation between the two countries is being considered to thoroughly examine the entire matter. Following the development of journalistic investigations, the Office of the President urged the Ministry of Justice to order an urgent and comprehensive review to verify the accuracy of the information brought to the attention of the Office of the President.
