= Central Energy Italian Gas Holding =

Italian gas distribution and trade company

Central Energy Italian Inc is an Italian gas distribution and trade company. It is part of Central Energy, a company related to Gazprom.

Bruno Mentasti-Granelli, who is a close friend of former Italian Prime Minister late Silvio Berlusconi, owns 33 percent of CEIGH through two companies, Hexagon Prima and Hexagon Seconda.

== History ==
A deal between Italian Eni and Gazprom picked CEI as a partner delivering gas to Italy. The deal was denounced due to scandal. The Italian parliament blocked the contract, accusing Berlusconi of a personal interest.

Robert Nowikovsky, an Austrian lawyer linked to Russian operations, was one of the company's directors.

The 2008 article "Berlusconi, Centrex, Hexagon 1 and 2 and Gazprom" suggested:

This subterfuge suggests that the Italian Prime Minister is deeply indebted to Moscow and will play the role of a loyal puppet, similar to that played by former German Chancellor Gerhard Schröder and former EU Commissioner Romano Prodi, who have been promoting the Kremlin’s energy, and possibly other, interests in their home countries and in the EU in any which way they can.
