= Silvio Berlusconi prostitution trial =

Trial involving former Italian Prime Minister

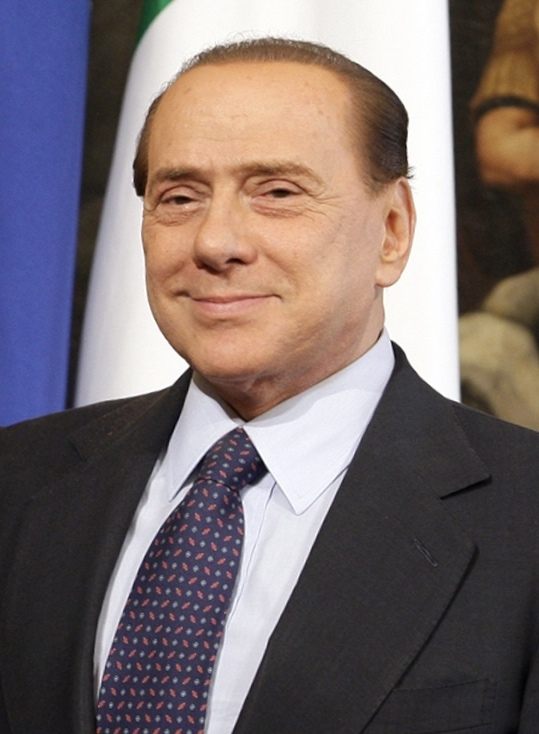
Portrait of Silvio Berlusconi in 2010

Silvio Berlusconi, then the Prime Minister of Italy, was accused and initially convicted of paying 17-year-old Moroccan Karima El Mahroug, also known by the stage name Ruby Rubacuori (Italian for "Ruby the Heartstealer"), for sexual services between February and May 2010 when she was under the age of 18; he was found not guilty on appeal. (Note: Neither having sex with a person between the ages of 14 and 17 nor adult prostitution is illegal in Italy, but paying a person under 18 for sex is a crime, punishable by up to three years' imprisonment.) He was also found not guilty on appeal after having been formerly convicted of malfeasance in office (Italian: concussione) by arranging to have El Mahroug released from police detention during an incident in which she was briefly held on claims of theft. On 24 June 2013, the Court of First Instance sentenced Berlusconi to seven years in prison, and banned him from public office for life. Berlusconi appealed the sentence, and on 18 July 2014, an appeals court overturned Berlusconi's conviction, thus making him once again eligible to hold elected office.

== Theft arrest of El Mahroug ==
On 27 May 2010, El Mahroug was arrested by the police in Milan after being accused of the theft of €3,000. Since she was not carrying any legal or identification documents, the officers took her to the local police headquarters to identify her and for questioning.

After a couple of hours, while she was being questioned, Berlusconi, who was at the time in Paris, called the head of the police in Milan and pressured for her release, claiming the girl was the niece of then-Egyptian President Hosni Mubarak and that in order to avoid a diplomatic crisis, she was to be released into the custody of Nicole Minetti. Minetti was known for previous associations with Berlusconi, having danced for Colorado Cafe, a show on one of Berlusconi's TV channels, and on Scorie, an Italian version of Candid Camera. In November 2009 she became a dental hygienist, and shortly afterward treated Berlusconi for two broken teeth and facial injuries after he was attacked with a marble statue at a political rally. In February 2010, she was selected as one of the candidates representing Berlusconi's The People of Freedom party, despite her lack of any political experience, and was seated on the Regional Council of Lombardy the following month.

Following repeated telephone calls by Berlusconi to the police authorities, El Mahroug was eventually released and entrusted to Minetti's care. The Guardian reported that according to a series of media reports in October 2010, Berlusconi had met El Mahroug, then 17, through Minetti. Mahroug insisted that she had not slept with the then-74-year-old prime minister. She told Italian newspapers that she merely attended dinner at his mansion near Milan. El Mahroug said she sat next to Berlusconi, who later took her upstairs and gave her an envelope containing €7,000. She said he also gave her jewelry.

== Investigation ==
In January 2011, Berlusconi was placed under criminal investigation relating to El Mahroug for allegedly having sex with an underage person and for abuse of office relating to her release from detention. Berlusconi's lawyers were quick to deny the allegations as "absurd and without foundation" and called the investigation a "serious interference with the private life of the prime minister without precedent in the judicial history of the country".

The Telegraph reported on 6 March 2011 that prosecutors were days from requesting charges against Emilio Fede, a television anchorman, and Lele Mora, a well-known celebrity agent, for procuring underage girls in a "vast pimping network" to attend "bunga bunga" sex parties with the prime minister. According to the prosecutors' dossier, Fede "discovered" El Mahroug when acting as a judge at a beauty pageant in Sicily in September 2009, and passed her on to Mora's office in central Milan, which served as a "form of 'clearing centre' for women eager to enter the prime minister's circle in pursuit of money, gifts and help with their show business careers".

While the investigators claim to have evidence from lawful interception of mobile phone conversations, Berlusconi denied the allegations through his lawyers, who called the investigation absurd and without foundation. Vote by parliamentarian majority took place on 5 April 2011, in order to assert ministeriality, but it was reversed later by the Constitutional Court.

== Trial of Berlusconi ==
On 15 February 2011, a judge indicted Berlusconi to stand trial on charges carrying up to 15 years in prison. Paying for sex with a minor in Italy is punished within a range of six months to three years' imprisonment, while the crime of malfeasance in office (Italian: concussione) is more severely punished, from four years to twelve years' imprisonment, as it is considered a type of extortion committed by a public officer.

The fast-track trial opened on 6 April 2011 and was adjourned until 31 May 2011. El Mahroug's lawyer said that Mahroug would not be attaching herself to the case as a civil complainant and denies that she ever made herself available for money. Another alleged victim, Giorgia Iafrate, also decided not to be a party to the case. In January 2013, judges rejected an application from Berlusconi's lawyers to have the trial adjourned so that it would not interfere with Italy's 2013 general election in which Berlusconi participated.

=== Verdict and aftermath ===
On 24 June 2013, Berlusconi was found guilty of paying for sex with the underaged El Mahroug and of abusing his office. He was sentenced by the Court of First Instance to seven years in prison, one more year than had been requested by the prosecution, and banned from public office for life.

In January 2014, Berlusconi deposited an appeal against the judgment, requesting its complete absolution. The appeal process began on 20 June. On 18 July 2014, the Italian appeals court announced the appeal had been successful and the convictions against Berlusconi were being overturned. According to the court's published summary of the judgement, Berlusconi was acquitted from the extortion charges (abuse of power) because "the fact does not exist" and from the child prostitution charge because "the fact is not a crime". The more detailed court reasoning for acquittal was due to be published within 90 days, and the prosecutor stated he would then most likely appeal the decision to the Court of Cassation. In March 2015, Berlusconi's acquittal was upheld by high court.

On 28 January 2017, an Italian court ordered Berlusconi to stand trial on 4 April 2017 on charges of allegedly bribing witnesses with €10 million (US$11 million) in order to silence them over accusations he paid for sex with young women.

== See also ==
- Silvio Berlusconi § Controversies
- Silvio Berlusconi § Legal problems
- Sabina Beganović
