= Policies of Silvio Berlusconi =

Silvio Berlusconi was the Prime Minister of Italy, the head of the country's government, for almost ten years.

== Berlusconism ==
Berlusconism (Italian: Berlusconismo) is a term used in the Western media and by some Italian analysts to describe the political positions of former Prime Minister Silvio Berlusconi.

=== Origins and features ===
The term "Berlusconismo" emerged in the 1980s, characterised by a strongly positive connotation, as synonym of the "entrepreneurial optimism" of the time, defined as an entrepreneurial spirit which is not discouraged by difficulties, with a confidence in being able to solve problems. However, starting in the 21st century, in consequence of the increasing identification of Silvio Berlusconi as a primarily political figure, the attributed meaning changed in the context of journalistic and political language.

According to the Italian definition given by the online vocabulary of the Encyclopedia Institute, Berlusconismo has a wide range of meanings, all having their origins in the figure of Silvio Berlusconi, and the political movement inspired by him: the substantive refers not only to the "thought movement", but also to the "social phenomenon", and, even, the phenomenon "of custom" bound to his entrepreneurial and political figure. The term Berlusconismo is also used to refer to a certain laissez-faire vision supported by him, not only of the economy and the markets, but also with reference to the same policy.

According to his political opponents and business rivals, Berlusconismo is only a form of demagogic populism, comparable to fascism, stressing the fact that Berlusconi has declared his admiration for Benito Mussolini, even though he has criticised the racial Fascist laws and the alliance with Nazi Germany, referring to himself as pro-Israel. In 2013, he returned to calling Mussolini a good leader whose biggest mistake was signing up to exterminate the Jews. Instead his supporters compare Berlusconismo to the French Gaullism and the Argentine Peronism.

=== Political positions ===
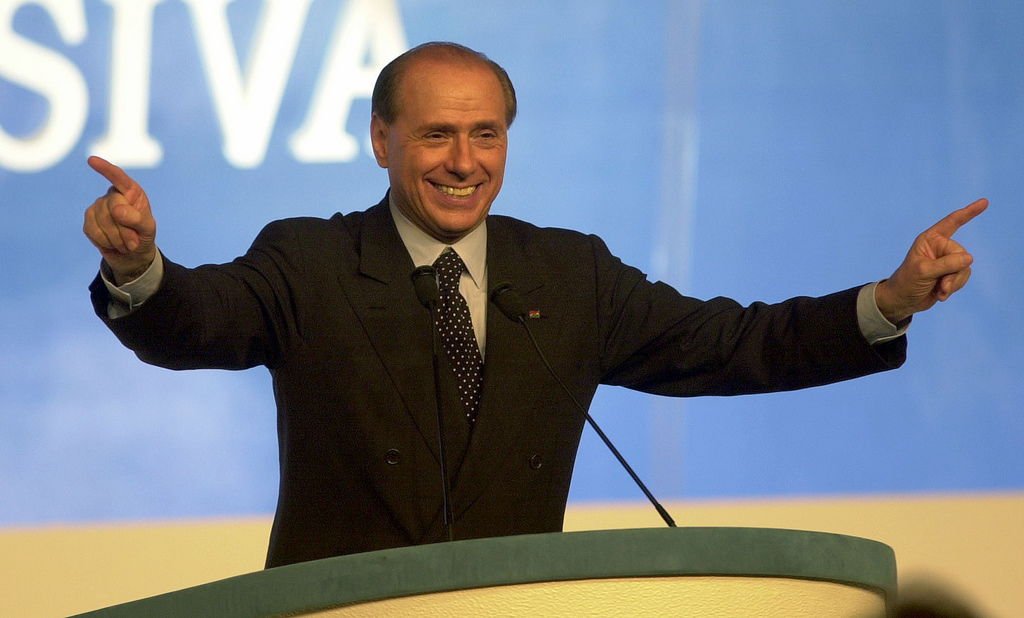
Silvio Berlusconi during a Forza Italia rally.

Berlusconi defines himself, and by extension Berlusconism, as moderate, liberal and pro-free trade (Liberismo). However, national and foreign authors have noticed that Berlusconi's liberal rhetoric was little applied during his governments, never reducing taxes or public spending, or also growing its.

A feature of Berlusconi's leadership tactics is to use the party as a mean to gain power (with the party described as a "light party", because of its lack of a complex internal structure). This is decidedly comparable to the political tactics used by Charles De Gaulle in France. Another feature of great importance is the emphasis on a "Liberal revolution", publicised and summarised by the "Contract with the Italians" of 2001. A strong reformism is added to these pillars, principally of the form of the Italian state and the constitution" in favour of moving from a Parliamentary system to a Semi-presidential system, a higher election threshold, the abolition of the Senate, the halving in size of the Chamber of Deputies, the abolition of the provinces and the reform of the judiciary, with separation of the careers between magistrates and magistrates's civil responsibility, from Berlusconi considered impartial. Berlusconi has declared himself to be persecuted by the judiciary, having undergone 34 processes, accusing them of being manipulated by the political left and comparing himself to Enzo Tortora as a victim of a miscarriage of justice. More recently, Berlusconi has declared himself in favour of Civil Unions.

== Attempt to reform the Italian constitution ==
A key point in Berlusconi's government programme was a planned reform of the Italian Constitution, which Berlusconi considered to be 'inspired by [the] Soviets', an issue the coalition parties themselves initially had significantly different opinions about. The Lega Nord insisted on a federalist reform (devolution of more power to the Regions) as the condition itself for remaining in the coalition. The National Alliance party pushed for the so-called 'strong premiership' (more powers to the executive), intended as a counterweight to any federalist reform, in order to preserve the integrity of the nation. The Union of Christian and Centre Democrats asked for a proportional electoral law that would not damage small parties and was generally more willing to discuss compromises with the moderate wing of the opposition.

Difficulties in arranging a mediation caused some internal unrest in the Berlusconi government in 2003, but then they were mostly overcome and the law (comprising power devolution to the regions, Federal Senate and "strong premiership") was passed by the Senate in April 2004; it was slightly modified by the Chamber of Deputies in October 2004, and again in October 2005 and finally approved by the Senate on 16 November 2005 with a bare majority. Approval in a referendum is necessary in order to amend the Italian Constitution without a qualified two-thirds parliamentary majority. The referendum was held on the 25th and 26 July 2006 and resulted in the rejection of the constitutional reform, with 61.3% of the voters opposing it.

== Foreign policy ==
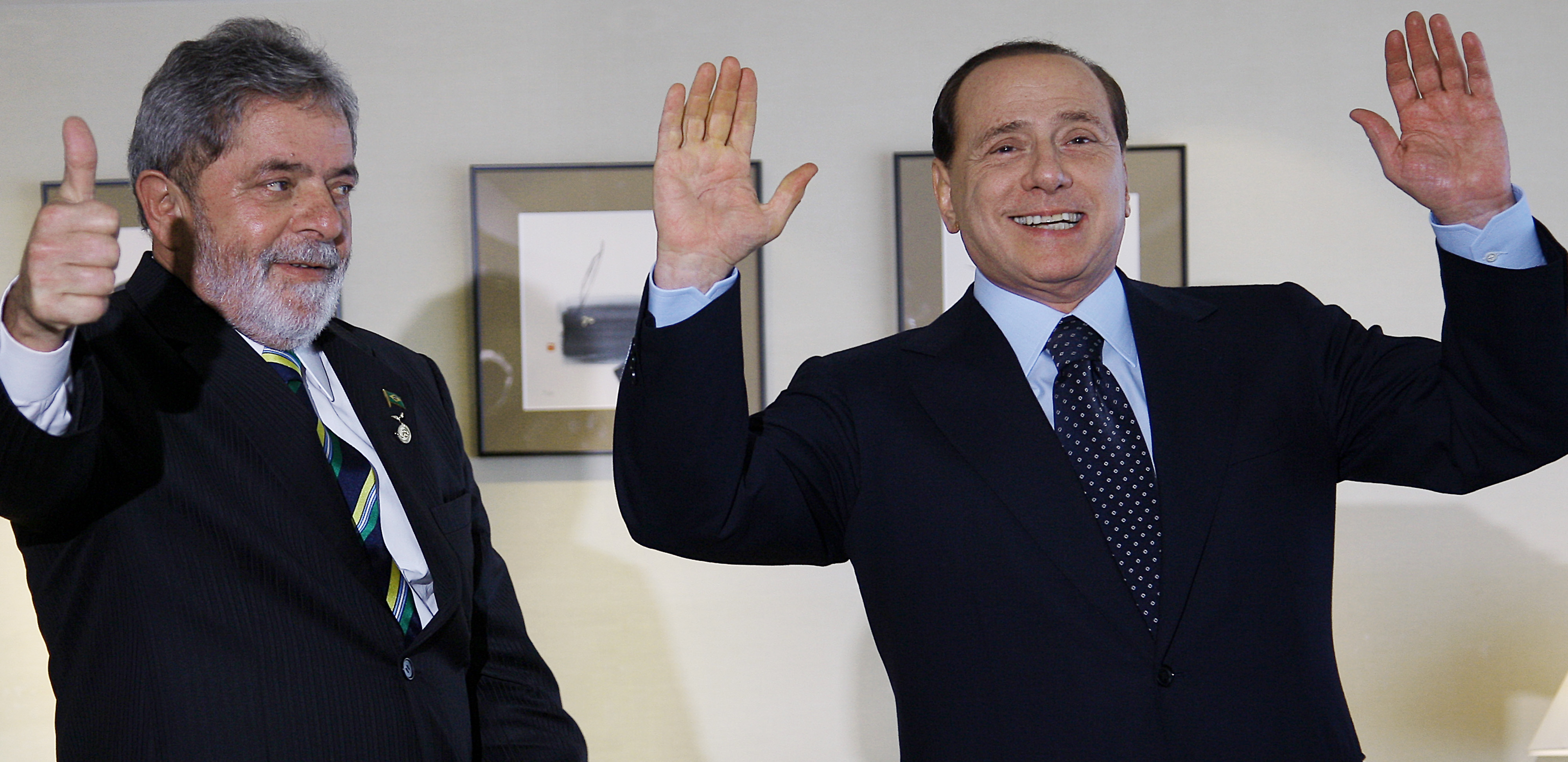
Brazilian ex-President Luiz Inácio Lula da Silva with Silvio Berlusconi

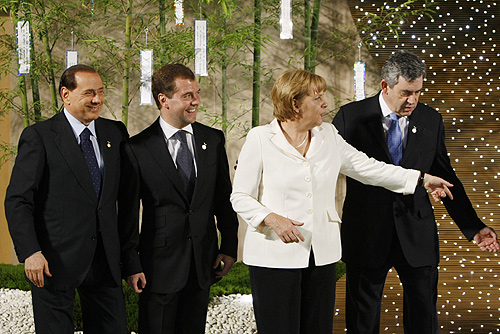
From left to right: Silvio Berlusconi, Dmitry Medvedev, Angela Merkel, and Gordon Brown

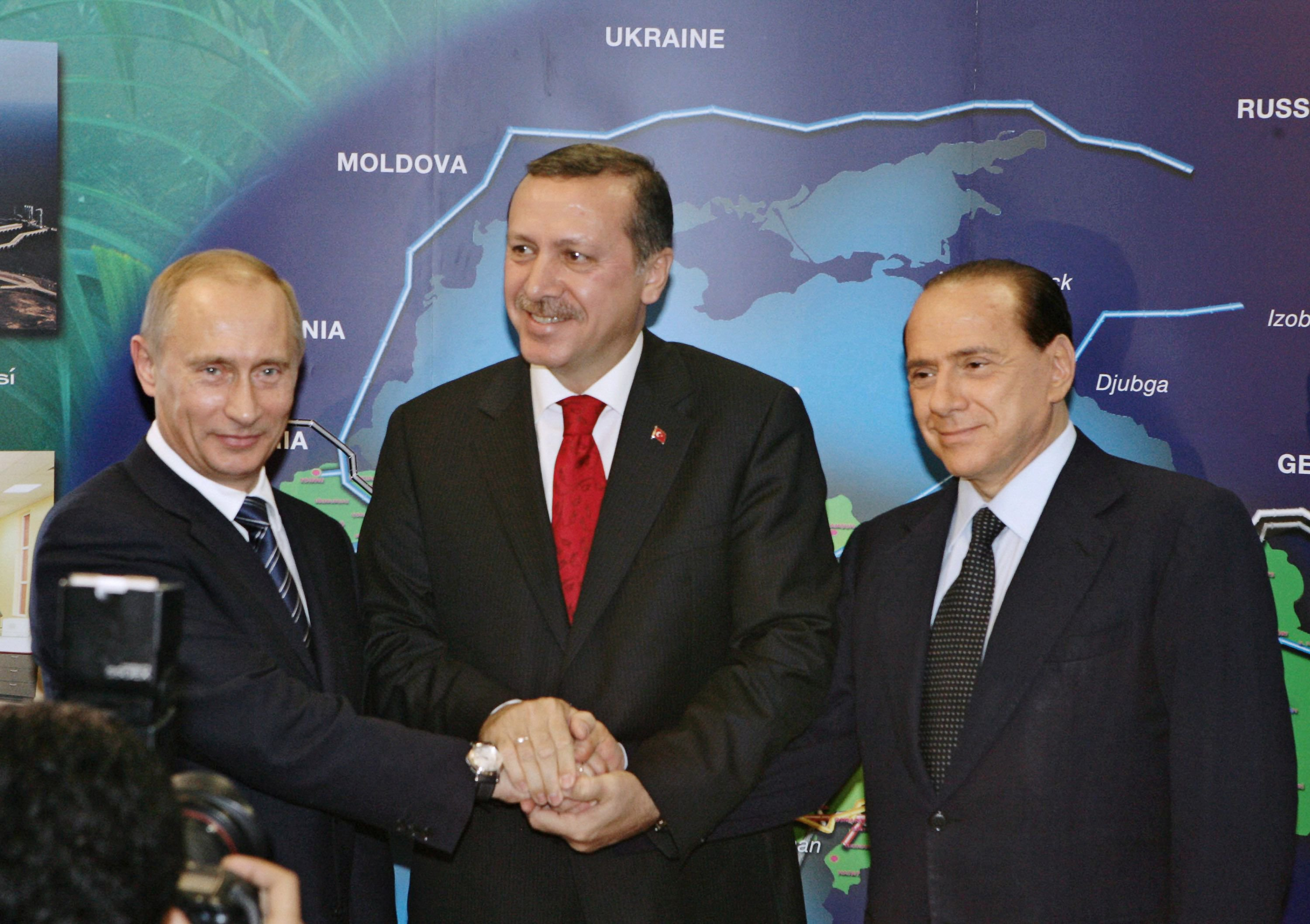
From left to right: Vladimir Putin, Recep Tayyip Erdoğan, and Silvio Berlusconi, at the opening of a gas pipeline

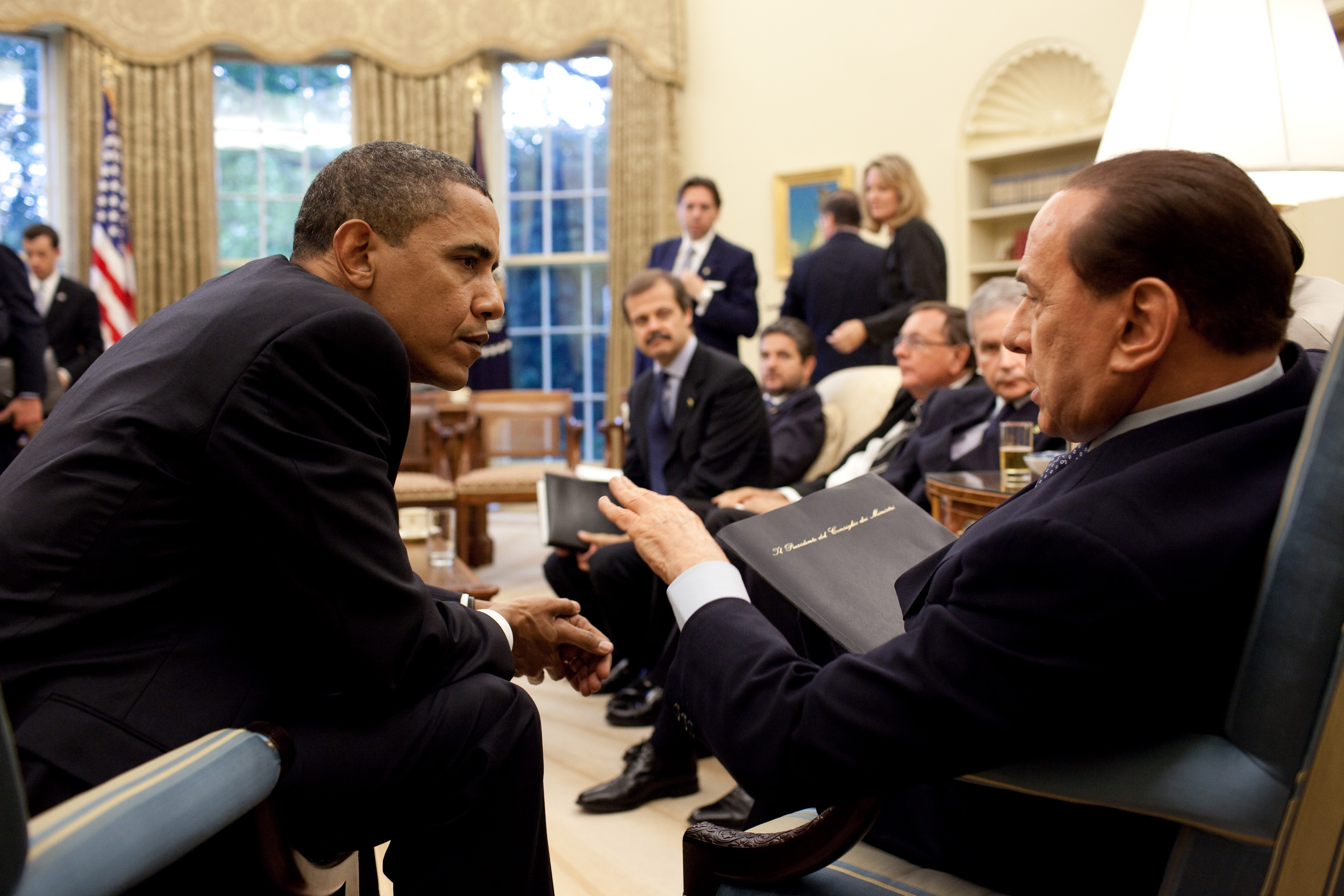
US President Barack Obama meets Silvio Berlusconi in the Oval Office of the White House

Berlusconi and his cabinets have had a strong tendency to support American foreign policies, despite the policy divide between the U.S. and many founding members of the European Union (Germany, France, Belgium) during the Bush administration. Under his lead the Italian Government also shifted its traditional position on foreign policy from being the most pro-Arab western government towards a greater friendship with Israel and Turkey (Silvio Berlusconi acted as wedding witness for the son of the Turkish Prime Minister Recep Tayyip Erdoğan in 2003) than in the past, hence rebalancing relations with all the Mediterranean countries to reach equal closeness with them. Berlusconi is one of the strongest supporters of Turkey's application to accede to the European Union. In order to support Turkey's application the Italian Premier invited Prime Minister Erdoğan to take part in a meeting of the European leaders of Denmark, France, Germany, the Netherlands, Spain, Sweden, and the United Kingdom, gathered in L'Aquila for the 2009 G8 summit. Italy, with Berlusconi in office, became a solid ally of the United States due to his support in deploying Italian troops in the War in Afghanistan and the Iraq War following the 2003 invasion of Iraq in the war on terror.

Berlusconi, in his meetings with United Nations Secretary-General Kofi Annan and U.S. President George W. Bush, said that he pushed for "a clear turnaround in the Iraqi situation" and for a quick handover of sovereignty to the government chosen by the Iraqi people. By the end of Berlusconi's administration, Italy had some 2,700 troops deployed in Southern Iraq. Italian troops were gradually withdrawn from Iraq in the second half of 2006 with the last soldiers leaving the country in December of the same year in the Romano Prodi government administration.

=== Relations with Russia ===
The cabinets chaired by Silvio Berlusconi have enhanced and strengthened the ties between Italy and Russia, which were already substantial in the Soviet Union period because during the Cold War Italy had the strongest communist party in western Europe. Vladimir Putin has many times expressed his appreciation for the respect shown by the Italian Prime Minister towards the leadership of the Russian Federation. Silvio Berlusconi is among the most vocal supporters of closer ties between Russia and the European Union. In an article published to Italian media on 26 May 2002, he said that the next step in Russia's growing integration with the West should be EU membership. On 17 November 2005 he commented in regards to the prospect of such a membership that he is "convinced that even if it is a dream ... it is not too distant a dream and I think it will happen one day." The Prime Minister of Italy has made similar comments on other occasions as well.

=== Cooperation with Libya ===
On 30 August 2008, the Libyan leader Muammar al-Gaddafi and Berlusconi signed a historic cooperation treaty in Benghazi. Under its terms, Italy will pay $5 billion to Libya as compensation for its former military occupation. In exchange, Libya will take measures to combat illegal immigration coming from its shores and boost investments in Italian companies. The treaty was ratified by Italy on 6 February 2009, and by Libya on 2 March, during a visit to Tripoli by Berlusconi. In June Gaddafi made his first visit to Rome, where he met Prime Minister Berlusconi, Italian President of the Republic Giorgio Napolitano and Senate's Speaker Renato Schifani. Gaddafi also took part in the G8 summit in L'Aquila in July as Chairman of the African Union. During the summit a warm handshake between US President Barack Obama and Muammar Gaddafi took place (the first time the Libyan leader has been greeted by a serving US president), then at summit's official dinner offered by President Giorgio Napolitano US and Libyan leaders upset the ceremony and sat by the Italian Prime Minister and G8 host, Silvio Berlusconi. (According to ceremony's orders Gaddafi should seat three places after Berlusconi)

However, when Gaddafi faced a civil war in 2011, Italy imposed a freeze on some Libyan assets linked to him and his family, pursuant to a United Nations-sponsored regime and then bombed the country with the violation of Libya of the No-Fly Zone. Despite this, Berlusconi remained personally opposed to the intervention, arguing that "this wasn't a popular uprising because Gaddafi was loved by his people, as I was able to see when I went to Libya." After the death of Gaddafi, Italy recognized the National Transitional Council as the government of Libya.

=== Cooperation with the Western Balkans ===
On 5 April 2009 at the EU-USA summit in Prague Silvio Berlusconi proposed an 8-point road map to accelerate the Euro-Atlantic integration of the western Balkans. During that summit the Italian Foreign Minister Franco Frattini urged his European colleagues to send "visible and concrete" signs to the countries concerned (Serbia, Kosovo, Bosnia, Montenegro, Croatia, Macedonia, and Albania).

The first point concerns the liberalisation of visas between the EU and the Western Balkans. The Italian Government hopes that liberalisation can begin between late 2009 and early 2010, with priority being given to Serbia and Macedonia. The second point calls upon the European Commission to prepare a technical report on Montenegro's accession to EU, which will be followed by those of Serbia and Albania, while the third point urges completion of Croatia's EU accession process by the end of 2010. The fourth point regards strengthening the role of the EU High Representative for Bosnia Herzegovina Valentin Inzko. The fifth calls for the entrance into effect of the Association and Stabilisation Agreement with Serbia, which, in turn, is to collaborate fully with the Hague Tribunal for the former Yugoslavia. The sixth point calls for the rapid resolution of the dispute putting Skopje against Athens over the name "Macedonia". The seventh point concerns Italy's insistence on the importance of economic support for the young Republic of Kosovo. The Eighth point requests for an EU-Balkans summit, enlarged to the United States, to be held by mid-2010.

== Legislative actions ==
From 2001 to 2006, Berlusconi's parliamentary majority passed many pieces of legislation, including:

- The law on large public works: the "Highways on the sea" project, high speed railways connecting Turin-Milan-Florence-Rome-Naples and Turin-Verona-Venice; the MOSE project to save the city of Venice; the Messina Bridge between Sicily and mainland Italy; the underground in Rome, Parma, Naples, Turin, Milan; modernisation of highways and water structures in southern Italy.
- The reform of the labour system, with the so-called "legge 30" or "legge Biagi" (named after the Italian professor of labour law killed by the communist terrorist group Red Brigades due to his role as economic advisor to the Berlusconi administration) promoting labour flexibility for new workers
- The new pensions law, issued in July 2004, raising the minimum age for retirement and adding incentives for delayed retirement. The so-called "Maroni Reform", named after the former Minister of Welfare, would have gradually raised the retirement age. Before the reform came into force in 2008, it was stopped by the newly elected centre-left government. Instead of 60 years, the minimum age was reduced again to 58 years.
- The reform of the school system, called "riforma Moratti", named after the former Minister of Education, Universities and Research. It was quickly put under revision by the centre-left government when Romano Prodi returned to power.
- The reform of rules regarding drivers' licenses, which led to a significant decrease in car accidents, in particular lethal ones, according to the Italian police department.
- The harsh "Article 41-bis prison regime" for Mafia leaders. It was made a permanent provision. Under previous law, it had to be renewed every two years.
- Abolition of donation and inheritance taxes. It was reinstated by the subsequent government of Romano Prodi.
- The banning of smoking in offices, bars, restaurants and all closed public places, which went into effect in January 2005.
- The Urbani decree, named after the Ministro per i beni e le attività culturali Giuliano Urbani, punishing anyone who circulated, even via file sharing software, a film or other copyrighted material or part of it, or enjoyed it with the same technology, with a 1,500 € fine, the confiscation of the instruments and material, and the publication of the measure on a national daily paper and a periodical about shows. The decree was later modified by the parliament to include only copyright violation for the purpose of profit, where "profit" includes the savings due to not buying the software. The Court of Cassation, however, ruled that "profit" only means an actual "significant monetary profit".
- A tax increase on blank data storage devices (considered as a means for digital piracy) to finance the intellectual property agency Siae. This was required by a European Union directive, but the fee in Italy is much higher than in most other EU countries, up to a 60% increase in price. ASMI, the association of digital supports producers, filed a complaint against Siae, reporting a 40% decrease in sales.
- A law regulating artificial insemination, banning research on embryonic stem cells, pre-implant diagnosis and insemination by donors other than the husband, forcing women to be implanted after the embryo creation even in case of genetic diseases, recognising the embryo as entitled to human rights. The abrogation of the most controversial items has been the object of an unsuccessful popular referendum called in June 2005 by former allies such as the Italian Radicals, together with some (but not all) parties of L'Unione.
- The reform of electoral law. The First Past the Post system, which had been approved by popular vote in a 1993 referendum, was replaced by a proportional representation system, with a majority prize for the winning coalition. (See also the section "Electoral System" in Parliament of Italy).

Other laws were particularly controversial, the opposition considering them to be for the benefit of Berlusconi and his partners:

- The Gasparri Law, new media reform legislation replacing the Mammì Law. Among other things, such legislation increased the maximum limit on an individual's share of the media market, allowing Berlusconi to retain control of his three national TV channels (one of which was still using a frequency which by law should have gone to another channel). The legislation also enabled the roll-out of digital television and internet based publishing, and hence his government claimed it resolved the problem of conflict of interest and his media monopoly "by opening up more channels". The law was initially vetoed by the President of the Republic, Carlo Azeglio Ciampi, on charges of being unconstitutional. After being slightly modified, the law was adopted on 3 May 2004.
- A much shorter statute of limitation for most crimes, coupled with an increase in sanctions for repeat offenders. The opposition argued that this law was designed to save a close friend of Berlusconi, Cesare Previti, from corruption charges; however, after modifications in parliament, Previti was excluded from the benefits of this law. However, the Italian Constitutional Court had to abolish this exclusion on the grounds of equality of all citizens before the law, so Previti did benefit from this law.
- The suspension of criminal trials against the five highest officers of the state during their terms: the so-called "Lodo Maccanico", or "Lodo Schifani". It was declared unconstitutional in 2004 by the Constitutional Court. In July 2008, a similar bill, named the "Lodo Alfano", was approved by the parliament. Under the act, immunity was guaranteed for the four highest public servants. (the President of the Republic, the Speakers of the Houses of Parliament, and the Prime Minister). In October 2009, the Lodo Alfano was also declared unconstitutional.
- The decriminalization of false account statements and their punishment with administrative fines, only if there is a specific damaged party reporting the fact to the authorities and if the alteration is less than 5% of profits or 1% of total assets; otherwise it is still a crime, punishable by up to six years of prison.

In the last few weeks before the April 2006 general election, Berlusconi's parliamentary majority approved many disputed bills. For example, a bill for the Winter Olympics also included controversial provisions tightening penalties for drug use and peddling. Another was a penal code reform forbidding prosecutors to appeal against acquittals (defendants could still appeal, though). This law was not signed by President Carlo Azeglio Ciampi, but eventually went through both houses of parliament again, forcing the head of state to sign it. The law was declared unconstitutional by the Constitutional Court, since the constitution of Italy provides for equal rights for prosecutors and defendants.
