= Bongo-Bongo =

Name for an imaginary language in linguistics

In linguistics, Bongo-Bongo is used as a name for an imaginary language. It is most commonly invoked in etymological studies to conceptualize random similarities between unrelated languages. It has also been used as a name for a constructed language invented by John Lyons as a teaching tool in linguistics.

== Etymological studies ==
Many entirely coincidental word similarities have been documented and regularly occur between languages regardless of how related or unrelated the languages may be; these are commonly disregarded in the academic study of etymology. The widespread unscientific habit to look for such coincidental similarities (false etymologies) and proclaim them as proof of genetic relationship (pseudoscientific language comparison) has given rise to the term Bongo-Bongo approach or Bongo-Bongo effect. For example, when comparing random surface forms in Basque and Hungarian (which are known to be unrelated languages), "pairings" such as Basque hegi 'ridge' and Hungarian hegy 'hill' are easily found but ultimately meaningless in terms of etymology without additional historical linguistic research and data in regards to their origin. It could be just as easily argued that the two developed independently in their respective languages, being words that use sounds common to all human languages for a common object or idea.

== In anthropology ==
The concept can also be found occasionally in anthropology, where the Bongo-Bongo are sarcastically used as an imaginary tribe or ethnicity (or by extension, the pejorative term Bongo Bongo Land).
