= Gian Franco Anedda =

Italian politician (1930–2020)

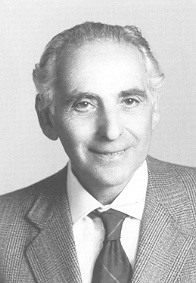
Gian Franco Anedda

Gian Franco Anedda (28 August 1930 – 17 July 2020) was an Italian politician.

Anedda was born in Cagliari on 28 August 1930. He studied and practiced law before his election to the Cagliari municipal council and the Regional Council of Sardinia. Anedda began his political career affiliated with the Italian Social Movement, and later joined its successor, the National Alliance. Anedda won election to the Chamber of Deputies for the first time in 1992, and served through 2006. Between 1994 and 1995, Anedda served as undersecretary of the Ministry of Justice. He was elected a lay member of the High Council of the Judiciary in 2005. Anedda died on 17 July 2020.
