= John Martin =

John Martin may refer to:

== Business ==
- John Martin (businessman) (1820–1905), American lumberman and flour miller
- John Charles Martin (1882–1966), American newspaper publisher
- John Martin (publisher) (1930–2025), American founder of Black Sparrow Press
- John C. Martin (businessman) (1951–2021), American CEO of biotechnology company Gilead Sciences

== Entertainment ==
- John Martin (actor) (born 1951), American actor
- John Martin (painter) (1789–1854), English painter
- John Martin (Canadian artist) (1904–1965), British-Canadian etcher and textile printer
- John Blennerhassett Martin (1797–1857), American painter, engraver, and lithographer
- John Martin (bibliographer) (1791–1855), English bookseller, librarian, and writer
- John Martin (dance critic) (1893–1985), at The New York Times
- John Scott Martin (1926–2009), English actor
- John Martin (Canadian broadcaster) (1947–2006)
- John Martin (comedian) (born 1962), British
- John Martin (singer) (born 1980), Swedish
- John Martin (born 1946), also known as "The Big Figure", English drummer and member of Dr. Feelgood (1971–1982)
- John Martin, American film actor, in Browned Off (1944) and Mesa of Lost Women (1951)
- John Martin, Norwegian musician, husband and manager of pianist Natalia Strelchenko

== Law ==
- John Martin (judge) (1784–1840), American judge of the Cherokee Tribal Court
- John C. Martin (judge) (1943–2024), North Carolina state court judge
- John Donelson Martin Sr. (1883–1962), U.S. federal judge
- John E. Martin (1891–1968), Wisconsin state court judge
- John S. Martin Jr. (born 1935), U.S. federal judge

== Military ==
- John Donelson Martin (1830–1862), Confederate States Army officer during the American Civil War
- John Martin (Royal Navy officer) (1918–2011), British admiral
- John Henry Martin (c. 1753–1823), Royal Navy officer
- John Martin (New Zealand admiral), chief of the Royal New Zealand Navy
- John L. Martin Jr. (1920–2009) US Air Force general
- John Martin (soldier) (1921–2012), Tahitian soldier and linguist

== Politics ==
=== United Kingdom ===
- John Martin (MP for Berwick-upon-Tweed), British member of parliament for Berwick-upon-Tweed, 1529
- John Martin (died 1545), British member of parliament for Plympton Erle, 1529
- John Martin (died c. 1592), British member of parliament for Plympton Erle, 1554
- John Martin (1692–1767), British member of parliament for Tewkesbury, 1741–1747
- John Martin (1724–1794), British member of parliament for Tewkesbury, 1754–1761
- John Martin (1805–1880), British banker and member of parliament for Tewkesbury, 1832–1835
- John Martin (Young Irelander) (1812–1875), Young Irelander and member of parliament for Meath, 1871–1875
- John Hanbury Martin (1890–1983), British member of parliament for Southwark Central, 1940–1948
- John Martin (civil servant) (1904–1991), Winston Churchill's private secretary
- John Martin (Leicester MP), British member of parliament for Leicester, 1354
- John Martin, bailiff of Guernsey, 1499–1510
- John Martin (1774–1832), British member of parliament for Tewkesbury, 1812–1832
- John Martin (Irish politician), Irish member of parliament for the Irish constituency of Sligo Borough, 1832–1837

=== United States ===
- John Martin (governor of Georgia) (1732–1786)
- John Martin (governor of Kansas) (1839–1889)
- John Martin (Kansas politician) (1833–1913), U.S. senator from Kansas
- John Andrew Martin (1868–1939), U.S. representative from Colorado
- John C. Martin (politician) (1880–1952), U.S. representative from Illinois
- John F. Martin Jr., American ambassador to Costa Rica (1920–1921)
- John L. Martin (born 1941), American politician from Maine
- John Marshall Martin (1832–1921), Confederate politician
- John Mason Martin (1837–1898), U.S. representative from Alabama
- John Preston Martin (1811–1862), U.S. representative from Kentucky
- John W. Martin (1884–1958), governor of Florida
- John Martin (pioneer) (1827–1893), early pioneer of Monterey County, California
- John Martin (Missouri politician) (born 1968/9)

=== Other countries ===
- John Wills Martin (c. 1790–after 1843), English-born merchant and political figure in Newfoundland
- John Martin (New Zealand politician) (1822–1892), member of the New Zealand Legislative Council
- John S. Martin (politician) (1855–1946), politician in Prince Edward Island, Canada
- John Strickler Martin (1875–1931), farmer and politician in Ontario, Canada
- John Martin (Australian politician) (1890–1964), New South Wales politician
- John Martin (British Columbia politician) (born 1958/9), MLA of a provincial legislature since 2013

== Sports ==
=== Baseball ===
- John Martin (baseball) (born 1956), American baseball pitcher
- J. D. Martin (John Dale Martin, born 1983), Major League Baseball pitcher
- Pepper Martin (Johnny 1904–1965), American baseball player

=== Cricket ===
- John Martin (cricketer, born 1846) (1846–1922, English cricketer and barrister
- John Martin (cricketer, born 1867) (1867–1942), played for MCC and Devon
- John Martin (cricketer, born 1941) (1941–2024), played for Oxford University, Somerset, Oxfordshire, and Devon
- John Martin (cricketer, born 1942), played for New South Wales
- Johnny Martin (cricketer) (1931–1992), Australian Test cricketer

=== Football ===
- John Martin (American football) (1895–?), American football player and coach
- Johnny Martin (American football) (1916–1968)
- Alan Martin (footballer, born 1923) (John Alan 1923–2004), English footballer
- Johnny Martin (footballer) (1946–2013), English former footballer
- John Martin (goalkeeper) (born 1958), Scottish goalkeeper for Airdrieonians
- John Martin (Irish footballer) (born 1979), midfielder
- John Martin (footballer, born 1999) (born 1999), Irish footballer
- John Martin (English footballer) (born 1981)
- John Martin (footballer, born 1985) (born 1985), Scottish footballer
- John Martin (referee) (fl. 1978–1988), English association football referee

=== Other sports ===
- John Martin (American racing driver) (1939–2019), Indy 500 driver
- John Martin (Australian racing driver) (born 1984), Superleague Formula and British F3
- John Martin (figure skater), 1989–1994
- John Martin (Paralympian) (born 1943), Australian
- John Martin (rugby league) (born 1948), English rugby league footballer
- John Martin (sport shooter) (1868–1951)
- John David Martin (born 1939), American track and field athlete
- Skeets Martin (John Henry Martin, 1875–1944), American jockey

== Other ==
- John Martin (Jamestown) (c. 1560–1632), settler and member of Council
- John Martin (meteorologist) (1789–1869), English physician and meteorologist
- John Martin (minister) (1741–1820), English Particular Baptist minister
- John Martin (priest) (1797–1878), Anglican priest in Ireland
- John Martin (headmaster) (1814–1876), educator in Adelaide, South Australia
- John Martin (oceanographer) (1935–1993), American scientist
- John Bartlow Martin (1915–1987), American author and ambassador
- John F. Martin, deputy supreme knight of the Knights of Columbus, 1927–1933
- John Jeffries Martin (born 1951), American academic and author
- John Joseph Martin (1922–1997), NASA engineer and administrator
- John Levi Martin (born 1964), American sociologist
- John William Martin (1860–1956), British Fabian and academic in the United States
- John Martin, American member of the Committee of Fifty
- John Martin, captain of Bartholomew Gosnold's ship when he found Martha's Vineyard
- John Martin's, former department store in Adelaide, Australia
- John Martin Brewery, Belgian brewery founded in 1909
- John Martin Scripps, or John Martin, British-Singaporean killer, later executed
- John Biddulph Martin, president of the Royal Statistical Society, 1896–1897
- John D. Martin (author) (born 1945), American finance and business author and professor
- John Francis Ryde Martin (1943–1999), British diplomat

== See also ==
- Jon Martín (born 2006), Spanish footballer
- J. Thomas Marten (born 1951), United States federal judge
- Jack Martin (disambiguation)
- John B. Martin (disambiguation)
- John D. Martin (disambiguation)
- John Martyn (disambiguation)
- Jonathan Martin (disambiguation)
- John Martinis (disambiguation)
