= Berlusconism =

Term used to describe the political positions of Silvio Berlusconi

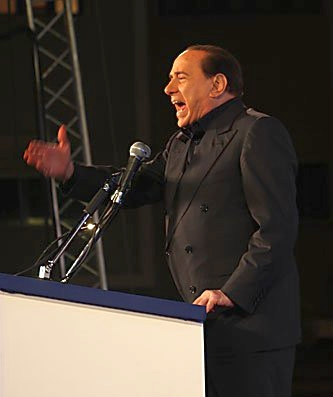
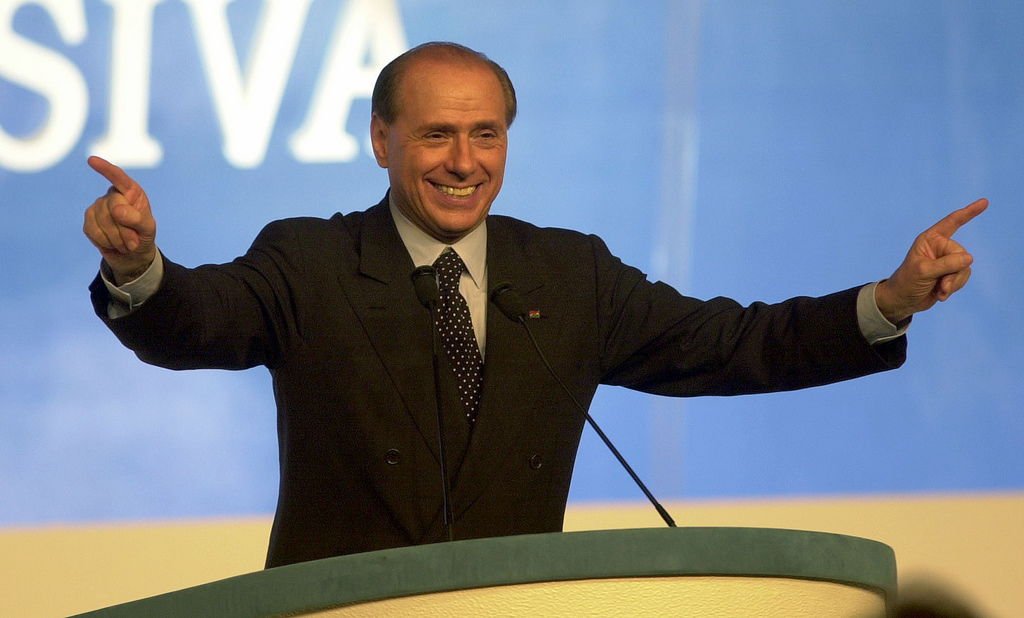
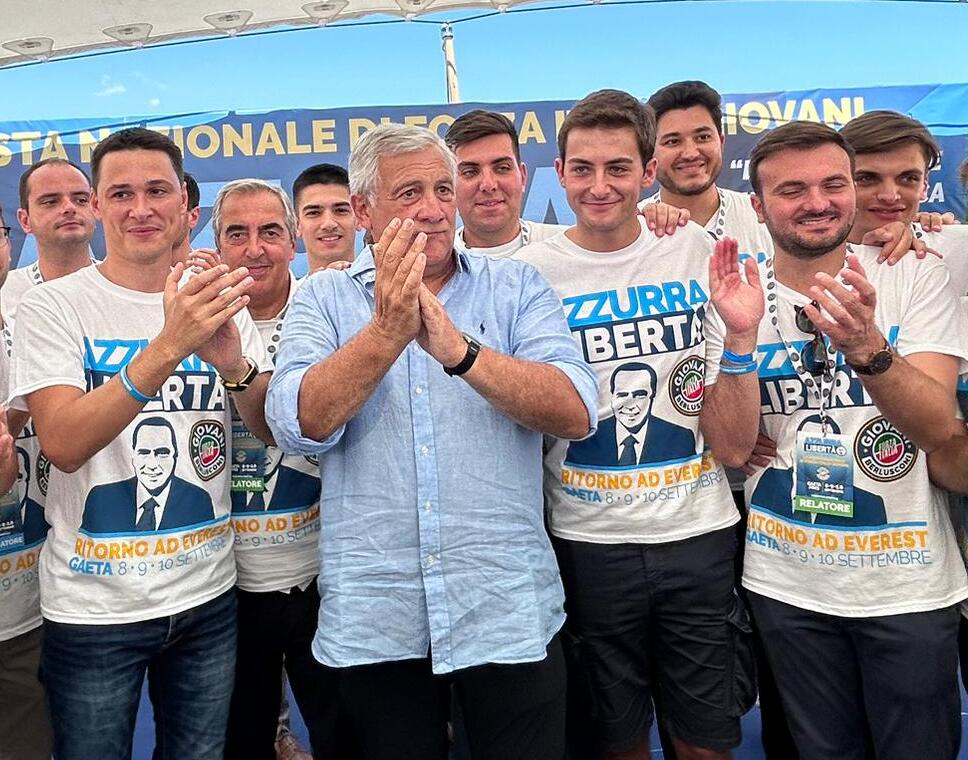
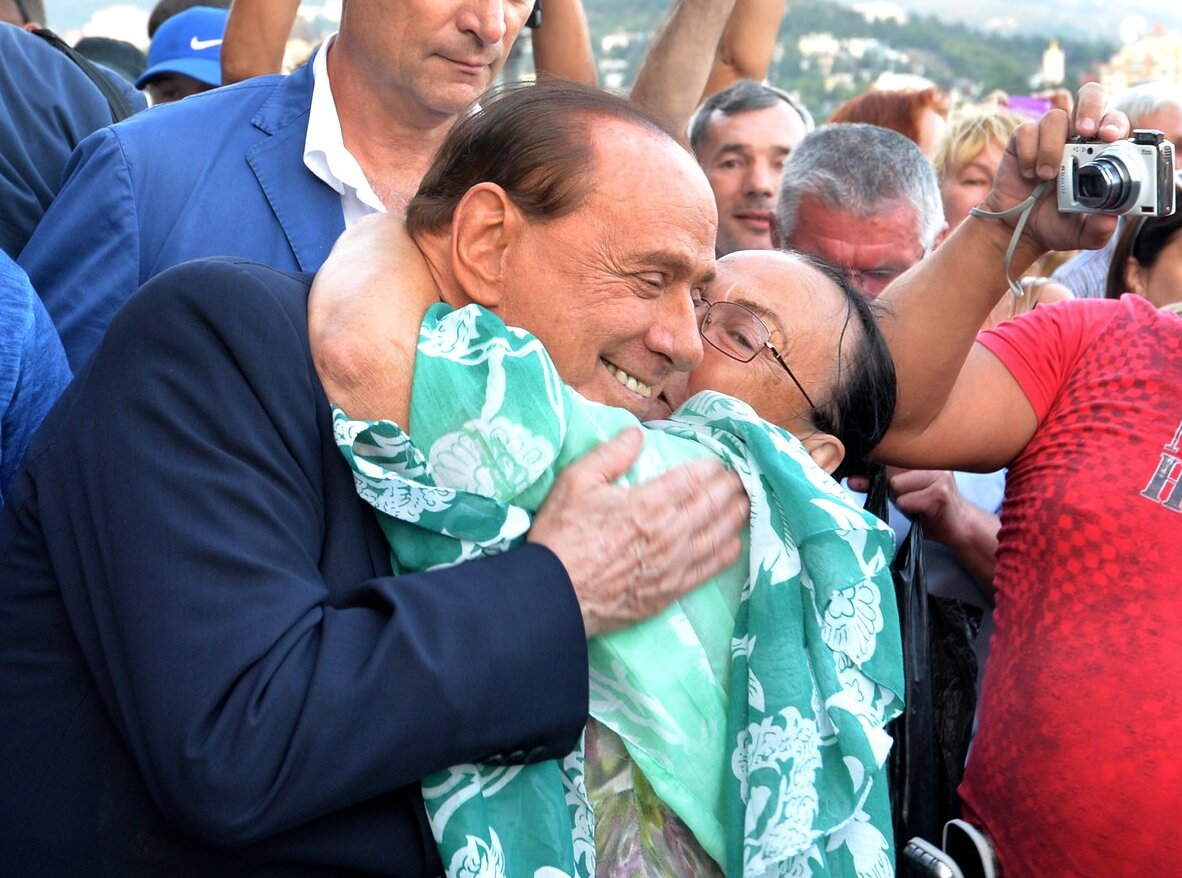
From left to right, top to bottom:
- Berlusconi in 2008 during a rally
- Berlusconi speaking at a Forza Italia meeting in 2005
- Antonio Tajani with FI Youth members wearing t-shirts featuring an image of Berlusconi
- Berlusconi among supporters during a trip in Crimea

Berlusconism (Italian: berlusconismo) was a term used in the Western media and by some Italian analysts to describe the political positions of former prime minister Silvio Berlusconi. In general, Berlusconism could be reassumed as a mix of conservatism, populism, liberalism, and anti-communism.

Other observers described it as more of a personality-driven populist movement, where "a billionaire businessman and television personality" pledges to use his unique skills to "represent the interests of ordinary people" against the political establishment; and where the "scandals, investigations, and trials" that follow him were dismissed by his passionately loyal base of supporters as evidence that he was "the most persecuted" person in history.

== Origins and features ==
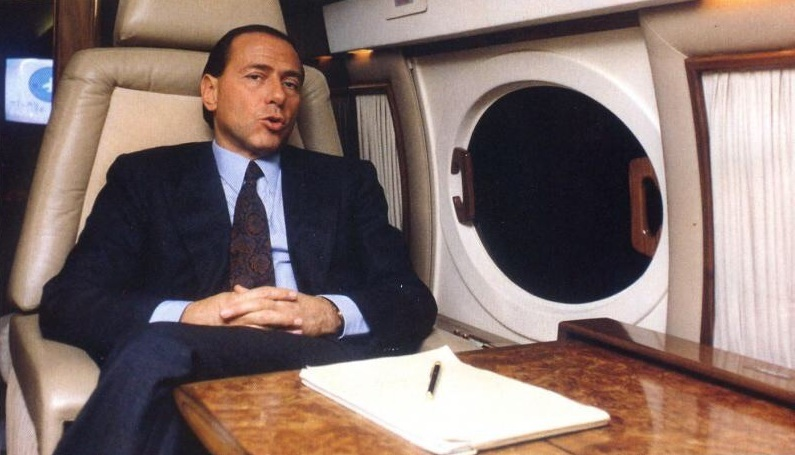
Berlusconi in his private jet aircraft in the 1980s

The term "Berlusconism" dates back to the 1980s, when Silvio Berlusconi was an entrepreneur not yet engaged in politics. At the time, it was used with a strongly positive connotation as a synonym for entrepreneurial optimism, referring to a business-minded spirit that is not discouraged by difficulties and remains confident in its ability to solve problems. Following Berlusconi's entry into politics in January 1994, the term underwent a significant shift in meaning within journalistic and political discourse.

Logo of House of Freedoms coalition, with Berlusconi's name prominently featured in the center.

According to the Italian definition given by the online vocabulary of the Encyclopedia Institute, Berlusconism has a wide range of meanings, all having their origins in the figure of Berlusconi and the political movement inspired by him: the substantive refers not only to the "thought movement", but also to the "social phenomenon" and even the phenomenon "of custom" bound to his entrepreneurial and political figure. The term Berlusconism is also used to refer to a certain laissez-faire vision supported by him, not only of the economy and the markets but also with reference to the same policy.

The emergence of Berlusconism as a social and political phenomenon has been linked by some analysts to the so-called "Italian anomaly", namely the coexistence of structural weaknesses affecting various aspects of Italian life, from society to politics and the economy (such as political patronage, clientelism, nepotism, and double standards). According to one scholar of contemporary Italian history, this relationship should be understood in the sense that Berlusconism is an expression and consequence of this anomaly, rather than its cause. In a similarly critical and broad sense, the term has been used by political scientist and historian Marco Revelli, former co-founder of Lotta Continua, to denote a style of politics and an underlying culture of self-legitimized wealth that permeates large segments of the nation, including much of the center-left leadership. In Revelli's analysis, there is an explicit parallel with the description of fascism as the "autobiography of the nation" by anti-fascist thinker Piero Gobetti, insofar as the movement of Benito Mussolini and Berlusconi himself would represent the most visible manifestations of deeply rooted negative tendencies within Italian society. French writer and journalist Jacques Martin wrote in an article published in The Guardian in 2006: "Berlusconism is the most serious attack on Western democracy since 1945; a phenomenon that cannot be ignored."

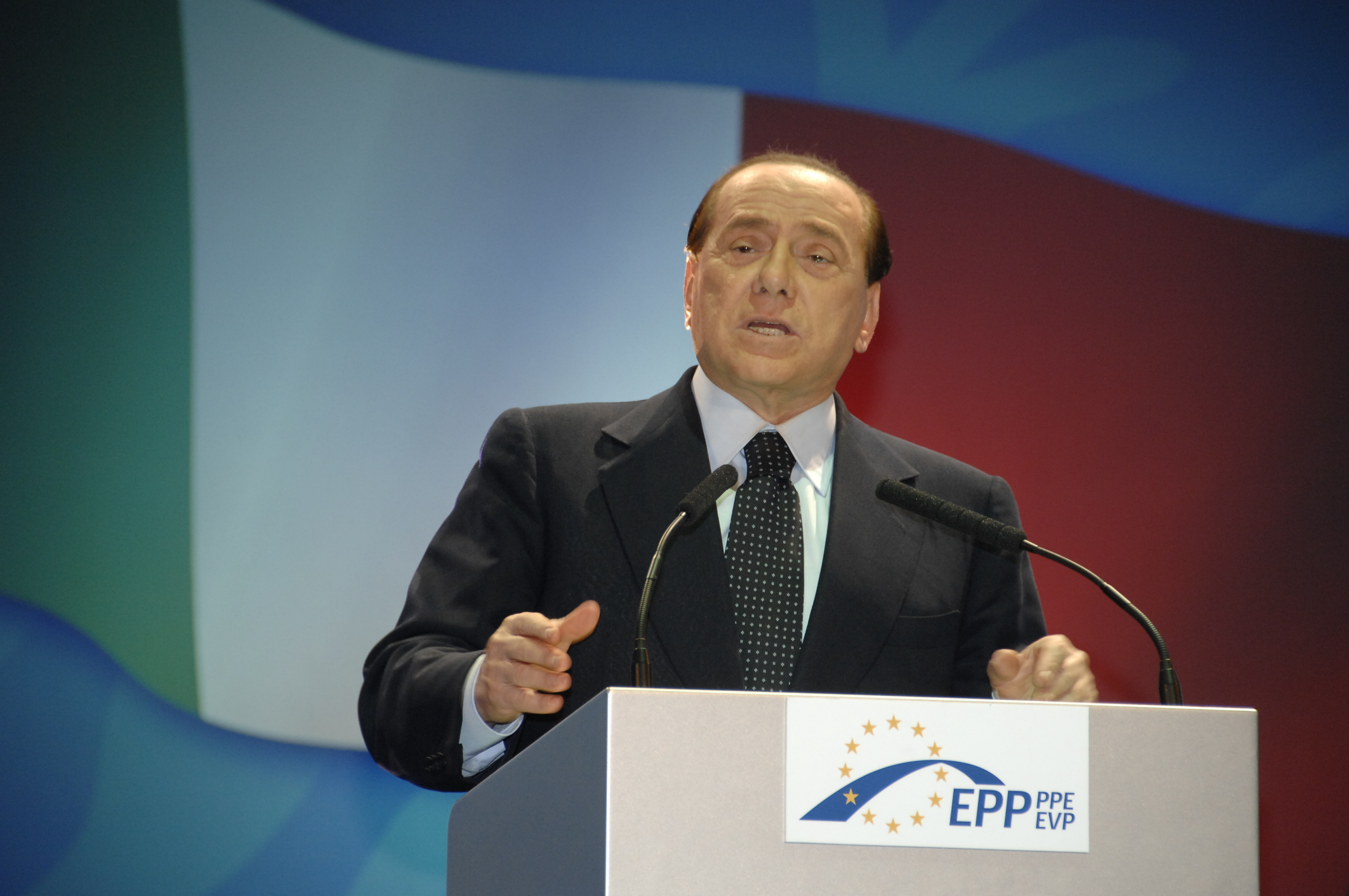
Berlusconi speaking at the EPP congress in Warsaw

According to his political opponents and business rivals, Berlusconism is only a form of demagogic populism, comparable to fascism, stressing the fact that Berlusconi declared his admiration for Benito Mussolini, although he criticised the racial Fascist laws and the alliance with Nazi Germany, referring to himself as pro-Israel. In 2013, he returned to calling Mussolini a good leader whose biggest mistake was signing up to exterminate the Jews. His supporters instead compare Berlusconism to the French Gaullism and the Argentine Peronism.

In January 2007, Berlusconism was the subject of a conference organized by the Liberal Foundation, close to Forza Italia, with the aim of reclaiming the term in a particularly positive light. In a letter sent on 27 September 2008 by Sandro Bondi (Minister for Culture in the fourth Berlusconi government) to the newspaper la Repubblica, he wrote: "The so-called Berlusconism was first and foremost a response to the crisis of the Italian political system, which coincided with the fall of the Berlin Wall and with Tangentopoli, and with the recognition of the inability/impossibility of the Italian Communist Party (PCI) to transform itself into a genuinely reformist and European-style political force. Secondly, Berlusconism has represented and continues to represent the highest attempt to modernize the economic and institutional structures of our country, based not on an ideology, but on a system of genuinely liberal and reformist values, which have also influenced European politics as a whole."

== Political positions ==
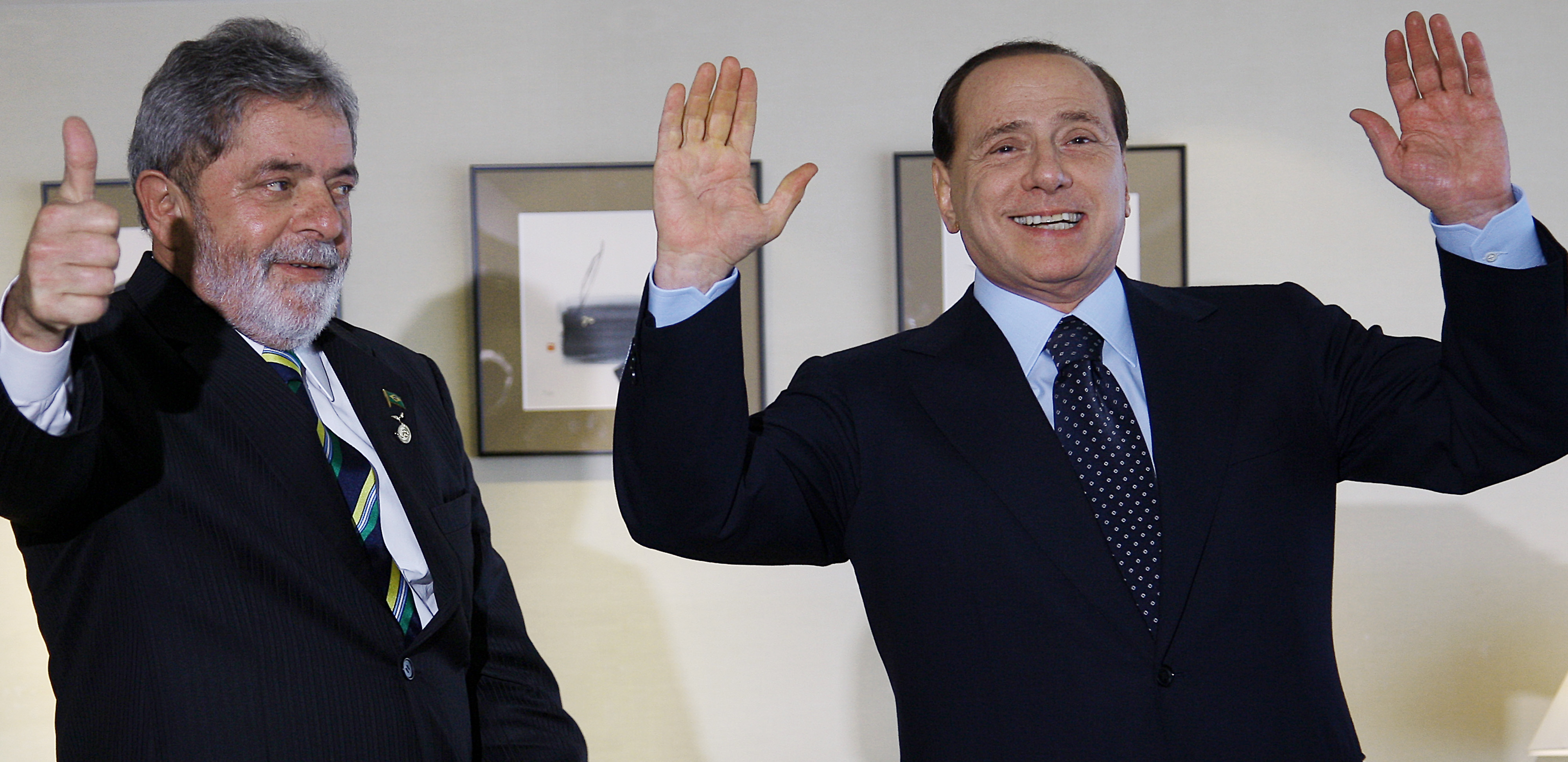
Berlusconi joking with Brazilian President Luiz Inácio Lula da Silva. Jokes and gestures became key parts of his communicative style.

Berlusconi defined himself and by extension Berlusconism as moderate, liberal and pro-free trade (liberismo), but he was often also described as a populist or a conservative leader. Berlusconism was also described as liberal-conservative, or conservative-liberal, but he was sometimes associated with right-wing populism. After his resignation in 2011, Berlusconi became increasingly Eurosceptical and he was often critical of German Chancellor Angela Merkel.

A feature of Berlusconi's leadership tactics was to use the party as a means to gain power (with the party described as a "light party" because of its lack of a complex internal structure). This is decidedly comparable to the political tactics used by Charles de Gaulle in France. Another feature of great importance is the emphasis on a "liberal revolution", publicised and summarised by the "Contract with the Italians" of 2001. A strong reformism was added to these pillars, principally of the form of the Italian state and the constitution in favour of moving from a parliamentary system to a semi-presidential system, a higher election threshold, the abolition of the Senate, the halving in size of the Chamber of Deputies, the abolition of the provinces and the reform of the judiciary, with separation of the careers between magistrates and magistrates's civil responsibility, by Berlusconi considered impartial. Berlusconi declared himself to be persecuted by the judiciary, having undergone 34 processes, accusing them of being manipulated by the political left and comparing himself to Enzo Tortora as a victim of a miscarriage of justice. More recently, Berlusconi declared himself in favour of civil unions.

During his long-time tenure, many critics claimed that a new kind of cult of personality was in place, favored by Berlusconi's three national television networks and newspapers. Moreover, the hymn of Berlusconi's movements was Meno male che Silvio c'è, literally "Thank goodness for Silvio". In addition to that, Berlusconi often described himself as the Jesus Christ of Italian politics. These attitudes were seen by public opinion as clear examples of the new political style that Berlusconi brought into Italy, focused on the leader's charisma, cult of personality and media domination.

== Comparisons to other leaders ==
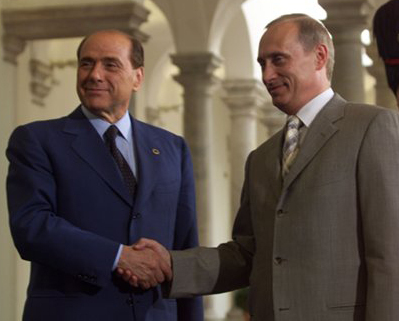
Berlusconi with Vladimir Putin in 2001. The two leaders shared a close personal relationship.

A number of writers and political commentators consider Berlusconi's political success a precedent for the 2016 election of real estate tycoon Donald Trump as the 45th president of the United States, with most noting Berlusconi's panned prime minister tenure and therefore making the comparison in dismay. Roger Cohen of The New York Times argued: "Widely ridiculed, endlessly written about, long unscathed by his evident misogyny and diverse legal travails, Berlusconi proved a Teflon politician. [...] Nobody who knows Berlusconi and has watched the rise and rise of Donald Trump can fail to be struck by the parallels." In The Daily Beast, Barbie Latza Nadeau wrote: "If Americans are wondering just what a Trump presidency would look like, they only need to look at the traumatized remains of Italy after Berlusconi had his way."During the 2016 United States election, Politico described Berlusconi as the closest parallel to Trump in a historical world leader. In a piece written for Slate and published in April 2017, Lorenzo Newman noted the similarities in the career trajectories between the two.

In 2015, Andrej Babiš, the then Finance Minister and future Prime Minister of the Czech Republic, was compared to Berlusconi due to his media ownership, business activities, political influence, and legal problems with a prison sentence hanging over him. Foreign Policy drew parallels between the two, labelling Babiš with the nickname "Babisconi". British historian Perry Anderson wrote that, despite Berlusconi's reputation as an enfant terrible of the European right, his actual policy record places him "to the left of Bill Clinton, who built much of his career in America on policies—delivering executions in Arkansas, scything welfare in Washington—that would be unthinkable for any Prime Minister in Italy". Opponents have been critical of Nabil Karoui's consolidation of the Tunisian media landscape and the intentions of his charitable activities, often referring to him as the "Tunisian Berlusconi". Other mass media owners like Cem Uzan or Pavol Rusko have been compared to him.
