= Contract with America =

1994 Republican Party legislative agenda

The Contract with America was a legislative agenda advocated by the Republican Party during the 1994 congressional election campaign. Written by Newt Gingrich and Dick Armey, and in part using text from former president Ronald Reagan's 1985 State of the Union Address, the contract detailed the actions the Republicans promised to take if they became the majority party in the United States House of Representatives for the first time in 40 years. Many of the contract's policy ideas originated at the Heritage Foundation, a conservative think tank.

The Contract with America was introduced six weeks before the 1994 congressional election, the first midterm election of President Bill Clinton's administration, and was signed by all but two of the Republican members of the House and all of the party's non-incumbent Republican congressional candidates.

The contract described the plan of the congressional representatives, seeking to nationalize the congressional election. Its provisions represented the view of many conservative Republicans on the issues of reducing the size of government, cutting taxes, and both tort reform and welfare reform.

The 1994 elections resulted in Republicans gaining 54 House and 8 U.S. Senate seats, flipping both chambers. The contract was seen as a triumph by party leaders such as Minority Whip Newt Gingrich, Dick Armey, and the American conservative movement.

== Content ==
The contract's text included a list of eight reforms the Republicans promised to enact, and ten bills they promised to bring to floor debate and votes, if they were made the majority following the election. During the crafting of the contract, proposals were limited to "60% issues", i.e. legislation that polling showed garnered 60% support of the American people, intending for the contract to avoid promises on controversial and divisive matters like abortion and school prayer. Reagan biographer Lou Cannon characterized the contract as having taken more than half of its text from Ronald Reagan's 1985 State of the Union Address.

=== Government and operational reforms ===
On the first day of their majority in the House, the Republicans promised to bring up for vote, eight major reforms:

1. Require all laws that apply to the rest of the country also apply to Congress;
2. Select a major, independent auditing firm to conduct a comprehensive audit of Congress for waste, fraud or abuse;
3. Cut the number of House committees, and cut committee staff by one-third;
4. Limit the terms of all committee chairs;
5. Ban the casting of proxy votes in committee;
6. Require committee meetings to be open to the public;
7. Require a three-fifths majority vote to pass a tax increase;
8. Guarantee an honest accounting of the federal budget by implementing zero base-line budgeting.

=== Major policy changes ===
During the first one hundred days of the 104th Congress, the Republicans pledged "to bring to the floor the following [ten] bills, each to be given a full and open debate, each to be given a clear and fair vote, and each to be immediately available for public inspection". The text of the proposed bills was included in the contract, which was released prior to the election. These bills were not governmental operational reforms, as the previous promises were; rather, they represented significant changes to policy. They mainly included a balanced budget requirement, tax cuts for small businesses, families and seniors, term limits for legislators, social security reform, tort reform, and welfare reform.

== Implementation ==
The contract promised to bring to floor debate and votes ten bills that would implement reform of the federal government. When the 104th Congress assembled in January 1995, the Republican majority sought to implement the contract.

In some cases (e.g. The National Security Restoration Act and The Personal Responsibility Act), the proposed bills were accomplished by a single act analogous to that which had been proposed in the contract; in other cases (e.g. The Job Creation and Wage Enhancement Act), a proposed bill's provisions were split up across multiple acts. Most of the bills died in the Senate, except as noted below.

=== Congressional Accountability Act ===
The Congressional Accountability Act of 1995 (CAA) (Pub. L. 104–1 (text) (PDF)), the first piece of legislation passed by the 104th United States Congress, applied several civil rights, labor, and workplace safety and health laws to the U.S. Congress and its associated agencies, requiring them to follow many of the same employment and workplace safety laws applied to businesses and the federal government. Previously, agencies in the legislative branch had been exempt from these laws. The act also established a dispute resolution procedure as an alternative to filing claims in federal court. The act is administered and enforced by the Office of Congressional Workplace Rights.

The Congressional Accountability Act was passed by vote of 98–1 in the Senate and 390–0 in the House. The law was the first plank in the Contract with America, the Republican Party agenda for the 1994 Congressional elections.

The act was amended by the passage of the Office of Compliance Administrative and Technical Corrections Act of 2015.(H.R. 1213, Pub. L. 114–6 (text) (PDF))

=== Fiscal Responsibility Act ===
An amendment to the Constitution that would require a balanced budget unless sanctioned by a two-thirds vote in both houses of Congress (H.J.Res.1, passed by the US House Roll Call: 300-132, January 26, 1995, but rejected by the US Senate: Roll Call 65–35 (the amendment was defeated by a single vote, with one Republican opposed, Oregon Republican senator Mark Hatfield; Bob Dole cast a procedural vote against the amendment to bring it up again in the future), March 2, 1995, two-thirds required.

=== Taking Back Our Streets Act ===
An anti-crime package including stronger truth in sentencing, "good faith" exclusionary rule exemptions (H.R.666 Exclusionary Rule Reform Act, passed US House Roll Call 289–142 February 8, 1995), death penalty provisions (H.R.729 Effective Death Penalty Act, passed US House Roll Call 297–132 February 8, 1995; similar provisions enacted under S. 735 , April 24, 1996), funding prison construction (H.R.667 Violent Criminal Incarceration Act, passed US House Roll Call 265–156 February 10, 1995, rc#117) and additional law enforcement (H.R.728 Local Government Law Enforcement Block Grants Act, passed US House Roll Call 238–192 February 14, 1995).

=== Personal Responsibility Act ===
An act to discourage illegitimacy and teen pregnancy by reforming and cutting cash welfare and related programs. This would be achieved by prohibiting welfare to mothers under 18 years of age, denying increased Aid to Families with Dependent Children (AFDC) for additional children while on welfare, and enacting a two-years-and-out provision with work requirements to promote individual responsibility. H.R.4, the Family Self-Sufficiency Act, included provisions giving food vouchers to unwed mothers under 18 in lieu of cash AFDC benefits, denying cash AFDC benefits for additional children to people on AFDC, requiring recipients to participate in work programs after two years on AFDC, complete termination of AFDC payments after five years, and suspending driver and professional licenses of people who fail to pay child support. H.R.4, passed by the US House 234–199, March 23, 1995, and passed by the US Senate 87–12, September 19, 1995. The act was vetoed by President Clinton, but the alternative Personal Responsibility and Work Opportunity Reconciliation Act which offered many of the same policies was enacted August 22, 1996.

=== American Dream Restoration Act ===
An act to create a $500-per-child tax credit, add a tax credit for couples who pay more taxes in aggregate if they are married than if they were single (but keep in place the concept of Earned Income Splitting), and creation of American Dream Savings Accounts to provide middle-class tax relief. H.R.1215, passed 246–188, April 5, 1995.

=== National Security Restoration Act ===
An act to prevent U.S. troops from serving under United Nations command unless the president determines it is necessary for the purposes of national security, to cut U.S. payments for UN peacekeeping operations, and to help establish guidelines for the voluntary integration of former Warsaw Pact nations into NATO. H.R.7, passed 241–181, February 16, 1995.

=== Common Sense Legal Reform Act ===
An act to institute "loser pays" laws (H.R.988, passed 232–193, March 7, 1995), limits on punitive damages and weakening of product liability laws to prevent what the bill considered frivolous litigation (H.R.956, passed 265–161, March 10, 1995; passed Senate 61–37, May 11, 1995, vetoed by President Clinton. "H.R.956 - Product Liability Fairness Act of 1995". Another tort reform bill, the Private Securities Litigation Reform Act, was enacted in 1995 when Congress overrode Clinton's veto.

=== Job Creation and Wage Enhancement Act ===
A package of measures to act as small-business incentives: capital-gains cuts and indexation, neutral cost recovery, risk assessment/cost-benefit analysis, strengthening the Regulatory Flexibility Act and unfunded mandate reform to create jobs and raise worker wages. Although this was listed as a single bill in the contract, its provisions ultimately made it to the House Floor as four bills:

- H.R.5, requiring federal funding for state spending mandated by congressional action and estimated by the Congressional Budget Office to cost more than $50 million per year (for the years of 1996–2002), was passed 360–74, February 1, 1995. This bill was conferenced with S. 1 and enacted, March 22, 1995 "S.1 - Unfunded Mandates Reform Act of 1995".
- H.R.450 required a moratorium on the implementation of federal regulations until June 30, 1995, and was passed 276–146, February 24, 1995. Companion Senate bill S. 219 passed by voice vote, May 17, 1995, but the two bills never emerged from conference "S.219 - Regulatory Transition Act of 1995".
- H.R.925 required federal compensation to be paid to property owners when federal government actions reduced the value of the property by 20% or more, and was passed 277–148, March 3, 1995.
- H.R.926, passed 415–14 on March 1, 1995, required federal agencies to provide a cost-benefit analysis on any regulation costing $50 million or more annually, to be signed off on by the Office of Management and Budget, and permitted small businesses to sue that agency if they believed the analysis was performed inadequately or incorrectly.

=== Citizen Legislature Act ===
An amendment to the Constitution that would have imposed 12-year term limits on members of Congress (i.e. six terms for representatives, two terms for senators). H.J.Res. 73 rejected by the House 227–204 (a constitutional amendment requires a two-thirds majority, not a simple majority), March 29, 1995; RC #277.

=== Other sections ===
Other sections of the contract include a proposed Family Reinforcement Act (tax incentives for adoption, strengthening the powers of parents in their children's education, stronger child pornography laws, and elderly dependent care tax credit) and the Senior Citizens Fairness Act (raise the Social Security earnings limit, repeal the 1993 tax hikes on Social Security benefits and provide tax incentives for private long-term care insurance).

== Non-implementation ==
A November 13, 2000, article by Edward H. Crane, president of the libertarian Cato Institute, stated, "the combined budgets of the 95 major programs that the contract with America promised to eliminate have increased by 13%."

== Effects ==
Some observers cite the Contract with America as having helped secure a decisive victory for the Republicans in the 1994 elections; others dispute this role, noting its late introduction into the campaign. Whatever the role of the contract, Republicans were elected to a majority of both houses of Congress for the first time since 1953, and some parts of the contract were enacted. Most elements did not pass Congress, while others were vetoed by, or substantially altered in negotiations with President Bill Clinton, who would sarcastically refer to it as the "Contract on America" implying that the Republicans' legislative package was akin to an organized-crime "hit" on the American public. As a blueprint for the policy of the new congressional majority, authors Micklethwait and Wooldridge argue in The Right Nation that the contract placed Congress back in the driver's seat of domestic government policy for most of the 104th Congress, and placed the Clinton White House on the defensive.

George Mason University law professor David E. Bernstein has argued that the contract "show[ed] ... that [Congress took] federalism and limited national government seriously", and "undoubtedly made [the Supreme Court decision in] United States v. Lopez more viable".

== Commentary ==
Journalist and senior congressional reporter Major Garrett equated the contract with a game of miniature golf, "fun, popular, and largely diversionary exercise meant to satisfy middle-class sensibilities", contrasted with the golf of governing America and leadership. Republicans interviewed by Garrett when the contract was being compiled said it was meant to be a political document of easy goals, not a governing document, with one senior aide explaining, "We don't care if the Senate passes any of the items in the contract. It would be preferable, but it's not necessary. If the freshmen do everything the contract says, they'll be in excellent shape for 1996".

In 2014, business and finance writer John Steele Gordon, writing in The American, an online magazine published by the American Enterprise Institute, praised the contract, calling it the main reason for the Republican victory in 1994, in part because it "nationalized the election".

== See also ==
- Republican Revolution
- List of 1994 Contract with America signers
- Contract with the Italians
- Project 2025

== Sources ==
- Text of the Contract, from the U.S. House website
- "Contract with America - 1994". Historical Documents. National Center for Public Policy Research. May 1, 2010. Archived from the original on June 17, 2012.
- The Contract with America: Implementing New Ideas in the U.S.^{[unfit]}, from The Heritage Foundation
- Beyond the Contract, criticism of the contract from Mother Jones magazine
