= John D. Martin =

John D. Martin may refer to:

- John Donelson Martin (1830–1862), American soldier
- John Donelson Martin Sr. (1883–1962), American judge and John Donelson Martin's grandson
- John D. Martin (author) (born 1945), American finance and business author and professor
- J. D. Martin (born 1983), American baseball player
- John David Martin (born 1939), American former track and field athlete

== See also ==
- John Martin (disambiguation)
