= Venetian Holy Inquisition =

Anti-heresy tribunal (1547–1797)

The Venetian Inquisition, formally the Holy Office (Latin: Sanctum Officium), was the tribunal established jointly by the Venetian government and the Catholic Church to repress heresy throughout the Republic of Venice. The inquisition also intervened in cases of sacrilege, apostasy, prohibited books, superstition, and witchcraft. It was established in the 16th-century and was abolished in 1797.

== History ==
=== Early inquisitions ===
In the Republic of Venice, the doge, as the supreme judicial authority, was ultimately responsible for repressing heresy, which was seen as a threat to the good ordering of the society. Yet heresy, even though considered among the most heinous of crimes, is not listed as an offence in the promissio maleficiorum of 1232, the document revised by Doge Jacopo Tiepolo that articulated punishable crimes. Specific magistrates super inquirendis hereticis to assist the doge in cases of heresy are first mentioned in the coronation oath, promissione ducale, of Doge Marino Morosini, dated 13 June 1249. (Note: In his history of the Venetian Inquisition, Discorso dell'origine, forma, leggi ed uso dell'Uffizio dell'Inquisizione nella città e dominio di Venezia (1638), Paolo Sarpi affirms that the nomination of magistrates in 1249 to investigate cases of heresy and the formalization of a judicial process resulted from concerns for public order when Ghibelline immigrants from the March of Treviso and Romagna, sympathetic to the Holy Roman Empire and hostile to the pope, sought refuge in Venice. The prudence of the Venetian government, Sarpi writes, was to avoid the factional strife that had convulsed cities on the Italian mainland by creating magistrates to determine if any of the opinions of the refugees amounted to heresy. See Paolo Sarpi, Discorso dell'origine, forma, leggi ed uso dell'Uffizio dell'Inquisizione nella città e dominio di Venezia ([Venetia]: [n. pub], 1638), p. 32–33 and Albanese, L'inquisizione religiosa nella repubblica di Venezia..., p. 51) These magistrates were laymen personally chosen by the doge for their religious devotion and integrity. Although they were given authority to prosecute cases of heresy, the actual interrogation of suspected individuals was carried out by the patriarch of Grado, the bishop of Olivolo, and other Venetian bishops who as ordinaries had jurisdiction in virtue of their offices. The doge, in concert with the Great Council and the Minor Council, retained judicial authority with regard to sentencing, which included burning at the stake. (Note: A decree of 1184 by Pope Lucius III, and subsequent commentary, established that in cases of heresy burning was the most appropriate punishment; the execution, however, was to be deferred to secular authority. Similarly, in 1216 the Fourth Lateran Council recommended public burnings but prohibited the clergy from carrying out any sentence of death. See Calimani, L'inquisizione a Venezia..., pp. 6–7)

On 12 August 1289, under pressure exerted by Pope Nicholas IV, the Great Council voted to admit the papal inquisition into Venice's territories. The council's decree, with the relative clauses, was inserted into the papal bull of 28 August 1289 that formally established the Holy Office in Venice. The Venetian government, however, reserved for itself a degree of control to ensure its sovereignty and its jurisdiction in all matters pertaining to the state. Specifically, the doge retained the right to intervene in the proceedings of the inquisition, and the inquisitor, appointed directly by the pope, was to swear an oath of fidelity to the republic in the hands of doge, with the formal promise that he conceal nothing from the government. The state also exercised control financially by means of a fund, managed by the government, which received the assets confiscated from heretics and in turn covered the expenses of the Holy Office.

Inquisitorial activity was only sporadic in Venice after 1423 when the government suspended the stipend of the inquisitor, but it intensified beginning in the 1530s, largely in response to the Protestant Reformation. The renewal of inquisitorial activity was also consistent with broader efforts to moralize the society and gain the favour of God following the Venetian defeat at the Battle of Agnadello in 1509, a defeat that was interpreted as divine punishment for the moral dissolution of the Venetians.

=== Roman Inquisition ===
Jacopo Pontormo, Portrait of Giovanni della Casa (c. 1541–1544). As papal nuncio to Venice (1544–1550), della Casa pressed the Venetian government on behalf of Pope Paul III for the establishment of the Roman Inquisition.

In 1542, Pope Paul III established the Roman Inquisition as part of the Catholic Church's efforts to repress Protestantism in the period of the Counter Reformation. Unlike earlier inquisitions which tasked secular authorities with the punishment of heretics, the new institution depended directly upon the Holy See and had full authority throughout the Italian peninsula to identify and interrogate heretics and emit sentences, including the death penalty. The objective was to eliminate religious dissent and ensure uniformity of doctrine. To secular rulers, the pope warned of the risks that came with heresy: social disorder, subversion of authority, and even the wrath of God for those governments that tolerated sin.

The creation of the Roman Inquisition was strongly advocated by Cardinal Gian Pietro Carafa, later Pope Paul IV, largely on the basis of his personal experiences in Venice. He had taken refuge in the city in 1527, following the Sack of Rome, and remained until 1536. In a missive to Pope Clement VII in 1532, Caraffa lamented the diffusion of heresy in Venice and its territories, noting specifically the presence of itinerant apostates, particularly conventual Franciscans. The inquisition, he proposed, was the best remedy to restore the honour of the Holy See and to punish those heretics who misled the faithful.

On its part, the Venetian government was resistant to the establishment of an inquisitorial tribunal with direct allegiance to Rome. Although it shared the Church's objective of maintaining an orderly society with a hierarchical structure and shared values, its trading interests required a degree of tolerance that made it possible for merchants of faiths other than Catholicism to conduct affairs in the city, unhindered. The government further sought to defend its autonomy in the administration of justice. Resistance also stemmed from the longstanding Venetian conception of the state as a sacred entity empowered by God and the resulting assertion of the government to administer local ecclesiastical matters.

The task of reaching a compromise between the Church and the republic fell to Giovanni della Casa, archbishop of Benevento, who was nominated papal nuncio to Venice in 1544. He was to institute the new tribunal and organize the first trials of the Protestant reformers. Della Casa judiciously chose his cases and concentrated on prosecuting those heretics that were a greater threat to social order and the security of the state in an effort to win over the Venetian government. A shift in the international balance of power also favoured his cause. The deaths in quick succession of King Henry VIII of England and King Francis I of France strengthened the position of the Church's principal ally, the Holy Roman Emperor Charles V who went on the offensive against the Schmalkaldic League of Protestant princes. In this new reality, Venice's previous efforts to counter the influence of the Holy Roman Empire by cultivating relations with England, France, and the league were no longer practicable. Prudence dictated greater support for the empire and the Church.

Negotiations between della Casa and the Venetian government for the establishment of the Roman Inquisition in Venice continued. To the Venetian proposal that jurisdiction reside with the Venetian bishops as ordinaries, Paul III countered that the ordinaries were not sufficient and that time was of the essence. It was also suggested that the Church could try cases for heresy alone, but that all other related offences would be deferred to the state. The solution to the impasse was the creation by the Minor Council of the three savi all'eresia (sages over heresy) on 22 April 1547. These Venetian officials, described as "honest, discreet, and Catholic men" ("probi, discreti e cattolici uomini"), were to assist and control the ecclesiastic tribunal with the objective of defending the sovereignty of the republic and its jurisdiction over its subjects. They were to block any proceedings of the Holy Office that might have violated Venetian laws and customs or had ramifications for the economic, social, and diplomatic interests of the state. Without their participation, the proceedings of the inquisition would be invalid, ipso iure. Although the Holy Office in Rome had sought greater clerical control, della Casa reassured his superiors that the three nobles chosen as the first savi all'eresia were intent on repressing heresy. Doge Francesco Donà himself had declared that there was "nothing more fitting a Christian prince than zeal in religion and the defence of the Catholic faith".

== Composition ==
The Venetian Holy Office consisted of six members, three clerical and three lay, plus staff.

=== Clerics ===
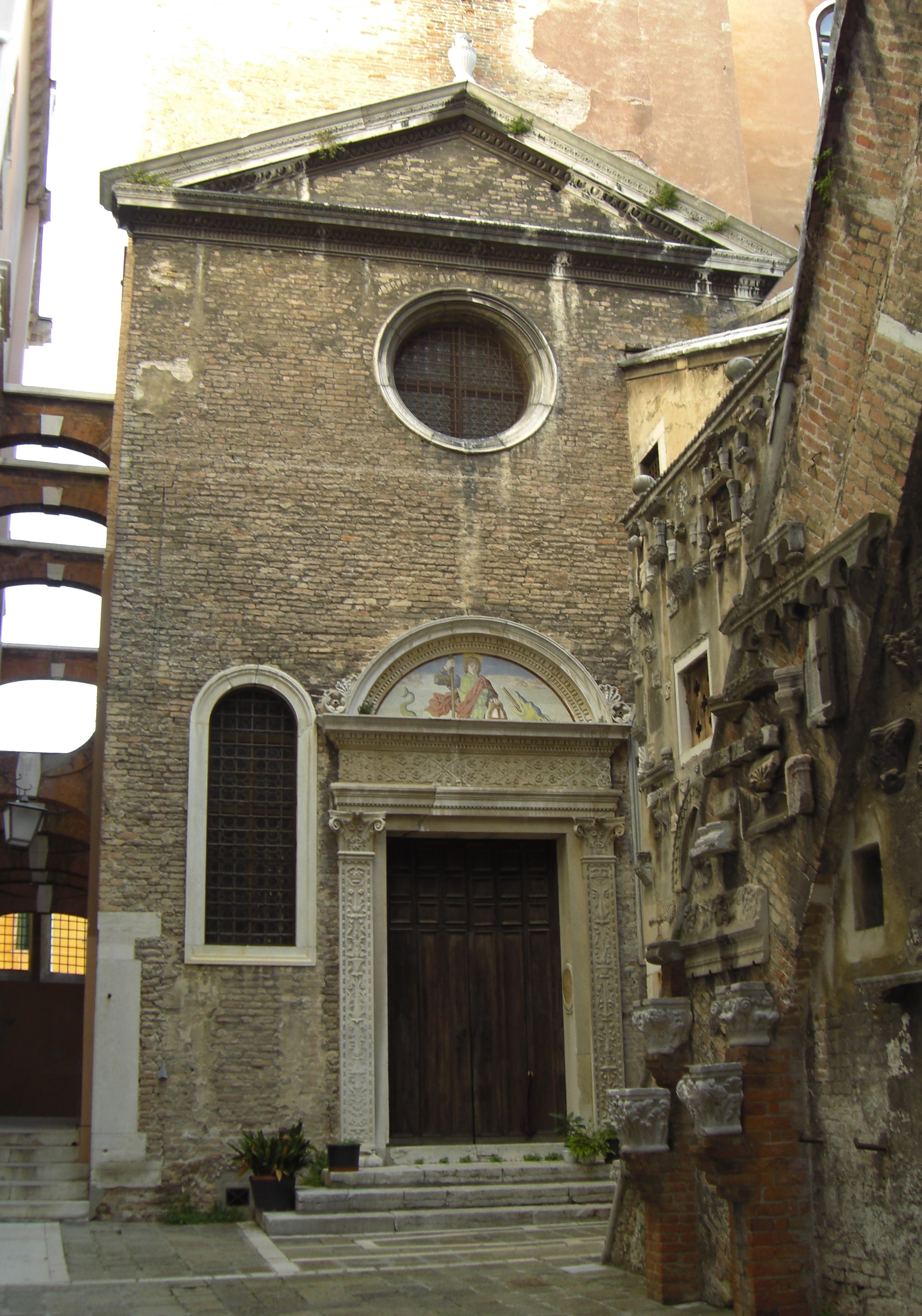
The Church of Saint Theodore, seat of the Venetian Holy Office

The inquisitor, as judge-delegate of the pope, was responsible for conducting the trial and for ascertaining heresy. He was ideally a theologian of at least 40 years of age, and it was desirable that he also be qualified in canon law. In proceedings, he was assisted by the commissario who acted as his deputy. Although the inquisitor was nominated by the pope, a formal grant of the Full College, the executive committee of the Senate, was required before a newly appointed inquisitor could begin service. Furthermore, he largely served at the pleasure of the Venetian government which could call for his substitution: in 1560 the government demanded the removal of Filippo Peretti, later Pope Sixtus V, for his intransigence. From that date, the inquisitor, since 1289 a Franciscan, was nominated from the Dominican order.

The Venetian Holy Office also included the papal nuncio. As the diplomatic representative of the papacy, he could intervene directly with the Venetian government to defend the interests of the Church and the inquisition, particularly in disputed cases. His participation ensured that the inquisition in Venice remained subject to the Holy Office in Rome and acted with the full authority of the pope. He enjoyed the judicial power of a legate in ecclesiastical matters and was responsible for all of the inquisitorial tribunals within Venice's subject territories. Often the papal nuncio was substituted by the auditor-general who was a staff member and provided essential continuity from one nuncio to the next.

As ordinary, the patriarch of Venice (formerly the patriarch of Grado), or his vicar-general, had jurisdiction in cases of heresy by virtue of his office. Accordingly, he was a member of the Holy Inquisition in representation of the interests of the local church.

=== Savi all'eresia ===
Representing the interests of the state and defending the rights and privileges of Venice were the three savi all'eresia. All laymen, they were initially chosen by the Minor Council, consisting of the doge and six councillors. But legislation of 5 June 1554 reserved the election to the councillors alone, the doge retaining the right of proposal. A reform dated 7 June 1556 empowered the Full College with the election which, after 8 April 1595, became the purview of the entire Senate. The term was set at two years with the possibility of renewal. Henceforth, the savi all'eresia were a magistratura senatoriale (senatorial magistracy), a standing subcommittee of the Senate. They were chosen from among the senators, routinely individuals who had been members of the Council of Ten, responsible for state security, or former ambassadors of the republic to Rome. Excluded were the so-called papalisti, members of those patrician families who maintained close ties with the papal court and often enjoyed ecclesiastical preferments in the form of offices and benefices. The presence of at least one of the savi all'eresia was necessary for the inquisition to convene. They authorized arrest warrants, and although the sentence was handed down only by the three clerical members, the authorization of the savi all'eresia was necessary to carry it out.

== Proceedings ==
The Venetian Holy Office convened regularly on Tuesdays, Thursdays, and Saturdays in the Church of Saint Theodore, attached to the Church of Saint Mark, the ducal chapel. Roughly one third of the proceedings concerned matters directly related to Venice. The tribunal additionally functioned as a district court for the entire Venetian Republic, including the inquisitorial courts in Padua, Treviso, Verona, Rovigo, Vicenza, Udine, and Brescia as well as in the overseas territories. (Note: The local inquisitions typically consisted of the diocesan bishop, a commissario, normally a Franciscan or Dominican friar, who served as inquisitor, and the podestà as the administrator for the Venetian government. See Pullan, The Jews of Europe and the Inquisition of Venice..., pp. 6–7 and 27) While it did not regularly act as a court of appeal, it could call cases before it for further investigation and retry any case within its jurisdiction. The Venetian Holy Office also maintained routine correspondence with the Holy Office in Rome, from which it received directives. It submitted all sentences to Rome for approval and could transmit the transcripts of an entire case if there were particular difficulties.

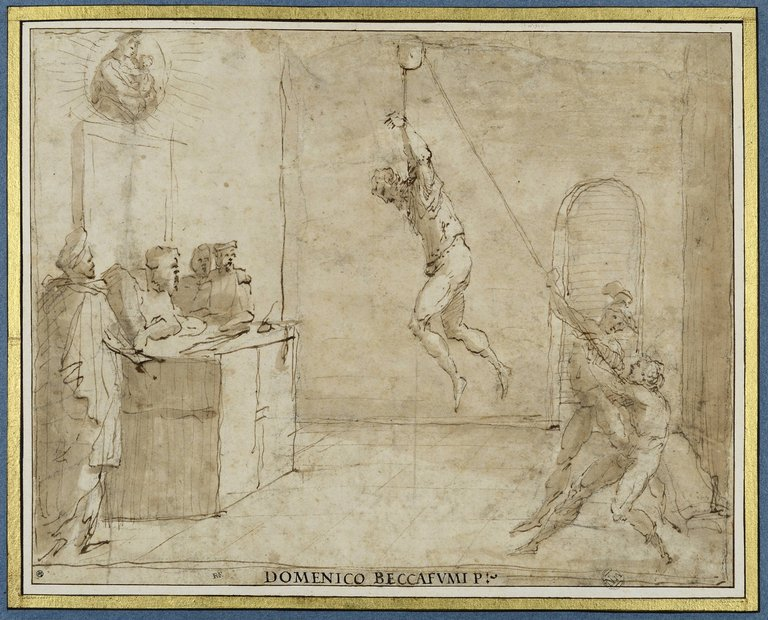
Domenico Beccafumi, "Il supplizio dello strappado".

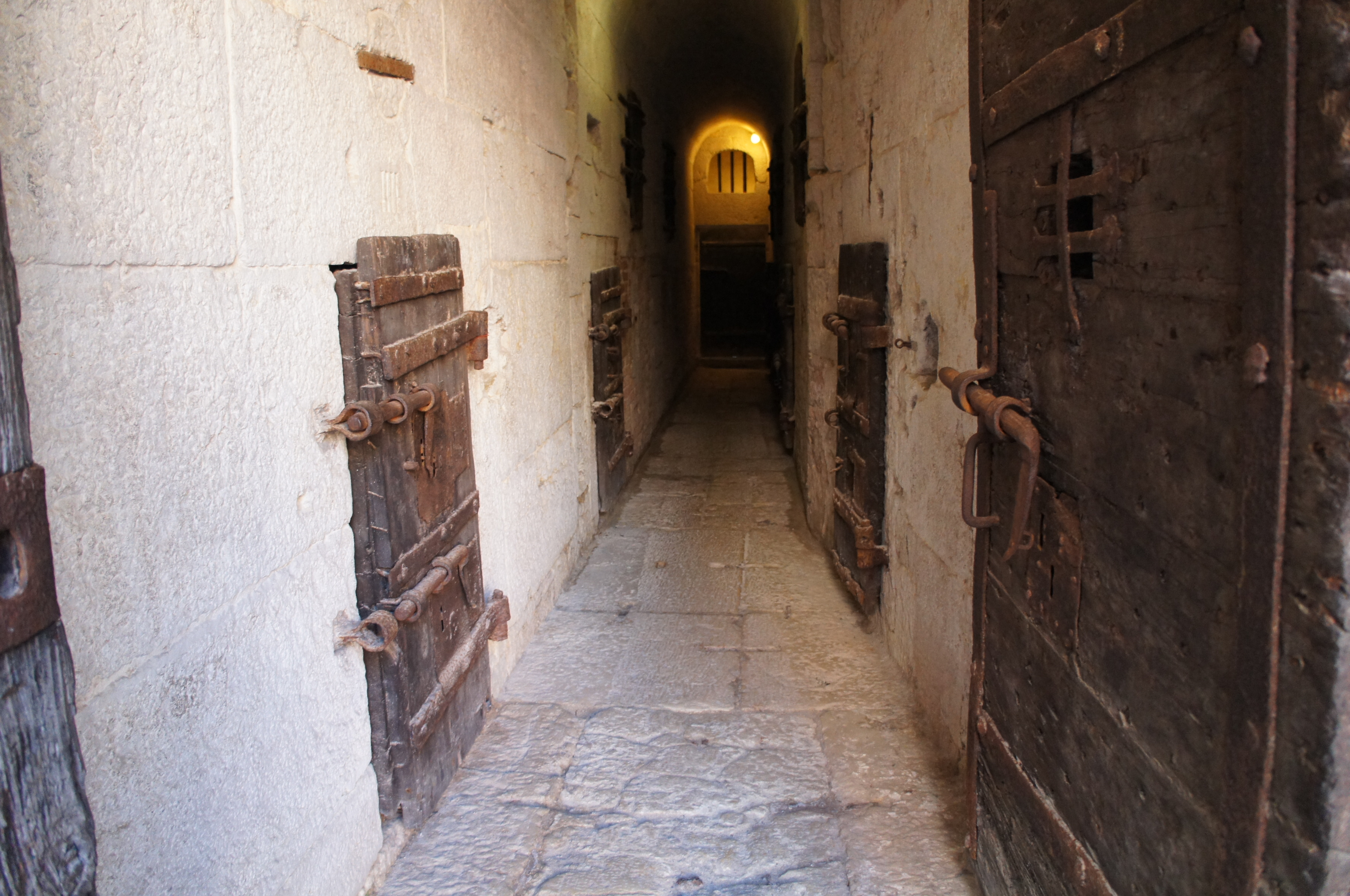
The Venetian Holy Office operated its own cells inside the New Prisons, near Saint Mark's Square.

Although the inquisition could act on its own initiative whenever there was a suspicion of heresy or a Venetian secular magistracy could notify the religious tribunal of evidence discovered in criminal proceedings, most often an investigation began when a formal denunciation, signed or anonymous, was received. Some of the denunciations concerned individuals who had spoken out against the devotion to saints, the necessity of confession with a priest, the belief in the real presence of Christ in the Blessed Sacrament, or the value of good works in salvation. Others signalled only suspect behavior: the refusal to show devotion to sacred images, the failure to fast and observe abstinence from meat, or the refusal to take communion. Through proclamations in the public squares and sermons in the churches, the populace was encouraged to denounce individuals suspected of heresy. Particularly in the secrecy of the confession, penitents were exhorted to collaborate and identify individuals whose asserted beliefs or religious practices were at odds with Catholic teachings. Parish priests and schoolmasters were also admonished to report any suspicion of heresy.

Time and resources were limited, and the inquisition did not act on all of the denunciations it received: the majority of denunciations was in fact not pursued. The principal criterion for beginning an investigation was the perceived harm to the common welfare. Generally, the inquisition was hesitant to proceed on the basis of an anonymous denunciation, unless of grave interest in which case individuals who could corroborate the charge were subpoenaed. Even a signed denunciation was less likely to be acted upon if the accuser had a close acquaintance with the accused, whether personal or financial, for concerns that the accusation could be motivated by vindictiveness.

For a signed denunciation, the accuser made a formal deposition. Witnesses were then called for questioning. The parish priest could also be summoned to give testimony regarding the suspect's religious life and conduct. If the charge was found to have merit, normally having been confirmed by several witnesses, an arrest warrant for the accused individual was issued in the name of the inquisition, but only with the approval of the savi all'eresia. Proceedings could also continue in absentia. For more serious charges, additional guidance from the Holy Office in Rome was often sought, considerably lengthening the detention period. In the event that the Holy Office in Rome sought the extradition of a suspected heretic for further interrogation and punishment, the authorization of the Council of Ten was necessary. While this was readily granted for foreigners on Venetian territory, the council was more resistant to any attempt to extradite Venetian subjects, particularly members of the elite classes.

On the basis of the depositions, the procurator-fiscal, a member of the inquisition staff, formulated the charges and argued the case before the court. As a crime of thought, heresy was difficult to ascertain. At times, there was evidence in the form of forbidden books, letters, or documents. But the inquisition primarily investigated opinions and ideas, and the inquisitor's role was to probe the intellect and will of the accused individual and discover his motives and intentions. Obtaining a full confession was the principal objective. Torture, primarily strappado but also applying fire to the feet, was rarely used by the Venetian Holy Office, only in roughly three percent of the cases for which documentation survives. In accordance with directives contained in the inquisitor's manual Directorium Inquisitorum, it was limited to situations in which the accused had contradicted himself and strong indications of guilt had already been discovered. More important to obtaining a confession was prolonged imprisonment. (Note: The Venetian Holy Office initially made use of the debtors' prison for the sestiere (district) of Castello, near San Giovanni in Bragora. Cells under the direct control of the inquisition were constructed near Saint Mark's Square in the 1580s and subsequently incorporated into the New Prisons. See Pullan, The Jews of Europe and the Inquisition of Venice..., pp. 135–136)

Although the accused individual was not given the benefit of a formal defence during the interrogation, he was allowed to review and respond to witness statements, which were provided to the accused devoid of any names that could have exposed the witnesses to retaliation. Witnesses who were found to have falsely testified were punished.

A formal trial began once sufficient evidence had been garnered. The defendant could choose his own advocate, or a defense advocate, a doctor in canon law, was provided to advise the accused and formulate a defense which could be conducted on legal, theological, historical, or even medical grounds, most often with a plea of insanity. Some defendants simply threw themselves upon the mercy of the court.

Capital punishment was rare: only eighteen cases out of the 1560 trials documented in the sixteenth century. Despite the calls on the part of the clerical members of the inquisition for exemplary and public executions in Saint Mark's Square in order to educate the people and strengthen their bond with the Church, the Venetian government only consented to secret executions, carried out by drowning. The condemned was rowed to the open Adriatic at dawn, and in the presence of a priest who recited prayers for the individual's soul, he was dropped into the sea, weighted by a stone. The secrecy of executions was intended to preserve Venice's international reputation as a tolerant city, open to Protestant merchants. (Note: John Martin suggests that the secret executions were also meant to induce fear in the population: "From the vantage point of the Venetian public, a man summoned to the Inquisition, especially for a second time, might seemingly vanish into thin air. There was no public accounting. And if the individual was executed, the victim's friends and relatives must have relied on horrible rumors, with their potent capacity to intimidate still others." See Martin, Venice's Hidden Enemies..., p. 69)

== Jurisdiction ==
=== Marranism and Judaization ===
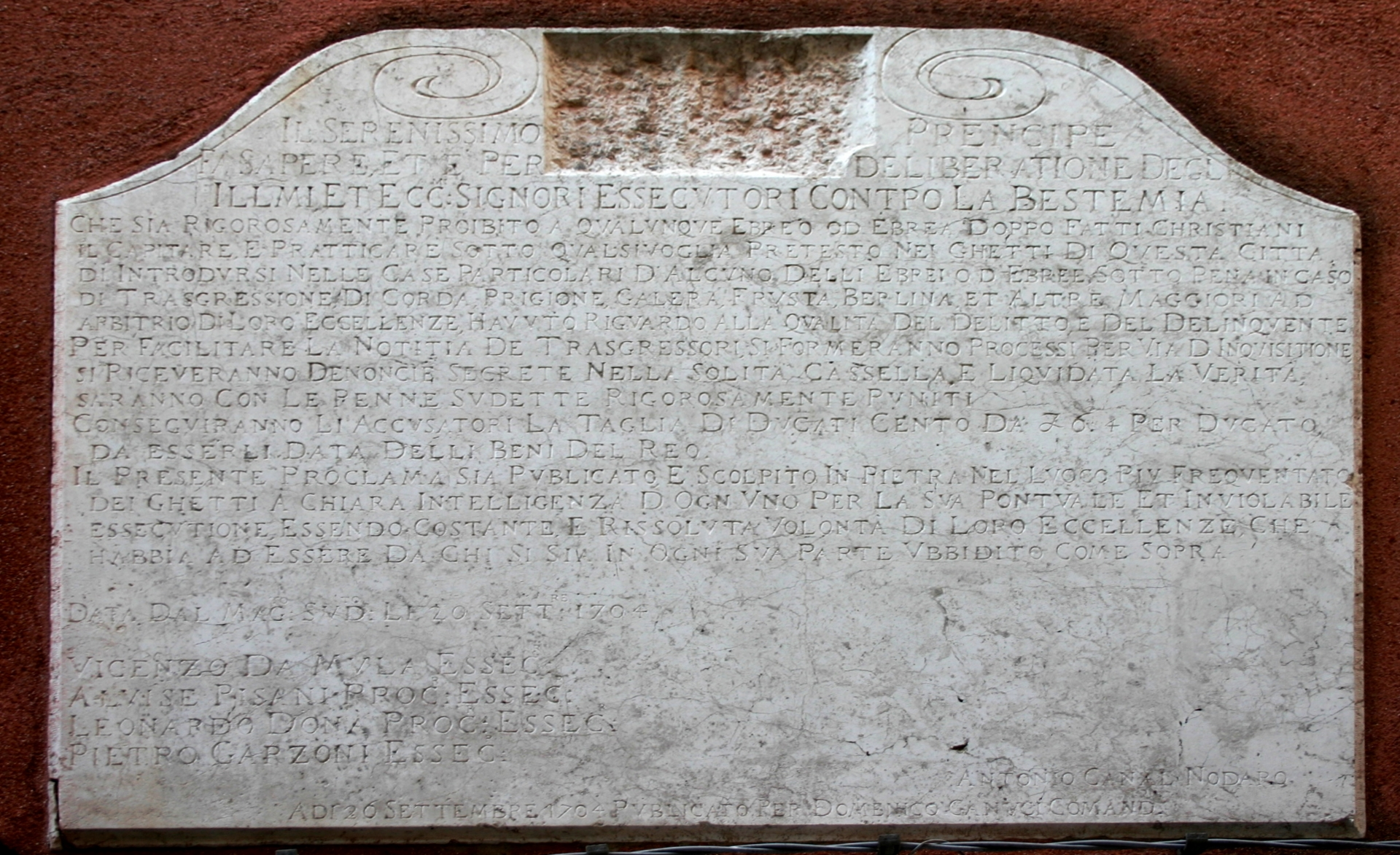
By decision of the Esecutori contro la bestemmia, Jews who had converted to Christianity were forbidden to enter the Ghetto upon pain of strappado, imprisonment, galley service, whipping, exposure in a pillory, or worse on the basis of the nature of the crime and of the offender.

Venice economically relied upon the Jewish community. The Germanic-Italian Jews, largely Italian-born but of German descent, operated the banks in the Ghetto that provided low-interest loans to the poor, whereas the Sephardi Jews, whether transient or resident, maintained important commercial contacts throughout the Mediterranean, particularly within the Ottoman Empire. With large amounts of liquid capital, the Jews also contributed financially through taxes and forced loans to the government. As a result, only five percent of the cases processed by the Venetian Holy Office in the sixteenth and seventeenth centuries involve the Jewish community, mostly Marrano Jews and Judaizers, Christians who had adopted Jewish customs.

From a Christian perspective, the Jews who had been forcibly converted to Christianity in the Iberian Peninsula but later reverted to Judaism were apostates and heretics. But despite the occasional removal from the Ghetto of Jewish children who had been baptized, there was little interest on the part of the Venetian Holy Office for the Jewish adults that had been baptized prior to arrival in Venice and chose to live in the Ghetto as Jews. Although occasion denunciations were received, any inquisitorial process would have depended upon the ability to verify events that had occurred in Spain and Portugal. Additionally, in 1589 the Senate voted to grant safe-conduct to the 'Ponentine' Jews (from Spain, Portugal, and the Habsburg Netherlands), allowing them to legally settle in the Ghetto and conduct their international trade with no investigation into their religious past. Of concern were the crypto-Jews who lived ostensibly in the community as Christians while practicing their Jewish faith in secret. Denunciations received by the Venetian Holy Office were similar to those signalling a bad Christian, notably the failure to show reverence to Christian holy images, to pray the Ave Maria in public, and to attend mass and take communion. But they included more specific charges such as the wearing of Jewish dress, the observing of Jewish dietary laws, and the refraining from work on Shabbat.

=== Witchcraft ===
Sorcery, witchcraft, and superstition accounted for approximately one-eighth of the cases in the sixteenth century. In the seventeenth century, fifty percent of the cases concerned witchcraft.

=== Censorship ===
In the sixteenth century, Venice was Italy's largest centre for printing, with a production of 8,150 titles between 1550 and 1599. Any censorship therefore had potential repercussions for an important sector of the economy. Nevertheless, roughly ten percent of the cases before the Venetian Holy Office in the sixteenth century concerned the production, distribution, or possession of prohibited books, whereas censorship in the seventeenth century accounted for only four percent of the cases.

Within Venice's territories, the riformatori dello studio di Padova, the educational committee of the Senate established in 1517, were administratively responsible for censorship, under the authority of the Council of Ten. As representatives of the state, they were principally concerned with controlling political writings as well as those moral texts that could erode public mores and, as a result, threaten proper relationships within the society. Little attention was given to religious writings in the early decades of the Protestant Reformation, despite growing pressures from the papacy to eliminate books critical of Catholic doctrine. Limited control began in 1527 when the Senate decreed that the protection of rights, either for the printer or the author, would be henceforth contingent upon the issuance of an imprimatur, the license needed to legally print any book. Fines, issued by the esecutori contro la bestemmia (executors against blasphemy), were authorized in 1543 expressly for any printer or bookseller who trafficked in books contrary to the Catholic faith. However, no similar fines existed for imported books with heretical doctrines; hence Protestant books, brought to the city by German merchants, circulated freely. A marked increase in censorship aimed at eliminating controversial religious writings inevitably followed the institution of the Roman inquisition and the creation of the savi all'eresia in 1547. Already in July 1548, some 1,400 books were publicly burned, mostly in Saint Mark's Square.

Efforts to limit the production and circulation of heretical books were initially hindered by the lack of any accepted criteria to identify objectionable texts. Prior to Pope Paul IV's promulgation in 1559 of the Index Librorum Prohibitorum (List of Prohibited Books), no compiled list of forbidden books existed in Venice: the Venetian inquisition emanated decrees against single works. An early attempt by the Council of Ten to draw up a list of banned titles in 1549 was unsuccessful, the Venetian printers arguing that at that time not even in Rome was there a similar index. With the papal index, censorship became more effective. In 1569, following the Venetian acceptance of the decrees of the Council of Trent and the new Tridentine Index (1564), the government made the procedures to obtain the license for publication more stringent. Control over imported books was tightened with the authorized presence of a representative of the inquisition at the customs house. Furthermore, the inquisition was allowed to send inspectors to bookshops and printing houses to confiscate unauthorized books.

In general, cases involving prohibited books were quickly resolved; the evidence was tangible, and printers and booksellers preferred to confess to the crime of illegal trafficking in forbidden texts and pay a fine rather than undergo an investigation into their private beliefs and associations and risk a charge of heresy.

== Bibliography ==
- Albanese, Francesco, L'inquisizione religiosa nella repubblica di Venezia: ricerche storiche e raffronti (Venezia: Naratovich, 1875)
- Amelot de La Houssaie, Abraham-Nicolas, The history of the government of Venice: wherein the policies, councils, magistrates, and laws of that state are fully related, and the use of the balloting box exactly described: written in the year 1675 (London: John Starkey, 1677)
- Calimani, Riccardo, L'inquisizione a Venezia: eretici e processi 1548–1674 (Milano: Mondadori, 2002) ISBN 8804511443
- Da Mosto, Andrea, L'Archivio di Stato di Venezia, indice generale, storico, descrittivo ed analitico (Roma: Biblioteca d'Arte editrice, 1937)
- Del Col, Andrea, 'L'inquisizione romana e il potere politico nella repubblica di Venezia (1540-1560)', Critica storica, XXVIII, 2 (1991), 189–250
- Del Col, Andrea, 'Organizzazione, composizione e giurisdizione dei tribunali dell'Inquisizione romana nella repubblica di Venezia (1500-1550)', Critica storica, XXV (1988), 244-294
- Grendler, Paul, 'The Roman Inquisition and the Venetian Press, 1540–1605', The Journal of Modern History, Vol. 47, No. 1 (March 1975), 48-65 ISSN 0022-2801
- Martin, John, Venice's Hidden Enemies: Italian Heretics in a Renaissance City (Berkeley: University of California Press, 1993) ISBN 0520077431
- Martin, Ruth, Withcraft and the Inquisition in Venice 1550–1650 (Oxford: Basil Blackwell, 1989) ISBN 063116118X
- Milan, Catia, Antonio Politi, and Bruno Vianello, Guida alle magistrature: elementi per la conoscenza della Repubblica veneta (Sommacampagna: Cierre, 2003) ISBN 8883142047
- Pittalis, Gian Nicola, L'inquisizione a Venezia (Castelfranco Veneto: Biblioteca dei Leoni, 2017) ISBN 9788885460096
- Pullan, Brian, The Jews of Europe and the Inquisition of Venice 1550–1670 (Oxford: Basil Blackwell, 1983) ISBN 0631129790
- Santarelli, Daniele, 'Eresia, Riforma e Inquisizione nella Repubblica di Venezia nel Cinquecento', Studi Storici Luigi Simeoni (2007), 73–105
- Tiepolo, Maria Francesca, 'Venezia', in La Guida generale degli Archivi di Stato, IV (Roma: Ministero per i beni culturali e ambientali, Ufficio centrale per i beni archivistici, 1994), pp. 857–1014, 1062–1070, 1076–1140 ISBN 9788871250809
