= John B. Martin =

John B. Martin may refer to:

- John Bartlow Martin (1915–1987), US ambassador and author
- John Biddulph Martin, president of the Royal Statistical Society, 1896–1897
- John Blennerhassett Martin, artist who painted James Armistead

== See also ==
- John Martin (disambiguation)
