= John Martinis =

John Martinis may refer to:

- John Martinis (politician) (1930–2013), American politician
- John M. Martinis (born 1958), American physicist who won 2025 Nobel Prize in Physics

== See also ==
- John Martin (disambiguation)
