= John Martin (footballer, born 1985) =

Scottish footballer

Personal information
- Date of birth: 4 May 1985 (age 41)
- Place of birth: Kirkcaldy, Scotland
- Position: Forward

Team information
- Current team: Glenrothes

Senior career*
Years	Team	Apps	(Gls)
2003–2005	Raith Rovers	37	(4)
2005–2008	East Fife	46	(4)
2007	→ Kelty Hearts (loan)		
2008–2010	Kelty Hearts		
2010–2012	Glenrothes		
2012–2013	Ballingry Rovers		
2013–2017	Glenrothes		
2017–2018	Dundonald Bluebell		
2018	Burntisland Shipyard		
2018–2025	Glenrothes		
Total		83	(8)

Managerial career
- 2016–2017: Glenrothes
- 2019–2025: Glenrothes
- * Club domestic league appearances and goals as of 13:19, 21 February 2018 (UTC)

John Martin (born 4 May 1985), is a professional footballer who plays for Glenrothes in the SJFA East Superleague. He has previously played in the Scottish Football League First Division for Raith Rovers.

== Career ==
Martin began his professional career with Raith Rovers before moving on to East Fife in 2005.

During a period on loan at Kelty Hearts, Martin played in the 2006–07 Scottish Junior Cup final, losing 2–1 after extra time to Linlithgow Rose. He joined Kelty permanently in 2008 before signing for Glenrothes in 2010. Martin had a season at Ballingry Rovers in 2012–13 but returned to Glenrothes and stepped up to the managers role in September 2016, after the resignation of Benny Andrew.

Martin resigned from his management position at Glenrothes in March 2017 and joined Dundonald Bluebell as a player later the same month. He moved on to Burntisland Shipyard in early 2018, before returning to Glenrothes in August that year. In November 2019 Martin became Co-Manager of Glenrothes, along with Kevin Smith, after the team moved to senior football.
