= List of 1994 Contract with America signers =

The Contract with America was signed by the following list of 367 Republican candidates for U.S. Congress on the steps of the U.S. Capitol on September 27, 1994. All candidates had won the Republican nomination in their respective districts and were candidates in the 1994 U.S. Congressional general elections.

== List of 1994 Contract with America Signers ==
Three days after the signing of the Contract with America, Democratic Congresswoman from Georgia, Cynthia McKinney stated in the Congressional Record that the list of signers had not been made public.

The list of Contract With America signers was released to the public by the organizers of the Contract with America including Newt Gingrich, Dick Armey, Ed Gillespie and Bob Schellhas, the Republican National Committee, and the National Republican Congressional Committee. It was published between October and December 1994 with three different publishers (Three Rivers Press, Time Books, and Random House) in paperback editions all using the same title, Contract With America; The Bold Plan by Rep. Newt Gingrich, Rep. Dick Armey and the House Republicans to Change the Nation and same ISBN 0812925866.

=== Alabama ===
Sonny Callahan (AL 1)	Terry Everett (AL 2)	Wayne Parker Jr. (AL 5)	Spencer Bachus (AL 6)	Alfred Middleton Sr. (AL 7)

=== Arizona ===
Matt Salmon (AZ 1)	Robert MacDonald (AZ 2)	Bob Stump (AZ 3)	John Shadegg (AZ 4)	Jim Kolbe (AZ 5)
J. D. Hayworth (AZ 6)

=== Arkansas ===
Warren Dupwe (AR 1)	Bill Powell (AR 2)	Tim Hutchinson (AR 3)	Jay Dickey (AR 4)

=== California ===
Frank Riggs (CA 1)	Wally Herger (CA 2)	Tim LaFever (CA 3)	John Doolittle (CA 4)	Robert Dinsmore (CA 5)
Mike Nugent (CA 6)	Charles Hughes (CA 7)	Elsa Cheung (CA 8)	Bill Baker(CA 10)	Richard Pombo (CA 11)
Deborah Wilder (CA 12)	Ben Brink (CA 14)	Lyle Smith (CA 16)	George Radanovich (CA 19)	Bill Thomas (CA 21)
Andrea Seastrand (CA 22)	Elton Gallegly (CA 23)	Richard Sybert (CA 24)	Howard McKeon (CA 25)	Carlos Moorhead (CA 27)
David Dreier (CA 28)	Paul Stepanek (Boardman) (CA 29)	John Flores (CA 31)	Ernie Farhat (CA 32)	Albert Nunez (CA 34)
Susan Brooks (CA 36 (Candidate))	Steve Horn (CA 38)	Ed Royce (CA 39)	Jerry Lewis (CA 40)	Jay Kim (CA 41)
Robert Guzman (CA 42)	Ken Calvert (CA 43)	Sonny Bono (CA 44)	Dana Rohrabacher (CA 45)	Robert Dornan (CA 46)
Christopher Cox (CA 47)	Ron Packard (CA 48)	Brian Bilbray (CA 49)	Mary Alice Acevedo (CA 50)	Randy Cunningham (CA 51)
Duncan Hunter (CA 52)

=== Colorado ===
Pat Miller (CO 2)	Scott McInnis (CO 3)	Wayne Allard (CO 4)	Joel Hefley (CO 5)	Dan Schaefer (CO 6)

=== Connecticut ===
Douglas Putnam (CT 1)	Ed Munster (CT 2)	Christopher Shays (CT 4)	Gary Franks (CT 5)	Nancy Johnson (CT 6)

=== Delaware ===
Michael Castle (DE at Large)

=== Florida ===
Joe Scarborough (FL 1)	Carole Griffin (FL 2)	Marc Little (FL 3)	Tillie Fowler (FL 4)	Don Garlits (FL 5 candidate)
Cliff Stearns (FL 6)	John Mica (FL 7)	Bill McCollum (FL 8)	Michael Bilirakis (FL 9)	Bill Young (FL 10)
Mark Sharpe (FL 11)	Charles Canady (FL 12)	Dan Miller (FL 13)	Porter Goss (FL 14)	Dave Weldon (FL 15)
Mark Foley (FL 16)	Peter Tsakanikas (FL 19)	Beverly Kennedy (FL 20)	Clay Shaw (FL 22)

=== Georgia ===
Jack Kingston (GA 1)	Mae Collins (GA 3)	John Linder (GA 4)	Dale Dixon (GA 5)	Newt Gingrich (GA 6)
Bob Barr (GA 7)	Saxby Chambliss (GA 8)	Charles Norwood (GA 10)	Woodrow Lovett (GA 11)

=== Hawaii ===
Orson Swindle (HI 1)

=== Idaho ===
Helen Chenoweth (ID 1)	Mike Crapo (ID 2)

=== Illinois ===
Jim Nalepa (IL 3)	Steven Valtierra (IL 4)	Mike Flanagan (IL 5)	Henry Hyde (IL 6)	Philip Crane (IL 8)
George Larney (IL 9)	John Porter (IL 10)	Jerry Weller (IL 11)	Harris Fawell (IL 13)	Dennis Hastert (IL 14)
Tom Ewing (IL 15)	Don Manzullo (IL 16)	Jim Anderson (IL 17)	Brent Winters (IL 19)	Bill Owens (IL 20)

=== Indiana ===
John Larson (IN 1)	David McIntosh (IN 2)	Richard Burkett (IN 3)	Mark Souder (IN 4)	Steve Buyer (IN 5)
Dan Burton (IN 6)	John Myers (IN 7)	John Hostettler (IN 8)	Jean Leising (IN 9)	Marvin Scott (IN 10)

=== Iowa ===
Jim Leach (IA 1)	Jim Nussle (IA 2)	Jim Lightfoot (IA 3)	Greg Ganske (IA 4)	Tom Latham (IA 5)

=== Kansas ===
Pat Roberts (KS 1)	Jim Ryun (KS 2)	Jan Meyers (KS 3)	Todd Tiahrt (KS 4)

=== Kentucky ===
Edward Whitfield (KY 1)	Ron Lewis (KY 2)	Susan Stokes (KY 3)	Jim Bunning (KY 4)	Hal Rogers (KY 5)
Matthew Wills (KY 6)

=== Louisiana ===
Bob Livingston (LA 1)	Jim McCrery (LA 5)	Richard Baker (LA 6)

=== Maine ===
Jim Longley, Jr. (ME 1)	Rick Bennett (ME 2)

=== Maryland ===
Wayne Gilchrest (MD 1)	Bob Ehrlich (MD 2)	Robert Ryan Tousey (MD 3)	Michele Dyson (MD 4)	Don Devine (MD 5)
Roscoe Bartlett (MD 6)	Kenneth Kondner (MD 7)	Connie Morella (MD 8)

=== Massachusetts ===
Peter Blute (MA 3)	Dave Coleman (MA 5)	Peter Torkildsen (MA 6)	Brad Bailey (MA 7)	Michael Murphy (MA 9)
Keith Hemeon (MA 10)

=== Michigan ===
Gil Ziegler (MI 1)	Peter Hoekstra (MI 2)	Vern Ehlers (MI 3)	Dave Camp (MI 4)	William Anderson (MI 5)
Fred Upton (MI 6)	Nick Smith (MI 7)	Dick Chrysler (MI 8)	Megan O’Neill (MI 9)	Donald Lobsinger (MI 10)
Joe Knollenberg (MI 11)	John Schall (MI 13)	Ken Larkin (MI 16)

=== Minnesota ===
Gil Gutknecht (MN 1)	Gary Revier (MN 2)	James Ramstad (MN 3)	Dennis Newinski (MN 4)	Tad Jude (MN 6)
Bernie Omann (MN 7)

=== Mississippi ===
Roger Wicker (MS 1)	Bill Jordan (MS 2)	Dutch Dabbs (MS 3)	Mike Wood (MS 4)	George Barlos (MS 5)

=== Missouri ===
Donald Counts (MO 1)	Jim Talent (MO 2)	Gary Gill (MO 3)	James Noland Jr. (MO 4)	Ron Freeman (MO 5)
Tina Tucker (MO 6	Mel Hancock (MO 7)	Bill Emerson (MO 8)	Kenny Hulshof (MO 9)

=== Nebraska ===
Doug Bereuter (NE 1)	Jon Christensen (NE 2)	Bill Barrett (NE 3)

=== Nevada ===
John Ensign (NV 1)	Barbara Vucanovich (NV 2)

=== New Hampshire ===
Bill Zeliff (NH 1)	Charles Bass (NH 2)

=== New Jersey ===
James Hogan (NJ 1)	Frank LoBiondo (NJ 2)	Jim Saxton (NJ 3)	Chris Smith (NJ 4)	Marge Roukema (NJ 5)
Mike Herson (NJ 6)	Bob Franks (NJ 7)	William Martini (NJ 8)	Jim Ford (NJ 10)	Rodney Frelinghuysen (NJ 11)
Richard Zimmer (NJ 12)

=== New Mexico ===
Steven Schiff (NM 1)	Joseph Skeen (NM 2)	Gregg Bemis Jr. (NM 3)

=== New York ===
Michael Forbes (NY 1)	Rick Lazio (NY 2)	Peter King (NY 3)	Daniel Frisa (NY 4)	Grant Lally (NY 5)
David Askren (NY 8)	James McCall (NY 9)	Susan Molinari (NY 13)	Andrew Hartzell Jr. (NY 18)	Sue Kelly (NY 19)
Benjamin Gilman (NY 20)	Joseph Gomez (NY 21)	Gerald Solomon (NY 22)	Sherwood Boehlert (NY 23)	John McHugh (NY 24)
James Walsh (NY 25)	Bob Moppert (NY 26)	Bill Paxon (NY 27)	Renee Davison (NY 28)	Bill Miller (NY 29)
Jack Quinn (NY 30)

=== North Carolina ===
Ted Tyler (NC 1)	David Funderburk (NC 2)	Walter B. Jones Jr. (NC 3)	Fred Heineman (NC 4)	Richard Burr (NC 5)
Howard Coble (NC 6)	Robert Anderson (NC 7)	Sherill Morgan (NC 8)	Sue Myrick (NC 9)	Cass Ballenger (NC 10)
Charles Taylor (NC 11)

=== North Dakota ===
Gary Porter (ND, at large)

=== Ohio ===
Steve Chabot (OH 1)	Robert Portman (OH 2)	Dave Westbrock (OH 3)	Michael Oxley (OH 4)	Paul Gillmor (OH 5)
Frank Cremeans (OH 6)	David Hobson (OH 7)	John Boehner (OH 8)	Randy Whitman (OH 9)	Martin Hoke (OH 10)
John Kasich (OH 12)	Greg White (OH 13)	Lynn Slaby (OH 14)	Deborah Price (OH 15)	Ralph Regula (OH 16)
Mike Meister (OH 17)	Robert Ney (OH 18)	Steven LaTourette (OH 19)

=== Oklahoma ===
Steve Largent (OK 1)	J. C. Watts (OK 4)	Ernest Istook (OK 5)	Frank Lucas (OK 6)

=== Oregon ===
Bill Witt (OR 1)	Wes Cooley (OR 2)	John Newkirk (OR 4)

=== Pennsylvania ===
Roger Gordon (PA 1)	Lawrence Watson (PA 2)	Ed Peglow (PA 4)	Bill Clinger (PA 5)	Frederick Levering (PA 6)
Curt Weldon (PA 7)	James Greenwood (PA 8)	Bud Shuster (PA 9)	Joseph McDade (PA 10)	Jurij Podolak (PA 11)
Bill Choby (PA 12)	Jon Fox (PA 13)	John Clark (PA 14)	Robert Walker (PA 16)	George Gekas (PA 17)
John McCarry (PA 18)	William Goodling (PA 19)	Mike McCormick (PA 20)	Philip English (PA 21

=== Rhode Island ===
Kevin Vigilante (RI 1)	John Elliot (RI 2)

=== American Samoa ===
Amata Coleman Radewagen (Samoa, at large)

=== South Carolina ===
Mark Sanford (SC 1)	Floyd Spence (SC 2)	Lindsey Graham (SC 3)	Bob Inglis (SC 4)	Larry Bigham (SC 5)
Gary McLeod (SC 6 (candidate))

=== South Dakota ===
Jan Berkhout (SD, at large)

=== Tennessee ===
James Quillen (TN 1)	John Duncan (TN 2)	Zach Wamp (TN 3)	Van Hilleary (TN 4)	John Osborne (TN 5)
Steve Gill (TN 6)	Ed Bryant (TN 7)

=== Texas ===
Michael Blankenship (TX 1)	Donna Peterson (TX 2)	Sam Johnson (TX 3)	David Bridges (TX 4)	Pete Sessions (TX 5)
Joe Barton (TX 6)	William Archer (TX 7)	Jack Fields (TX 8)	Steve Stockman (TX 9)	Jo Baylor (TX 10)
Jim Broyles (TX 11)	Ernest Anderson Jr. (TX 12)	William Thornberry (TX 13)	Jim Deats (TX 14)	Tom Haughey (TX 15 (candidate))
Bobby Ortiz (TX 16)	Phil Boone (TX 17)	Jerry Burley (TX 18)	Larry Combest (TX 19)	Carl Colyer (TX 20)
Lamar S. Smith (TX 21)	Tom DeLay (TX 22)	Henry Bonilla (TX 23)	Gene Fontenot (TX 25)	Dick Armey (TX 26)
Erol Stone (TX 27)	David Slatter (TX 28)

=== Utah ===
James Hansen (UT 1)	Enid Greene (UT 2)	Dixie Thompson (UT 3)

=== Virginia ===
Herb Bateman (VA 1)	Jim Chapman (VA 2)	Tom Ward (VA 3)	George Sweet III (VA 4)	George Landrich III (VA 5)
Bob Goodlatte (VA 6)	Thomas Bliley (VA 7)	Kyle McSlarrow (VA 8)	Steve Fast (VA 9)	Frank Wolf (VA 10)
Tom Davis (VA 11)

=== Washington ===
Rick White (WA 1)	Jack Metcalf (WA 2)	Linda Smith (WA 3)	Richard Hastings (WA 4)	George Nethercutt (WA 5)
Jennifer Dunn (WA 8)	Randy Tate (WA 9)

=== West Virginia ===
Samuel Cravotta (WV 2)	Ben Waldman (WV 3)

=== Wisconsin ===
Mark Neumann (WI 1)	Scott Klug (WI 2)	Steve Gunderson (WI 3)	Tom Reynolds (WI 4)	Stephen Hollingshead (WI 5)
Thomas Petri (WI 6)	Scott West (WI 7)	Toby Roth (WI 8)	Jim Sensenbrenner (WI 9)

=== Wyoming ===
Barbara Cubin (WY, at large)

== See also ==
- Contract With America
- Republican Revolution
- United States House of Representatives elections, 1994
- 104 U.S. Congress
