= Jack Martin =

Jack Martin may refer to:

== In sports ==
=== Association football ===
- Jack Martin (footballer, born 1882) (1882–?), English footballer for Lincoln City, Blackburn Rovers, Hartlepools United in the 1900s/1910s
- Jack Martin (footballer, born 1903) (1903–1976), English football centre half for many teams in north-west England in the 1920s/1930s
- Jack Martin (footballer, born 1904) (1904–1984), English football outside left for Darlington, Leeds, Accrington Stanley, Bury, Doncaster in the 1920s/1930s
- Jack Martin (footballer, born 1935) (1935–), Scottish footballer, Full Back for Sheffield Wednesday and Rochdale

=== Other sports ===
- Jack Martin (baseball) (1887–1980), Major League Baseball player in the 1910s
- Jack Martin (cricketer) (1917–1987), English Test cricketer
- Jack Martin (coach) (1917–1977), American football, basketball, and track and field coach and college athletics administrator
- Jack Martin (American football) (1922–2008), American football player
- Jack Martin (basketball) (1922–2015), American college basketball coach
- Jack Martin (ice hockey) (born 1940), former ice hockey player in the National Hockey League
- Jack Martin (Australian footballer) (born 1995), Australian rules footballer for Geelong
- Jack Martin, known by his alias NiceWigg (Born 1997), American esports player and commentator
- Jack Martin (drag racer), American drag racing driver; see Jim Warren

== Other ==
- Jack Martin (Australian actor)
- Jack Martin (American actor)
- Jack Martin (executive), chairman and chief executive officer of Hill+Knowlton Strategies
- Jack Martin (investigator), New Orleans resident who claimed to have information about a conspiracy to assassinate President John F. Kennedy
- Jack Martin, protagonist of The Adventures of Smilin' Jack

== See also ==
- John Martin (disambiguation)
