= John Martyn (disambiguation) =

John Martyn (1948–2009) was a Scottish singer-songwriter.

John Martyn may also refer to:

- John Martyn (academic) (died 1473), master of University College, Oxford, England
- John Martyn (botanist) (1699–1768), British botanist and author of Historia plantarum rariorum
- John Martyn (publisher) (died 1680), London publisher and bookseller
- John Martyn (schoolmaster) (1903–1984), second headmaster of The Doon School, India
- John Burton Martyn (1867–1921), Ontario physician and political figure
- John Martyn (Leicester MP), MP for Leicester
- John Martyn (died 1627), MP for Nottingham
- John Martyn (MP for Scarborough), MP for Scarborough
- John Martyn (MP for Wycombe), for Wycombe
- John Martyn (priest), Dean of Bangor from 1371 to 1382
- Johnny Martyn (1934–2007), musician and coffee bar manager

== See also ==
- John Martin (disambiguation)
- J. Thomas Marten (born 1951), American judge
