= Jonathan Martin =

Jonathan Martin may refer to:

- Jonathan Martin (arsonist) (1782–1838), English arsonist
- Jonathan Martín (footballer) (born 1981), Spanish footballer
- Jonathan Martin (American football) (born 1989), American football offensive tackle
- Jonathan Martin (journalist) (born c. 1977), American journalist
- Jonathan Martin (Florida politician), member of the Florida Senate

== See also ==
- John Martin (disambiguation)
