= Congressional Accountability Act of 1995 =

The Congressional Accountability Act of 1995 (CAA) (Pub. L. 104–1 (text) (PDF)), the first piece of legislation passed by the 104th United States Congress, applied several civil rights, labor, and workplace safety and health laws to the U.S. Congress and its associated agencies, requiring them to follow many of the same employment and workplace safety laws applied to businesses and the federal government. Previously, agencies in the legislative branch had been exempt from these laws. The act also established a dispute resolution procedure as an alternative to filing claims in federal court. The act is administered and enforced by the Office of Congressional Workplace Rights.

The Congressional Accountability Act was passed by vote of 98–1 in the Senate and 390–0 in the House. The law was the first plank in the Contract with America, the Republican Party agenda for the 1994 Congressional elections.

The act was amended by the passage of the Office of Compliance Administrative and Technical Corrections Act of 2015.(H.R. 1213, Pub. L. 114–6 (text) (PDF))

== Specific laws applied ==
The CAA applies twelve specific laws to the U.S. Congress and its associated agencies, giving various rights to the 30,000 employees in the legislative branch.

- Americans with Disabilities Act of 1990. Offices in the legislative branch must make their public services, programs, activities, and places of public accommodation accessible to members of the public who have a disability.
- Age Discrimination in Employment Act of 1967. Employees 40 years old or older cannot be discriminated against in personnel actions because of their age.
- Federal Service Labor-Management Relations Statute. Certain legislative branch employees have the right to join a union and collectively bargain with an employing office.
- Rehabilitation Act of 1973. Employees cannot be discriminated against in personnel actions because of a disability, and offices may be required to accommodate the special needs of a person with a disability.
- Title VII of the Civil Rights Act of 1964. Employees cannot be harassed or discriminated against in personnel actions because of their race, color, religion, sex, or national origin.
- Fair Labor Standards Act of 1938. Employees must get paid at least the current minimum wage, and certain employees are entitled to overtime pay.
- Family and Medical Leave Act of 1993. Employees are entitled to 12 weeks of leave from work for certain family and medical reasons.
- Worker Adjustment and Retraining Notification Act of 1989. Employees are entitled to be given advance notice of an office closing or mass layoff.
- Occupational Safety and Health Act of 1970. Workplaces in the legislative branch must be free of hazards that are likely to cause death or serious injury.
- Employee Polygraph Protection Act of 1988. With limited exceptions, employees cannot be required to take polygraph (lie detector) tests.
- Veterans' employment and reemployment rights in Chapter 43 of Title 38 of the United States Code, and amended in 1998 to include portions of the Veterans Employment Opportunities Act of 1998. Employees cannot be discriminated against for past or present duty in the uniformed services, and those who leave work to perform uniformed service are entitled to be reemployed in their old job after a service obligation ends.

== Criticism ==
Due to revelations related to Harvey Weinstein's alleged sexual offenses and other sexual victims, the Congress has been criticized for lack of regular civil rights protections for its workers against sexual harassment by Members. Many have advocated for changes in the Congressional Accountability Act in light of these scandals.
