= Jacques Martin =

Jacques Martin may refer to:

- Jacques Martin (athlete) (1959–2012), Canadian Paralympian
- Jacques Martin (comics) (1921–2010), French writer and artist of comics
- Jacques Martin (cyclist) (1953–2004), Belgian cyclist
- Jacques Martin (ice hockey) (born 1952), hockey coach
- Jacques Martin (pacifist) (1906–2001), French pacifist, conscientious objector and Protestant pastor; Righteous Among the Nations
- Jacques Martin (TV host) (1933–2007), French TV host and producer

== See also ==
- Jacques-Paul Martin (1908–1992), French curial cardinal
- Jack Martin (disambiguation)
