= Susan Robfogel =

American lawyer

Susan S. Robfogel is a partner in Nixon Peabody LLP and a member and immediate past chair of the United States Congress Office of Compliance, an independent agency within the U.S. Congress established to administer the application of various civil rights, labor, and workplace laws to Congressional employees. She served as Chair of the Board of Trustees of George Eastman House International Museum of Photography and Film from July 2007 until July 2011.
