= Benny Andrew =

Scottish footballer

Personal information
- Date of birth: 5 February 1973 (age 53)
- Place of birth: Perth, Scotland
- Position: Winger

Senior career*
Years	Team	Apps	(Gls)
- Lochore Welfare
1990–1997	East Fife	109	(8)
1997–1999	Montrose	52	(5)
1999–2010	Glenrothes		
Total		161	(13)

Managerial career
- 2014–2016: Glenrothes
- * Club domestic league appearances and goals as of 14:03, 29 September 2016 (UTC)

Benjamin Andrew (born 5 February 1973), is a former professional footballer who has played in the Scottish Football League First Division for East Fife.

== Career ==
Andrew began his professional career with East Fife and was part of the squad that won promotion to the SFL First Division in 1996. The Methil side only won two games the following year in the second tier of Scottish football, however Andrew did score in their first and only home victory that season against Falkirk. After a short spell at Montrose, Andrew joined Junior side Glenrothes in 1999 where he remained for eleven seasons and earned a testimonial match against a Celtic XI in 2009.

Andrew returned to Glenrothes as manager in November 2014 but resigned from his position in September 2016.
