= John F. Martin =

Member of Catholic order (1927–1933)

John F. Martin was the Deputy Supreme Knight of the Knights of Columbus from 1927 to 1933. He was first elected to the Board of Directors at the Supreme Convention in 1912 at Colorado Springs.
