= Jack Martin (footballer, born 1882) =

English footballer (1882–after 1911)

Personal information
- Full name: John Martin
- Date of birth: 1882
- Place of birth: South Shields, England
- Height: 5 ft 11 1/2 in (1.82 m)
- Position: Centre forward

Senior career*
Years	Team	Apps	(Gls)
- Tyne Dock N.E.R.
- Kingston Villa
- South Shields
1904–1906	Lincoln City	65	(30)
1906–1908	Blackburn Rovers	57	(25)
1908–1909	Brighton & Hove Albion	37	(18)
1909–1911	Millwall Athletic	70	(24)
1911–1912	Hartlepools United	17	(8)
- New Seaham Gymnasium
- * Club domestic league appearances and goals

John Martin (1882 – after 1911) was an English professional footballer who scored 55 goals from 122 appearances in the Football League playing as a centre forward for Lincoln City and Blackburn Rovers. He also played Southern League football for Brighton & Hove Albion and Millwall Athletic and in the North-Eastern League for Hartlepools United.

== Life and career ==
Martin was born in 1882 in South Shields, County Durham. He played football for Tyne Dock N.E.R., from which he joined Wearside League club Kingston Villa ahead of the 1902–03 season. He spent two seasons with the club, and was selected for a Wearside League representative team in 1904, before moving into the Football League with Lincoln City.

He made his debut on 3 September 1904 in a 2–0 win away to Doncaster Rovers in the Second Division. In the following season, Martin was the club's leading scorer, with 20 goals from League and FA Cup games. This earned him a transfer to the First Division with Blackburn Rovers. In his first season, he was Blackburn's leading scorer with 17 League goals from 36 games: at 5 ft 11 1/2 in (1.82 m) in height and not lightly built, he used his physical strengths well. In his second, he faced competition for the centre-forward position, and a poorer goal return left the player reportedly unhappy with both himself and the club.

He spent the 1908–09 season with Brighton & Hove Albion, where he scored 18 goals from 37 Southern League appearances. He then played for Millwall Athletic, where he led the Lions in scoring in the 1909–10 and 1910–11 seasons, with 12 goals from 39 and 31 matches respectively, before returning to the north-east to spend the 1911–12 season with Hartlepools United of the North Eastern League.
