= John Martin (priest) =

Anglican priest in Ireland (1797–1878)

John Charles Martin (4 November 1797 - 17 January 1878) was a 19th-century Anglican priest in Ireland.

Martin was born in Cork and educated at Trinity College, Dublin. He was Archdeacon of Kilmore from 1866 until his death.
