= John Martin (American football) =

American football player and coach

Biographical details
- Born: May 7, 1895

Playing career
- 1917–1919: Oberlin

Coaching career (HC unless noted)
- 1920–1921: Wesleyan (assistant)
- 1922–1924: Wesleyan

Head coaching record
- Overall: 9–13

John Frederick Martin (May 7, 1895 – ?) was an American college football player and coach. He played football for Oberlin College. He later served as a coach at Wesleyan University. He was hired as an assistant football coach at Wesleyan in 1920 and became the head football coach in 1922. In three seasons as the head football coach at Wesleyan, Martin compiled a record of 9–13. Martin also coached track and field at Wesleyan.
