= Contract with the Italians =

2001 political agenda of Silvio Berlusconi

The Contract with the Italians (Italian: Contratto con gli Italiani) is a document presented and signed by Silvio Berlusconi on May 8, 2001, during the television program Porta a Porta.

With this document, Berlusconi—then leader of the opposition—committed, in the event of an electoral victory, to implement various reforms summarized in five key points. He also pledged that if he failed to achieve at least four of the five objectives, he would not seek re-election.

== History ==
The idea for the Contract with the Italians did not originate with Silvio Berlusconi. Instead, it was directly inspired by Newt Gingrich's Contract with America, introduced six weeks before the 1994 U.S. Congressional elections. The concept was adapted by Berlusconi's advisor, Luigi Crespi.

== The "Contract" text ==
Contract with the Italians,

Between Silvio Berlusconi, born September 29, 1936, in Milan, leader of Forza Italia and of the Casa delle Libertà coalition, in agreement with all coalition partners, and the Italian citizens, the following is agreed:

Silvio Berlusconi, in the event of an electoral victory by Casa delle Libertà, pledges as Prime Minister to achieve the following objectives within five years:

1. Reduction of the tax burden:
  - Full tax exemption for incomes up to 22 million lire per year (€11,362.05);;
  - A 23% tax rate for incomes up to 200 million lire per year (€103,291.38);
  - A 33% tax rate for incomes above 200 million lire per year (€103,291.38);
  - Abolition of inheritance and donations taxes.
2. Implementation of a "Plan for the Protection of Citizens and Crime Prevention", including the introduction of a "district police officer" in urban areas, aimed at significantly reducing crime from the current figure of 3 million offenses annually.
3. Raising the minimum pension to at least 1 million lire per month (€516.46).
4. Halving the unemployment rate through the creation of at least 1.5 million new jobs.
5. Launching construction work on at least 40% of the projects planned under the "Ten-Year Plan for Major Works" (Piano Decennale per le Grandi Opere), including roads, highways, subways, railways, water networks, and flood prevention infrastructure.

Should fewer than four of these five objectives be achieved by the end of the five-year term, Silvio Berlusconi formally agrees not to seek re-election.

In witness,

Silvio Berlusconi The contract shall be validated and come into effect on May 13, 2001, by the vote of the Italian electorate.

== Debate on the fulfillment of the five points ==
A significant public debate arose over whether the five pledges were fulfilled.

Silvio Berlusconi repeatedly claimed that four of the five objectives were met. He attributed the failure to lower tax rates to internal opposition within the center-right coalition.

According to sociologist Luca Ricolfi, when asked if Berlusconi had honored the contract, he responded: "No. He should not have run again if he were a man of honor. Only one promise—raising pensions—was fully kept. On average, Berlusconi fulfilled only 60% of his promises."

Journalists Marco Travaglio and Peter Gomez wrote in their book Le mille balle blu that none of the five pledges were actually fulfilled, concluding ironically: "Despite failing all five objectives, Silvio Berlusconi ran again. Thus, he also broke the sixth and final commitment."

=== Reduction of the tax burden ===
Berlusconi promised a two-rate system: 23% for incomes up to €100,000, and 33% for incomes above that threshold, with tax exemption for incomes under €11,000 and full abolition of inheritance and donations taxes.

Although some changes to tax brackets were introduced, the dual-rate system was never implemented. However, inheritance and donations taxes were abolished for estates above €180,759.91.

According to Istat, the overall tax burden fell by only 0.1% from 2001 to 2004 (from 40.7% to 40.6%). Government estimates claimed a drop from 42.2% to 41.8%. However, Travaglio and Gomez argued that when local taxes and fees are considered, the tax burden actually increased.

=== Decrease in crime ===
District police officers were gradually introduced. By August 2005, approximately 2,200 had been deployed, covering about 500 districts of 10,000 inhabitants each—roughly 9% of the population.

However, crime did not decrease. From 2001 to 2003, offenses rose by 6.7% annually, and in 2004, criminal charges leading to prosecution rose by 3.7%.

Moreover, ISTAT data from 2001 recorded 2,163,826 crimes, not 3 million as cited in the contract.

=== Increase of minimum pensions ===
According to the Italian Labour Union (UIL), in 2001 there were about 5.9 million pensioners receiving less than 1 million lire per month. By 2002, this number had grown to 8 million, based on data from economist Tito Boeri.

The pension increase was applied to only 1.8 million people—roughly 25% of the total. Extending the benefit to all low-income retirees would have cost between €11 and €17 billion (about 1.5% of GDP).

The government limited the increase to pensioners over 70 years old and with combined household incomes below €6,800 per year—conditions not mentioned in the Contract.

=== Halving unemployment ===
The goal of halving unemployment was not achieved. According to Eurostat in January 2001 the unemployment rate was 9.9%. By 2006, the rate had dropped to 7.1%—a historic low, but still short of the target.

While employment reached a record high of 22.5 million in 2006, the net increase was 1,074,000 jobs. After subtracting 343,000 workers legalized through amnesties, the actual figure was closer to 700,000 new jobs.

=== Opening of construction sites ===
The contract pledged that at least 40% of the planned investments under the Ten-Year Plan would be under construction.

Infrastructure Minister Pietro Lunardi claimed that if ongoing and contracted projects were combined, the 45% threshold would be met by June 2006. However, as of January 2006, only 21.4% of investments had resulted in actual construction site openings. Later projections suggested a potential increase to 25.4%. The time between project assignment and site opening—unaccounted for in the contract—was a key factor.

== Legal value of the Contract with the Italians ==
In January 2009, a civil court in Milan ruled that the Contract with the Italians held no legal value and was therefore not binding. Berlusconi was under no legal obligation to fulfill its terms.

== Bibliography ==
- Peter Gomez, Marco Travaglio. Le mille balle blu, BUR Biblioteca Universale Rizzoli, 2006, ISBN 88-17-00943-1
- Luca Ricolfi. Dossier Italia. A che punto è il "Contratto con gli italiani", Bologna, Il Mulino, 2005
- Luca Ricolfi. Tempo scaduto. Il «Contratto con gli italiani» alla prova dei fatti, Bologna, Il Mulino, 2006, ISBN 88-15-10888-2
