= John Martin (Canadian artist) =

British-Canadian artist (1904–1965)

John Martin RCA (1904-1965) was a British-Canadian etcher and textile printer. His works are in the collections of the Montreal Museum of Fine Arts, the National Gallery of Canada, and the Vancouver Art Gallery.

== Career ==
Martin was born in Nuneaton, England, in 1904. He studied art at the Kind Edward VI School, the Slade School of Art, and at the Birmingham School of Art, respectively, during which he was introduced to the Plein Air technique and influenced by the English Landscape School. Martin moved to Canada in 1924 and, in 1926, was hired at a textile firm named H.P. Ritchie in Toronto, Ontario. For the next several years, Martin worked for other various other firms while gaining renown for his own personal art practice. In 1931, after receiving encouragement from Arthur Lismer, Martin began entering his work in various exhibitions organized by the Ontario Society of Artists.

In 1945, Martin became Director of Design at the Ontario College of Art in Toronto. There he taught Michael Snow, who has since remarked on Martin's positive influence on his work. In 1953, he moved to Ayr, Ontario, and taught at Ridley College while continuing to guest lecture for various art associations throughout Ontario.

He was killed by a drunk driver in Ayr, Ontario, on 6 November 1965.

== Affiliations ==
Martin was a member of the Society of Canadian Painter-Etchers and Engravers (1938), the Ontario Society of Artists (1940), the Royal Canadian Academy of the Arts (1951), the International Institute of Arts and Letters (1960), and the Canadian Group of Painters (1960).
