= John Martin (cricketer, born 1846) =

English cricketer and barrister

Personal information
- Full name: John Stapleton Martin
- Born: 15 March 1846; Holborn, Middlesex, England
- Died: 26 September 1922 (aged 76); Norton-juxta-Kempsey, Warwickshire, England
- Batting: Right-handed

Domestic team information
- Years: Team
- 1871: Marylebone Cricket Club

Career statistics
Competition	First-class
Matches	3
Runs scored	107
Batting average	35.66
100s/50s	–/1
Top score	51*
Catches/stumpings	1/–
- Source: Cricinfo, 10 June 2021

John Stapleton Martin (15 March 1846 – 26 September 1922) was an English first-class cricketer and barrister.

The son of the barrister Marcus Martin, he was born at Holborn in March 1846. He was educated in Wimbledon, before going up to Christ's College, Cambridge. He trialled for Cambridge University Cricket Club in freshman matches, but did not feature for the club in first-class cricket. He graduated from Cambridge in 1871, and as a member of the Middle Temple he was called to the bar in the same year. Additionally in 1871, Martin played first-class cricket for the Marylebone Cricket Club, making three appearances against Cambridge University, Gloucestershire and Oxford University. He scored 107 runs in his three matches, with a highest score of 51 not out against Cambridge University. Martin died in September 1922 at Norton-juxta-Kempsey, Warwickshire. His will requested his children be raised as Protestants and teetotallers, in addition to discussing his fear of being buried alive.
