= Office of Congressional Workplace Rights =

US agency protecting workers

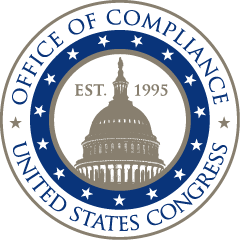
Office of Compliance logo

The Office of Congressional Workplace Rights (OCWR; formerly the Office of Compliance) was created through the Congressional Accountability Act of 1995 (CAA) which applied workplace protection laws to approximately 30,000 employees of the legislative branch nationwide and established the Office of Compliance to administer and ensure the integrity of the Act through its programs of dispute resolution, education, and enforcement. The OCWR educates members of Congress, employing offices and employees, and the visiting public on their rights and responsibilities under workplace and accessibility laws. The OCWR also advises Congress on needed changes and amendments to the CAA; and the OCWR's General Counsel has independent investigatory and enforcement authority for certain violations of the CAA.

The OCWR has a five-member, non-partisan Board of Directors and four executive staff, appointed by the Board, who carry out the day-to-day functions of the Agency. The Office also employs professional staff on Capitol Hill who educate, communicate, inspect, litigate, and otherwise run its operations.

== History ==
On January 23, 1995, the CAA became the first bill signed into law for the 104th Congress. The legislation applied 11 civil rights, safety, labor, and public access federal laws to the Legislative Branch, including Title VII of the Civil Rights Act, the Family Medical Leave Act (FMLA), the Fair Labor Standards Act (FLSA), the Occupational Safety and Health Act (OSHAct), the Uniformed Service Employment and Reemployment Rights Act (USERRA), and the Americans with Disabilities Act (ADA), among others. The law also established the OCWR to ensure compliance with the CAA and provide an outreach and education program for Legislative Branch employers. On January 23, 1996, the OOC officially opened.

The OCWR enforces several federal workplace and public access laws to the Legislative Branch through programs of dispute resolution, investigation, and education. The OCWR administers a mandatory, multi-step dispute resolution process that all employees must follow in order to process their claims under the CAA and supervises and certifies bargaining unit elections. The OCWR General Counsel routinely inspects Legislative Branch offices and facilities to ensure compliance with OSHAct and ADA standards. The Office is also tasked with educating congressional employees and employing offices about their rights and responsibilities under the CAA and maintains a website with educational publications and on-line trainings.

== Leadership ==
The OCWR's current Board of Directors includes Board Chair Barbara L. Camens, Principal Proprietor, Barr & Camens; Alan V. Friedman, Partner, Munger, Tolles & Olson LLP; Roberta L. Holzwarth, Partner, Holmstrom & Kennedy, P.C.; Susan S. Robfogel, Of Counsel, Nixon Peabody LLP; and Barbara Childs Wallace, Of Counsel, Wise, Carter, Child & Caraway, P.A. Susan Tsui Grundmann, the former Chair of the U.S. Merit Systems Protection Board, joined the OOC as executive director in January 2017.

== FY2017 profile ==
In fiscal year 2017, the OOC received 185 general information requests from covered employees, which included OOC counselors providing informal advice and information regarding workplace issues and how to obtain an early resolution to a dispute. There were 47 requests for confidential counseling, the first step in the OOC's formal dispute resolution process, of which, 30 proceeded to new mediation cases. At the close of the fiscal year, 10 of those cases were resolved in mediation; five cases resulted in U.S. District Court claims; eight were in the waiting period to file a complaint; 14 were pending mediation; and five resulted in an administrative complaint. There were two new appeals filed with the OOC Board of Directors for appellate review. In FY2017, eight matters settled for a total amount of $934,754.

The OOC's Office of General Counsel inspected areas including the U.S. Botanic Garden, several Library of Congress buildings, House Members' offices, the AOC Construction Division, and the U.S. Capitol Police. There were five new occupational safety and health investigations. On March 14, 2017, the OOC awarded Safety Recognition Awards to 69 Senate offices and 88 House offices that were hazard free during occupational safety and health inspections from the 114th Congress. In FY2017, the OOC conducted inspections to ensure public services and accommodations complied with Titles II and III of the ADA, focusing on the Library of Congress Madison and Adams buildings, Rayburn and Cannon House Office Buildings, and the exterior route adjacent to the O'Neil Federal Office Building. The OOC also processed several labor-management matters.

The OOC's FY2017 education and outreach included providing in-person training to managers and staff on the OOC's jurisdiction and administrative dispute resolution process. This included sponsoring a seminar on heat stress and developing education materials on common office safety hazards, the OOC safety and health inspections, and other safety and health topics. The OOC also released a new training module on ADA compliance and a technical guide to help legislative staff identify common barriers to access in meeting and office spaces.

== 115th Congress ==
The U.S. Senate and House of Representatives implemented several measures to address allegations of sexual harassment in legislative offices during the 115th Congress. Senate Resolution 330 requires all Members, officers and employees to take workplace harassment training each Congress. House Resolution 630 requires all House employees to complete in-person discrimination and harassment training within 90 days of the beginning of a new Congress. The U.S. House also passed House Resolution 724, which requires all House offices to adopt an anti-harassment and anti-discrimination policy, creates an Office of Employee Advocacy to assist House employees with matters before the OOC and Committee on Ethics, prohibits using House payroll funds or Members' Representational Allowance to pay settlements or awards resulting from conduct that violates the CAA, and bars Members from engaging in sexual relationships or unwelcome sexual advances with staff.

There have also been several bills filed proposing major reforms to the OOC and the CAA's procedures during the 115th Congress. The Consolidated Appropriations Act, 2018 added Library of Congress employees to the CAA's jurisdiction. H.R. 4924, which passed the House on February 6, 2018, would eliminate the CAA counseling and mediation requirements, require Members of Congress and non-congressional offices to pay for awards or settlements for alleged misconduct under the CAA, rename the OOC to the Office of Congressional Workplace Rights, and require non-congressional offices to develop a training program regarding employee rights under the CAA. among other things. No major CAA reform legislation has passed the Senate.

== See also ==
- United States Merit Systems Protection Board
