= John D. Martin (author) =

John David Martin (born 1945) is an American finance and business professor and author currently holding the Carr P. Collins Chair of Finance at Baylor University. Another notable named chair position he has held was the First Republic Bank Centennial Professor of Business Administration and subsequently also the Eugene McDermott Centennial Professor of Banking and Finance at the University of Texas at Austin.
