= John Jeffries Martin =

American academic (born 1951)

- Born: August 1, 1951 (age 75); Boston, Mass.
- Education: St. Paul's School
- Alma mater: Harvard University
- Occupation: Historian
- Employer: Duke University

John Jeffries Martin (born August 1, 1951) is a historian of early modern Europe, with a special interest in the histories of religion and society in the sixteenth and seventeenth centuries.

== Early life ==
John Jeffries Martin grew up on St. Simons Island, Georgia and attended St. Paul's School in Concord, New Hampshire. He earned a PhD from Harvard University in 1982.

== Career ==
Martin is professor and former chair of History at Duke University . He also served as chair of History at Trinity University where he taught from 1982 to 2007.

Martin's publications have explored the histories of sixteenth-century Venice, the invention of sincerity, Renaissance individualism, and early modern apocalypticism. He is, in addition, the editor or co-editor of four volumes. In Venice’s Hidden Enemies: Italian Heretics in a Renaissance City, Martin writes about the European Protestants who moved to Venice and were falsely accused of heresy by Venetians in the sixteenth century. Reviewing it for The American Historical Review, Professor William Monter of Northwestern University described it as a "useful, readable and original book." His most recent book "A Beautiful Ending: The Apocalyptic Imagination and the Making of the Modern World," by contrast, places its emphasis on the role of faith—not only within Christianity but also within Judaism and in Islam—in animating individual and collective actions in the early modern world. Indeed, faith did much to shape agency, and played a role in fostering new political, religious, and scientific visions of a more hopeful future. At the same time, many horrors—from civil wars to colonialism—also stemmed from the "apocalyptic imagination."

== Works ==
- A Beautiful Ending: The Apocalyptic Imagination and the Making of the Modern World (London and New Haven: Yale University Press, 2022).
- Myths of Renaissance Individualism (New York: Palgrave MacMillan, 2004).
- Venice's Hidden Enemies: Italian Heretics in a Renaissance City (Baltimore: Johns Hopkins University Press, 2003).
- editor with Dennis Romano, Venice Reconsidered: The History and Civilization of an Italian City-state, 1297-1797 (Baltimore: Johns Hopkins University Press, 2000).
- editor, The Renaissance: Italy and Abroad (London: Routledge, 2003).
- editor with Ronald K. Delph and Michelle Fontaine, Heresy, Culture, and Religion in Early Modern Italy: Contexts and Contestations. (Kirksville: Truman State University Press, 2006).
- editor, The Renaissance World (New York: Routledge, 2007).
