= Years of Mud =

The expression Years of Mud (Italian: Anni di fango) is used to identify a period of Italian history that coincides roughly with the 1980s. This expression is now in the common language to describe a long period of time marked by particularly adverse events. It refers to a strong negative opinion of a decade in which Italian companies, despite their economic prosperity and the beginning of the technological development that took place in those years, began a steady decline due to a particularly corrupt political class, and sometimes colluding with criminal organizations such as Cosa Nostra (the Sicilian Mafia). At that time, the Propaganda Due, a secret Masonic organization, was also discovered.

The expression owes its success primarily to the Italian journalist Indro Montanelli, which he called L'Italia degli anni di fango (Italy of the Years of Mud) the volume of Storia d'Italia dedicated to the years 1978-1993, a period that begins roughly with the election of Sandro Pertini as President of the Italian Republic and ends with the discovery and the start of Tangentopoli. The book is the sequel to L'Italia degli anni di piombo (Italy of the Years of Lead), dedicated to the 1970s. Both volumes were written in collaboration with journalist Mario Cervi.
