= Brunella Gasperini =

Italian journalist and novelist

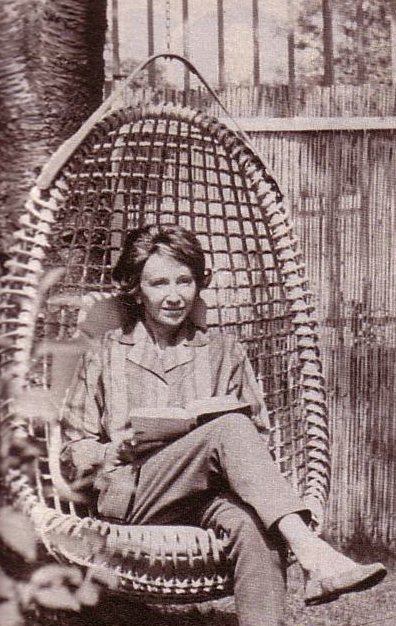
- Born: December 22, 1918; Milan
- Died: January 7, 1979 (aged 60); Milan
- Occupations: Journalist, novelist
- Writing career
- Genre: Novel
- Notable works: Ero io quella (1960), Noi e loro (1965)

Brunella Gasperini, pen name of Bianca Robecchi (Milan, 22 December 1918 – Milan, 7 January 1979) was an Italian journalist and novelist.

== Biography ==
She spent most of her life between Milan, her birthplace, and San Mamete, a small hamlet in Valsolda, on Lake Lugano.

After a short experience as a teacher in the immediate post-war period, she started writing for the newspaper Il Corriere della Sera and many Rizzoli magazines in the early 1950s, distinguishing herself for her modern and progressive point of view on the problems that would dominate Italian society in the following years. Her column Ditelo a Brunella ("Tell Brunella"), where she established a direct and frank dialogue with her readers on such themes as divorce, abortion, family and politics, appeared on Annabella for twenty-five years. She dealt with similar issues in her column Lettere a Candida ("Letters to Candida"), in the magazine Novella.

In 1956 she published her first novel, L'estate dei bisbigli (previously issued in instalments in Annabella), followed by Io e loro: cronache di un marito (1959), Rosso di sera (1964), A scuola si muore (1975) and Grazie lo stesso, all published by Rizzoli. Her non-fiction work includes the humouristic handbook manual Il galateo di Brunella Gasperini (Sonzogno, 1975) and her autobiography Una donna e altri animali (Rizzoli, 1978).

A selection of her editorials and of the letters published in Annabella was collected posthumously in Così la penso io (Rizzoli, 1979) and Più botte che risposte (Rizzoli, 1981).

Her books have been translated and successfully published into several languages, such as German, French, Spanish, Hungarian. From her marriage to Adelmo Gasperini (called Mino by everyone and “life mate” by Brunella) she had two children, Massimo (1946-2013), a sculptor, and Nicoletta (1950-1989), herself a journalist, who wrote assiduously for different fashion and music magazines.

== Bibliography ==
=== Fiction ===
- 1956 L'estate dei bisbigli, Rizzoli
- 1957 Le vie del vento, Rizzoli
- 1957 Fanali gialli, Rizzoli
- 1958 Le note blu, Rizzoli
- 1958 Le ragazze della villa accanto, Rizzoli
- 1959 Io e loro: cronache di un marito, Rizzoli
- 1960 Ero io quella, Rizzoli
- 1961 Lui e noi: cronache di una moglie, Rizzoli
- 1964 Rosso di sera, Rizzoli
- 1965 Noi e loro: cronache di una figlia, Rizzoli
- 1970 I fantasmi nel cassetto, Edizioni di Novissima
- 1973 Luna straniera, AMZ
- 1974 Siamo in famiglia, Rizzoli
- 1975 A scuola si muore, Rizzoli
- 1975 Il buio alle spalle, AMZ
- 1976 Grazie lo stesso, Rizzoli
- 1976 Storie d'amore storie d'allegria (short stories), Rizzoli
- 1978 Una donna e altri animali, Rizzoli

=== Other ===
- 1957 Dopo di lei, signora, Rizzoli
- 1958 Cos'è una donna: problemi e segreti delle adolescenti, Marietti
- 1960 Sposarsi è facile ma..., Rizzoli
- 1975 I problemi sessuali e psicologici dell'adolescenza, AMZ
- 1975 I problemi sessuali e psicologici prima del matrimonio, AMZ
- 1975 Cos'è conoscersi: problemi e rapporti col tuo ragazzo, Marietti
- 1975 Il galateo di Brunella Gasperini, Sonzogno
- 1976 I problemi sessuali e psicologici della coppia, AMZ
- 1976 Di chi è la colpa: capire e risolvere i problemi del matrimonio, Marietti
- 1979 Così la penso io, Rizzoli
- 1981 Più botte che risposte (collection of letters to Annabella), Rizzoli
