= Beppe Severgnini =

Italian journalist, essayist, and columnist (born 1956)

Beppe Severgnini OBE
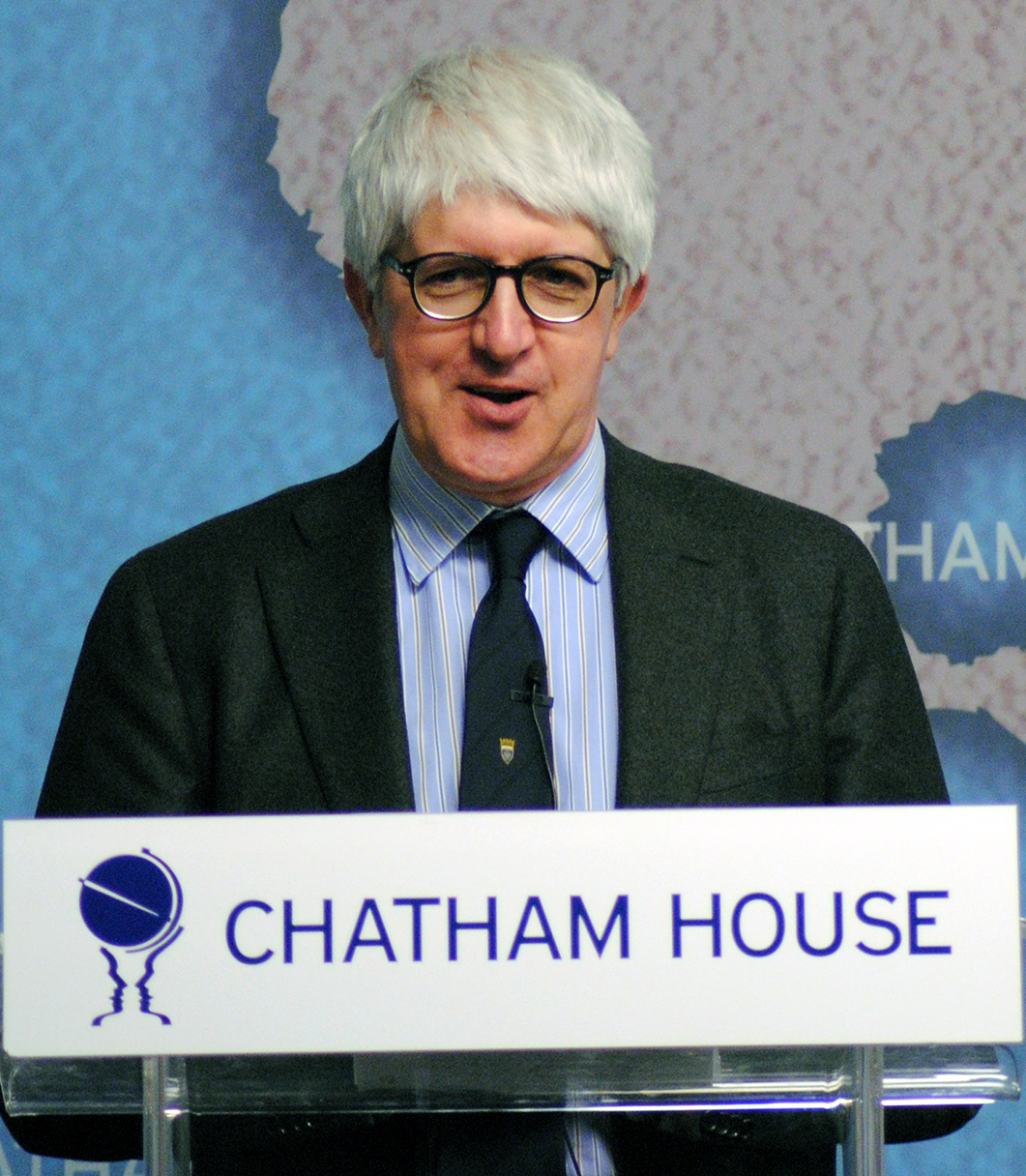
- Born: Giuseppe Severgnini; 26 December 1956 (age 69); Crema, Italy
- Education: University of Pavia
- Occupations: Journalist, essayist, columnist
- Height: 1.76 m (5 ft 9 in)
- Spouse: Ortensia Marazzi
- Children: 1
- Awards: Officer of the Most Excellent Order of the British Empire; Commander of the Order of Merit of the Italian Republic

Giuseppe "Beppe" Severgnini OBE, Commendatore OMRI (Italian pronunciation: [ˈbɛppe severˈɲiːni]; born 26 December 1956) is an Italian journalist, essayist, and columnist.

== Biography ==
Born in Crema, Lombardy, Severgnini graduated in law at the University of Pavia. His father was a public notary. His career in journalism began when, aged 24, he joined the Milan daily newspaper Il Giornale, headed by Italian journalist Indro Montanelli; he soon distinguished himself as a writer and became the paper's London correspondent.

For Il Giornale, in the period leading up to the fall of Communism, Severgnini worked as special correspondent from Russia, China and several Eastern European countries. When Montanelli left Il Giornale to found La Voce, Severgnini followed him. He was also seconded to The Economist in London (1993) then served as correspondent for La Voce from Washington. He was a correspondent from Italy for The Economist between 1996 and 2003, for which he still occasionally writes. He was a contributing opinion writer for The New York Times from 2013 to 2021.

Following the failure of Montanelli's project at La Voce, Severgnini joined in 1995 the Corriere della Sera, Italy's biggest newspaper, for which he still is an op-ed columnist and an editor. Since 1998, he hosts a daily column for the online edition of the Corriere della Sera called Italians, originally targeting Italian expatriates; it has steadily grown in popularity since, eventually becoming one of the most read regular features of the newspaper's website. An enthusiastic soccer fan, he also wrote for the popular sports newspaper La Gazzetta dello Sport from 2001 to 2011. Severgnini appears regularly on radio and TV programs on RAI, La7, NPR and the BBC. He was the host of a talk show on SKY TG24 from 2004 to 2011 and for RAI in 2015 and 2016.

Severgnini is the author of twenty books, including the American bestsellers Ciao, America! An Italian Discovers the U.S. and La Bella Figura: A Field Guide to the Italian Mind. His most recent books are Off the Rail – A Train Trip Through Life (Berkley, New York 2019) and Neoitaliani (Rizzoli, Milan 2020), which was published in 2022 in the US as Italian Lessons: 50 Things We Know About Life Now (Viking Penguin Books USA)

Severgnini taught at the Walter Tobagi graduate School of Journalism at the University of Milan (2010–2020). He has been a research fellow/writer in residence at MIT/Massachusetts Institute of Technology (2009), Isaiah Berlin Visiting Scholar at Oxford University (2013) and a visiting fellow at Ca' Foscari Venezia (2013); he has taught also at Middlebury College Vermont (2006), and at the universities of Milan-Bocconi (2003 and 2006), Parma (1998) and Pavia (2002), which elected him Alumnus of the Year in 1998 and 2011.

Severgnini was made Officer of the Order of the British Empire in 2001 by Queen Elizabeth II. He was also made Commendatore of the Order of Merit of the Italian Republic by President Giorgio Napolitano in 2011. He is a Roman Catholic but criticises the Church for its opposition to anti-homophobic violence laws.

== Bibliography ==
- Parlar sul Serio. Storie di Crema, 1979-1981, Crema, Artigrafiche Leva, 1981 (in Italian).
- Inglesi, Milano, Rizzoli, 1990 (in Italian). ISBN 88-17-84010-6
- L'inglese. Lezioni semiserie, Milano, Rizzoli, 1992 (in Italian). ISBN 88-17-84165-X
- Italiani con valigia. Il Belpaese in viaggio, Milano, Rizzoli, 1993 (in Italian). ISBN 88-17-84264-8
- L'inglese. Nuove lezioni semiserie, Milano, Biblioteca universale Rizzoli, 1994 (in Italian). ISBN 88-17-11871-0
- Un italiano in America, Milano, Rizzoli, 1995 (in Italian). ISBN 88-17-84415-2
- Confronti, Milano, Rizzoli, 1996 (in Italian). ISBN 88-17-84501-9
- Italiani si diventa, Milano, Rizzoli, 1998 (in Italian). ISBN 88-17-85261-9
- Manuale dell'imperfetto viaggiatore, Milano, Rizzoli, 2000 (in Italian). ISBN 88-17-86361-0
- Interismi. Il piacere di essere neroazzurri, Milano, Rizzoli, 2002 (in Italian). ISBN 88-17-11764-1
- Manuale dell'uomo domestico, Milano, Rizzoli, 2002 (in Italian). ISBN 88-17-87104-4
- Altri interismi. Un nuovo viaggio nel favoloso labirinto neroazzurro, Milano, Rizzoli, 2003 (in Italian). ISBN 88-17-10736-0
- Manuale dell'imperfetto sportivo, Milano, Rizzoli, 2003 (in Italian). ISBN 88-17-00016-7
- La testa degli italiani, Milano, Rizzoli, 2005 (in Italian). ISBN 88-17-00716-1
- L'italiano. Lezioni semiserie, Milano, Rizzoli, 2007 (in Italian). ISBN 978-88-17-01311-6
- Tripli interismi! Lieto fine di un romanzo neroazzurro, Milano, Rizzoli, 2007 (in Italian). ISBN 978-88-17-01820-3
- Manuale del perfetto interista, Milano, BUR extra, 2007 (in Italian). ISBN 978-88-17-01883-8
- Italians. Il giro del mondo in 80 pizze, Milano, Rizzoli, 2008 (in Italian). ISBN 978-88-17-02600-0
- Manuale dell'uomo normale, Milano, BUR, 2008 (in Italian). ISBN 978-88-17-02637-6
- Manuale del perfetto turista, Milano, BUR extra, 2009 (in Italian). ISBN 978-88-17-03273-5
- Imperfetto manuale di lingue, Milano, BUR extra, 2010 (in Italian). ISBN 978-88-17-04274-1
- Eurointerismi. La gioia di essere neroazzurri, Milano, Rizzoli, 2010 (in Italian). ISBN 978-88-17-04495-0
- La pancia degli italiani. Berlusconi spiegato ai posteri, Milano, Rizzoli, 2010 (in Italian). ISBN 978-88-17-04764-7
- Italiani di domani, Milano, Rizzoli, 2012 (in Italian). ISBN 978-88-17-06373-9
