= Man Holding a Book =

1529 painting by Parmigianino

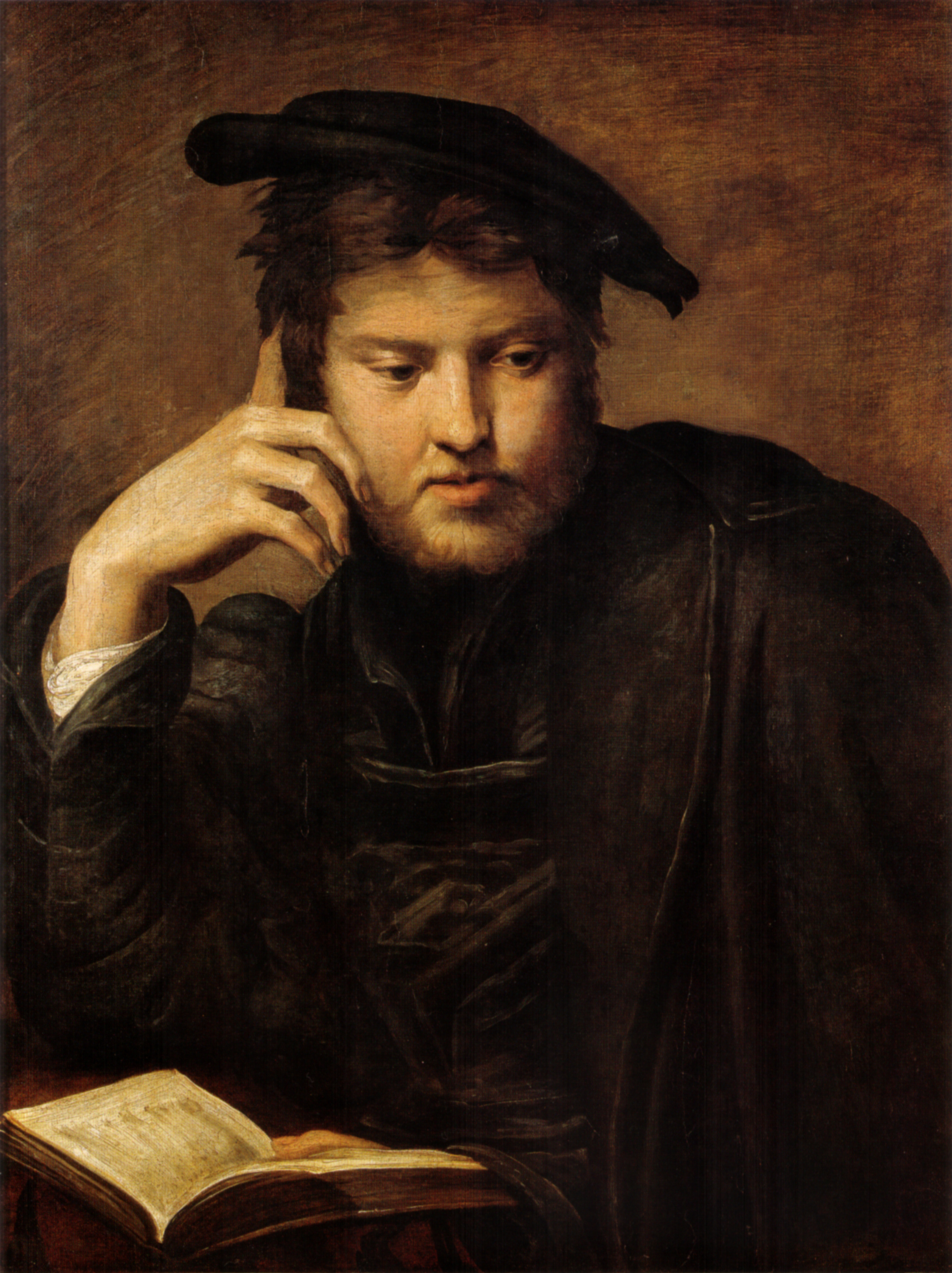
- Artist: Parmigianino
- Year: c. 1529
- Medium: Oil on panel
- Dimensions: 67.5 cm × 53 cm (26.6 in × 21 in)
- Location: Kunsthistorisches Museum, Vienna

Man Holding a Book or Man with a Book is an oil on panel painting by Parmigianino, executed c. 1529, now in the Kunsthistorisches Museum in Vienna.

== Description ==
The painting depicts a young man, in a brown background, dressed in black with a hat of the same color. He is portrayed in half-length, with his elbow resting on a table and his index finger on his temple, while the other hand holds an open book. He is of young age, has brown hair in short locks and a thick, blondish, beard. He has a thoughtful expression, like if he had made a pause in the reading of the book. The style of painting is rapid, made of brushstrokes that leave features not fused together, which is clearly visible on the forehead, on the doublet and on the book. This is a stylistic characteristic typical of his Bolognese period.

== Provenance ==
It was bought at the sale of the collection of Charles I of England in 1651 by Greene and was recorded in Rudolf II's collection in Prague in 1685, at which time it was thought to be a work by Correggio, an artist with a strong influence on Parmigianino early in the latter's career. It arrived in Vienna in 1721, still with that attribution, and it was only in 1857 that Ktaft restored its present attribution, with the agreement of most other later art historians (Frölich-Bum, 1921, Gamba, 1940, Longhi, 1958, Di Giampaolo, 1991, Gould, 1994, Chiusa, 2001). Copertini (1932) and Barocchi (1950) argue it is a copy of an autograph work, whilst Arturo Quintavalle (1948) assigns it to Michelangelo Anselmi or Girolamo da Carpi.
