= Storia d'Italia =

Storia d'Italia (History of Italy) is a monumental work of the journalist and historian Indro Montanelli, written in collaboration with Roberto Gervaso and Mario Cervi from 1965 to 1997. The idea of a series of books about the history of Italy came to Montanelli after a conversation with Dino Buzzati. Montanelli initially proposed the idea to Mondadori, who wasn't interested. Montanelli then spoke to Longanesi, who agreed to publish the prologue, Storia di Roma (History of Rome) in 1957. Following the success of the book, Rizzoli purchased the rights of the work and republished it in 1959. In 1965 Rizzoli, satisfied with the cultural impact of the book and its commercial success, agreed to publish the ambitious Storia d'Italia.

The work is divided into several volumes, each dedicated to an era of Italian history from the fall of the Western Roman Empire (476 AD) until the end of the 20th century. The work has been very successful, selling over a million copies, becoming one of the most popular books of popular history in Italy.

== Structure of the work ==
=== Italy of the Dark Ages – The Middle Ages up to 1000 AD ===
The book talks about the history of Italy in the period of the High Middle Ages. Montanelli used as sources the work of the historic Ferdinand Gregorovius, who deeply admired, while the history of the Popes was inspired by Ludwig von Pastor. At the beginning of work is narrated the decline and fall of the Western Roman Empire and then begin to tell the Italian medieval history.

=== Italy of the Commons – The Middle Ages from 1000 to 1250 ===
The communal age, fundamental historic step with the affirmation of local part of the Empire. The author was inspired by the work of the British historian Anderson.

=== Italy of the golden age – The Middle Ages from 1250 to 1492 ===
The evolution from the late Middle Ages to the Renaissance in Italy.

=== Italy of the Counter-Reformation – 1492–1600 ===
The book – according to many the best of the series – is based on the regret that Italy, after almost three centuries lived as a protagonist, is degraded to the subject of European affairs. Montanelli identifies the source of all vices and authoritarian traits that explain centuries of civil and economic backwardness in the failure to Reform.

He explains his thesis historiographical:

I accepted the thesis of two great masters, Max Weber and Werner Sombart. For theme modern history begins with the Reformation. I walk this insight in reverse: we Italians, not having the Reformation, missed the train of modern civilization.

A judgment evident in the following description: «The Calvinist, grew in the atmosphere of democratic 'congregation' and under the sign of an egalitarian God, rejects hierarchies of Renaissance society... [Calvinist] sees money as a sign of Grace», «this religion labor and savings that initiates, providing a moral foundation, to capitalism in the modern sense of the word».

Then the author saw in the triumph of the Counter-Reformation the watershed that marks the loss of national autonomy, which took place at the peak of Humanism and the Renaissance Italian art and literature, and the rapid economic decline of the United Peninsula; Philip II of Spain, King of the Counter Reformation, especially in his war against the Dutch reformed of Flanders, «didn't understand, couldn't understand that his struggle against heresy was the fight against the modern world... all his efforts and those of the Church were only able to steal this revolution their feud: Spain, Italy and the Latin American continent. What are the consequences for these countries we see it today».

From Girolamo Savonarola to the House of Borgia's rise, the drama of the Christian conscience to the Protestant schism, theologians and heretics, the historical impact of the Reformation to the reaction of the Catholic Council of Trent, the art boom of the Renaissance and its protagonists: Michelangelo Buonarroti, Raphael, Leonardo da Vinci, Niccolò Machiavelli, Francesco Guicciardini, Torquato Tasso, Ludovico Ariosto, Pietro Aretino, Benvenuto Cellini. Montanelli symbolically closes the work, evoking the image of the Giordano Bruno's stake, because «it illuminates a light more relevant the Italian bleak landscape in the Italy of Counter-Reformation: a priest and a gendarme intent to roast a rebel without even the consolation of a cause to which he can give his own sacrifice».

=== Italy of the seventeenth century – 1600–1700 ===
History of a century marked by scientific advances, the rise and the decline of local powers. This book is given much space to foreign facts and scenarios: the Spanish conquests in South America leading the tide of gold in Europe (and that can be seen as the premises of the economic crisis), the Thirty Years' War, a result of the crisis, the dynastic events of the House of Habsburg and the rise of France. Italy is described as a colony of the great powers of this century: it's far from Calvinist capitalism emerging in the regions of Northern Europe; it's immobilized in latifundium and charges noble.

=== Italy of the eighteenth century – 1700–1789 ===
In the background of the European wars of succession, an excursus from baroque to Enlightenment, to the French Revolution.
It's the last book written with Roberto Gervaso: five subsequent books are written by the only Montanelli.

=== Italy Jacobin and Carbonara – 1789–1831 ===
From the French Revolution to the Carbonari movements.

=== Italy of the Risorgimento – 1831–1861 ===
From the conclusion of the Carbonari uprisings until the Unification of Italy.

=== Italy of the Notables – 1861–1900 ===
The book traces the history of Italy from the Unification to the assassination of King Umberto I (July 29, 1900).

=== Italy of Giovanni Giolitti – 1900–1920 ===
The book traces the period from the beginning of the new century to the end of the First World War, dominated by the political figure of Giovanni Giolitti.

=== Italy in Black Shirt – 1919–1925 ===
By riots in 1920 until the establishment of the fascist dictatorship with the Discorso del bivacco of Benito Mussolini.

=== Fascist Italy – 1925–1936 ===
History of Italy during the consolidation of dictatorship and the colonial adventure.
From this book Montanelli is helped by Mario Cervi.

=== Italy of the Axis – 1936–1940 ===
The years marked by the Axis between Rome and Berlin until the declaration of war.

=== Italy of the Defeat – 1940–1943 ===
The war on the side of Germany is traced until the armistice and the defeat of the Italian army.

=== Italy of the civil war – 1943–1946 ===
The book, which calls «Civil War» and not only «Resistance» the period from September 1943 to May 1946 (to emphasize the confusion reigning in Italy), ended with the abdication of Victor Emmanuel III of Italy.

=== Italy of the Republic – 1946–1948 ===
History of Italy from the Constitutional referendum (June 2, 1946) to the Christian Democracy's victory (April 18, 1948) who coerced the Country to the Western bloc and the election of Luigi Einaudi at the President of the Italian Republic (May 11, 1948).

=== Italy of the miracle – 1948–1954 ===
Between the attempt on Palmiro Togliatti that sparked riots in the Country (July 14, 1948) and the death of Alcide De Gasperi (August 19, 1954) who had led Italy in the reconstruction, born the basis for the «economic miracle» just following.

=== Italy of two Giovanni – 1955–1965 ===
Pope John XXIII (Italian: Giovanni XXIII) and Giovanni Gronchi (President of Italy from 1955 to 1962) are the characters who, in different ways, characterize the years of Italian history.

=== Italy of the Years of Lead – 1965–1978 ===
From the years preceding the protests of 1968 in Italy, the long period of terrorism, through the assassination of Aldo Moro until the election of Sandro Pertini as President of the Italian Republic.

In the book's preface Montanelli wrote:

For the Seventies and the early Eighties we were shown to the public execration as the fascists, the coup plotters, in a word, the lepers. And maybe we would still be in the ghetto where they had relegated, if the facts had not come to give us reason. Undressing of this past and talk as if there had attended was for Cervi and for me, the biggest effort. We hope to be able: to the extent, of course, of quell'angle from which even more objective and impartial historian can not ignore. For us, the years from the Piazza Fontana bombing to Aldo Moro's murder are not «formidable» as are paint by some commentators and memoirs of left to justify their past to support the terrorism. For us those «formidable» years were those of abuse of a minority drunk of fashions and models of import (Marcuse, Mao, Che Guevara) on a majority succubus also because without a voice that represented it. We were this voice. And we can not ignore it even if we have done everything to forget it. In our opinion, the report of those «formidable» years is totally negative. They do not are left behind that grief, galleys, and the so-called «culture of suspicion» that followed to pollute our public life, constantly shaken by scandals more or less pretentious that in those «formidable» years have their origin and root.

=== Italy of the Years of Mud – 1978–1993 ===
Since the election of Pope John Paul II through the P2 scandal, the end of terrorism period, the first socialist government led by Bettino Craxi, the Lega Nord's birth to Tangentopoli and the collapse of the political system born after the War.

=== Italy of Berlusconi – 1993–1995 ===
The aftermath of the corruption and the new election law favors the political rise of Silvio Berlusconi, who won the 1994 elections and leads a government whose brief life will be particularly troubled.

=== Italy of The Olive – 1995–1997 ===
From the Autumn 1995 until the first crisis of Prodi Cabinet (October 1997). It's the last book of the series. History and news are welded, bolted by this sad account of Montanelli in the Postscript:

I stopped to believe in the usefulness of a history written outside of all the circuits of politics and traditional culture. In fact, to be honest to the end, I stopped to believe in the Italy... There will not be blood: Italy is allergic to the drama, and it is no longer willing to kill, let alone to die. Gently, in a state of anesthesia, we will return to be the «land of the dead, inhabited by a human dust», which Montaigne had described three centuries ago. Or maybe not, we will remain what we are: a conglomerate committed to discuss, with big words, large reforms covering small games of power and interest. Italy is over. Or perhaps, born of plebiscites-joke as those of 1860-'61, it has never existed in the imagination of a few dreamers, who have had the misfortune to belong. For me it is no longer the Homeland. It is only the regret of a Homeland.

== Italy of the Twentieth Century and Italy of the Millennium ==
Montanelli and Cervi published other two books as well as summarize the facts described in their books earlier adjourned for a couple of years the work, namely Italy of the Twentieth Century and Italy of the Millennium. The first book describes the whole Italian political situation from 1900 to 1998, with a short article that describes the fall of Prodi Cabinet and the birth of the D'Alema's government. The second book summarizes the facts of Italian history from 1000 until the end of 2000. Italian political situation is updated with the fall of D'Alema's government, the birth of Amato II Cabinet and forecasts for the upcoming 2001 Italian general election.

== Bibliography ==
- Montanelli, Indro; Roberto Gervaso (1965). L'Italia dei secoli bui. Il Medio Evo sino al Mille. Milan, Lombardy, Italy: Rizzoli Editore.
- Montanelli, Indro; Roberto Gervaso (1966). L'Italia dei Comuni. Il Medio Evo dal 1000 al 1250. Milan, Lombardy, Italy: Rizzoli Editore.
- Montanelli, Indro; Roberto Gervaso (1967). L'Italia dei secoli d'oro. Il Medio Evo dal 1250 al 1492. Milan, Lombardy, Italy: Rizzoli Editore.
- Montanelli, Indro; Roberto Gervaso (1968). L'Italia della Controriforma (1492-1600). Milan, Lombardy, Italy: Rizzoli Editore.
- Montanelli, Indro; Roberto Gervaso (1969). L'Italia del Seicento (1600-1700). Milan, Lombardy, Italy: Rizzoli Editore.
- Montanelli, Indro; Roberto Gervaso (1970). L'Italia del Settecento (1700-1789). Milan, Lombardy, Italy: Rizzoli Editore.
- Montanelli, Indro (1971). L'Italia giacobina e carbonara (1789-1831). Milan, Lombardy, Italy: Rizzoli Editore.
- Montanelli, Indro (1972). L'Italia del Risorgimento (1831-1861). Milan, Lombardy, Italy: Rizzoli Editore.
- Montanelli, Indro (1973). L'Italia dei Notabili (1861-1900). Milan, Lombardy, Italy: Rizzoli Editore.
- Montanelli, Indro (1974). L'Italia di Giolitti (1900-1920). Milan, Lombardy, Italy: Rizzoli Editore.
- Montanelli, Indro (1976). L'Italia in camicia nera (1919-3 gennaio 1925). Milan, Lombardy, Italy: Rizzoli Editore.
- Montanelli, Indro; Mario Cervi (1979). L'Italia littoria (1925-1936). Milan, Lombardy, Italy: Rizzoli Editore.
- Montanelli, Indro; Mario Cervi (1980). L'Italia dell'Asse (1936-10 giugno 1940). Milan, Lombardy, Italy: Rizzoli Editore.
- Montanelli, Indro; Mario Cervi (1982). L'Italia della disfatta (10 giugno 1940-8 settembre 1943). Milan, Lombardy, Italy: Rizzoli Editore.
- Montanelli, Indro; Mario Cervi (1983). L'Italia della guerra civile (8 settembre 1943-9 maggio 1946). Milan, Lombardy, Italy: Rizzoli Editore.
- Montanelli, Indro; Mario Cervi (1985). L'Italia della Repubblica (2 giugno 1946-18 aprile 1948). Milan, Lombardy, Italy: Rizzoli Editore.
- Montanelli, Indro; Mario Cervi (1987). L'Italia del miracolo (14 luglio 1948-19 agosto 1954). Milan, Lombardy, Italy: Rizzoli Editore.
- Montanelli, Indro; Mario Cervi (1989). L'Italia dei due Giovanni (1955-1965). Milan, Lombardy, Italy: Rizzoli Editore.
- Montanelli, Indro; Mario Cervi (1991). L'Italia degli anni di piombo (1965-1978). Milan, Lombardy, Italy: Rizzoli Editore.
- Montanelli, Indro; Mario Cervi (1993). L'Italia degli anni di fango (1978-1993). Milan, Lombardy, Italy: Rizzoli Editore.
- Montanelli, Indro; Mario Cervi (1995). L'Italia di Berlusconi (1993-1995). Milan, Lombardy, Italy: Rizzoli Editore.
- Montanelli, Indro; Mario Cervi (1997). L'Italia dell'Ulivo (1995-1997). Milan, Lombardy, Italy: Rizzoli Editore.
- Montanelli, Indro; Mario Cervi (1998). L'Italia del Novecento. Milan, Lombardy, Italy: Rizzoli Editore.
- Montanelli, Indro; Mario Cervi (2000). L'Italia del Millennio. Sommario di dieci secoli di storia. Milan, Lombardy, Italy: Rizzoli Editore.
