= Boy with a Finger in His Mouth =

Painting by Parmigianino

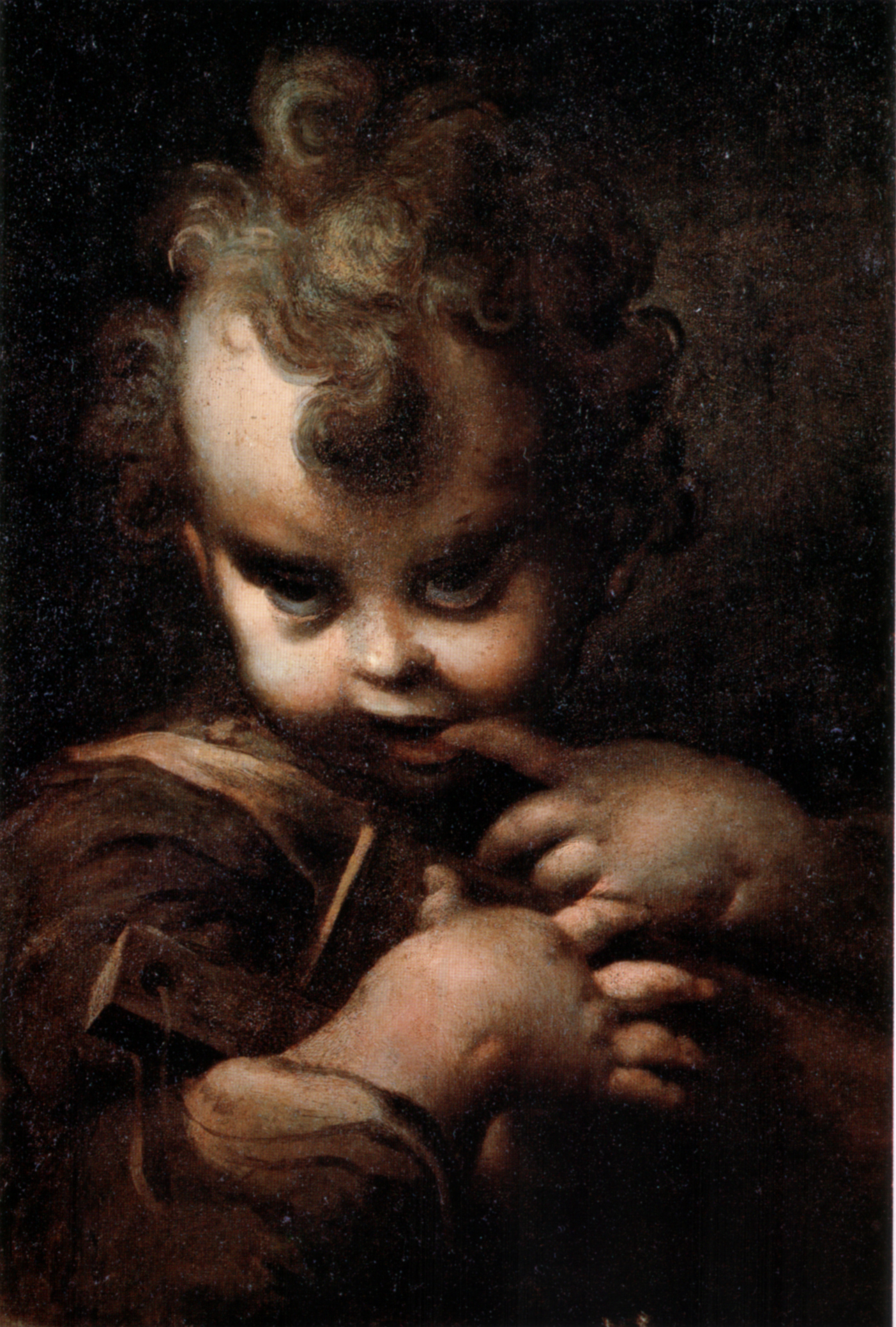
Boy with a Finger in His Mouth (c. 1530) by Parmigianino

Boy with a Finger in His Mouth is a c.1530 oil on panel painting by Parmigianino, now in a private collection. In his right hand he holds a tablet with his ABC. Arturo Quintavalle argued it was a copy after Parmigianino, but most other art historians argue it to be an autograph work.

It is first recorded in a 1612 inventory of Barbara Sanseverino's goods described as "[a painting] by Parmigianino showing a 'putta' with a finger in its mouth and a tola in brass". It was later exhibited at the Palazzo del Giardino in Parma and was then mentioned in a 1680 inventory as "a head of a "puttino" with knotted hair holding a finger of its left hand in its mouth and with a canvas with an alphabet in its right hand, by Parmigianino" and in a 1785 inventory as a "sketch of a boy joking". The work then passed to an art dealer and was published in 1930 by Frölich-Bum, at which time it was in the Frey collection in Paris. Freedberg published it again in 1950, when it was in the Gouldstikker Gallery in Amsterdam.
