= Mario Cervi =

Italian essayist and journalist

- Born: 25 March 1921; Crema, Kingdom of Italy
- Died: 17 November 2015 (aged 94); Milan, Italy
- Occupation: Writer

Mario Cervi (25 March 1921 – 17 November 2015) was an Italian essayist and journalist.

Born in Crema, Lombardy, Cervi started his career as a journalist in 1945 collaborating with the newspaper Corriere della Sera as a foreign reporter. In 1965 he debuted as an essayist with Storia della guerra di Grecia ("History of the War of Greece"), with references to his experience as an infantry officer in Greece during the Second World War. After about thirty years of collaboration, in 1974 he left the Corriere della Sera to co-found, with Indro Montanelli, the newspaper il Giornale, in which he was columnist and then also deputy editor.

With Montanelli, Cervi co-wrote 13 volumes of Storia d'Italia and the historical essay Milano ventesimo secolo. After following Montanelli in the short-lived newspaper La Voce in 1994, Cervi collaborated with the newspaper La Nazione and in 1997 he became editor in chief of il Giornale, succeeding to Vittorio Feltri. He left the direction of the newspaper in 2001, still continuing to collaborate as a columnist. He also continued his activity as an essayist, and his last work was the book Sprecopoli, he co-wrote with Nicola Porro in 2007.

Media offices
Preceded by Vittorio Feltri	Editor in chief of Il Giornale; 1997–2001	Succeeded by Maurizio Belpietro
