= Stolpersteine in Croatia =

Memorial installation

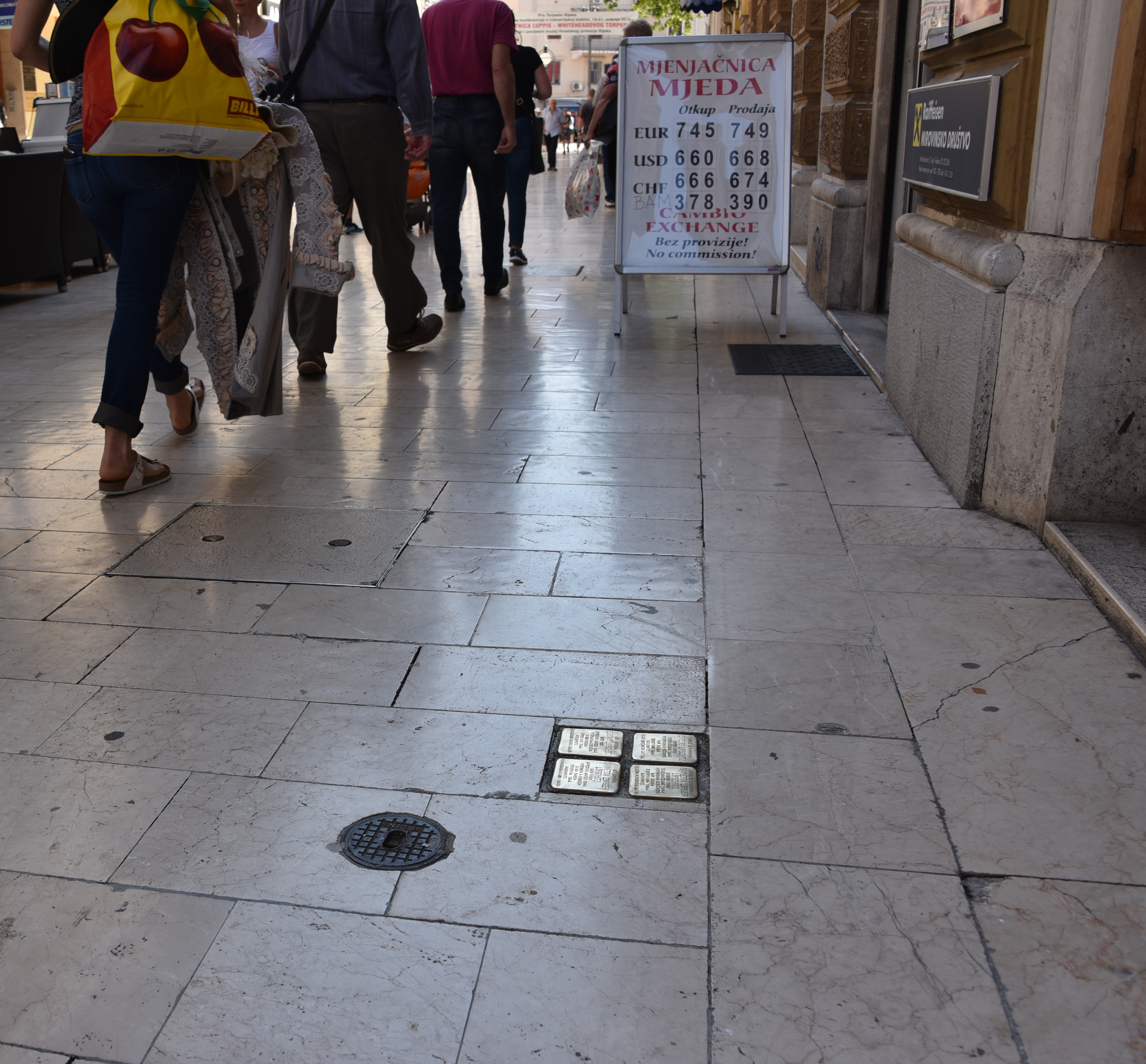
Stolpersteine for Eugenio and Giannetta Lipschitz in Rijeka

This article lists the Stolpersteine in the Republic of Croatia. Stolpersteine is the German name for stumbling blocks collocated all over Europe by German artist Gunter Demnig. They remember the fate of the Nazi victims being murdered, deported, exiled or driven to suicide.

Generally, the stumbling blocks are posed in front of the building where the victims had their last self-chosen residence. Until now in Croatia there has been only one collocation of Stolpersteine—in 2013 in the Adriatic town Rijeka (Croatian pronunciation: [rijěːka], in Italian: Fiume). From 1466, this town was under Habsburg rule for four and half centuries, at last with two-thirds of its inhabitants being of Italian descent. Thereafter, Rijeka was independent for some years. From 1924 to the end of WW2, the city belonged to Italy. The name of the Stolpersteine in Croatian is Kamen spoticanja, and in Italian: pietre d'inciampo.

== Rijeka ==
Stone	Inscription	Location	Life and death
	HERE LIVED; EUGENIO LIPSCHITZ; BORN 1883; ARRESTED MARCH 1944; INTERNED IN RISIERA; DI SAN SABBA; DEPORTED 1944; AUSCHWITZ; MURDERED AT AN UNKNOWN DATE	Ante Starčevića 5; 45°19′33″N 14°26′41″E	Jeremus Eugenio Lipschitz was born on 5 May 1883 in the Western Hungarian city of Sümeg. His family moved to Fiume/Rijeka in 1894. He established himself as a retailer of gadgets and jewelry and married Zseni Zipszer, also called Giannetta. The couple had three children, the sons Arturo (1914–1980) and Efraim (born 1919) and the daughter Magda (also Maddalena), who later-on was married to Enrico Heimler and took his name. Both sons were able to emigrate to Palestine in time. His daughter Magda, together with her husband, her mother-in-law and her sister-in-law, escaped to Central Italy in September 1943, and thereafter to Switzerland where she could survive the Holocaust. Jeremus Eugenio Lipschitz was interned by the Mussolini regime 28 July – 22 December 1940 in the Campagna internment camp. After his release he was not allowed to return to Fiume for a certain period. He and his wife were arrested in Fiume by German forces in March 1944, first deported to Risiera di San Sabba, a German concentration camp in Trieste, later to Auschwitz Birkenau concentration camp. There, both were murdered at an unknown time. His sister Giuseppina and her husband Adolfo Simkovits were also murdered in Auschwitz. Lipschitz's report on the internment in Campagna was translated by his daughter from Hungarian to Italian and published in 2001 in book form. His report was designated by the Corriere del Mezzogiorno as a particularly relevant historical document. (Note: In a review of the book Gli ebrei sotto la persecuzione in Italia by Avagliano/Palmieri, the Italian daily Corriere del Mezzogiorno praised the Lipschitz diary and its "exact description of the internment″.) Excerpts appeared in two anthologies in 2011 and 2015.
	HERE LIVED; GIANNETTA ZIPSZER; LIPSCHITZ; BORN 1893; ARRESTED MARCH 1944; INTERNED IN RISIERA; DI SAN SABBA; DEPORTED 1944; AUSCHWITZ; MURDERED AT AN UNKNOWN DATE	Ante Starčevića 5; 45°19′33″N 14°26′41″E	Giannetta Zipszer Lipschitz, also Zseni, was born on 18 June 1893 in Mád in Northeastern Hungary. Her parents were shop assistant Albert Zipszer (born 1843) and the housewife Rozaliá Altmann (born 1848). She had at least one brother, Herman, born 1868 in Mad. She lived in Fiume/Rijeka from 1914, was married to Jeremus Eugenio Lipschitz and worked as a housewife. The couple had at least three children who were all born in Fiume and who could survive the German occupation and the Holocaust: Arturo, Magda and Efraim. Together with her husband, she was arrested in Fiume in March 1944, deported to Risiera di San Sabba, and later to Auschwitz Birkenau concentration camp, where she was murdered by the Nazi regime at an unknown time, as was her husband.

== Dates of collocations ==
The collocation in Rijeka took place on 21 May 2013. For both victims two Stolpersteine were posed, one in Croatian and one in Italian. The planned collocation of a Stolperstein for Branko Lustig in Osijek on 22 May 2013 has probably not taken place.

== See also ==
- The Holocaust in the Independent State of Croatia
- List of places with Stolpersteine
