= Corriere della Sera =

Italian daily newspaper

- La libertà delle idee ("The freedom of ideas")

- Front page on 15 July 2009
- Type: Daily newspaper
- Format: Berliner
- Owner: RCS MediaGroup
- Founder: Eugenio Torelli Viollier
- Founded: 5 March 1876; 150 years ago
- Political alignment: Liberalism; Centrism; Formerly: Fascism (1925–1945); Conservatism; Anti-communism
- Language: Italian
- Headquarters: Milan, Italy
- Country: Italy
- Circulation: 206,874 (print, 2018); 170,000 (digital, 2019)
- Sister newspapers: La Gazzetta dello Sport
- ISSN: 1120-4982
- Website: www.corriere.it

Il Corriere della Sera (Italian: [korˈrjɛːre della ˈseːra]; lit. 'Evening Courier') is an Italian daily newspaper published in Milan with an average circulation of 246,278 copies in May 2023. First published on 5 March 1876, Corriere della Sera is one of Italy's oldest newspapers and is Italy's most read newspaper. Its masthead has remained unchanged since its first edition in 1876. It reached a circulation of over 1 million under editor and co-owner Luigi Albertini between 1900 and 1925. He was a strong opponent of socialism, clericalism, and Giovanni Giolitti, who was willing to compromise with those forces during his time as prime minister of Italy. Albertini's opposition to the Italian fascist regime forced the other co-owners to oust him in 1925.

A representative of the moderate bourgeoisie, Corriere della Sera has always been generally considered centre-right-leaning, hosting in its columns liberal and democratic Catholic views. In the 21st century, its main competitors are Rome's la Repubblica and Turin's La Stampa. Until the late 1970s and early 1980s, when the country underwent a nationalization process, Corriere della Sera and La Stampa were not real national daily newspapers, as their geographical area of circulation was mostly limited to Lombardy for Corriere della Sera and Piedmont for La Stampa; thus, both papers shared a readership that was linked to its place of residence and its social class, mostly from the industrialist class and financial circles. Corriere della Sera is considered the Italian national newspaper of record. Corriere della Sera is the "major daily" and one of the main national newspapers in Italy, alongside la Repubblica, La Stampa, Il Sole 24 Ore, and Il Messaggero.

== History and profile ==
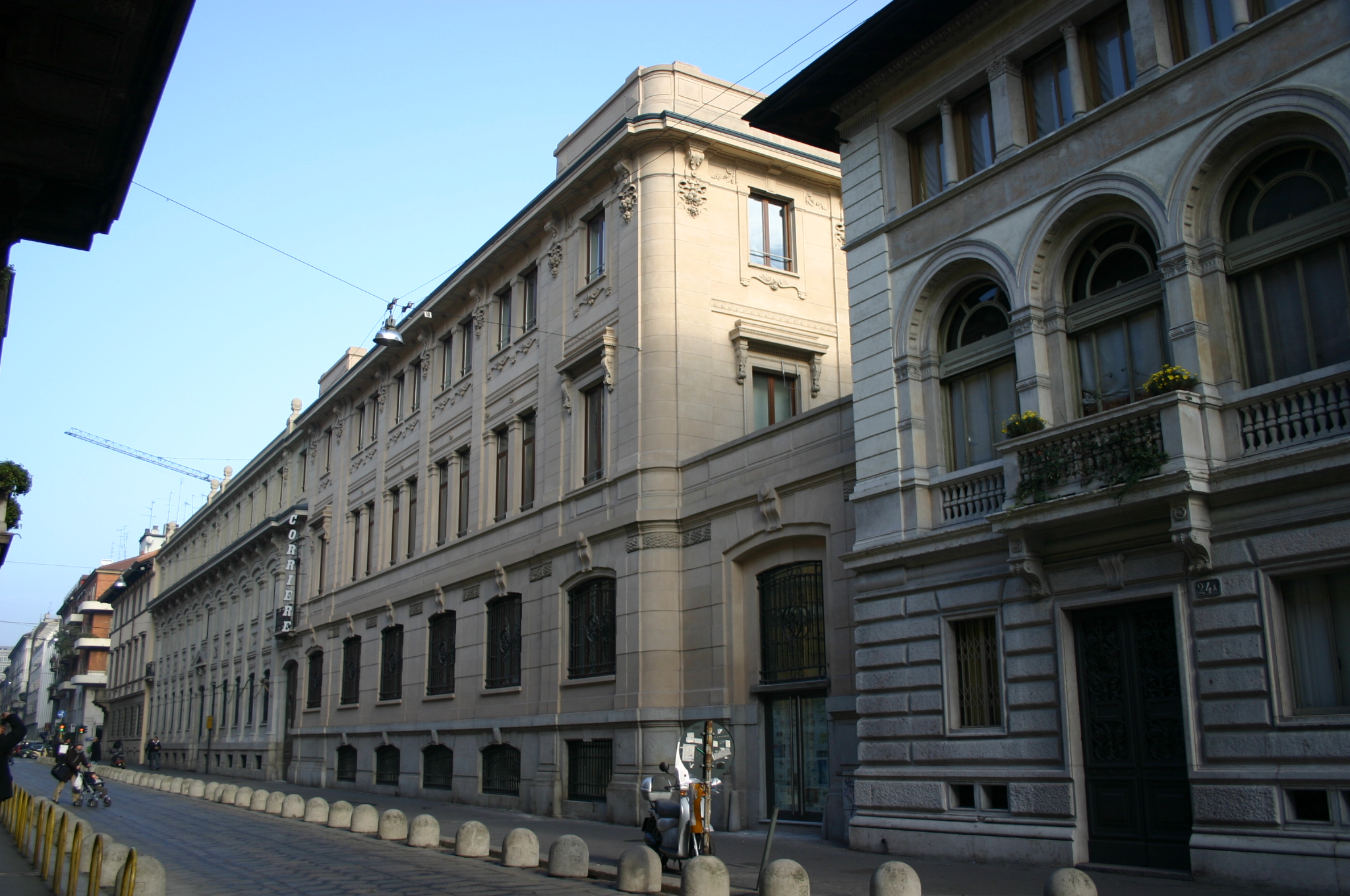
The paper headquarters in Milan

Corriere della Sera was first published on Sunday, 5 March 1876, by Eugenio Torelli Viollier. In 1899, the paper began to offer a weekly illustrated supplement, La Domenica del Corriere ("Sunday of the Courier"). In the 1910s and 1920s, under the direction of Luigi Albertini, Corriere della Sera became the most widely read newspaper in Italy, maintaining its importance and influence into the present century. It was Corriere della Sera that introduced comics in Italy in 1908 through a supplement for children, namely Corriere dei Piccoli ("Courier of the Little Ones").

The newspaper's headquarters has been in the same buildings since the beginning of the 20th century, and therefore it is popularly known as "the Via Solferino newspaper", after the street where it is still located. As the name indicates, it was originally an evening paper. During the Fascist regime in Italy, Corriere della Sera funded the Mussolini Prize, which was awarded to the writers Ada Negri and Emilio Cecchi, among the others. Mario Borsa, a militant anti-fascist, was appointed the editor-in-chief of Corriere della Sera in May 1945; the next year, the paper was relaunched as Il Nuovo Corriere della Sera, a name that it kept until 1959, to distance itself from its support of Fascism. Borsa was fired because of his political leanings in August 1946 and was replaced by Guglielmo Emanuel, a right-wing journalist. Emanuel served in the post until 1952.

In the 1950s, Corriere della Sera was the organ of the conservative establishment in Italy and was strongly anti-communist and pro-NATO. The paper was functional in shaping the views of the Italian upper and middle classes during this period. The owners of the Corriere della Sera, the Crespi family, sold a share to the RCS MediaGroup in the 1960s and was listed in the Italian stock exchange. Its main shareholders were Mediobanca, the Fiat group, and some of the biggest industrial and financial groups in Italy. In 1974, the RCS Media moved on to control the majority of the paper.

=== The 1980s and 1990s ===
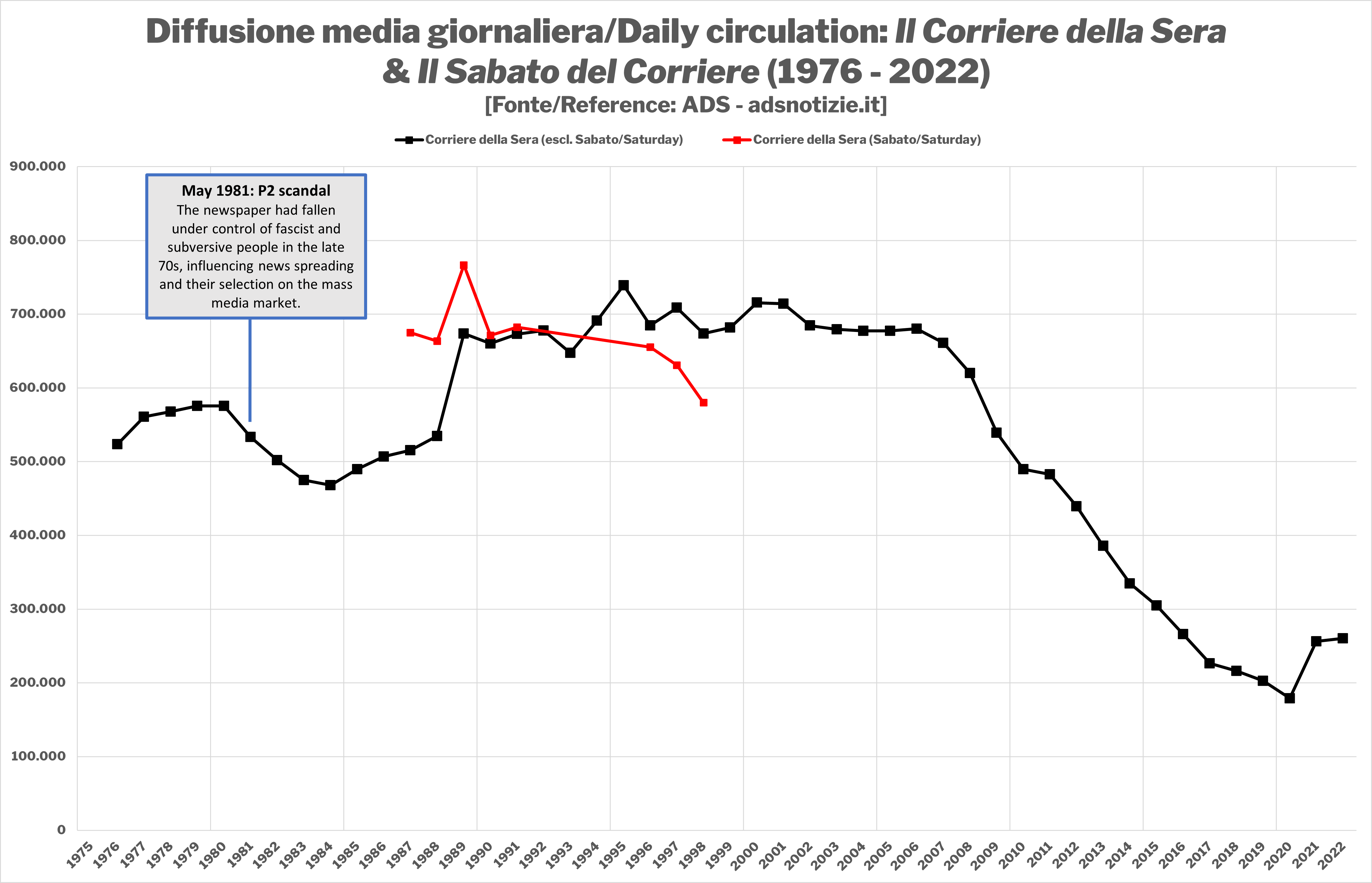
The newspaper was heavily affected by the P2 scandal started in 1981; it would regain its lost readers only in 1989.

During the early 1980s, Alberto Cavallari was the editor-in-chief of the paper. In 1981, the newspaper was laterally involved in the Propaganda Due scandal when it was discovered that the secret Freemason lodge had the newspaper's editor Franco Di Bella and the former owner Angelo Rizzoli on its member lists. In September 1987, the paper launched the weekly magazine supplement Sette, which is the first in its category in Italy. From 1987 to 1992, the editor-in-chief of Corriere della Sera was Ugo Stille.

The 1988 circulation of Corriere della Sera was 715,000 copies, making it the second most read newspaper in Italy. The paper started its Saturday supplement, IO Donna, in 1996. In 1997, Corriere della Sera was the best-selling Italian newspaper with a circulation of 687,000 copies.

=== The 21st century ===
Corriere della Sera had a circulation of 715,000 copies in 2001. In 2002, it fell to 681,000 copies. In 2003, its then editor Ferruccio de Bortoli resigned from the post. The journalists and opposition politicians stated that the resignation was due to the paper's criticism of Silvio Berlusconi.

In 2004, Corriere della Sera launched an online English section focusing on Italian current affairs and culture. That same year, it was the best-selling newspaper in Italy with a circulation of 677,542 copies. In May 2007, the paper's website was listed 15th among the top 30 brands of the month in Italy, with over 4 million unique visitors, and behind only la Repubblica among daily newspapers; during the same month, the paper had sold about 594,000 copies compared to the circa 566,000 copies of la Repubblica. Its circulation in December 2007 was 662,253 copies; excluding digital copies, its circulation in December 2013 was 99,145 copies. By 2015, the paper had the country's highest circulation at about 308,000 copies. One of the most visited Italian-language news websites, attracting over 2.4 million readers every day in July 2019, the online version of the paper was the thirteenth most visited website in the country in 2011.

In 2004, Angelo Agostini categorized Corriere della Sera as an institution daily (quotidiano-istituzione), alongside La Stampa, in contrast to the agenda daily (quotidiano-agenda) like la Repubblica, and the activist daily (quotidiano-attivista) like Il Foglio, Libero, and l'Unità. On 24 September 2014, Corriere della Sera changed its broadsheet format to the Berliner format. On 7 March 2020, during the COVID-19 pandemic in Italy, Corriere della Sera leaked a draft decree to put into lockdown several northern provinces particularly affected by the virus. The leaked news sparked a panic exodus to the south, and the threat of further contagion led to COVID-19 lockdowns in Italy.

== Content and sections ==
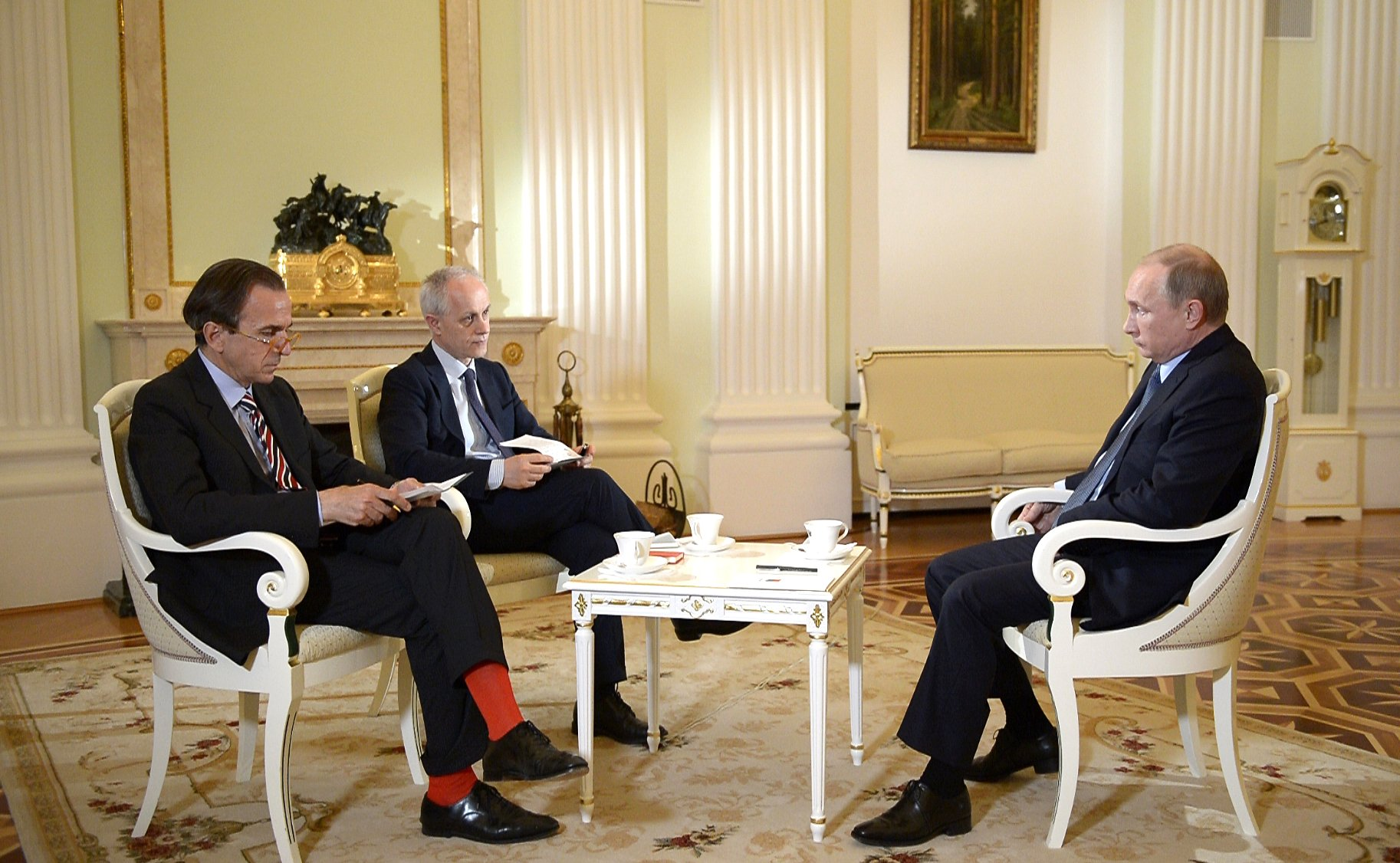
Corriere della Sera journalists interviewing Russian President Vladimir Putin in June 2015

Terza pagina ("Third Page"), a one page-survey dedicated to culture, used to feature the main article "Elzeviro" (named after the House of Elzevir font originally used), which over the years published contributions from all the editors, as well as major novelists, poets, and journalists. On Monday, Corriere della Sera is published alongside L'Economia ("The Economy"), a weekly finance and business magazine. On Thursday, it is published with Sette ("Seven"), a current events magazine. On Sunday, it is published along with la Lettura ("The Reading"), a weekly literary supplement.

== Contributors past and present ==
The Italian novelist Dino Buzzati was a journalist at the Corriere della Sera. Other notable contributors include Adolfo Battaglia, Eugenio Montale, Curzio Malaparte, Gabriele D'Annunzio, Enzo Bettiza, Italo Calvino, Alberto Moravia, Amos Oz, Pier Paolo Pasolini, Guido Piovene, Giovanni Spadolini, Oriana Fallaci, Alessandra Farkas, Lando Ferretti, Brunella Gasperini, Enzo Biagi, Indro Montanelli, Giovanni Sartori, Paolo Brera, Francesco Alberoni, Tracy Chevalier, Goffredo Parise, Sergio Romano, Sandro Paternostro, Arturo Quintavalle, Roberto Gervaso, Alan Friedman, Tommaso Landolfi, Alberto Ronchey, Maria Grazia Cutuli, Camilla Cederna, Marida Lombardo Pijola, and Paolo Mieli.

Editors

- Adolfo Rossi (co-director and editor-in-chief, 1895–1898)
- Luciano Fontana (editor-in-chief)
- Barbara Stefanelli (vice editor-in-chief)
- Massimo Gramellini (deputy editor ad personam)
- Federico Fubini (deputy editor ad personam)
- Daniele Manca (deputy editor)
- Venanzio Postiglione (deputy editor)
- Giampaolo Tucci (deputy editor)

Columnist and journalists

- Alberto Alesina (columnist)
- Pierluigi Battista (journalist)
- Giovanni Bianconi (journalist)
- Francesca Bonazzoli (journalist)
- Isabella Bossi Fedrigotti (journalist)
- Ian Bremmer (columnist)
- Goffredo Buccini (journalist)
- Sabino Cassese (columnist)
- Aldo Cazzullo (journalist)
- Benedetta Cosmi (corsivista)
- Lorenzo Cremonesi (journalist)
- Ferruccio de Bortoli (columnist, former editor-in-chief)
- Dario Di Vico (journalist)
- Michele Farina (journalist)
- Luigi Ferrarella (journalist)
- Antonio Ferrari (journalist)
- Massimo Franco (journalist)
- Davide Frattini (Jerusalem correspondent)
- Milena Gabanelli (journalist)
- Massimo Gaggi (New York correspondent)
- Ernesto Galli della Loggia (columnist)
- Mario Gerevini (journalist)
- Francesco Giavazzi (columnist)
- Aldo Grasso (columnist)
- Marco Imarisio (journalist)
- Luigi Ippolito (London correspondent)
- Paolo Lepri (journalist)
- Claudio Magris (columnist)
- Dacia Maraini (columnist)
- Viviana Mazza (journalist)
- Paolo Mereghetti (columnist)
- Paolo Mieli (columnist, former editor-in-chief)
- Stefano Montefiori (Paris correspondent)
- Guido Olimpio (journalist)
- Angelo Panebianco (columnist)
- Mario Pappagallo (columnist)
- Magda Poli (journalist)
- Antonio Polito (columnist)
- Maurizio Porro (journalist)
- Sergio Romano (columnist)
- Arianna Ravelli (journalist)
- Nicola Saldutti (journalist)
- Guido Santevecchi (Beijing correspondent)
- Giuseppe Sarcina (Washington correspondent)
- Fiorenza Sarzanini (journalist)
- Beppe Severgnini (journalist)
- Lina Sotis (columnist)
- Gian Antonio Stella (journalist)
- Danilo Taino (journalist)
- Paolo Valentino (Berlin correspondent)
- Chiara Vanzetto (journalist)
- Franco Venturini (columnist)
- Francesco Verderami (journalist)
- Vincenzo Buonassisi (journalist)

== Supplements ==
- L'Economia (on Monday)
- Buone Notizie (on Tuesday)
- ViviMilano (on Wednesday, only in the province of Milan)
- Sette (on Thursday)
- Liberi Tutti (on Friday)
- IO Donna (on Saturday)
- La Lettura (on Sunday)
- Corriere della Sera Style (monthly)
- Corriere Innovazione (monthly)

== Local editions ==
- Corriere della Sera Brescia (in the province of Brescia)
- Corriere della Sera Bergamo (in the province of Bergamo)
- Corriere della Sera Milano (in the province of Milan)
- Corriere della Sera Roma (in the province of Rome)
- Corriere della Sera Torino (in the province of Turin)
- Corriere di Verona (in the province of Verona)
- Corriere del Veneto (in Veneto)
- Corriere del Trentino (in Trentino)
- Corriere dell'Alto Adige (in South Tyrol)
- Corriere di Bologna (in the province of Bologna)
- Corriere Fiorentino (in Tuscany)
- Corriere del Mezzogiorno (in Apulia, Campania, and Basilicata)

== See also ==
- List of newspapers in Italy
- Mass media in Italy
- List of non-English-language newspapers with English-language subsections
