= Bley =

Bley is a surname. Notable people with the surname include:

- João Punaro Bley (1900–1983), Brazilian military and public administrator
- Paul Bley (1932–2016), contributor to the free jazz movement of the 1960s
- Carla Bley (1936–2023), American jazz composer, pianist, organist and band leader

== See also ==
- Blei
- Blay (surname)
