= Paolo Mieli =

Italian journalist (born 1949)

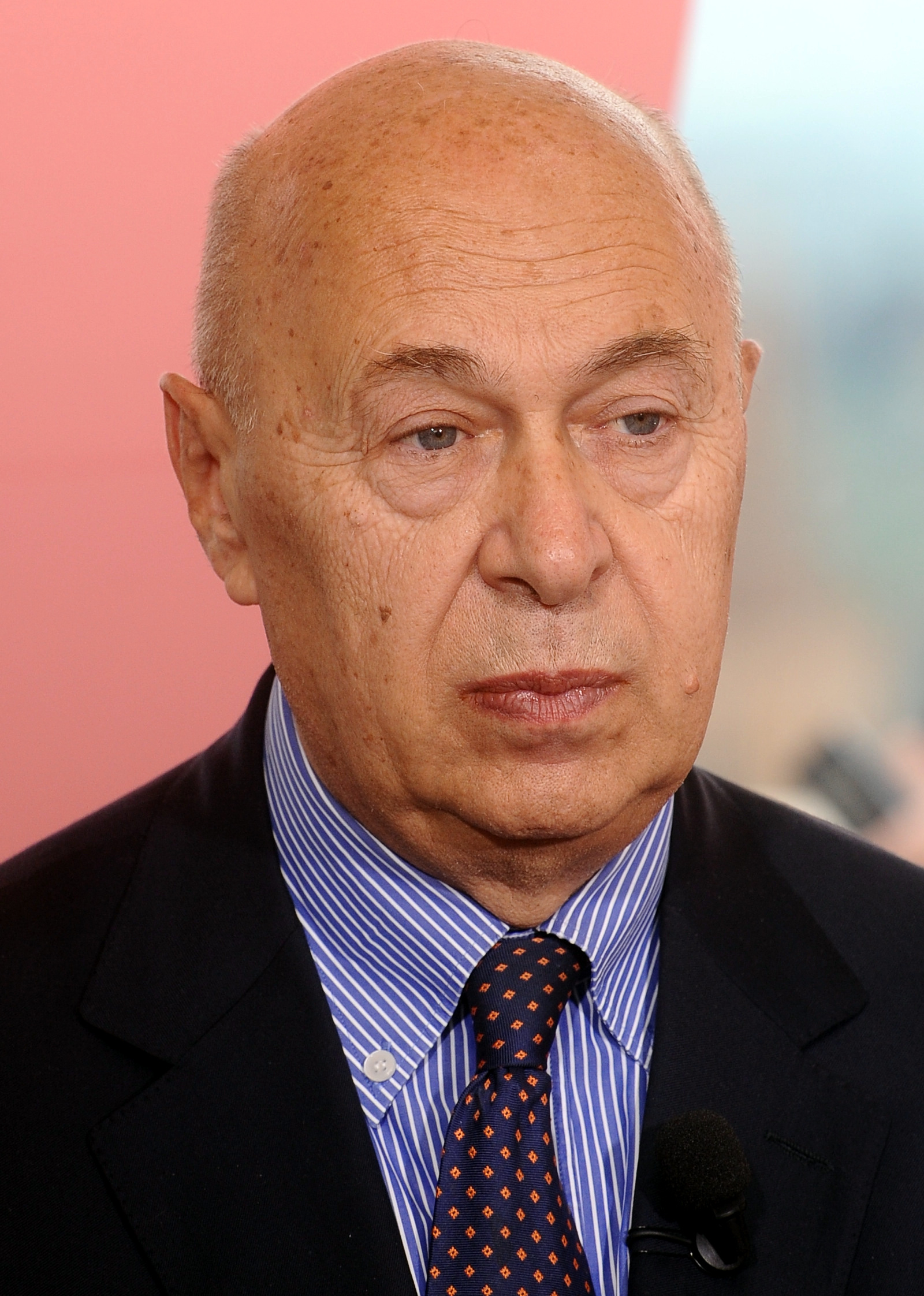
- Mieli in 2015
- Born: 25 February 1949 (age 77); Milan, Italy
- Occupations: Journalist, writer
- Height: 1.78 m (5 ft 10 in)
- Spouse(s): Francesca Socrate; Federica Alatri; Barbara Parodi Delfino
- Children: 3, including Lorenzo

Paolo Mieli (born 25 February 1949) is an Italian journalist who has been editor of Italy's leading newspaper, Corriere della Sera. Born in Milan, Mieli debuted as journalist at 18 for L'Espresso, where he remained for some 20 years. As a member of Potere Operaio, he initially adhered to far-left positions. Later, he took a more moderate stance under the influence and tutelage of his teachers Rosario Romeo and Renzo De Felice. In 1971, he signed the open letter to L'Espresso on the Pinelli case against the police officer Luigi Calabresi.

From the 1980s Mieli worked for the most important Italian newspapers. After one year and a half at La Repubblica, he was hired by La Stampa in 1987. He became director in 1990. Two years later, he moved to Il Corriere della Sera during the Tangentopoli bribe scandal. In May 1997, he was replaced by Ferruccio De Bortoli, assuming the position of editor-in-chief of RCS MediaGroup, publisher of Corriere della Sera. He continued his collaboration for that newspaper and returned as its director on 24 December 2004.

Mieli served as a member of RAI TV, Italy's state network, but turned down the opportunity to be Chair amid a 2003 controversy. As of September 2020, he is a member of the Italian Aspen Institute. On 8 and 9 April 2022, he took part as a speaker in the conference entitled "Science and Knowledge" and organized by the Grand Orient of Italy at the Palacongressi in Rimini.

== Relationships with Freemasonry ==
On 24 November 2017, he gave a lectio magistralis at the conference entitled The Night of History and organised in Rome by the Grand Lodge of Italy to mark the 300th anniversary of the founding of modern Freemasonry.

From 6 to 9 April 2018, he was one of the speakers of the international meeting organized by the Grand Orient of Italy in Rimini. On 9 April 2018, GOI deleted the Italian word razza (which stands for race) from its statutes, following a speech of Paolo Mieli, who also suggested removing it from the Italian Constitution.

On 26 December 2017, he published in the Corriere della Sera an article entitled La Chiesa e lo spettro massonico. Troppo spesso sopravvalutato (The Church and the Masonic spectre. Too often overestimated), which was "an extensive report on the Masonic world, emphasising its revolutionary spirit and stigmatising all the prejudices and 'exaggerations' that all too often surround it, almost always caused - it is argued - by historical and philosophical ignorance."
