= Grazia =

Weekly Italian women's magazine

- Cover page dated January 2009
- Editor: Silvia Grilli
- Categories: Women's magazine
- Frequency: Weekly
- First issue: 1 October 1938; 88 years ago
- Company: Arnoldo Mondadori Editore (1938–2022); Reworld Media (2023–present)
- Country: Italy
- Based in: Milan
- Language: Italian
- Website: graziamagazine.com
- ISSN: 1120-5113

Grazia (Note: Italian: [ˈɡrattsja]; Italian for 'Grace') (stylized as GRAZIA) is a weekly women's magazine that originated in Italy. It has international editions printed in 28 countries. (Note: Attributed to multiple references:)

== History and profile ==
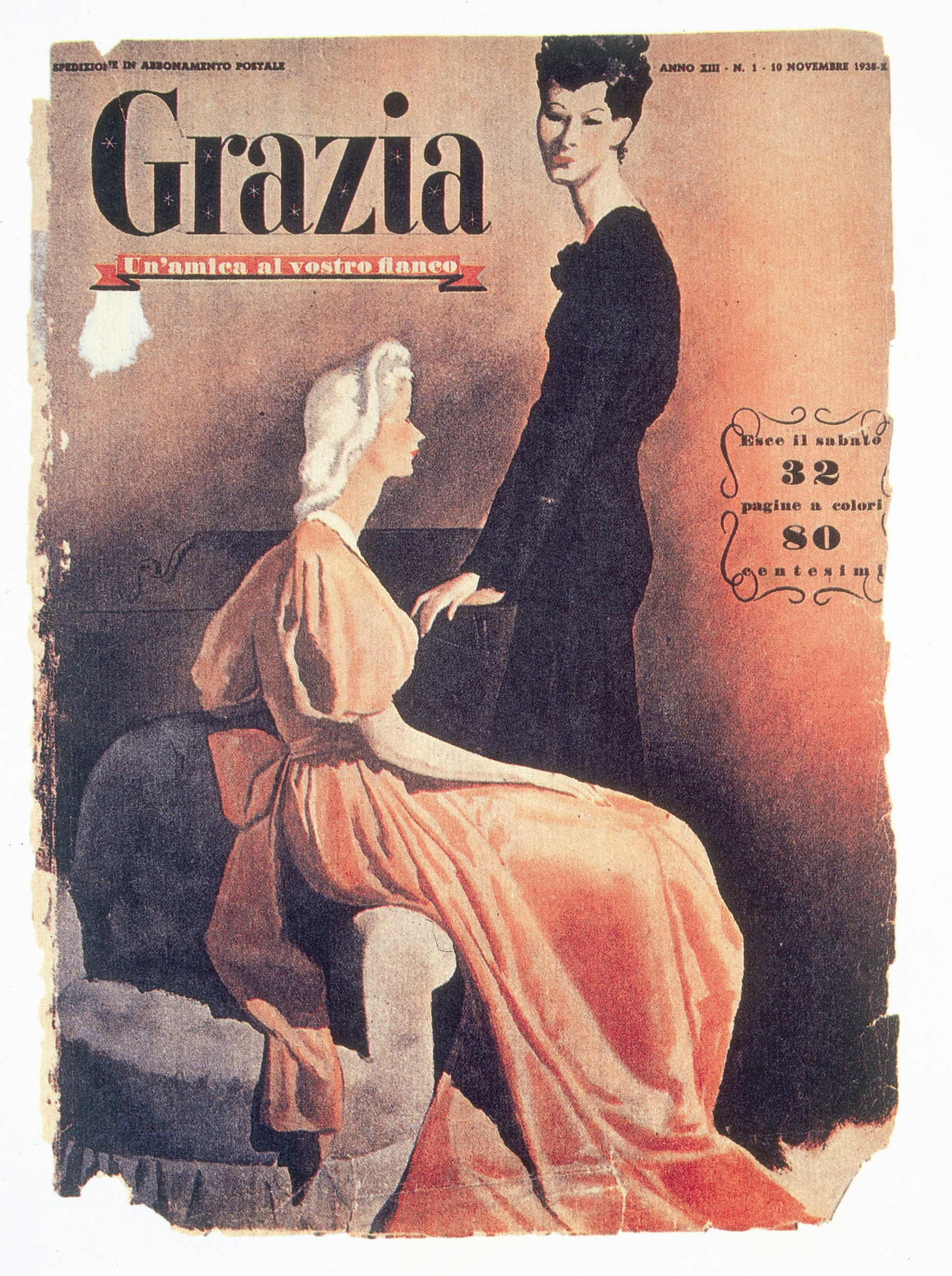
First cover Grazia 1938 Mondadori

The Italian edition of Grazia was first published by Mondadori in November 1938. Mondadori started the magazine to compete with Lei, a women's magazine published by the Rizzoli company. Grazia was modelled on the American magazine Harper's Bazaar. The start of Grazia was a return in Italy to traditionalist values such as cooking and child-rearing.

During the fascist rule in the country the magazine followed the Fascist policies and propaganda. Following World War II the magazine was renewed, but its conservative stance remained. Its conservatism continued during the late 1960s in that although miniskirts were featured in the fashion pages, these garments were commented from a conservative perspective in its social commentaries.

From its beginning in 1938 to September 1943, Bruno Munari served as the art director for the magazine and for another Mondadori title, Tempo.

In Italy it is owned by Mondadori which later became one of Silvio Berlusconi's companies.

Grazia published an article in July 2015 that promoted the breeding of family pets to make money with a statement from the British Royal Society for the Prevention of Cruelty to Animals (RSPCA) critical of Grazia.

== International editions ==
Grazia has international editions in several countries. Its first international edition was published in Bulgaria in March 2004. The British edition of the magazine began publication in February 2005 and is owned in the UK under licence by Bauer Consumer Media. The Greek version was launched in April 2005. In November of the same year its edition in the United Arab Emirates was first issued.

The magazine had an edition in Croatia from February 2006 and in Serbia from June 2006. The Russian edition began publication in March 2007, while the Netherlands followed in August 2007. Grazia India was launched in May 2008. The magazine's Australian edition began publication in July 2008, but folded in February 2013. Grazia Australia reopened in 2015 under new management. In February 2009 the Chinese version of Grazia was started, being its twelfth international edition. The French version of the magazine was first published in August 2009.

The inaugural issue of Grazia Korea was launched on 20 February 2013. It features a photospread of actors Lee Byung-hun, Bae Soo-bin and Kim Do-hyun for the play based on the film Masquerade (2012). Grazia Pakistan was launched in February 2017. The launch party took place at the HSY Mansion in Krachi on 6 February 2017 with publisher and editor-in-chief of Grazia Pakistan, Zahraa Saifullah and the first issue cover girl Mawra Hocane. Grazia Arabia is published in Qatar, and it gives annual Grazia Style awards. In 2018 the awards went to the Italian ambassador in Qatar and Asma Al Thani who is a Qatari adventurer.

=== Germany ===
Only one and a half years after the start of the German edition of Grazia, Mediengruppe Klambt brought the title 2011 into a joint venture in which Gruner + Jahr barely held the majority. In 2017, the women's magazine has been bought back completely. As of 1 January 2018, Mediengruppe Klambt is taking over the 50.1% share, which was previously held by Gruner + Jahr.

== Circulation ==
Grazia had a circulation of 374,213 copies in 1984. The Italian version of the magazine had a circulation of 240,000 copies from January to August 2003. The 2007 circulation of the Italian edition was 218,083 copies. In Italy, the circulation of the magazine rose to 382,000 copies in the first half of 2011. During the same period, the British edition of the magazine had a circulation of 219,741 copies. The circulation in the UK for the second half of 2013 was 160,019 copies.

The German version's published circulation in the third quarter 2017 was 96,632 copies – a drop of around 20 percent compared to the same period of 2016. Since 2016 Grazia has come under pressure at the kiosks with the magazine Olivia of Bauer Media Group.

== See also ==
- List of magazines in Italy
