= Roberto Gervaso =

Italian journalist and writer (1937–2020)

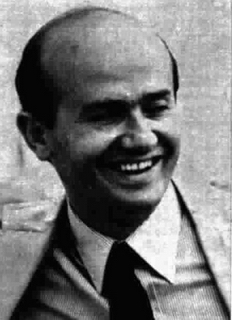
- Born: 9 July 1937; Rome, Kingdom of Italy
- Died: 2 June 2020 (aged 82); Milan, Italy
- Occupations: Writer; journalist

Roberto Gervaso (9 July 1937 – 2 June 2020) was an Italian writer and journalist. He won the Premio Bancarella twice: for L'Italia dei Comuni in 1967, and for Cagliostro in 1973.

Gervaso was born in Turin where he grew up. He started working as an editor and staff writer at Corriere della Sera in 1960. He subsequently moved to Rome where he became a freelance journalist and columnist, contributing to Il Mattino, Il Messaggero and Il Giornale.

In the late 1960s Gervaso co-authored with his mentor and former editor at Corriere, Indro Montanelli, six of the nine volumes of Storia d'Italia. In the mid-1970s he worked as a broadcaster and television presenter at RAI and Canale 5.

== Selected works ==
- Italy in the Golden Centuries (with Indro Montanelli), Regnery Publishing, Washington, D.C., 1967.
- Cagliostro: A Biography, Victor Gollancz Ltd, London, 1974.
- Claretta: The Woman Who Died for Mussolini, Summerstown Books, London, 2002.
