= Agenzia Giornalistica RCS =

Italian news agency

Agenzia Giornalistica RCS (AGR) is an Italian news agency owned by the Italian media conglomerate RCS MediaGroup. It is based in Milan, with offices in Rome and Florence.

AGR produces news and weather bulletins to web portals, local and national newspapers, radio stations and television networks.
