= Blei =

Blei is a German surname meaning "lead". Notable people with the surname include:

- David Blei, American computer scientist
- Franz Blei (1871–1942), Austrian writer and literary critic
- Norbert Blei (1935–2013), American writer

== See also ==
- Bley
- Blay (surname)
