= Annabella (magazine) =

Women's magazine in Italy (1933–1983)

- Categories: Women's magazine
- Frequency: Weekly
- Publisher: Rizzoli
- Founder: Angelo Rizzoli
- Founded: 1933
- First issue: July 1933
- Final issue: 1983
- Company: Rizzoli
- Country: Italy
- Based in: Milan
- Language: Italian

Annabella was an Italian women's magazine which existed between 1933 and 1983 with a one-year interruption from 1944 to 1945.

== History and profile ==
The magazine was launched by Angelo Rizzoli in 1933 with the title Lei: rivista di vita femminile as a weekly. The first issue appeared in mid-July 1933. The publisher was Rizzoli company, and like other Rizzoli magazines it consisted of 16 pages with full-bleed photographs on the front and back covers. Also, like its sister magazines it was printed in a certain color which was sepia for Lei. During the initial period it targeted the bourgeoisie housewives and featured articles on beauty, fashion, cooking, domestic decoration, and current events.

In November 1938 it was renamed as Annabella due to the opposition of the Fascist authorities over the use of Lei as a magazine title. It was temporarily closed between July 1944 and 5 July 1945. In the post-war period the magazine adopted a conservative stance. Annabella ceased publication in 1983 and was succeeded by another women's magazine Anna.

== Contributors and content ==
Filippo Piazzi was the sole editor of the magazine in the period 1933–1938 when it was published with the title Lei. During this period like many other leading Italian magazines of the 1930s Lei employed the photographs taken by the German photographer Paul Wolff through the Schostal agency. The Ukrainian-Italian journalist Giorgio Scerbanenco was among the contributors of Annabella and became its director in the 1960s. In an article dated 31 July 1960 Scerbanenco stated that going to the movies alone was not a proper activity for women particularly during the daytime on working days due to some risks of attacks by men. Brunella Gasperini published her writings in the column entitled Ditelo a Brunella for a long time. Lietta Tornabuoni was another contributor of the magazine. In one of her articles published in the late 1960s she argued that for men from the lower classes miniskirts were vulgar, but more educated men believed that these should be accepted by Italians.

In the period between 1953 and 1963 the space for the advertisements in Annabella increased from 20.3% to 39.5%. The magazine started an advice hotline for its readers in 1974. The sexological advice was provided by Don Liggeri, a priest and a contributor of the magazine.

== Circulation ==
Annabella had a circulation of 250,000 copies in the period between 1952 and 1953. It was the second best-selling women's magazine in Italy after Grazia during the first half of the 1960s. It nearly sold 300,000 copies whereas Grazia 350,000 copies. In the 1970s the circulation of Annabella reached half a million copies per week.
