= City (newspaper) =

- Front page of the Milan edition of City from 2 December 2011
- Type: Free daily newspaper
- Owner(s): RCS MediaGroup
- Founded: 3 September 2001 (Milan)
- Language: Italian
- Ceased publication: 24 February 2012
- Headquarters: Milan, Italy
- Circulation: 850.000 (2006)
- Website: http://city.corriere.it/

City was an Italian free daily newspaper published in Italy.

== History and profile ==
City was published by RCS MediaGroup. Nine separate editions were produced for the cities of Milan, Rome, Turin, Naples, Bologna, Florence, Verona, Bari and Genoa.

In the period of 2001-2002 City had a circulation of 400,000 copies.

The newspaper ceased the publication on 24 February 2012.
