= Sette (magazine) =

Italian news magazine

- Editor: Pier Luigi Vercesi
- Former editors: Andrea Monti
- Categories: News magazine Political magazine Lifestyle magazine
- Frequency: Weekly
- Circulation: 464,428 (November 2013)
- Publisher: RCS MediaGroup SPA
- First issue: 1 September 1987; 38 years ago
- Company: RCS MediaGroup
- Country: Italy
- Based in: Milan
- Language: Italian
- Website: Sette
- ISSN: 2037-2663

Sette, also known as Corriere della Sera Sette, is a news, political and lifestyle magazine based in Milan, Italy. The magazine is the weekly supplement of the daily newspaper Corriere della Sera. It was the first colour supplement distributed with a daily paper in Italy.

== History and profile ==
Sette was established in September 1987. The owner of the magazine is RCS Media Group, and its publisher is RCS MediaGroup SPA. The magazine has its headquarters in Milan. Sette was sold weekly with the Thursday edition of Corriere della Sera. In October 1987 it began to be distributed with the Friday edition of the paper.

Andrea Monti served as the editor of Sette. Pier Luigi Vercesi is the editor of the weekly which features articles on politics, news, fashion, art, leisure, culture, entertainment and lifestyle.

In May 2004 the title of the magazine switched from Corriere della Sera Sette to Corriere della Sera magazine. On 26 November 2009 the name was again changed and the original title began to be used, Corriere della Sera Sette.

== Circulation ==
Sette had a circulation of 690,000 copies in 2000, 683,000 copies in 2001 and 634,000 copies in 2002. Between December 2002 and November 2003 the average circulation of the magazine was 623,335 copies. From January to August 2003 its circulation rose to 634,000 copies. Its total circulation was 626,000 copies in 2003. In 2004 the magazine sold 648,000 copies. It was the second best-selling news magazine in Italy in 2007 with a circulation of 528,792 copies.

In November 2013 Sette sold 464,428 copies, including the circulation of its print and digital editions.

== See also ==
- List of magazines in Italy
