= IO Donna =

Italian women's fashion magazine

iO Donna
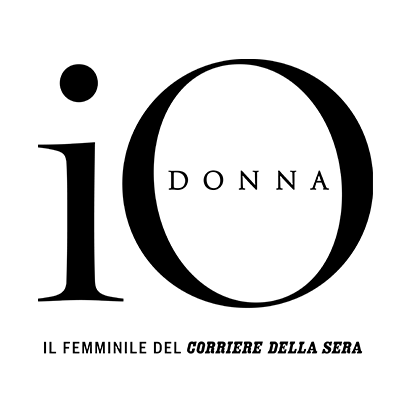
- Editor-in-chief: Danda Santini
- Categories: Women's magazine; Fashion magazine
- Frequency: Weekly
- Founded: 1996; 30 years ago
- Country: Italy
- Based in: Milan
- Language: Italian
- Website: www.iodonna.it
- OCLC: 805657774

iO Donna (English: "Me, Woman") is a weekly women's magazine and Saturday supplement of the Italian daily newspaper Corriere della Sera. The magazine is the first supplement of a daily which focuses on women readers. It has been in circulation since 1996 and is based in Milan, Italy.

== History and profile ==
iO Donna was started in March 1996, being the first women's magazine as a supplement of an Italian daily newspaper. The magazine is sold as the Saturday supplement of Corriere della Sera. It is part of RCS MediaGroup SPA, and is published in Milan by RCS Pubblicià, the magazine division of the company. As of 2015, Diamante D'Alessio was the editor-in-chief of the weekly which features articles on art, culture, fashion, cosmetics, entertainment, decor, and cuisine. D'Alessio was appointed to the post in January 2010.

Spanish daily newspaper El Mundo's women's supplement Yo Donna, started in 2005, was modeled on iO Donna.

The website of iO Donna was launched in 2012.

The circulation of iO Donna was 514,946 copies from December 2002 to November 2003. It was 502,057 copies in 2007. Its average circulation was 435,000 copies in 2009. In 2010 the magazine sold 439,023 copies.

== See also ==
- List of magazines in Italy
