= Indro Montanelli =

Italian journalist and historian (1909–2001)

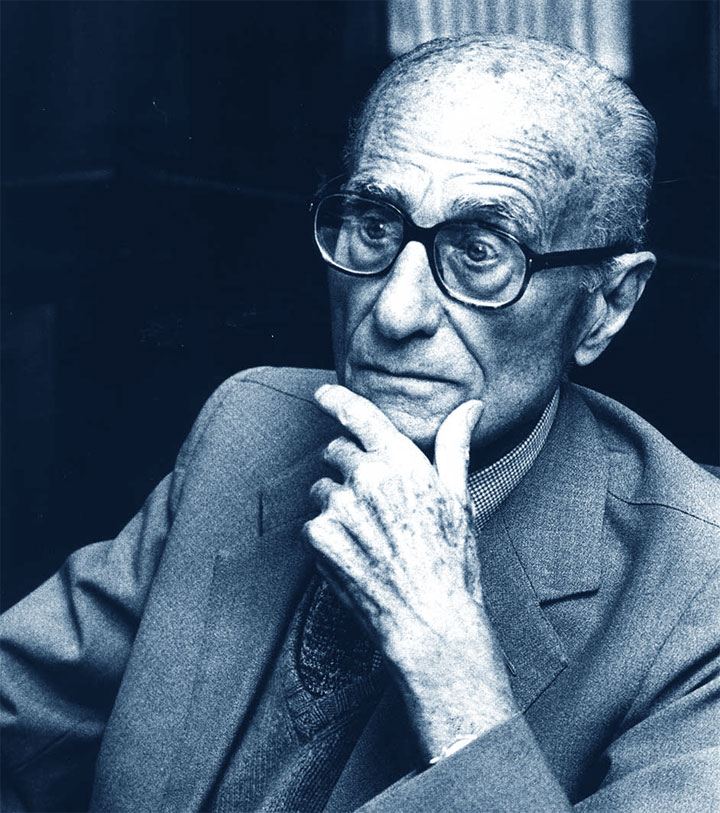
- Born: Indro Alessandro Raffaello Schizogene Montanelli; 22 April 1909; Fucecchio, Kingdom of Italy
- Died: 22 July 2001 (aged 92); Milan, Italy
- Other name: Cilindro ("Top Hat")
- Education: University of Florence
- Occupations: Historian; journalist; writer
- Years active: 1930–2001
- Known for: One of the fifty World Press Freedom Heroes, work at Corriere della Sera, founder of il Giornale, author of Storia d'Italia
- Notable work: General Della Rovere (1959)
- Awards: Order of the Lion of Finland; Princess of Asturias Awards; World Press Freedom Heroes

Signature
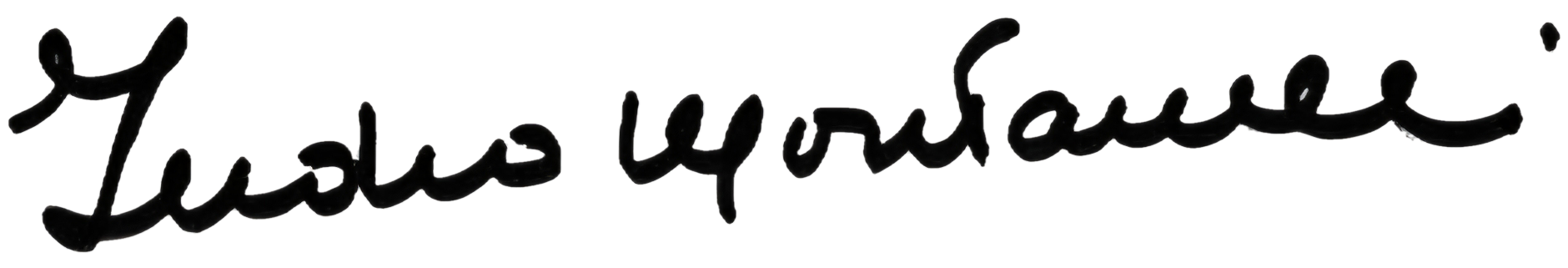

Indro Alessandro Raffaello Schizogene Montanelli (22 April 1909 – 22 July 2001) was an Italian journalist, historian, and writer.

Montanelli originally volunteered in the Second Italo-Ethiopian War and admired Benito Mussolini's dictatorship, but his political stance shifted in 1943. He joined the liberal resistance group Giustizia e Libertà, and in 1944, he and his wife were discovered and arrested by Nazi authorities. He was sentenced to death by firing squad but fled to Switzerland the day before his scheduled execution with the assistance of a secret service double agent.

After World War II, Montanelli continued his work at Corriere della Sera, where he started working in 1938, and distinguished himself as a liberal-conservative for many decades. As an intransigent, anticonformist, and anti-communist, he defended the idea of another political right, which was sober, cultured, pessimistic, and distrustful of mass society. In 1977, the Red Brigades terrorist group kneecapped him; however, he forgave them years later. He was also a novelist and historian, especially remembered for his Storia d'Italia (History of Italy) in volumes.

After leaving the Corriere della Sera in 1973, due to a perceived turn to the left, Montanelli worked as the editor-in-chief of Silvio Berlusconi-owned newspaper il Giornale for many years. Being opposed to Berlusconi's political ambitions, he quit as editor of il Giornale, and founded il Giornale nuovo in 1974. Berlusconi officially entered politics in 1994, after which he returned to the Corriere della Sera in 1995, and worked there until his death. Both the Italian centre-left and centre-right tried to reclaim his figure; the former, which overlooked his conservatism and anti-communism, emphasized his anti-Berlusconist militancy, while the latter, after having portrayed him as a useful idiot of the post-communist left, underplayed his opposition to Berlusconi.

== Early life and education ==
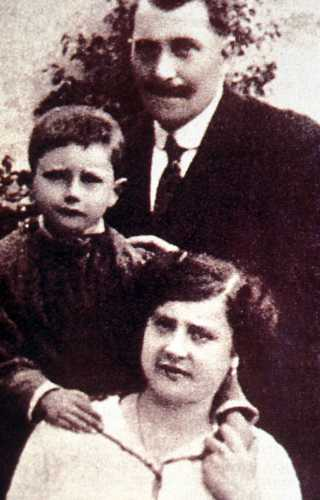
Montanelli with his parents in the 1910s

Montanelli was born in Fucecchio, near Florence, on 22 April, 1909. His father, Sestilio Montanelli, was a high-school philosophy teacher and his mother, Maddalena Doddoli, was the daughter of a rich cotton merchant. The name Indro was chosen by his father after the Hindu god Indra.

Montanelli earned a law degree from the University of Florence in 1930, writing a thesis on the electoral reform of Benito Mussolini’s Fascist regime. He reportedly argued that the measure amounted not to reform, but to the abolition of elections. He later said that it was during his stay in Grenoble, while taking language lessons, that he realized journalism was his true vocation.

== Early journalistic career ==
Montanelli began his journalistic career by writing for the fascist newspaper Il Selvaggio ("The Savage"), then directed by Mino Maccari, and in 1932 for the Universale, a magazine published once every fortnight, offering no pay. Montanelli later stated that he had viewed fascism as a movement capable of fostering an Italian national consciousness and addressing social and economic divisions between northern and southern Italy. His support began to decline in 1935, when Mussolini ordered the suppression of Universale and other publications that expressed critical views of fascism. It was in 1934 in Paris that Montanelli began writing for the crime pages of the daily newspaper Paris-Soir as a foreign correspondent in Norway, where he briefly worked as a fisherman, and later in Canada, where he ended up working on a farm in Alberta.

From there, Montanelli began a collaboration with Webb Miller of the United Press in New York. While working for the United Press, he learned to write for the lay public in a style that would distinguish him within the realm of Italian journalism. One lesson he took to heart from Miller was to "always write as if writing to a milkman from Ohio". He later recalled this open and approachable manner throughout his life. Another anecdote from Montanelli’s time in the United States concerned a class he was teaching: when a student asked him to explain an essay he had read, Montanelli replied that he would repeat it, as the student clearly had not understood it. The student then struck the table and said that, if the essay was not understandable, it was Montanelli who was at fault and should revise it. It was then that Montanelli realized that he, who had come from the authoritarian regime of Fascist Italy, had just had a confrontation with democracy.

During this time, Montanelli conducted his first interview with a celebrity, Henry Ford, who shocked him by admitting he did not have a driver's license. During the interview, surrounded by American art depicting pastoral and frontier subjects, Ford began to reverentially talk about the Founding Fathers of the United States. Looking at the décor, Montanelli asked him how he felt about having destroyed their world. Puzzled, Ford asked what he meant. Montanelli pressed on that the automobile and Ford's revolutionary assembly line system had forever transformed the country. Ford's shocked expression had caused Montanelli to realize that Ford, like most "geniuses" of the time, had not the slightest idea of what he had really done.

=== Reporter in Abyssinia ===
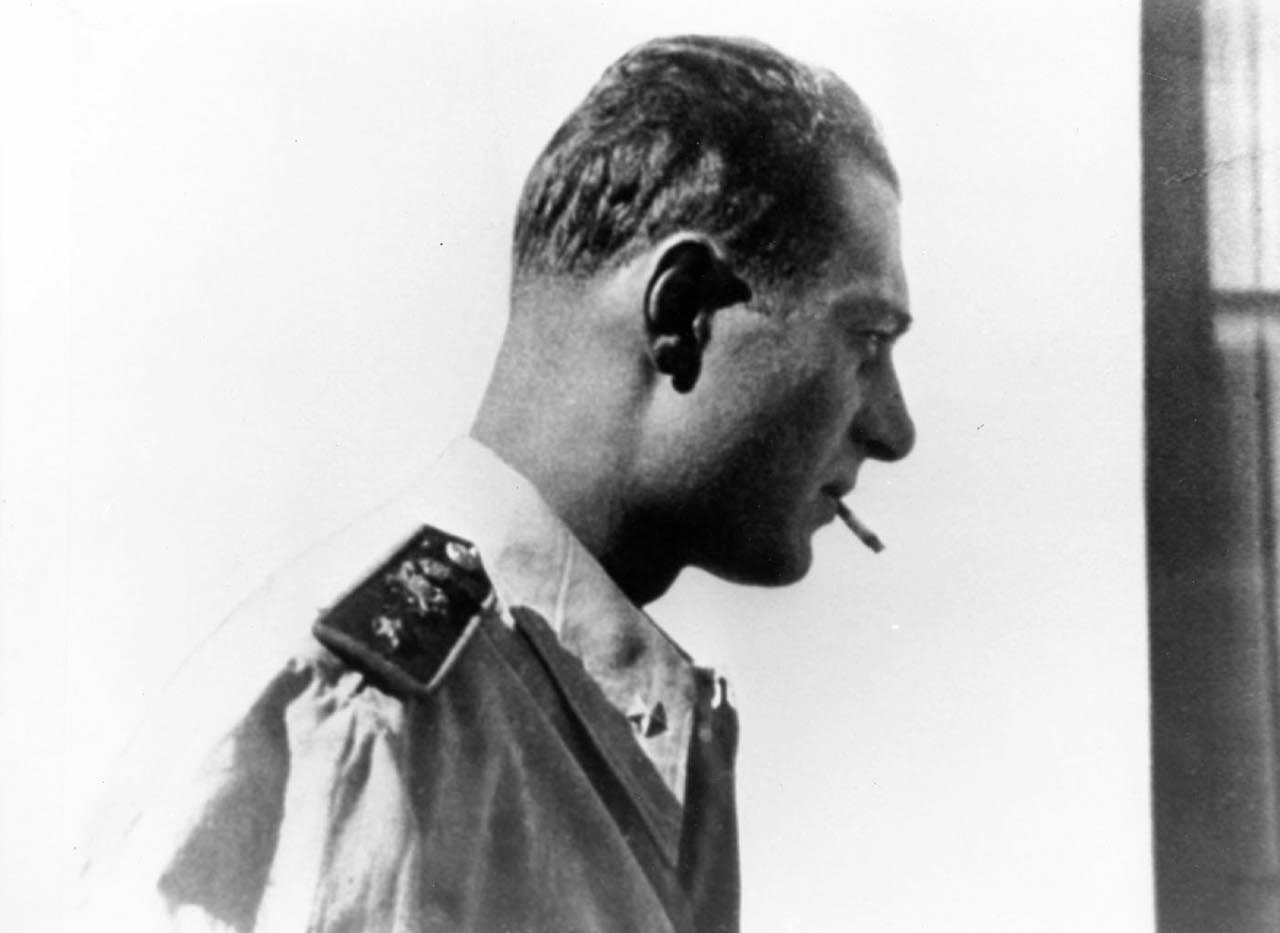
Montanelli in Ethiopia, 1936

When Mussolini invaded Abyssinia (Ethiopia) in 1935 with the intent of making Italy an empire (Second Italo–Abyssinian War), Montanelli abandoned his collaboration with the United Press and became a voluntary conscript for this war. Aged 23, Montanelli was put in charge of a 100-strong army of local men. He later said, "It was a beautiful two years." He said he believed then that this was the chance for Italy to bring civilization to the perceived savage world of Africa. While stationed in East Africa, Montanelli entered a madamato relationship with a 12-year-old Bilen girl, a practice common among Italian soldiers in the colonies.

Montanelli began writing about the war to his father, who, without Montanelli's knowledge, sent the letters to one of the most famous journalists of those times, Ugo Ojetti, who published them regularly in the Italian newspaper Corriere della Sera.

=== Reporter during the Spanish Civil War ===
On his return from Abyssinia, Montanelli became a foreign correspondent in Spain for the daily newspaper Il Messaggero, where he experienced the Spanish Civil War on the side of Francisco Franco's Nationalist troops. In this period, he shared a room with Kim Philby, who one day disappeared. Years later, Montanelli received a mysterious note from Philby saying: "Thanks for everything. Including your socks." Decades later, Philby revealed himself to the world as a Soviet mole spy.

After the capture of the city of Santander, Montanelli wrote that "it had been a long military walk with only one enemy: the heat". This judgement contrasted with the propaganda of the times that painted that battle as a bloodshed on the side of the Italian contingent. In fact, the only casualty he noted but never reported was a single death in the Alpini regiment caused by a mule kick that threw the trooper down into a dry riverbed. For this article, he was repatriated, tried, and expelled from the National Fascist Party (PNF) and from the official organization of Italian journalists. During the trial, he was asked why he had written such an unpatriotic article. He replied: "Show me a single casualty of that battle, because a battle without casualties is not a real battle!" The trial ended with an acquittal.

=== Journalistic activity during World War II ===
==== Eastern and Northern Europe ====
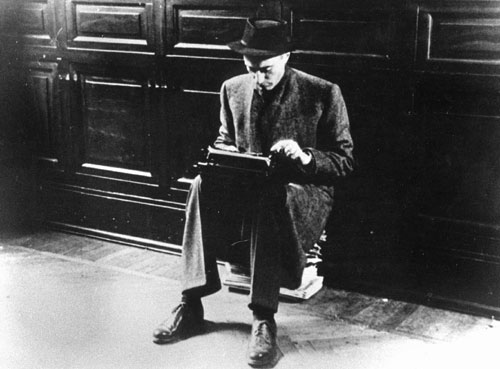
Montanelli in 1940 with an Olivetti MP1 typewriter that was later replaced by his trademark Olivetti Lettera 22

The stand Montanelli took against fascism led him to his first conflict with the Italian authorities. His PNF membership was revoked thereafter, and Montanelli did nothing to regain this document that at the time conferred a series of privileges on its holders due to the country being dominated by Mussolini's fascist movement. To avoid the worst, the then minister of culture Giuseppe Bottai offered in 1938 to Montanelli the job of director of the Institute of Culture in Tallinn, Estonia, and lecturer in Italian at the University of Tartu, Estonia. In this period, Aldo Borelli, the then director of the Corriere della Sera, asked Montanelli to engage in a collaboration as a foreign correspondent; he could not be employed as a journalist because this had been forbidden by the fascist regime. Montanelli began to correspond for this newspaper from Estonia and Albania during the Italian annexation of these countries.

On 1 September 1939, Germany invaded Poland. Montanelli was sent to report from the front in a Mercedes accompanied by German state functionaries. In the vicinity of the city of Grudziądz, the car was stopped by a convoy of German tanks. On one of these stood Adolf Hitler himself, a few feet from Montanelli. When Hitler was told that the only person in casual clothes was Italian, he jumped out of the tank. Eyeing Montanelli, he began a ten-minute speech followed by a military salute and exit. Albert Speer, who had also been in the convoy with fellow artist Arno Breker, corroborated the story in 1979. Apart from this episode, which Montanelli was forbidden to report, there had been little to report because the invasion of Poland was completed so rapidly that it was over within weeks. It was allegedly he who reported on the Skirmish of Krojanty and created a myth from it.

Montanelli was not welcome in Italy and decided to move to Lithuania. The joint Nazi German–Soviet invasion of Poland instinctively told him that more was brewing on the Soviet Union border. His instinct was correct because shortly after his arrival in Kaunas, the seat of the Lithuanian government, the Soviet Union issued its ultimatum to the Baltic republics. At this point, Montanelli continued to travel towards Tallinn as it was his wish to see the last of a free and democratic Estonia, which was soon invaded by the Soviet Union. At this point, Montanelli was not popular in Italy nor Germany because of his pro-Estonian and pro-Polish articles, and had been expelled by the Soviet Union for being a foreigner. Thus, he was forced to cross the Baltic Sea and reach Helsinki, the Finnish capital.

In Finland, Montanelli began writing articles about the Sámi and the reindeer, although this was not for long as Vyacheslav Molotov had made requests on the Finnish government for the annexation of part of the Finnish land to the Soviet Union. The Finnish delegation, headed by Juho Kusti Paasikivi, had refused to give in to these requests. Montanelli was not able to write about the details of the talks between the Soviet and Finnish delegations, as they were shrouded in secrecy, but he was able to interview Paasikivi, who was happy to fill him in on everything except for the content of the talks.

Throughout the Winter War that ensued, Montanelli wrote pro-Finnish articles both from the front and from bomb-stricken Helsinki, writing about the enterprises of the battle of Tolvajärvi, and of men like captain Pajakka who, with 200 Sámi, successfully confronted 40,000 Russians in the region of Petsamo. Back in Italy, Montanelli's stories had been followed with great enthusiasm by the public but not so enthusiastic was the response of the fascist leaders who were committed to an alliance with the Soviet Union. When Borelli, director of the Corriere della Sera, had been ordered to censor Montanelli's articles, he replied that "thanks to his articles the Corriere increased its sales from 500,000 to 900,000 copies: are you going to reimburse me?" When the Winter War was over and the non-aggression pact was signed between the Soviet Union and Finland, Montanelli was personally thanked by Carl Gustaf Emil Mannerheim himself for writing in favor of the Finnish cause.

==== Invasion of Norway ====
Before his return to Italy, Montanelli witnessed the Operation Weserübung (the Nazi German invasion of Norway) and was arrested by the German army for his hostility to the German–Italian alliance. He escaped with the help of his friend Vidkun Quisling and made his way north, to where British and French troops were landing at Narvik. There he was met by Major Carton de Wiart who explained that there were no more than 10,000 Allied troops in Norway, many untrained for combat. Nobody seemed to know where their garrison was. The British wanted to advance inland and attack the Germans, but the French preferred to hold their positions. When the Germans began bombing these positions, the Allies were forced to embark again and withdraw to England.

==== Balkans and Greece ====
With Italy's entrance in the war (June 1940), Montanelli was sent to France and the Balkans. He was assigned the responsibility of following the Italian military campaign from Greece and Albania as a correspondent. There, he recounted that he had written little: "I remained at that front various months, writing almost nothing, a small reason was because I fell ill with typhus and a huge one because I refused to push as a glorious military campaign the quaking pummeling that we caught down there." An article published in the 12 September 1940 issue of Panorama was considered defeatist by the censors of Minculpop (Ministry of Popular Culture), who in turn ordered the closure of the periodical.

==== Arrest and death sentence ====
After witnessing war and destruction in the Balkans, and the disastrous Italian invasion of Greece, Montanelli decided to join the Italian resistance movement against the fascist regime by joining the liberal Giustizia e Libertà clandestine group. There he met socialist leader Sandro Pertini, who would later become president of Italy from 1978 to 1985. Montanelli was eventually once again captured by the Germans, tried, and sentenced to death. In the Milanese prison of San Vittore, he met Mike Bongiorno, who would later become one of the most famous Italian television personalities. In prison, he also made the acquaintance of General Della Rovere, who was said to have been arrested while on a secret mission on behalf of the Allies. The truth was that the man was a thief called Giovanni Bertoni, a spy for the Germans. Bertoni was so taken in by the military character he was playing that he refused to relay any information to his German captors and was executed like an enemy official. After the war, Montanelli dedicated a book to this incident, Il generale Della Rovere (1959), which later turned into a Golden Lion-winning movie directed by Roberto Rossellini and starring Vittorio De Sica.

Salvation came at the end of 1944 with the help of unknown conspirators who arranged for his transfer to a prison in Verona. The transfer was then transformed into a dash for the Swiss border. The identity of these conspirators remained a mystery until decades later when it appeared that it had been the result of collusion by several agencies. Among them, Marshal Mannerheim allegedly put pressure on his German allies. To Nikolaus von Falkenhorst, the commander of the German troops stationed in Finland, he said: "You are executing a gentleman." This resulted in Berlin's opening of an inquiry. In 1945, while hiding in Switzerland, he published the novel Drei Kreuze (Three Crosses), which later appeared in Italian with the title Qui non-riposano (Here They Do Not Rest). Inspired by Thornton Wilder's The Bridge of San Luis Rey, the story begins on 17 September 1944 when a Val d'Ossola priest buries three unknown corpses and commemorates them with three anonymous crosses.

=== Career after World War II ===
==== Corriere della Sera ====
Throughout the post-war years, Montanelli retained an idiosyncratic and undiplomatic style, even when this made him very unpopular among his peers and employers. This is well illustrated in his book La stecca nel coro, which translates as "The False Note in the Chorus" with the meaning of "Going Against the Current", and that is a list of articles he composed between 1974 and 1994.

After the war, Montanelli resumed his career at the Corriere della Sera, authoring sympathetic articles from Hungary during the 1956 Hungarian Revolution. His first-hand reportages inspired him to write the play I sogni muoiono all'alba (Dreams Die at Dawn), which was later adapted to film. In 1959, Montanelli interviewed for the first time in history a pope, who at the time was Pope John XXIII; the pope declared that he picked Montanelli exactly because he was an atheist and not a Catholic sympathizer. From the mid-1960s, after the death of the newspaper's owners Mario and Vittorio Crespi, and the serious illness of the third brother, Aldo, the ownership of the newspaper passed to Aldo's daughter, Giulia Maria. Under her tight control, earning her the nickname "the czarina" from Montanelli, the daily took a sudden turn to the left. This new launch took place in 1972 with the abrupt dismissal of director Giovanni Spadolini. Montanelli expressed an indictment of the procedure in an interview on L'Espresso, declaring: "A director is not sent away like a thieving house-servant." Turning to the Crespi family, he branded their "authoritarian, bullying junta ways that they have chosen in order to impose their decision".

==== Founding of il Giornale nuovo ====
After breaking with the Corriere della Sera, which he perceived as having moved too much to the left, Montanelli founded and directed a new conservative daily, il Giornale nuovo, from 1973 to 1994, together with Enzo Bettiza. In his last interview before his death in 2017, Bettiza said that Montanelli despised the bourgeoisie he defended and admired the communists he attacked. About the 1956 Hungarian Revolution, Bettiza said that Montanelli was convinced the revolt was due to workers wanting true socialism.

==== Kneecapping by the Red Brigades ====
On 2 September 1977, Montanelli was shot four times in the legs by a two-man commando of the Red Brigades outside the Milanese head-office of Corriere della Sera. The terrorists made sure to give him non-mortal wounds. His friend and surgeon was amazed at how "four shots could hit those [long, thin] chicken legs of his and still completely miss a major artery or nerve bundle". In his ironical and satirical vein, he thanked Il Duce. He credited his indoctrination as a child in the Balilla fascist youth and its mantra, "to die on your feet", for saving his life. He maintained that had he not held on to the railing during the incident, the fourth shot would have surely hit him in the stomach. In what supporters of Montanelli saw as a petty instance of insult to injury, the Corriere della Sera dedicated an article to the incident omitting his name from the title ("Milan ... journalist kneecapped"), for which the paper's editor Piero Ottone received criticism. This was not limited to the Corriere della Sera, as it happened during a period in which the Red Brigades were targeting journalists through the use of kneecapping, without murdering them, and two other journalists suffered the same fate in a matter of days.

In later years, Montanelli said that he expected the attack and was not surprised by it, and came to forgive the terrorists, who saw him as a servant of the regime, as well as of multinational corporations. In il Giornale, he wrote days after the attack that "the prose of the Red Brigades does not differ much from that of certain weekly magazines which point to me as 'the watchdog of the bourgeoisie'."

==== Quarrel with Silvio Berlusconi and final years ====
When Silvio Berlusconi, who since 1977 had held the majority of shares in il Giornale entered politics with the founding of a new populist political party, Forza Italia, Montanelli came under heavy pressure to switch his editorial line to a position favorable to Berlusconi. Montanelli never hid his bad opinion of Berlusconi, saying: "He lies as he breathes." In the end, protesting his independence, he founded a new daily, for which he resurrected the name La Voce ("The Voice"), which had belonged to a renowned newspaper run by Giuseppe Prezzolini. La Voce, which had garnered a devoted but limited readership, folded after about a year, and Montanelli returned to the Corriere della Sera. In 1994, Montanelli was awarded the International Editor of the Year Award from the World Press Review.

From 1995 to 2001, Montanelli was the chief letters editor of Corriere della Sera, answering a letter a day on a page of the newspaper known as "La Stanza di Montanelli" ("Montanelli's Room"). Montanelli spent his last years opposing Berlusconi's politics. He was a mentor to a group of colleagues, followers, and students including Mario Cervi, Marco Travaglio, Paolo Mieli, Roberto Ridolfi, Andrea Claudio Galluzzo, Beppe Severgnini, Marcello Foa and Roberto Gervaso. Montanelli died on 22 July 2001 at the La Madonnina clinic in Milan. The following day, the Corriere della Sera published a letter on its front page titled "Indro Montanelli's farewell to his readers".

== Legacy ==
Montanelli had been nicknamed "The Prince of Journalism" by his own colleagues while he was still alive, gaining considerable esteem even among liberals and political left-oriented journalists; Enzo Biagi, Giorgio Bocca, Aldo Grasso, Gianfrancesco Zincone, and many others considered him a master of journalism and his objectivity and attention to history as a model to teach and replicate. As a result, both the Italian centre-left and the Italian centre-right tried to reclaim Montanelli for themselves. Politically, Montanelli was an anti-communist who defended the idea of another political right, which was an alternative to that of Silvio Berlusconi, whom he opposed. Since his death, the political left emphasized Montanelli's anti-Berlusconism over his anti-communism and conservatism, while the political right minimized his opposition to Berlusconi after having accused him of serving the interests of the post-communist left.

A polarizing figure, Montanelli's journalism was distinct from both the prevailing pro-government journalism, which was linked to the ruling Christian Democracy, and to the liberal-democratic journalism of the likes of Mario Pannunzio, whom Montanelli admired. In his letters, Montanelli once said: "If you lack the holy fire inside, if you're not made for this work, if you lack a natural appendix with a typewriter... it's pointless to do this job." He left a number of first-person reportages and interviews with important historical figures, including Charles de Gaulle, Benito Mussolini, Pope John XXIII, and Winston Churchill.

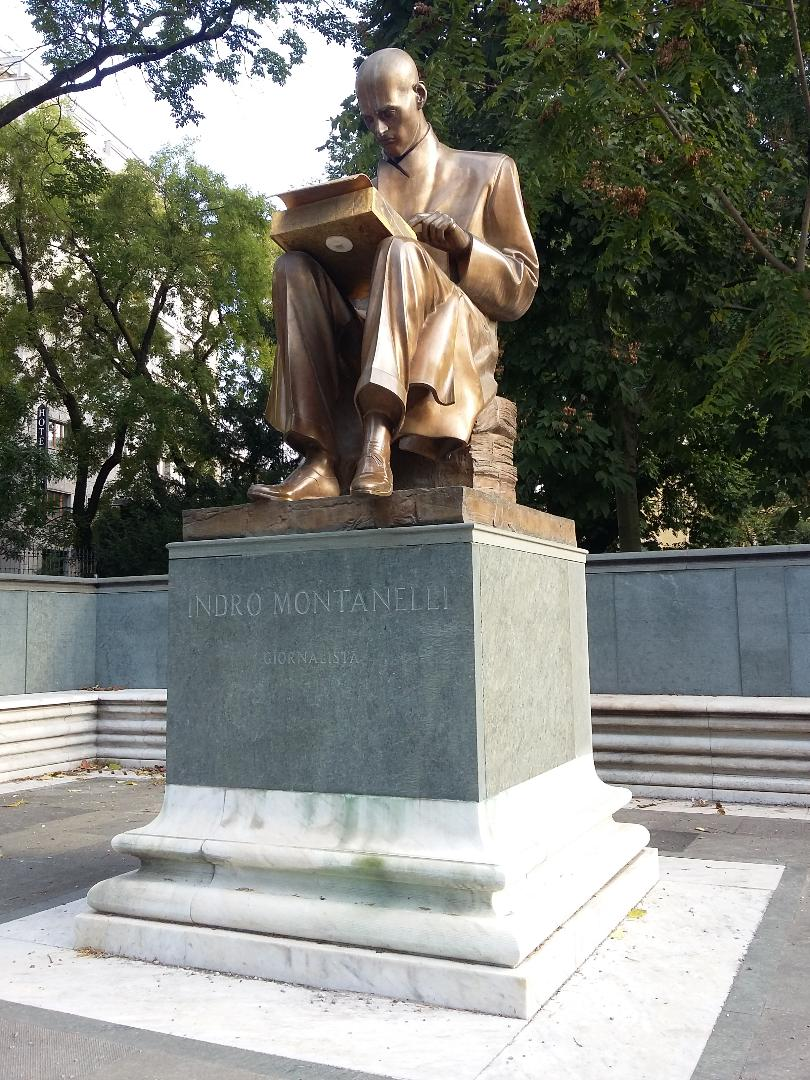
Monument to Montanelli in Milan

Angelo Del Boca, the historian who first researched Italian war crimes in Ethiopia and made Montanelli acknowledge the use of poison gas in 1996 that he had previously denied, retained great esteem for Montanelli and defended his marriage with the young girl. He said: "It makes no sense [to call him a racist and rapist], it was an act of integration, especially since Montanelli kept a good relationship with her for years. At the time, but maybe even nowadays, it was normal to marry women of that age in Africa; it was initially encouraged as an element of fraternization." Giuseppe Sala, Milan's mayor of the centre-left Democratic Party, refused to remove the statue on the grounds that it was to honor his journalistic contributions. He said: "He was a great journalist who fought for freedom of the press. When we judge our own lives, can we say that ours are spotless? Lives must be judged in their complexity.", while recognizing his dismay at the lightness of the way Montanelli spoke about his actions in Abyssinia. Among others, the group Sentinelli di Milano had asked Sala to remove Montanelli's statue from the gardens of Porta Venezia because "until the end of his days, Montanelli proudly claimed the fact that he had bought and married a twelve-year-old Eritrean girl as his sex slave."

== Controversies ==
=== Child bride ===
While stationed in Italian Ethiopia during the Second Italo-Ethiopian War, Montanelli married a 12-year-old Eritrean girl. In a 1969 episode of the talk show L'ora della verità (The Hour of the Truth), Montanelli told host Gianni Bisiach: "I think I chose well. She was a beautiful girl of 12 years. I'm sorry. But in Africa it's different." During the interview, he was interrupted by a question from the feminist and journalist Elvira Banotti, who asked him how he could justify his marriage to a child, since marriage in Europe to a 12-year-old girl would be considered abhorrent. Montanelli replied that "in Abyssinia that's how it works", and that "at 12 years they normally marry, they are women already". His confrontation with Banotti continued for the rest of the episode. The practice of the madamato, which Montanelli referred to in the interview, was a temporary more uxorio relationship between Italian men and local women, often girls between 8 and 12 years of age, which was legal at the time in the Italian colonies. The practice was abolished by the Fascist Racial Laws that prohibited miscegenation.

In a 1982 interview with Enzo Biagi, Montanelli called her "a little docile animal", and said that he bought her for ₤500. According to Montanelli, the relationship was never violent or non-consensual, and both the family and the girl agreed to it. The girl named her firstborn Indro after Montanelli years following their separation.

The girl's age was unclear. Initially, he stated that she was 12 years old; later on, he described her as 14. He called her Destà; other times, Fatima. Marco Travaglio, one of Montanelli's students, claimed he was not a pedophile and only wanted to adapt to Abyssinian tradition.

Montanelli stated he struggled to "overcome her smell" due to the goat tallow soaked in her hair. She had been infibulated at birth, causing neurogenic sexual dysfunction in-addition to difficulty having intercourse.

International attention and further scrutiny were brought in the wake of the 2020 Black Lives Matter protests.

=== Racism ===
While working as a journalist for the fascist magazine Civiltà Fascista, Montanelli had argued that under no circumstances should soldiers fraternize with black people, at least "until they had been given culture." Montanelli wrote many articles expressing racist ideas, declaring the superiority of the white race, and supporting colonialism.

=== Fascism ===
In 1996, he sent a letter to former Nazi officer Erich Priebke, whom he revered as "Mr. Captain", after Priebke's initial sentencing of 15 years by the Supreme Court of Cassation. He sympathized, saying: "As an old soldier, and even if from an army very different from his, I know very well that you could not do anything different from what you did." About the Ardeatine massacre, he reclaimed the death of Giuseppe Cordero Lanza di Montezemolo and Filippo de Grenet as "two of my old and dear friends", comparing them to his own detention in San Vittore Prison where he said he could "suffer the same fate as the hostages of the Ardeatine". He said that "even among us Italians there are men who think right...even when those who think and see unfair are the masters of the square", concluding with: "Best wishes, Mr. Captain."

In 1999, during the trial of the Nazi captain Theodor Saevecke for the Piazzale Loreto massacre, Montanelli was cited by the defence as a witness. He attributed all responsibility to the fascists. He claimed in San Vittore, the reprisals were carried out by the repubblichini (supporters of the Italian Social Republic) and described the massacre as a "slovenly operation" due to regulations, making the fascists force prisoners to start running before shooting them. When pressed on the possibility of taking fifteen prisoners without the consent of the SS officer, he replied: "Yes, because in prison the prisoners were divided into those 'hostages' of the repubblichini and those in the hands of the Germans, and each had his own freely...the interrogations of the Germans were long, unnerving, but neither I nor anyone else was subjected to brutality." Contradicting this account, a letter of his from that period was shown in court in which he claimed the Germans broke his rib and injured his liver. In response, Montanelli claimed it was not him who was beaten, but Gasparini and it was done by the repubblichini. He reduced the role of Alfredo Ildefonso Schuster in his release from prison and attributed it to the OVRA spy Luca Osteria (known at the time as Ugo Osteria). In response to the indignation of the victims' families throughout his deposition, he concluded: "They may as well make noises, I don't give a damn about their noises. I don't tell lies."

Initially, Montanelli questioned reports of Italian use of chemical weapons in Ethiopia. After historian Angelo Del Boca’s research, he acknowledged their use in 1996.

=== Modern responses ===
In March 2019, the feminist group Non Una Di Meno poured pink paint on the statue erected in honor of Montanelli, due to his marriage with a child. In June 2020, a statue of Montanelli in Milan was vandalized by activists in the Black Lives Matter movement. The activist group Rete Studenti Milano described Montanelli as a ‘colonialist’ and argued that he should not be publicly commemorated. Following the vandalism of the Montanelli statue, Rete Studenti Milano and Laboratorio Universitario Metropolitano defaced a street painting dedicated to the child bride by the street artist Ozmo.

== Awards and decorations ==
- Knight Grand Cross of the Order of Merit of the Italian Republic, Rome, 15 December 1995.
- First Class Commander of the Order of the Lion of Finland, 1992.
- Grand Official of the Order of Merit of the Italian Republic, 27 December 1963.
- War Merit Cross, Struga, Macedonia; Santorini, Aegean Sea, Lettigue, April 1941. "A volunteer war correspondent, he fulfilled his delicate task with admirable ability and enthusiasm. He participated in various war actions with the most advanced elements and with them he entered the conquered territories, giving proof of serene courage and contempt of danger."
- Commemorative Medal of Military Operations in East Africa
- War Volunteer Commemorative Medal of Military Operations in East Africa (1935–1936)

== Bibliography ==
- Alessandro Scurani, Montanelli. Pro e contro, Milano, Letture, 1971.
- Gennaro Cesaro, Dossier Montanelli, Napoli, Fausto Fiorentino, 1974.
- Gastone Geron, Montanelli. Il coraggio di dare la notizia, Milano, La Sorgente, 1975.
- Marcello Staglieno, Il Giornale 1974–1980, Milano, Società europea di edizioni, 1980.
- Tommaso Giglio, Un certo Montanelli, Milano, Sperling & Kupfer, 1981.
- Claudio Mauri, Montanelli l'eretico, Milano, SugarCo, 1982.
- Marcello Staglieno, Indro Montanelli, Milano, Sidalm-Comune di Milano, 1982.
- Tullio Ciarrapico (a cura di), Indro Montanelli. Una vita per la cultura. Letteratura: giornalismo, Roma, Ente Fiuggi, 1985.
- Donato Mutarelli, Montanelli visto da vicino, Milano, Ediforum, 1992.
- Ettore Baistrocchi, Lettere a Montanelli, Roma, Palazzotti, 1993.
- Piero Malvolti, Indro Montanelli, Fucecchio, Edizioni dell'Erba, 1993.
- Mario Cervi e Gian Galeazzo Biazzi Vergani, I vent'anni del "Giornale" di Montanelli. 25 giugno 1974 – 12 gennaio 1994, Milano, Rizzoli, 1994. ISBN 88-17-84323-7.
- Giancarlo Mazzuca, Indro Montanelli: la mia "Voce". Storia di un sogno impossibile raccontata da Giancarlo Mazzuca, Milano, Sperling & Kupfer, 1995. ISBN 88-200-1904-3.
- Federico Orlando, Il sabato andavamo ad Arcore. La vera storia, documenti e ragioni, del divorzio tra Berlusconi e Montanelli, Bergamo, Larus, 1995. ISBN 88-7747-954-X.
- Marcello Staglieno, Il Novecento visto da Montanelli: l'eretico della destra italiana, suppl. a "Lo Stato", Roma, 20 gennaio 1998.
- Marco Delpino, a cura di e con Paolo Riceputi, Indro Montanelli: un cittadino scomodo e un'analisi sulla stampa italiana, Santa Margherita Ligure, Tigullio-Bacherontius, 1999.
- Federico Orlando, Fucilate Montanelli. Dall'assalto al «Giornale» alle elezioni del 13 maggio, Roma, Editori Riuniti, 2001. ISBN 88-359-5076-7.
- Marcello Staglieno, Montanelli. Novant'anni controcorrente, Milano, Mondadori, 2001. ISBN 88-04-50481-1.
- Giorgio Soavi, Indro. Due complici che si sono divertiti a vivere e a scrivere, Collezione Il Cammeo n.388, Milano, Longanesi, 2002. ISBN 88-304-2000-X.
- Gian Luca Mazzini, Montanelli mi ha detto. Avventure, aneddoti, ricordi del più grande giornalista italiano, Rimini, Il Cerchio, 2002. ISBN 88-8474-025-8.
- Giorgio Torelli, Il Padreterno e Montanelli, Milano, Ancora, 2003. ISBN 88-514-0090-3.
- Paolo Granzotto, Montanelli, Bologna, il Mulino, 2004. ISBN 88-15-09727-9.
- Marco Travaglio, Montanelli e il Cavaliere. Storia di un grande e di un piccolo uomo, Prefazione di Enzo Biagi, Milano, Garzanti, 2004. ISBN 88-11-60034-0; Nuova edizione ampliata nella Collana Saggi, con un saggio introduttivo inedito dell'Autore, Milano, Garzanti, 2009. ISBN 978-88-11-60088-6.
- Paolo Avanti e Alessandro Frigerio, A cercar la bella destra. I ragazzi di Montanelli, Milano, Mursia, 2005. ISBN 88-425-3406-4.
- Sandro Gerbi e Raffaele Liucci, Lo stregone. La prima vita di Indro Montanelli, Torino, Einaudi, 2006. ISBN 88-06-16578-X.
- Renata Broggini, Passaggio in Svizzera. L'anno nascosto di Indro Montanelli, Milano, Feltrinelli, 2007. ISBN 978-88-07-49054-5.
- Federica Depaolis e Walter Scancarello (a cura di), Indro Montanelli. Bibliografia 1930-2006, Pontedera, Bibliografia e Informazione, 2007. ISBN 978-88-902523-1-0.
- Giancarlo Mazzuca, Testimoni del Novecento, Bologna, Poligrafici Editoriale, 2008.
- Sandro Gerbi e Raffaele Liucci, Montanelli l'anarchico borghese. La seconda vita 1958-2001, Torino, Einaudi, 2009. ISBN 978-88-06-18947-1.
- Giorgio Torelli, Non avrete altro Indro. Montanelli raccontato con nostalgia, Milano, Ancora, 2009. ISBN 978-88-514-0669-1.
- Iacopo Bottazzi, Montanelli Reporter. Da Addis Abeba a Zagabria in viaggio con un grande giornalista, Roma-Reggio Emilia, Aliberti, 2011. ISBN 88-7424-622-6.
- Federica De Paolis, Tra i libri di Indro: percorsi in cerca di una biblioteca d'autore, Pontedera, Bibliografia e Informazione, 2013. ISBN 978-88-907250-6-7.
- Sandro Gerbi e Raffaele Liucci, Indro Montanelli. Una biografia (1909-2001), (nuova ed. aggiornata dei due volumi apparsi per Einaudi), Collana Saggistica, Milano, Hoepli, 2014. ISBN 978-88-203-6352-9.
- Giancarlo Mazzuca, Indro Montanelli. Uno straniero in patria. Prefazione di Roberto Gervaso, Collana Saggi, Cairo Publishing, 2015. ISBN 978-88-605-2603-8.
- Merlo, Salvatore (2016). Fummo giovani soltanto allora. La vita spericolata del giovane Montanelli. Milano: Mondadori. ISBN 978-88-04-66004-0.
- Alberto Mazzuca, Penne al vetriolo. I grandi giornalisti raccontano la prima Repubblica, Bologna, Minerva, 2017. ISBN 978-88-738-1849-6.

Media offices
Preceded by Ernesto Libenzi	Editor in chief of La Domenica del Corriere; 1945–1946	Succeeded by Eligio Possenti
New title Founder	Editor in chief of il Giornale; 1974–1994	Succeeded by Vittorio Feltri
New title Founder	Editor in chief of La Voce; 1994–1995	Newspaper failed
Preceded by Isabella Bossi Fedrigotti	Letters editor of Corriere della Sera; 1995–2001	Succeeded by Paolo Mieli
