= Corriere del Trentino =

Italian newspaper

- Type: Daily newspaper (published from Tuesday to Sunday)
- Format: Broadsheet
- Owner(s): RCS MediaGroup
- Founded: 2003; 22 years ago
- Language: Italian
- Headquarters: Trento, Italy

Corriere del Trentino is an Italian local newspaper owned by RCS MediaGroup and based in Trento, Italy. It was launched in 2003 in Trentino, on the basis of Corriere del Mezzogiorno.

== See also ==
- List of newspapers in Italy
