= La Voce (newspaper) =

Italian newspaper

- Type: Daily newspaper
- Format: Broadsheet
- Editor: Indro Montanelli
- Founded: 22 March 1994
- Ceased publication: 12 April 1995
- Political alignment: Conservatism; Anti-Berlusconism; Pro-Segni Pact
- Language: Italian
- Headquarters: Via Dante, Milan, Italy

The La Voce was an Italian daily newspaper published in Milan from March 1994 to April 1995. It was founded by journalist Indro Montanelli after a disagreement with Silvio Berlusconi, at that time owner of the Il Giornale newspaper of which Montanelli had been the founder and editor in chief after leaving Corriere della Sera. When Berlusconi announced his intention to run at the 1994 Italian general election in January 1994, he expected the paper to give his campaign full support. Although Montanelli's position was somehow aligned with Berlusconi's, he felt that the political career of Berlusconi could erode the editorial freedom and authority of the paper. Despite the initial success, the foundation of a new paper proved to be too much for Montanelli, who was 85 at the time. With sales going down dramatically following Berlusconi's victory, Montanelli was forced to close the paper after less than one year. He would later rejoin Corriere della Sera as a columnist.
