= Anna (magazine) =

Women's magazine in Italy (1984–2013)

- Categories: Women's fashion magazine
- Frequency: Weekly
- Publisher: RCS Periodici
- Founded: 1984
- Final issue: 2013
- Company: RCS Media Group
- Country: Italy
- Based in: Milan
- Language: Italian

Anna was a weekly women's fashion magazine based in Milan, Italy. It was in circulation in 1984 and 2013.

== History and profile ==
The magazine was founded in 1984 on the ashes of the monthly Annabella, a famous magazine closed in the 1980s. The publisher was RCS Periodici, part of RCS MediaGroup. Anna was published on a weekly basis. In 2007 its title was renamed as A. The magazine had many sister publications, including another women's magazine Amica. In 2013 it ceased publication.

== See also ==
List of magazines in Italy
