= Blay (surname) =

Blay is a surname. Notable people with the surname include:

- Andre Blay (1937–2018), American businessman, film producer and studio executive
- David Blay Jr. (born 2003), American football player
- Eddie Blay (1937–2006), Ghanaian boxer
- Eva Alterman Blay (born 1937), Brazilian sociologist and politician
- Freddie Blay (born 1942), Ghanaian lawyer and politician
- George Blay (born 1980), Ghanaian footballer
- J. Benibengor Blay (1915–?), Ghanaian journalist, writer, publisher and politician
- Pep Blay (born 1966), Catalan writer, script writer and music journalist
- Ruth Blay (died 1768), last woman executed in New Hampshire
- Robert Samuel Blay (1901–1979), Ghanaian judge
- Philippe Blay (born 1960), French musicologist

== See also ==
- Blay Whitby, British philosopher and technology ethicist
- Bley
