= Arturo Quintavalle =

Italian art historian

Arturo Carlo Quintavalle (born 1936 in Parma) is an Italian art historian, critic and academic. He was professor of art history at Parma University and founded and for several years headed that university's Centro Studi e Archivio della Comunicazione.

== Life ==
Quintavalle's parents Armando Ottaviano Quintavalle (1894-1967) and Augusta Ghidiglia (1904-1988) were both art historians. During the World War II, his father saved about 9,000 artifacts, sculptures and paintings that formed the collection of the Galleria d'arte di Parma by hiding them in the Castle of Torrechiara.

Quintavalle studied at the University of Pisa, where he was a student of Carlo Ludovico Ragghianti. He majored in Medieval and Modern Art, also displaying great interest in contemporary art and photography and industrial design. In 1968 he was appointed Professor of History of Art at the Parma University, where he founded the Centro studi e archivio della comunicazione, that he would run until 1989 with his wife Gloria Bianchino.

He has written extensively about Wiligelmo and the Parma Baptistery.
From the early 1970s, for about 25 years, he was a culture columnist for the weekly magazine Panorama. He has also contributed for 30 years to Corriere della Sera.

== Selected works ==
- La Cattedrale di Modena (1964–65)
- L'opera sul Correggio (1970)
- Il territorio della fotografia (1979)
- Arte italiana 1960-80, (1984)
- Design: Roberto Sambonet (1993)
- Emilio Tadini, Fabbri, (1994)
- Fratelli Alinari, Fotografi in Firenze: 150 Anni Che Illustrarono Il Mondo (1852-2002)
- Arredi liturgici e architettura, Mondadori Electa (2007)
- Mario Schifano: America Anemica, Skira (2008)
- L’officina Benedetto Antelami della cattedrale di Fidenza, 2020
