= RCS MediaGroup =

Italian publishing group

RCS MediaGroup S.p.A.
- Type: Listed
- Traded as: BIT: RCS; FTSE Italia Mid Cap
- ISIN: IT0003039010
- Industry: Media
- Founded: 1927; 99 years ago (as A. Rizzoli & C.)
- Founder: Angelo Rizzoli
- Headquarters: Via Angelo Rizzoli, 8, Milan, Italy
- Key people: Urbano Cairo (Chairman and CEO)
- Products: Magazines; Newspapers; Radio; Television; Advertising; New Media
- Net income: ▲€85 million (2018)
- Total assets: ▼€1368 million (2015)
- Total equity: ▲€254.0 million (2018)
- Owner: Cairo Communication (59.693%); Mediobanca (9.930%); Diego Della Valle (7.325%); others
- Parent: Cairo Communication
- Website: rcsmediagroup.it
- Footnotes in a consolidated basis

RCS MediaGroup S.p.A. (formerly Rizzoli Editore and Rizzoli-Corriere della Sera), based in Milan and listed on the Italian Stock Exchange, is an international multimedia publishing group that operates in daily newspapers, magazines and books, radio broadcasting, new media and digital and satellite TV. It is also one of the leading operators in the advertisement sales & distribution markets.

== History ==
Entrepreneur Angelo Rizzoli founded A. Rizzoli & C. in 1927. The company initially focused on the press industry, acquiring four national magazines before expanding into publishing. The company underwent multiple restructurings and changes in ownership, notably during the 1980s when two of its executives were implicated in the collapse of Banco Ambrosiano and the illegal Masonic Lodge Propaganda Due – or P2. Following the 1982 death of Roberto Calvi, the group applied for bankruptcy protection and greatly downsized.

In 2016, Cairo Communication acquired the controlling stake of RCS MediaGroup. In the same year, Italian Competition Authority approved the sales of RCS Libri (a.k.a. Rizzoli Libri) from RCS MediaGroup to Arnoldo Mondadori Editore.

=== Timeline ===
The timeline of the company:

- 1927 – Angelo Rizzoli launches publishing activities at his printing company "A. Rizzoli & C."
- 1952 – company was renamed "Rizzoli Editore"
- 1974 – company purchased "Editoriale Corriere della Sera S.a.s.", which publishes the daily newspaper Il Corriere della Sera
- 1976 – company took over management of La Gazzetta dello Sport
- 1984 – Gemina acquired controlling holding of Rizzoli
- 1990 – acquisition of holding in Spanish company Unidad Editorial S.A., the present day holding of which is 96.1%
- 1997 – "Rizzoli-Corriere della Sera" was separated from Gemina’s other industrial activities, which were transferred to the new holding company HdP
- 2000 – acquisition of French publishing house Editions Flammarion
- 2001 – creation of Fondazione Corriere della Sera
- 2002 – acquisition of holding in Dada S.p.A., which at present stands at 46.54%
- 2003 – company was renamed "RCS MediaGroup"
- 2006 – acquisition of first holding in Digicast, which is now a wholly owned subsidiary
- 2007 – acquisition, through Unidad Editorial, of Spanish publishing group Recoletos Grupo de Comunicaciòn
- 2007 – acquisition of 34.6% of Finelco Group
- 2008 – acquisition, through Unidad Editorial, of 100% of VEO Television (already held at 55,4%)
- 2012 – divestiture of Flammarion to Éditions Gallimard
- 2013 – In June 2013, the media group accepted an undisclosed offer from PRS S.r.l. to buy 14 magazines, it had put up for sale as part of its restructuring plan. In July, sold Dada S.p.A.
- 2014 – In September 2014, RCS MediaGroup in association with Playtech launched an online sport betting portal under the brand GazzaBet.
- 2015 – Sold RCS Libri

== Operations ==
RCS MediaGroup's sectors include newspapers, magazines and books, radio broadcasting, the internet, and digital and satellite TV. It also has a division which handles advertising sales & distribution markets across all media divisions. In Italy, the group manages large daily newspapers such as Corriere della Sera, publishes popular magazines including Il Mondo, and a diverse range of school, university, and business publications.

In Spain, through Unedisa, it publishes leading daily newspaper El Mundo. It also has representation in Portugal, the United States, and China. In March 2008, RCS reached an agreement with Global Media Publishing to launch a Russian version of its Sport Week magazine. They also planned to develop a Russian-language website, sportweek.ru, along with additional mobile phone services.

The financial investment division holds interest in the capital of major Italian companies, including Banca Intesa, the internet company Dada, and Pirelli (which holds a complementary cross-holding).

The company employs 5,558 employees.

=== Sectors ===
==== Quotidiani (Newspapers) Sector ====
Quotidiani Sector is the publisher of the group's daily newspapers in Italy and in Spain. The company holds a leadership position in the national daily press in Italy, where it has a 19% market share, and in Spain, with an 18% market share.

Companies

- RCS Sport, a company that organizes the most important cycling events in Italy, including the Giro d'Italia and some of the most prestigious Classics, such as the Milan–San Remo, the Giro di Lombardia and the Tirreno–Adriatico, together with other events linked to summer and winter sports. RCS Sport organises the Milan Marathon and manages the sponsorship rights for the Italy National Football Team. Since 2008, it has also been a partner of the Italy national rugby league team, and has entered the motorsport industry with the indoor supercross format, Superiders.
- Unidad Editorial (96.48%, also present in the periodical sector), the leader in the Spanish daily press and online news through El Mundo, Expansión and Marca.

Newspapers

- Corriere della Sera
  - Corriere dell'Alto Adige (local editions)
  - Corriere di Bergamo
  - Corriere di Bologna
  - Corriere di Brescia
  - Corriere Fiorentino
  - Corriere Milan
  - Corriere Rome
  - Corriere del Mezzogiorno
  - Corriere del Veneto
  - Corriere del Trentino
  - Corriere Turin
- City
- La Gazzetta dello Sport
- El Mundo (in Spain through Unidad Editorial)
- Marca (in Spain through Unidad Editorial)
- Expansión (in Spain through Unidad Editorial)

==== Periodici (Magazines) Sector ====
Periodici Sector publishes the group's magazines. In Italy the company has a market share of about 18%, with a portfolio of more than 30 publications.

Companies

- Sfera Editore
- Pubblibaby
- RCS Multimedia, a new integrated multimedia system that was launched in late 2008.
  - Digicast, a publisher of digital channels, distributed in Italy through SKY Italia.

Magazines

- Abitare
- Amica
- Anna
- Dolce Attesa
- Dove
- Io Donna
- Io e il mio bambino
- Insieme
- Imagine
- Italian Style
- Living
- OGGI
- OGGI Cucino
- Sette
- Sport Week
- Style
- Style Piccoli
- Actualidad Economica
- Fuera De Serie
- Metropoli
- Telva
- Yo Dona

==== Pubblicità (Advertising) Sector ====
Pubblicità Sector is the agency for the acquisition of advertising customers for the group's publications. It is the leading company in Italy for the acquisition of advertising for print media, for which it has a market share of 19%.

Companies

- Blei, a media centre for the international market.
- Unidad Editorial Publicidad
- Novomedia

==== Other ====
- m-dis (45%)
- Agenzia Giornalistica RCS, a news agency, which provides news and editorial content on radio, television and regional Italian web sites.

=== Former sectors ===
- Finelco
- RaiSat (5%)

==== RCS Libri ====
RCS Libri runs the group's activities in the book publishing sector. Its structure comprises four divisions: RCS Libri Italia, RCS Education, RCS Partworks, and Rizzoli USA. The whole division was sold to Arnoldo Mondadori Editore, with some imprints were sold to other investors. After the transaction, RCS Libri was renamed to Rizzoli Libri. It owned the rights to use the brand Rizzoli in book publishing only. The partworks division was sold in 2011.

Publishing houses

- Adelphi Edizioni (sold to Roberto Calasso)
- Archinto (sold to Rosellina Archinto)
- Bompiani (sold to Mondadori; re-sold to Giunti Editore)
- Etas (sold to Mondadori)
- Fabbri Editori (sold to Mondadori)
  - Sonzogno
- Rizzoli Lizard (sold to Mondadori)
- Marsilio Editori (sold to Mondadori; re-sold to De Michelis family)
- Biblioteca Universale Rizzoli (BUR; sold to Mondadori)
- Skira (sold)
- Rizzoli International Publications (sold to Mondadori)
  - Rizzoli Bookstore
  - Universe
- Rizzoli-Longanesi (50%, in joint venture with Mauri Spagnol Group)

== Ownership ==
On 26 January 2005, the shareholders which control 63.527% of ordinary share capital came to a shareholders' agreement freezing, the participants from selling or trading their holdings. On 14 March 2008, the pact agreed to extend their agreement for another three years until 2011. Italmobiliare, a company in the pact, acquired 2.332% stake of RCS from their subsidiary Italcementi in 2010, making the stake held by Italmobiliare increased to 7.465%. Italmobiliare did not excised all of their rights in the capital increase, making the company owned just 3.0042% of the share capital and 3.7469% ordinary shares of RCS.

In 2016, Urbano Cairo, via Cairo Communication, successfully completed a hostile takeover of RCS MediaGroup. However, Mediobanca, Unipol, Pirelli, Diego Della Valle and a private equity fund International Acquisitions Holding formed a new shareholders pact that opposed to Cairo; their offer to the public was lost to the offer from Cairo.

Earlier that year, Fiat Chrysler Automobiles (FCA), a company of the 2008 pact, distributed the shares of RCS the company owns (16.7% of the share capital), to the shareholders of FCA, making the shareholders of FCA freely decided to sell the shares of RCS to either factions or kept the shares as their own investments; Exor, the major shareholder of FCA, sold the stake of RCS immediately.

Major shareholders of RCS MediaGroup with >2% stake

As of 26 September 2016

- consortium of Cairo Communication and U.T. Communications (Urbano Cairo) 59.831%
- Mediobanca 9.930%
- consortium of Diego Della Valle & C. S.r.l. and DI. VI. Finanziaria di Diego Della Valle & C. S.r.l. (Diego Della Valle) 7.325%
- consortium of UnipolSai and Unipol (Finsoe) 4.601%
- Pirelli (State-owned Assets Supervision and Administration Commission of the State Council of China) 4.443%
