= Corriere del Mezzogiorno =

Italian newspaper

- Type: Daily newspaper
- Format: Broadsheet
- Owner(s): RCS MediaGroup
- Founded: 1997
- Language: Italian
- Headquarters: Naples, Italy
- Website: http://corrieredelmezzogiorno.corriere.it

Corriere del Mezzogiorno (lit. 'Courier of the Mezzogiorno') is an Italian local newspaper owned by RCS MediaGroup and based in Naples, Italy, with editorial offices in all over southern Italy (Mezzogiorno). It was launched in 1997 in Campania to handle the growing competition with la Repubblica. The Apulian edition was launched in 2002.

In the year 2000 the newspaper had a circulation of 10.9 million copies, amounting to 0.31% of the total national newspaper circulation, and 3.53% in the Southern area. In 2022, the circulation was 2.3 million copies, 0.25% of the national total.

== See also ==
- List of newspapers in Italy
