= Gianni Mazzocchi =

Italian publisher

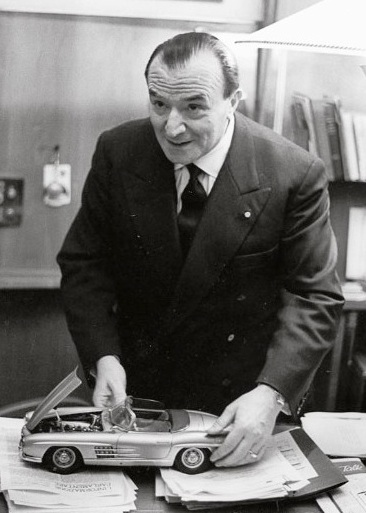
- Born: 18 November 1906; Ascoli Piceno, Marche, Italy
- Died: 24 October 1984 (aged 77); Milan, Lombardy, Italy
- Occupations: Print-media baron, especially of monthly magazines (proprietor / editor / journalist)
- Spouse: Emma Robbutti (-1978)
- Children: Maria Grazia Mazzocchi; Giovanna Mazzocchi Bordone

Gianni Mazzocchi (18 November 1906 – 24 October 1984) was an Italian magazine editor-proprietor, originally from Marche, with an unusual degree of energy and entrepreneurial flair; he moved north to Milan and became a leading print-media magnate. He founded more than fifteen national magazines including several, such as Il Mondo, L'Europeo, and Quattroruote, that continued to feature prominently on the nation's news stands long after his death.

== Biography ==
=== Provenance and early years ===
Gianni Mazzocchi was born on the same day as Alec Issigonis. He was born in Ascoli Piceno, a regional capital across the mountains to the north-east of Rome. His father died in 1933, when he was 27. The family had become prosperous over the years through the silk industry. His father had at one stage been a breeder of silk worms. His grand parents had died in the postwar flu pandemic. Before his father died the family had been destroyed: Gianni's mother was in poor health and his sister was "in and out of nursing homes". The family business had, in the words of one source, been "stolen" by a clever trickster, the father of one of Gianni Mazzocchi's school contemporaries. Only his father's gambling debts remained.

On leaving school he won a scholarship to study Jurisprudence at Rome. He then broke off his studies and moved to Milan in 1927, partly in response to his family's intensifying financial difficulties and partly in response to a conviction that the job opportunities in Lombardy would be much better than those on offer in Central Italy. He later recalled that "the only way to get out was to go north ... I had 640 lire in my pocket and forty thousand in debts. I had this crazy idea to come to Milan" (Note: "L'unico modo per uscirne fu andare al nord, ... avevo 640 lire in tasca e quarantamila lire di debiti. Ho fatto la pazzia di venire a Milano.") Very soon after arriving in Milan he met Father Giovanni Semeria who offered him, initially, work as a typist in connection with publishing and book trading work undertaken to support the "Opera nazionale per il Mezzogiorno d'Italia", a church-backed organisation devoted to running a network of orphanages and other institutions designed to alleviate the extreme poverty that was a feature of southern Italy. The work enabled Gianni Mazzocchi quickly to become involved with the city's network of publishers and book traders. In his typing job he immediately drew attention to himself through his precision and accuracy, and he was soon offered a permanent position worth 600 lire a month: he was able to start paying off his debts.

=== "Domus" ===
It was also through Father Semeria that Mazzocchi met Gio Ponti, the polymath designer-architect who had founded the magazine Domus in 1928. In the summer of 1929, learning that the original publishers of Domus were about to close down the magazine, Ponti invited Mazzocchi, whose administrative abilities he had come to admire, to take over responsibility for its publication. A team of backers drawn from leading Milanese industrialists and cultural figures, including Ponti himself, was assembled: under the management of Gianni Mazzocchi a new company, "S.a. Editoriale Domus", was launched on 11 July 1929. Although their working relationship was often stormy, Ponti and Mazzocchi formed a management team that was effective and remarkably long lasting, with Ponti taking responsibility for artistic directorship and Mazzocchi concentrating on other editorial and management aspects of the magazine publication business. In some ways Domus provided a template which other magazines would follow during the ensuing decades. By 1931 Mazzocchi owned 75% of the business and he became sole proprietor in 1940, by when there was a small stable of magazines. During the early years the board of directors also included Rafaele Contu, a senior officer in the merchant navy. Contu was a fervent Fascist, but he was nevertheless seen as a man of refined intellect. As a former director of L'Unione Sarda (a daily newspaper), a co-director of Sapere (a magazine) and a former associate of Giuseppe Ungaretti, he came with excellent connections in the Milanese media and publishing world, and his known political leanings were not disadvantageous to the business now that Italy had become a one-party dictatorship. After January 1940, as sole owner of the business, Mazzocchi was able to undertake executive duties on his own, although Contu remained a member of the editorial management team along with Alfonso Gatto and Emilio Ceretti.

In 1933 the company entered the market for women's magazines with the launch of "File" (literally, "Threads"), a monthly publication specialising in needlework directed by Emilia "Bebe" Kuster Rosselli and Emma Robbutti (the future Sra. Mazzocchi). The suitability of certain types of thread for children's clothes, types of wool and "fashion threads" were among the subjects addressed. By combining topics involving traditionally female work with artistic themes, "File", effectively opened up a new but related niche in the tradition of "Domus" which set the work involved in design and architecture in an arts-driven context. During the later 1930s and the war years that followed, the management structure of the "S.a. Editoriale Domus" remained a somewhat movable feast, but Mazzocchi's was the dominating presence throughout. In 1934, continuing with themes devoted to discussion and dissemination of new ideas in domestic and industrial "home design", the group acquired "La Casa Bella" (literally, "The Beautiful House") in 1934. The existing editor, Giuseppe Pagano, stayed on till 1943. (The title was renamed "Casabella" in 1938.)

=== "Panorama" ===
Buoyed by the success of the monthly magazines, in November 1935 Mazzocchi began to publish a series of books written by leading literary figures of the time, but aimed at a mass market. He created the brand "Panorama" for the purpose. Featured authors included Enrico Falqui, Gianna Manzini, Massimo Bontempelli and Alfonso Gatto. Another was the young journalist Indro Montanelli who, inspired by Rudyard Kipling and his advocacy of the white man's civilising mission, had volunteered for military service in support of Mussolini's invasion of Abyssinia. Montenelli's first book, which resulted from this, was published in the "Panorama" series under the title "XX Battaglione Eritreo. Il primo romanzo e le lettere inedite dal fronte africano". Intriguingly, "XX Battaglione Eritreo" was published in 1936 without the author's knowledge. Mazzocchi managed to get hold of diary pages and letters that the author had sent home to his father and, with virtually no need to adapt the resulting text, published these as a book.

In 1939, with approximately 15 titles published, Mazzocchi withdrew the business from the book market, deciding it was insufficiently profitable. The "Panorama" brand was retained and redeployed, however, being applied to what was at that stage issued as a fortnightly "encyclopaedia of current events". It was closed down on 12 September 1940, by order of the Ministry of Popular Culture which had found an article contributed by Indro Montanelli "defeatist". (Note: After the fall of fascism, "Panorama" was revived by another publisher, and in 2018 continues to grace Italian news-stands as a weekly news-magazine.)

=== The later war years and beyond ===
His experience with "Panorama" in 1940 seems to have warned Mazzocchi away from too much focus in his publications on politics and current affairs, and during the postwar period he avoided moving too far away from the moderate liberal-radical milieu which, after Mussolini, became the political mainstream and in which, as businessman and intellectual, he was in any case broadly comfortable. In 1945 the respected journalist-politician Leo Valiani (whose own antifascist credentials were beyond impeccable) offered him the editorship of L'Italia libera, which had originated in 1943 as an illegal underground publication, but which was reinvented after the war, appearing on 26 April 1945 as a mainstream daily newspaper of the liberal centre-left. During 1945-47 L'Italia libera had a somewhat rocky existence and Mazzocchi's experience as the editor of a major daily newspaper, although no doubt valuable, was relatively brief. By the time L'Italia libera ceased to publish he had already become editor of L'Europeo, which he had designed with Arrigo Benedetti while Milan was still under American occupation, and which had been launched in November 1945 with an editorial by Bertrand Russell.

=== "L'Europeo" ===
L'Europeo was the first of the major postwar rotogravure-produced weekly news magazines. Key to the success of L'Europeo was Mazzocchi's preparation: he assembled a number of journalists some of whom were already well-known and the rest of whom quickly made their mark. These included Emilio Cecchi, Alberto Moravia, Raul Radice, Domenico Bartoli, Emilio Radius, Tommaso Besozzi and a youthful Camilla Cederna along with Mazzocchi's co-founder, Arrigo Benedetti himself. There was also a distinguished Roman contingent that included Mario Pannunzio, Vittorio Gorresio and Alberto Moravia.

As Italy entered a period of rapid postwar economic recovery, L'Europeo succeeded with a growing readership among the intellectual elite. At the end of 1952 there was a sudden financial crisis in the west, attributed by some sources to military developments in Korea, however. One effect was a massive and sudden surge in the price of paper which plunged L'Europeo into financial crisis. Mazzocchi was forced to sell it to (indirectly) Angelo Rizzoli, a rival.

=== "Il Mondo" ===
Il Mondo, co-founded in February 1949, has been described as "a jewel in the crown" of Italian weekly political journals. The magazine was published in Rome and it was Mario Pannunzio who became its editor. Italian politics had settled by this time into two principal blocks, focused respectively around the Communist Party (believed by its critics to be excessively influenced by Moscow) and around the Christian Democratic parties and groupings. Il Mondo distanced itself from both, taking a consciously secularist line on the issues of the day. In 1956 Mazzocchi surrendered control of Il Mondo (without payment passing in either direction) to Nicolò Carandini and Adriano Olivetti, followinging disagreements apparently of a political nature with the editor.

=== "Stile industria" and "Quattroruote" ===
In 1954 Mazzocchi, founded "Stile industria", a magazine which under the direction of Alberto Rosselli (1921-1976) endured till 1963. Then in 1956 he launched Quattroruote, a car/motor magazine which he directed till 1984. The publication still appears each month across (and beyond) Italy. A few months later he purchased L'Auto Italiana, a motor magazine which came with a vast historical archive covering motoring, motorcycling, motorboat racing and aviation.

Blessed with an enthusiastic approach to life, Mazzocchi had a passion for cars. He saw them as vital instruments of personal and social emancipation. For him, cars epitomised individual freedom and independence. In the editorial of the first edition of Quattroruote, published as Italy's post-war boom in car ownership was accelerating, he wrote, "We want the car to become the means through which everyone will live better". (Note: "Vogliamo che l'auto diventi per tutti un mezzo per vivere meglio".) He also expressed his enthusiasm as a collector of cars, though sources are vague over how many he had at any one time. In the words of one source, the cars "came and went. He tried them, bought them, gave them away ...". He was particularly proud of his first Citroën DS. He loved his sports cars, especially the Alfa Romeos, and was also a Ferrari enthusiast.

Mazzocchi used Quattroruote to pursue what some saw as very personal campaigns, though for many readers his campaigning was very much in the public interest. He argued powerfully and consistently for the construction of the Autostrada del Sole ("A1 highway/motorway") linking Milan to Naples via Bologna and Rome "which others considered impossible or useless". (Note: The Autostrada sections from Milan to Bologna and from Capua to Naples had been completed by the end of 1959, though motorists expecting an unbroken Autostrada connection from Milan to Naples would have to wait another five years.) (Once the authorities agreed the specifications and the first sections of the Autostrada were constructed, he used Quattroruote to complain with equal passion that the width specified for the Autostrada's lanes was insufficient.) He campaigned fiercely for the 1959 abolition of the so-called "Suez crisis fuel surcharge". As cruising speeds increased he campaigned for an end to the widespread default design for main roads in Italy whereby most were constructed with three lanes, the outer two of which were reserved for cars travelling in a single direction, while between them the central lane was marked by the line painters to permit overtaking by vehicles travelling in either direction at the same time. He fought for the mandatory fitting of rear fog lights.

=== "Quattrosoldi" ===
Another important magazine launch came in 1961 with "Quattrosoldi". Its first editor in chief was Oreste del Buono. Reflecting the rapid rise in discretionary consumer spending of the later 1950s and early 1960s, the magazine organised comparative surveys of consumer goods and published the results. It dealt seriously with ecological issues that would not become mainstream in European media for another thirty or forty years. Mazzocchi's campaigning instincts were also apparent from the publication's concern with the quality of public water supplies and controls on water pollution. However, because of the need to fund the many consumer tests of items ranging from clothes and washing machines to pens, shirts and food, the publication was expensive to run. In the aftermath of the 1973 oil crisis consumer incomes were badly squeezed and it became apparent that Italian magazine buyers were not willing to pay a cover price that would cover the publication's operating costs. Mazzocchi sold "Quattrosoldi" in 1974.

=== Kidnap ===
Gianni Mazzocchi had married one of his senior editor-directors, Emma Robbutti. The couples' two daughters were born in approximately 1944 and 1947.

The 1970s were scarred, especially in Italy and West Germany, by a succession of widely reported terrorist atrocities. Some of those attacks were overtly political while others were more simply "criminal" in nature. It was not always clear which were which. Wealthy high-profile businessmen and their families were favourite targets.

In May 1978 the Mazzocchis' elder daughter, Maria Grazia Mazzocchi, by now aged 33 and the mother of two sons aged 5 and 9, left her apartment at 20.40 to meet her friend, the journalist Anna Querd, for dinner. Her husband was away in America, and she had spent the day, as usual, working in her father's editorial office building. Slightly after midnight she left her friend and headed home in her car. She was not seen again for nearly two months. The morning after her disappearance police found her car parked along the street from her apartment. There was no sign of any struggle. Rumours surfaced that her parents had received a telephone call from kidnappers: the rumours were denied. Elsewhere it was reported on 26 May 1978 that the extortionists had demanded a ransom of three billion lire. Maria Grazia Mazzocchi was held for slightly more than two months and released on 28 July 1978 to be greeted by press speculation that her father had been forced to sell Quattroruote in order to raise the funds necessary to purchase his daughter's release. (It seems he had not, though raising one and a half billion lire to buy off the kidnappers had not been easy.) Her mother Emma died almost immediately after the daughter's release, having been destroyed, according to sources, by the experience of the kidnapping. Gianni Mazzocchi commented ruefully, "Perhaps I was a lousy husband, but certainly I'm a terrible widower. I don't find myself any more". (Note: "Forse sono stato un cattivo marito, ma certamente sono un pessimo vedovo. Non mi ritrovo più.")

=== Final years ===
By the time he died six years later Gianni Mazzocchi had lost much of his energy, but none of his mental strength. The transfer of the business and its fourteen titles to his younger (and herself widowed since the age of 35) daughter, Giovanna Mazzocchi Bordone, had already taken place. She showed every sign of having inherited her father's skills in business administration. The elder daughter, a professional journalist by profession, was for many years the hands-on president of the Domus Academy (though it has subsequently been sold).

On 26 October 1984 the funeral procession set off from the family home in Milan to the family burial plot at Gignese on the shores of Lake Maggiore. The letters and messages of condolence received by Gianni Mazzocchi's family included a telegramme from President Pertini.
