= Bruzzaniti 'ndrina =

- Founded: 1980s
- Founding location: Africo, Calabria, Italy
- Years active: 1980s-present
- Territory: Africo in Calabria; Milan in Lombardy.
- Ethnicity: Calabrians
- Criminal activities: Drug trafficking, money laundering, extortion, political corruption, murder
- Allies: Morabito 'ndrina Palamara 'ndrina South American drug cartels

The Bruzzaniti 'ndrina is a clan of the 'Ndrangheta, a criminal and mafia-type organisation in Calabria, Italy. The 'ndrina is based in Africo, located in the Locride area, but has a strong presence in Lombardy, in particular in Milan. They are historically allied to the Morabito and Palamara 'ndrine, both also from Africo.

== History ==
The Bruzzanti 'ndrina is heavily involved in international drug trafficking, extortion, and infiltration of public contracts, often operating in alliance with the Morabito and Palamara 'ndrine. The group has been the subject of multiple large-scale anti-mafia investigations, which have led to numerous arrests and the seizure of large quantities of cocaine trafficked from South America through Europe. In addition to their historic presence in Africo, authorities have documented the 'ndrina's strong presence in Northern Italy, in particular in Milan, and its connections to public officials, professionals, and infiltration into local businesses, construction projects, and public tenders.

Their activities have also included the manipulation of contracts related to major infrastructure projects in Calabria, including the Strada statale 106 Jonica, and the laundering of criminal proceeds through legitimate businesses. According to reports, the Bruzzaniti are also involved in drug trafficking schemes with the Camorra's Casalesi clan. Over the years, millions of euros in assets have been seized from key figures of the group.

A prominent member, Bartolo Bruzzaniti, described by prosecutors as a figure of "absolute criminal importance", was arrested in Jounieh, Lebanon, in 2023 after years on the run. He was wanted by four Italian prosecutors and had previously evaded capture during Operation Levante, which targeted international drug trafficking linked to the 'Ndrangheta. Investigations revealed he had helped finance the fugitive life of Rocco Morabito, a major cocaine broker also from Africo, and member of the Morabito 'ndrina. Bartolo Bruzzaniti reportedly owned a luxury restaurant in Lebanon, where he was ultimately captured, and had also established ties with Raffaele Imperiale, a prominent international drug trafficker affiliated with the Camorra, who is now a cooperating witness in Italy.
