= Rosario Romeo =

Italian historian and politician (1924–1987)

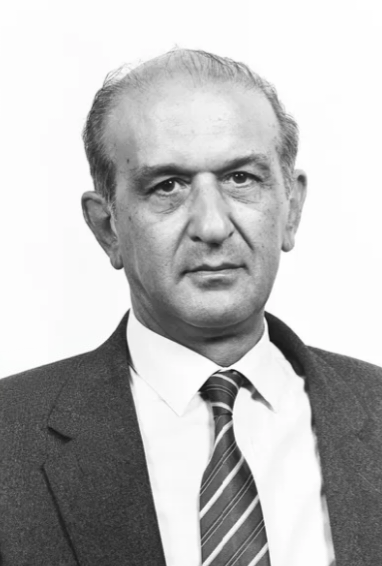
- Born: 11 October 1924; Giarre, Kingdom of Italy
- Died: 16 March 1987 (aged 62); Rome, Italy
- Occupations: Historian; Writer; Politician

Rosario Romeo (11 October 1924 – 16 March 1987) was a leading historian of the Italian Risorgimento and of Italian modern history more generally. His best-known work is probably the wide-ranging and substantial (3 volume) biography of Cavour, of which the third volume appeared only in 1984, following a gestation period, according to at least one source, of nearly thirty years.

Romeo also became a politician, sitting as a member of the Italian Republican Party in the European Parliament between 1984 and his death in 1987.

== Life ==
Rosario Romeo was born in Giarre, a small town on the eastern coast of Sicily. His passion for History was triggered when he was 14 and he read "Il Medioevo" ("The Middle Ages") by Gioacchino Volpe. He studied at the University of Catania under the historian-politician Gioacchino Volpe and the historian Nino Valeri, graduating in 1947 with a dissertation on the Risorgimento in Sicily. In 1947 he won a scholarship awarded by the newly established Naples based Italian Historical Institute (Istituto italiano per gli studi storici) and was thereby enabled to develop his university dissertation into his first book. After this the Institute's president, Federico Chabod, invited Rosario to collaborate on the Italian Dictionary of National Biography, then as now a "work in progress". Romeo then moved to Naples, accepting an appointment as secretary of the Historical Institute in 1953, staying in Naples till 1956.

He took a history professorship at Messina where in 1956, still aged only 31, he was immediately elected head of the History Faculty. In 1962 Rosario Romeo took a position as Professor of Modern History at Rome University, working initially in the Faculty of Education, and transferring later to the Humanities Faculty. In 1977 he became a professor at the European University Institute in Florence where he stayed for most of 1978. Back in Rome, in November 1978 he was appointed rector/provost of the "Guido Carli" Free International University for Social Studies (LUISS): he stayed at the LUISS till 1984.

Rosario Romero was often seen as a conservative liberal historian, as a young professor refuting Gramsci's Marxist reading of the Risorgimento, and more recently robustly unimpressed by Mack Smith's version of the same events. He remained staunchly anti-communist in his politics. In the sometimes fevered political context of Italian historiography, none of this was enough to prevent the maverick academic journalist Panfilo Gentile from (somewhat implausibly) describing Rosario's own 1950 book on the Risorgimento in Sicily as a Marxist work. In a well ventilated controversy involving Renzo De Felice, in 1968 Romeo was instrumental in obtaining for De Felice a professorship at Salerno, and in subsequent years he vigorously defended De Felice when the latter's monumental biography of Mussolini drew charges of (pro-Fascist) revisionism from Leo Valiani (and others).

He acted as the general editor for the ten-volume Storia della Sicilia, published by the Società editrice Storia di Napoli e della Sicilia between 1977 and 1981.

In 1986 Rosario Romeo was appointed a member of the Lincean Academy (Accademia dei Lincei).

On the political front, in 1984 Rosario Romeo's name was on the candidate list of the then Italian Liberal Party for the 1984 election to the European Parliament: when the votes had been cast his name appeared high enough up on the party list, and his party had won sufficient votes, for him to have been elected. Within the parliament he was elected vice-president of the Liberal and Democratic parliamentary group and of the Liberal and Democratic Reformist parliamentary group which replaced it at the end of 1985. He also served between 1984 and 1987 as a member of the parliamentary committee for Regional Policy and Regional Planning, and between January and March 1987 as a member of the parliamentary committee on Institutional Affairs (on which he had been sometimes co-opted as a substitute member since 1984).

Rosario Romeo died on 16 March 1987 in Rome. He was 62.
