= Palamara 'ndrina =

- Founded: 1980s
- Founder: Bruno Palamara
- Founding location: Africo, Calabria, Italy
- Years active: 1980s-present
- Territory: Africo, Brancaleone, and Bruzzano Zeffirio in Calabria; Ramifications in Central and Northern Italy, Germany, Netherlands and Belgium.
- Ethnicity: Calabrians
- Criminal activities: Drug trafficking, money laundering, extortion, political corruption, murder
- Allies: Morabito 'ndrina Bruzzaniti 'ndrina South American drug cartels

The Palamara 'ndrina is a clan of the 'Ndrangheta, a criminal and mafia-type organisation in Calabria, Italy. The 'ndrina is based in Africo, located in the Locride area.

The 'ndrina is historically allied to the Morabito and Bruzzaniti 'ndrine and their activities range from drug trafficking and manipulation of public contracts to controlling the supply of concrete and hiring for public works. Their influence extends further into sectors such as the restaurant industry and real estate, particularly in urban centers from Rome to Northern Italy. Abroad, the 'ndrina has ramifications in Germany, Belgium, and the Netherlands.

== History ==
The Palamara ’ndrina originated in the city of Africo in the Locride area, where it shares the leadership of the region alongside the Morabito and Bruzzaniti 'ndrine. Traditionally involved in drug trafficking, extortion, and local election control, this 'ndrina is regarded as one of the most influential in the entire province of Reggio Calabria. The group has been at the center of major international anti-drug operations, such as the “Buena Ventura” operation, which dismantled cocaine import routes from Colombia to the Italian cities of Milan, Bologna, Naples, and Pescara. The investigation named key figures from the Palamara and Morabito 'ndrine, highlighting their well-established connections with South American drug cartels.

In 2012, in the investigation known as "Bellulavuru 2", the Palamara 'ndrina was among the 'Ndrangheta clans identified as having infiltrated public construction works in Calabria, particularly on the Palizzi bypass project along the strada statale 106 Jonica. The 'ndrina, along with the Morabito, Bruzzaniti, Vadalà, Maisano, Rodà, and Talia 'ndrine, allegedly divided up contracts and profits related to the project. The Palamaras were involved in the control over key aspects of the construction process, including concrete supply, earthmoving, cleaning services, and even office supplies. Investigators found that Condotte d’Acqua, the construction company in charge, bypassed market investigations and awarded subcontracts in an irregular manner, aiming to avoid conflicts with the 'ndrina. Evidence shows that the Palamaras, together with the Morabitos, were part of an agreement to split a €15 million concrete supply contract between two companies, D’Agui beton srl and IMC di Stilo Cosantino, both considered controlled by the 'Ndrangheta. This division of resources was reportedly facilitated by Condotte, which was aware of the organization's power and influence in the area.

In July 2014, Bruno Palamara, the head of the 'ndrina, was arrested by Italy’s Central Operations Service and the Reggio Calabria police. He had been a fugitive since February 2013, wanted on charges of international drug trafficking. Palamara was apprehended on the Salerno-Reggio Calabria highway, near Sala Consilina, while traveling in an Audi A4 driven by Giuseppe Staiti, who was also arrested for aiding and abetting. Upon being stopped, Palamara attempted to conceal his identity by presenting a forged ID, but was recognized by the police, who were conducting a targeted operation based on detailed intelligence about his recent movements.

In 2017, the investigation “Cumps-Banco Nuovo” has unveiled the significant influence of the Palamara and Morabito 'ndrine in the Calabrian towns of Africo, Brancaleone, and Bruzzano Zeffirio. The Palamaras and Morabitos continue to exert control over public contracts and local administration through intimidation and corruption. Young members, known as “cumps” (which comes from the Italian word “compare” meaning close friend or companion), have aggressively asserted dominance over public works, including essential infrastructure projects, often resorting to violent and audacious tactics such as storming municipal meetings. The operation also exposed the complicity of public officials, including Domenico Vitale, head of the technical office in Brancaleone, who (it is claimed) facilitated criminal demands for permits and authorizations. Prosecutors emphasized the evolving relationship between the ’ndrangheta and public administration, highlighting a strategic integration of officials within criminal structures to sustain their power and influence.
