= Vittorio Gorresio =

Italian writer and journalist (1910–1982)

- Born: 18 July 1910; Modena, Emilia-Romagna, Italy
- Died: 17 December 1982 (aged 72); Rome, Italy
- Occupations: Political journalist commentator editor essayist
- Political party: none
- Spouse: Sandra Bolis
- Parent(s): Marco Gorresio; Teresa Silvestro

Vittorio Gorresio (18 July 1910 – 17 December 1982) was an Italian journalist, commentator, and essayist.

== Biography ==
=== Provenance and early years ===
Vittorio Gorresio was born in Modena. His parents, General Marco Gorresio and Teresa Silvestro/Gorresio, were both products of long-established Piedmontese army families from, respectively, Cuneo and Mondovì. The Gorresios would not have been considered particularly wealthy, but the couple and their children were nevertheless able to live reasonably on Marco Gorresio's army salary. The family backgrounds of the two parents may have appeared very similar to outsiders, but there were differences of nuance that surfaced in differing attitudes to the great international question of Vittorio's early childhood, of whether or not Italy should engage militarily in the First World War. Marco Gorresio, a career soldier from a strongly Catholic pro-Giolitti family, opposed military intervention. The Silvestros were a little more traditionalist and conservative: Teresa Silvestro/Gorresio, like her father, favoured the interventionist position.

The third of his parents' four children, Vittorio spent the first ten years of his life growing up in Cuneo, a mid-sized and administratively important town in the west of Piedmont. He would look back on those years as happy ones. There were two brothers, Umberto and Carlo, and a sister, Mamiani. Due to his father's work, the family relocated to Rome in 1920. Here he attended the Ginnasio Terenzio Mamiani (secondary school) till 1925, when the family moved for a year to Zara (Dalmatia). The family then returned to Rome where in 1928 Vittorio Gorresio successfully concluded his school career. His brothers had by this time decided to follow their father into the army, but Vittorio had other ideas, so he enrolled at university as a law student. He graduated in 1932. Family finances being stretched at the time, in parallel with his studies he took a job with the city government (con "la III ripartizione del Governatorato di Roma").

=== Career options ===
He appears to have been planning to become a diplomat, but this was financially impossible, so he fell back on journalism. Both career options were attractive because they seemed to offer the opportunity to "travel the world". He began by sending articles to a wide range of newspapers and succeeded in having some of his work published. Looking back on this period, he would later recall that he had written about "anything and everything ... in a disorderly and disparate way ... but certainly not in a superficial manner". It is clear from the articles that he had published during these years that he approached his writing with a particular appreciation and fascination for History.

=== Journalist ===
In 1932 he undertook his military service, serving as a junior officer at the Bra Artillery School (near Cuneo). Graduating the same year, he took a staff position with "L'Azione coloniale", a weekly political journal that operated under the personal direction of its proprietor, Marco Pomilio. At the same time he continued to write for other publications, and to build up a network of contacts and friends among the journalists based in Rome. During this period he also became director of another weekly (and evidently short-lived) publication, "L'Eco del mondo e Storia".

He used "L'Eco del mondo e Storia" to publish the initial results of his research into Gioacchino Murat of Naples. Subject to various interruptions, and without ever reaching a final set of conclusions or producing a substantive biography, Gorresio would continue to research Marat practically for the rest of his life. He also published two little books: "Questa Francia" (This France, 1934) was an impressionistic compilation based on a visit lasting around twenty days. "I giovani d'Europa" ("Europe's young people", 1936) was a somewhat idiosyncratic review of what young people were thinking. In later years he would view these early literary efforts with evident embarrassment, describing them as "venal sins of [his] youth".

=== Il Messaggero ===
In 1936 Gorresio was appointed a contributing editor to Il Messaggero, a mass-circulation daily newspaper published in Rome. (Note: The second half of the 1930s, which represented a particularly eventful period in Gorresio's life, is beautifully described by Gorresio himself in "La vita ingenua", an autobiographical novel published in 1980, winning that year's Strega Prize.) The appointment was based on a recommendation by the newspaper's editor-in-chief, Mario Missiroli. It is possible that the recommendation was not wholly disinterested. Missiroli seems to have been trying to ingratiate himself with sources at the Ministry for War, in which Marco Gorresio (1878–), Vittorio's father, having been promoted to a position as an office-bound army general, by now occupied a position of significant influence. The appointment gave Vittorio Gorresio his first experience as a member of the editorial board of a mass-circulation daily newspaper: it was an important and formative period for him on several different levels. The newspaper's overall director was Francesco Malgeri, who had been called in in 1932 to arrest an alarming decline in circulation. He had successfully re-invigorated Messaggero, recruiting a team of top journalists, starting with Missiroli. Malgeri was a committed Fascist but a genial senior colleague, who himself was an excellent journalist. Working at Il Messaggero meant working with some of the leading establishment journalists of the age, such as Giovanni Ansaldo and Leo Longanesi: Longanesi was a frequent presence at editorial meetings. A colleague who became a particular friend was Sandro De Feo.

=== Abyssinia ===
Later that year, in November, Gorresio set off for Abyssinia (the Empire of Ethiopia), now designated as travelling editor. His mission was to report on what was being presented in Rome as the Italian conquest of the region. He stayed till February 1937. His reports were characteristically lucid and effortlessly authoritative, even if they contained judgements which many in Rome might have found contentious. His first impressions, on arriving in Abyssinia, were only reinforced during the three months of his stay, and his reports were consistent. Far from being the creators of a heroic new empire, the Italian in Ethiopia seemed to be behaving like emigrants through the ages anywhere else.

=== Second World War ===
Unsurprisingly, Gorresio's contributions to the Second Italo-Ethiopian War were not welcomed by the Fascist censors. The relationship that emerged between the journalist and the media regulators never became one of uncompromising confrontation, however. What emerged, rather, was a deep structural incompatibility, which came to the fore each time Gorresio found himself reporting on a matter of major political consequence. In many ways, this raised his profile, enhanced his reputation and seems to have resulted in his being selected to travel to a succession of emerging news hotspots. In September 1939, the French government declared war on Germany and Gorresio was sent to report from Paris. In June 1940, when Italy entered the war against France, he was sent to report on developments at the great naval base of Taranto, where he embarked aboard the battleship Duilio.

Life as a war reporter was not without its risks, both personal and professional. During the summer of 1941 Gorresio was suddenly recalled from Berlin where he had been reporting on the diplomat-politician Dino Alfieri. It later emerged that he had been denounced by an (unnamed) colleague, who had levelled the accusation that he was "in the pay of the French", and had been mandated by his alleged paymasters to discredit Joseph Goebbels in the eyes of the Italian government. The police investigation which followed completely exonerated Gorresio, but by that time he had been dismissed from his job with Il Messaggero.

Almost immediately he joined Il Popolo di Roma, a daily newspaper with close connections to Foreign Minister Ciano. Ciano had been married to the leader's daughter since 1930, but Il Popolo nevertheless employed a number of journalists, such as Corrado Alvaro and Ercole Patti, who were known anti-fascists. Neither Alvaro nor Patti were overtly political journalists, however, and after a few months Gorresio was obliged to quit the news desk when he was conscripted for military service and promoted to the rank of captain. Throughout 1942 he attended the artillery school at Treviso, undertaking the necessary training for taking command of an anti-aircraft battery planned for Genoa. An unwelcome "baptism of fire" followed in October and November when the city was hit by a succession of deadly Allied air raids.

The king's dismissal of Mussolini on 25 June 1943 brought about an abrupt change in the political weather in Rome, where his old colleague Corrado Alvaro suddenly emerged as managing director at Il Popolo di Roma and summoned Gorresio back to take over as editor-in-chief of the paper. Alvaro's incumbency lasted only for 45 days, however.

The armistice with the United States was proclaimed on 8 September 1943. With US and British forces invading from the south and German forces ensconced in the centre and north of the country, a period of intense danger for the civilian population of Rome appeared imminent, and Gorresio was one of many who went into a form of hiding. In his case, this meant quitting his editorship at Il Popolo and moving in with a distant cousin, the historian Paolo Brezzi, whose public profile was less exalted than his own. He tried to earn some money by undertaking academic research: for instance, he edited the so-called "Opuscoli politici" (literally, "political leaflets") of "M. Taparelli d'Azeglio" (1943). That assignment led him to become a regular visitor to the Rome central library, which was more discretely located at that time than it is today, and which had become the semi-clandestine meeting point for other intellectuals doing their best to stay out of sight. Here he was introduced by the partisan-journalist Felice Chilanti into a group of writers who called themselves "Armata garibaldina" (loosely, the "patriotic army"). Within the group Gorresio took for himself the informal pseudonym "fantomatico". Using it, he edited and distributed a little clandestine news-sheet called "Azione".

=== New beginnings ===
After the armistice Gorresio had very briefly returned to work on Il Popolo di Roma, until it was suppressed, compromised, in the eyes of the new rulers, by the extent of its association with the Mussolini governments. By the end of the war in Europe, two of his brothers had disappeared, presumed killed, fighting for the Germans on the Russian front. Gorresio now launched himself on a "Cursus honorum" for which he was amply qualified. With a return to democratic government, his own political philosophy became more visible. He was never a communist, but nor could he ever be taken for an Italian "Christian Democrat". Joining a political party could have compromised his independence as a journalist, and it was not something that he ever did, but his attitudes tended to align with those of the liberal left, or with the social democracy that was now emerging or returning as a major political force elsewhere in western Europe. With the benefit of hindsight it is possible to see Gorresio as part of a centre-left "third force" which began to define itself in the aftermath of war, and during the 1950s acquired something of an "ethical" role with a growing appeal to the more intellectually inclined elements of public opinion. Within Italy's newly revived media establishment, other representatives of this tendency, broadly defined, included friends and colleagues such as Mario Pannunzio, Arrigo Benedetti, Ennio Flaiano and Eugenio Scalfari. A number of new mass-circulation loosely liberal-leaning magazines and newspapers were launched or re-launched for the post-democratic age, among them L'Europeo, Il Mondo and La Stampa. Vittorio Gorresio became a regular contributor to each of them.

Gorresio joined Pannunzio's recently launched daily newspaper Risorgimento Liberale in 1945, initially as a news reporter and later as parliamentary editor. However, when Pannunzio left the publication late in 1947, in the context of "political differences" inside the Italian Liberal Party, Gorresio left too. Risorgimento Liberale ceased publication a year later. Gorresio stayed rather longer with Benedetti's L'Europeo, writing for the magazine regularly between 1945 and 1954. In 1949 Mario Pannunzio launched a yet more ambitiously named magazine, Il Mondo. Gorresio's contributions tended to deal with historical topics, with an evident preference for controversial themes. Through the 1950s he was parliamentary diarist for La Stampa (published in Turin), taking over as editorial director of the paper's Rome office after a few years. He retained that post till 1976 when cancer of the upper jaw forced him into a partial retirement, which he used in part to write a series of memorable articles concerned with the terrifying illness. He continued to write for La Stampa almost till he died.

=== On press freedom and press control ===
Gorresio set high standards for himself with respect to professional ethics and sometimes attracted hostility by trying to inflict similarly high standards on fellow journalists. At the 1946 biennial congress of the National Press Federation ("Federazione Nazionale Stampa Italiana") he placed himself in the minority by opposing the creation of a Membership Register of the journalists' professional association ("Ordine dei giornalisti"), because he thought such a register risked becoming a "corporate instrument" which might facilitate political control and so restrict press freedom. Coming shortly after the violent ending of more than two decades of one-party dictatorship, it was an understandable concern. He returned to the theme of restrictive press control at the 1958 Amici del Mondo convention. He used La Stampa to take a stand in the wake of the Montesi case, deploring the excesses displayed by journalists keen to "secure a scoop". (Note: Wilma Monteso was a highly-publicised murder victim. A journalist called Fabrizio Menghini "managed to gain access" to her dead body. The body's state of semi-undress was described in some newspapers in excruciating detail. Wild conspiracy theories, some involving alleged connections with political figures, proliferated.) In a contribution published on 30 November 1954 he spelled out his concern that this type of behaviour could all too easily be used to justify government restrictions on press freedoms.

=== Death ===
Vittorio Gorresio died of cancer at his home in central Rome.

== Output: books (selection) ==
- Camillo Cavour, Milano, Zucchi, 1937.
- L'esperienza di un dopoguerra. Note sulla lotta antibolscevica in Italia dal 1917 al 1921, Roma, Edizioni italiane, 1943.
- Opuscoli politici. Massimo D'Azeglio, Torino, Giulio Einaudi, 1943.
- Un anno di libertà, Roma, OET Edizioni polilibraria, 1945.
- I moribondi di Montecitorio, Milano, Longanesi, 1947.
- I carissimi nemici, Milano, Longanesi, 1949.
- I bracci secolari, Modena, Guanda, 1951.
- Risorgimento scomunicato, Firenze, Parenti, 1958.
- Stampa in allarme, Gorresio e altri, a cura di Adolfo Battaglia, Bari, Laterza, 1958.
- L'Italia a sinistra, Milano, Rizzoli, 1963.
- La nuova missione, Milano, Rizzoli, 1968.
- Roma ieri e oggi (1870–1970), Milano, Rizzoli, 1970.
- Il sesto Presidente, Milano, Rizzoli, 1972.
- Il papa e il diavolo, Milano, Rizzoli, 1973.
- Berlinguer , Milano, Feltrinelli, 1976.
- Costellazione cancro. Come si entra e come si esce dal tunnel della più tragica malattia del nostro tempo, Milano, Rizzoli, 1976.
- La vita ingenua, Rizzoli, Milano 1980; La vita ingenua, Preface by Massimo Onofri, UTET, Torino 2007
- La vita ingenua. Costellazione cancro, Seconda edizione, Milano, Rizzoli, 1980.
- Trent'anni dopo, with Giampaolo Pansa and Lietta Tornabuoni, Milano, Valentino Bompiani, 1976.
