= Morabito 'ndrina =

- Founded: 1950s
- Founder: Giuseppe Morabito
- Founding location: Africo, Calabria, Italy
- Years active: 1950s-present
- Territory: Africo in Calabria; Provinces of Milan, Varese, Como, and Monza and Brianza in Lombardy; Province of Rome in Lazio.
- Ethnicity: Calabrians
- Criminal activities: Drug trafficking, money laundering, arms trafficking, extortion, corruption, murder

The Morabito 'ndrina is a powerful clan of the 'Ndrangheta, a criminal and mafia-type organisation in Calabria, Italy. The 'ndrina is based in Africo, located in the Locride area, from where operations conducted in northern Italy and abroad are directed.

In Milan, the Morabito 'ndrina main allies are the Bruzzaniti and Palamara 'ndrine, both also originally from Africo. The Morabitos also maintain strong ties with the Maisano, Pansera, Versace, Zappia, Mollica, Criaco, and Scriva 'ndrine. The group is established in the provinces of Varese, Como, and Monza and Brianza. In Rome, they have been reported to operate in the Flaminio district.

The 'ndrina has extended its network to other European countries, South America, and Africa. Its leader until his arrest in 2004 was Giuseppe Morabito, known as U Tiradrittu, who was the most wanted Calabrian fugitive at the time.

== History ==
=== 1950s ===
In 1952, Giuseppe Morabito was reported for unlawful occupation of property and damage, illegal possession of weapons, coercion, and assault.

=== 1960s and 1970s ===
In 1965, Morabito was the subject of a complaint for unlawful occupation and vandalism of buildings, illegal possession of firearms, coercion, and assault.

The Locri massacre took place on June 23, 1967. During this event, mafia leaders Domenico Cordì, Carmelo Siciliano, and Vincenzo Saraceno were killed. The objective of the attack was to punish Domenico Cordì, who had engaged in cigarette trafficking on his own, bypassing the Morabito 'ndrina, which controlled this activity in the region. Accused of homicide, Giuseppe Morabito was eventually released in 1971 due to lack of evidence.

During the Reggio revolt, Giuseppe Morabito was reportedly contacted by intelligence services seeking information about certain kidnappings in northern Italy.

=== 1980s ===
In the 1980s, the Morabito 'ndrina was primarily involved in heroin trafficking. Santo Pasquale Morabito, relative of Giuseppe Morabito, was sent to Northern Italy under mandatory residence restrictions. In 1982, the Cosa Nostra capo of San Giuseppe Jato, Antonio Salamone, surrendered at the Carabinieri station in Africo. According to the testimony of the informant Vittorio Ierinò, Totò Riina, the head of the Corleonesi, is said to have spent a period in hiding in Africo, disguised as a priest.

In 1985, the so-called "Motticella feud" broke out with between the Morabito 'ndrina and the Palamara-Scriva 'ndrina.

=== 1990s ===
In the 1990s, the Morabito 'ndrina expanded their operations through money laundering and cocaine trafficking in collaboration with Colombian drug cartels. They employed intermediaries for this trade, such as former priest Franco Mondellini from Brancaleone, born in Parabiago in the province of Milan, who was arrested by police in 1996 near Parma. In 1994, he played a key role in establishing the Morabito's presence in Colombia, particularly Bogotá.

The clan also formed alliances with Albanian mafia groups. During the same period, the Olimpia investigation revealed the 'ndrina’s infiltration into the administration of the University of Messina.

In March 1993, fugitive Pietro Morabito was arrested after being betrayed by the issue date on his identity card — February 29, 1993, a non-existent day. That same year, Rocco Morabito was arrested in Messina and sentenced to two years in prison for extorting the company Sir S.r.l. – Società Italiana di Ristorazione.

In 1996, Domenico Morabito, the eldest son of Giuseppe Morabito, was killed in Africo.

A 1997 ruling issued by the Court of Locri against Giuseppe Morabito revealed that ships arriving from South America were offloading hundreds of kilograms of "materials to be refined" into the sea off the coast of Africo.

In connection with the alleged involvement in the murder of Matteo Bottari, head of the Department of Diagnostic and Endoscopic Surgery at the University of Messina, killed on January 15, 1998, Giuseppe Morabito was definitively acquitted during Operation Panta Rei.

=== 2000s ===
In 2003, following the Armonia investigation, the existence of a mafia association known as crimine, which united various Calabrian clans along the Ionian coast under the leadership of Giuseppe Morabito, was revealed. Among the members of this organization were, among others, Giuseppe Pansera, Filiberto Maesano, Antonio Pelle, and Giuseppe Pelle.

On February 18, 2004, Giuseppe Morabito, nicknamed U Tiraddrittu, then aged 70 and considered the top figure among the 'Ndrangheta members, was arrested in Cardeto, Calabria, after being on the run for 12 years. According to the Parliamentary Anti-Mafia Commission, he was even more significant than the Capo di tutti capi of Cosa Nostra, Bernardo Provenzano. His arrest was carried out during a joint operation between the Carabinieri’s Special Operations Group (Raggruppamento Operativo Speciale) and the provincial command of the Carabinieri in the Province of Reggio Calabria.

On October 21, 2005, Operation Ciaramella began in Africo and San Luca targeting drug trafficking. Fifty individuals were arrested, including Salvatore Morabito, one of the main traffickers from Africo, along with 99 other suspects. On February 13, 2007, they were collectively sentenced to a total of 153 years in prison.

On March 24, 2006, Brunetta Morabito, niece of the boss Giuseppe Morabito, was wounded by three gunshots fired by her brother, Giovanni Morabito, in Messina. Giovanni later surrendered himself to the Carabinieri in Reggio Calabria.

On May 3, 2007, a large-scale anti-mafia operation was carried out in Milan targeting the Morabito, Bruzzaniti, and Palamara clans. During the operation, 250 kilograms of cocaine were confiscated in the Lombard capital. The drugs originated from South America and arrived via Dakar, Senegal, and then through the Port of Genoa. This drug trafficking was led by Salvatore Morabito, while Leone Autelitano managed the connections between Calabria, Milan, and Brazil.

On January 28, 2008, during Operation Onorata Sanità in Calabria, 18 individuals were arrested, including regional councilor Domenico Crea and members of the Morabito clan, on charges of mafia association, infiltration into public administration, forgery, and use of forged documents. On February 13, during Operation Noas, 50 people affiliated with the Morabito, Bruzzaniti, and Palamara clans were arrested, among them the mayor of Staiti and the deputy mayor of Brancaleone. These clans were also involved in trafficking with the Camorra's Casalesi clan.

On October 22, 2008, Domenico Morabito, nephew of the boss Giuseppe Morabito, was arrested by officers from Locri and Africo Nuovo. He was apprehended on charges of mafia association and currency forgery. Domenico had previously escaped during an earlier police operation called Bellu Lavuru.

=== 2010s ===
On April 26, 2010, after four days of pursuit, Rocco Morabito, son of the former boss Giuseppe Morabito and then leader of the Morabito 'ndrina, was arrested in Melito di Porto Salvo.

On May 31, 2010, Santo Gligora, one of the most wanted fugitives in Italy and a member of the Morabito 'ndrina, was arrested in Platì. He had been on the run for 13 years.

On March 5, 2013, Operation Metropolis, carried out by the Financial Guard of Reggio Calabria and the Central Investigation Service on Organized Crime in Rome, concluded with the arrest of 20 individuals, including Giuseppe Morabito (already in prison), his son Rocco Morabito, and Francesco Sculli, father of the footballer Giuseppe Sculli. During this operation, €450 million were confiscated from the 'ndrina.

On January 10, 2017, Operation Buena Ventura, which lasted two years, concluded with the uncovering of an international drug trafficking network led by Rocco Morabito. He was in contact with members of Colombian cartels.

On September 4, 2017, Rocco Morabito was captured in the city of Montevideo, Uruguay after 23 years on the run in an operation carried out by the Uruguayan police. The boss had been living there since 2001 with a Brazilian passport under the false name "Francisco Antonio Capeletto Souza." On March 9, 2018, a judge in Montevideo approved his extradition.

On September 26, 2017, Giuseppe Morabito, known as "Pascià" (born 1986), nephew of Giuseppe "U Tiradrittu" and son of Domenico (killed by police in 1996), was arrested in Cantù, Lombardy on charges of mafia association and aggravated extortion. The 'ndrina was establishing itself there, spreading terror in the nightclubs of Piazza Garibaldi, demanding protection money from local merchants, and challenging rivals from Mariano Comense. Wiretaps revealed that Morabito was connected to businessman Antonino Lugarà, who was arrested the same day for corruption along with the mayor of Seregno.

On May 7, 2018, Operation Santa Cruz concluded, spanning Reggio Calabria, and the northern Italian cities of Domodossola, Milan, Gallarate, and Busto Arsizio. The State Police executed arrest warrants for 13 individuals suspected of trafficking and dealing narcotics in the Val d'Ossola area and the neighboring Swiss territory. Investigations revealed connections with Calabria, where drug seizures were also carried out. Among those arrested was Giovanni Rosario Russo from Roccaforte del Greco, previously convicted in the early 1990s for international drug trafficking and believed to be linked to members of the 'Ndrangheta settled in Val d'Ossola, connected to the Paviglianiti 'ndrina of San Lorenzo as well as the Morabito 'ndrina.

On 24 June 2019, Rocco Morabito escaped from the central penitentiary (Cárcel Central) of Montevideo with three other inmates "through a hole in the roof of the building".

On July 3, 2019, the Police in Rome seized movable and immovable assets valued at €120 million, including properties in Rome, Rignano Flaminio, Morlupo, Campagnano di Roma, and Grottaferrata, as well as a family trust and a business network contract. These assets belonged to the alleged affiliates Antonio Placido Scriva, Domenico Morabito, Domenico Antonio Mollica, Giuseppe Velonà, and Salvatore Ligato of the Morabito-Palamara-Scriva 'ndrine.

=== 2020s ===
On May 24, 2021, Rocco Morabito was finally arrested in João Pessoa, Paraíba in Brazil. He was extradited to Italy on July 6, 2022.
