= Tino Petrelli =

Italian photographer (1922–2001)

- Petrelli at work during the flood in Polesine in 1951
- Born: August 6, 1922; Fontanafredda, Pordenone, Kingdom of Italy
- Died: September 8, 2001 (aged 79); Piacenza, Italy
- Occupation: Photographer
- Known for: Documentary photography

Valentino Petrelli (August 6, 1922 – September 8, 2001), better known as Tino, was an Italian photographer, well known for his documentary photography. He covered Italy under fascist rule, the war and reconstruction, as well as the economic boom in the 1960s and the social conflicts in the 1970s.

== Early life ==
Tino Petrelli was born in Fontanafredda, Pordenone, in the northeast Italian region of Friuli-Venezia Giulia. The family lived in precarious economic conditions due to heavy debts, and all the Petrelli's were forced to leave their home town. When Valentino - the last of five siblings - was born, his father was working as a carpenter in France. In precarious economic conditions due to heavy debts, all the Petrelli's were forced to leave their home town. In 1934, the entire family moved to Milan to join their eldest son Carlo, who had left a few years earlier, taking lodgings in a single room.

In 1934, at the age of 12 his family moved to Milan and in 1937 he started to work for Publifoto (it), a photo agency founded by the photographer Vincenzo Carrese (it), as an office boy, and then moved on to developing and printing in the darkroom. At the age of 16 he started to work as photographer for the agency himself.

In January 1942 he was enlisted in the army and assigned as a photographer to the 8th Engineer Corps regiment in the 2nd artillery brigade stationed in Rome. In July he was attached to the Italian Expeditionary Corps in Russia, from where he returned in October of the same year for serious family reasons. In May 1943, he was reassigned to the photo section of the Engineer Corps in Rome. After the armistice between Italy and the US and UK on 8 September 1943, he joined Mussolini’s Italian Social Republic but after a year's service, he chose to desert.

== Photojournalism career ==
In Milan during the days of the liberation, he followed from the street the arrival of the partisan columns, the capture of fascist and also the gruesome display of the bodies of Benito Mussolini, Claretta Petacci and other high-ranking Fascists in Piazzale Loreto. Some of his photos taken in those days, such as the one of a group of partisans stationed on the rooftops of Milan or the well-known image of three girls marching in the street with rifles on their arms, have gone down in history for having been constructed by posing the protagonists themselves, passers-by or colleagues.

Street scene of the town of Africo in 1948 (Photo: Tino Petrelli)

In 1948 he made a famous series of documentary photographs, showing the misery, exclusion and hunger of the people in poverty-stricken village of Africo in the Aspromonte, in Calabria. The series was published in the magazine L'Europeo, jointly with an article, entitled Africo, symbol of disparity, by the journalist Tommaso Besozzi. The pictures produced an outrage from national public opinion which, at the time, was rediscovering the dramatic situation of the "southern question". The article was part of inquiry into the poverty in southern Italy for which Besozzi and Petrelli travelled in the region for a few months in 1948 and included a reportage about the conditions in the suburbs of Naples.

In 1951, he documented the flooding of the Polesine, which compelled 150,000 people to evacuate the entire area between the lower courses of the Adige and the Po rivers. In the same years, he repeatedly dealt with agricultural work and in particular with the female rice-workers.

A lover of race cycling, Petrelli followed the Giro d'Italia with passion. One photo in particular went down in the history of Italian sport: an image taken of Fausto Coppi, at the Stelvio Pass during the 1953 Giro, as he looked at the words 'W Fausto' drawn in the snow. A perfect shot in which the cyclist admired, his face contracted from exertion, the incitement dedicated to him. It was Petrelli himself, years later, who revealed that he had drawn that inscription and pointed it out to his cyclist friend as he passed.

In the mid-1960s, the agency severely reduced its activity and shortly afterwards, Petrelli also reduced his reporting practice and turned towards advertising and industrial photography. From 1973 to 1981, he continued to collaborate with Publifoto and began sorting through the photographic archives. He died in Piacenza on 7 September 2001.

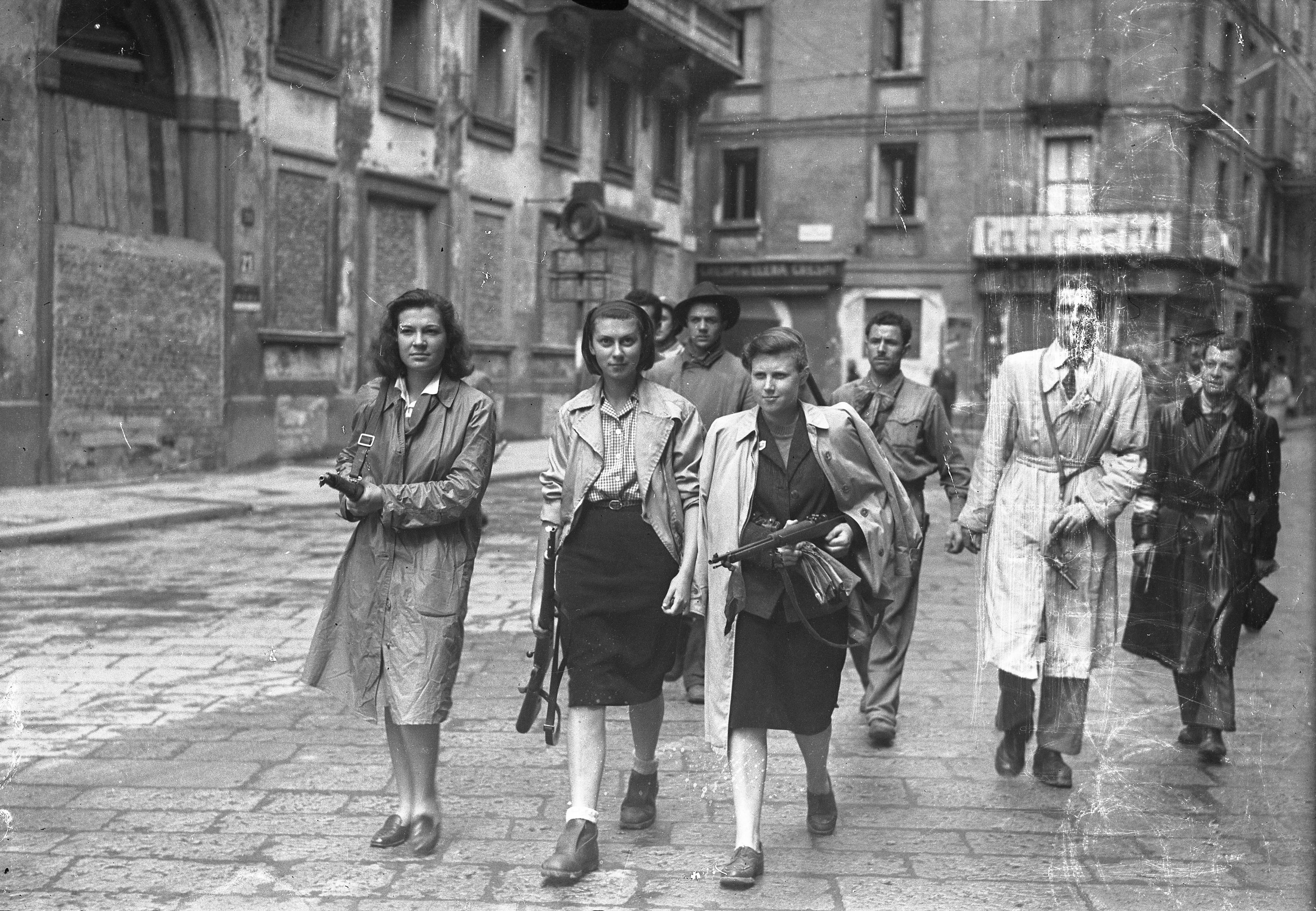
Three partisan girls armed with rifles in Via Brera (Milan), 26 April 1945

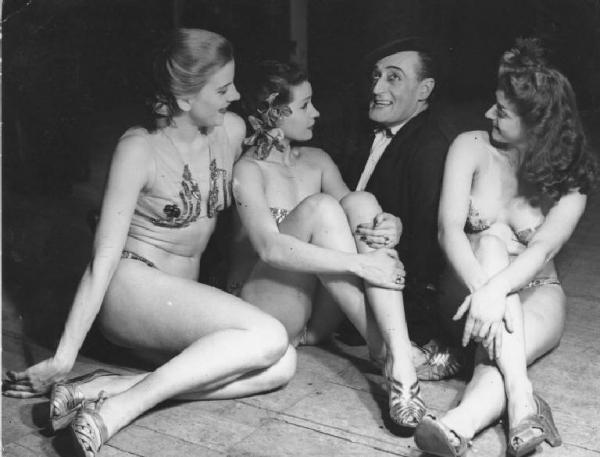
Italian comical actor Totò and three dancers in "Once upon a time in the world", 1 February 1948

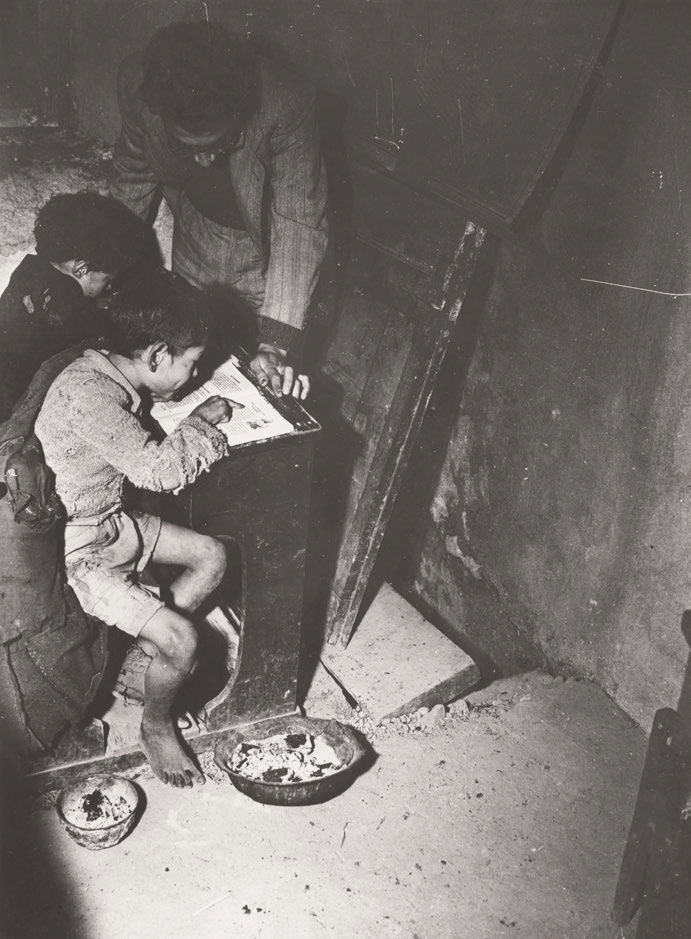
Interior of the Africo primary school, March 1948

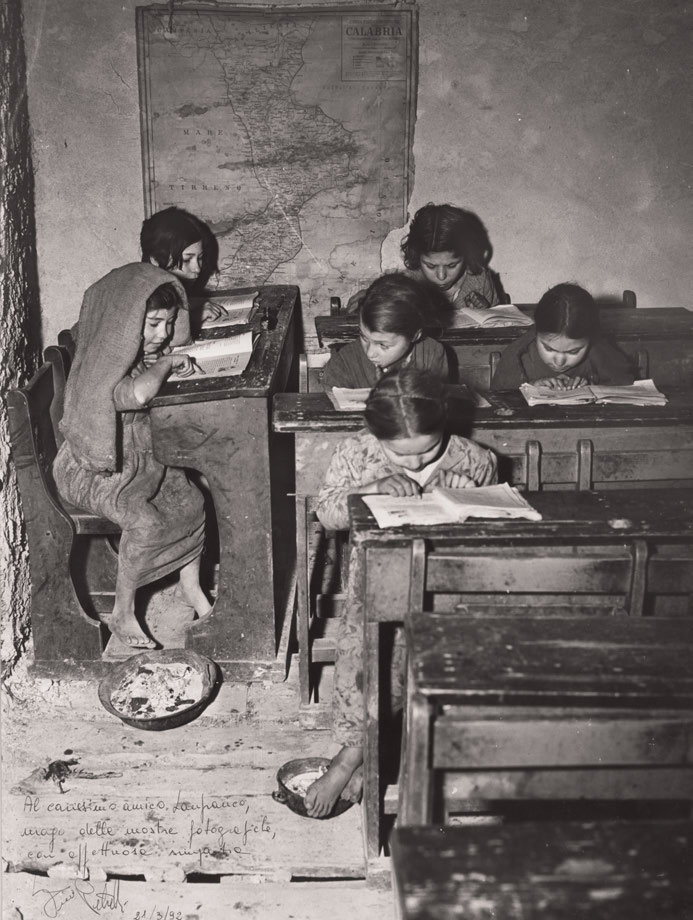
Interior of the Africo primary school, March 1948

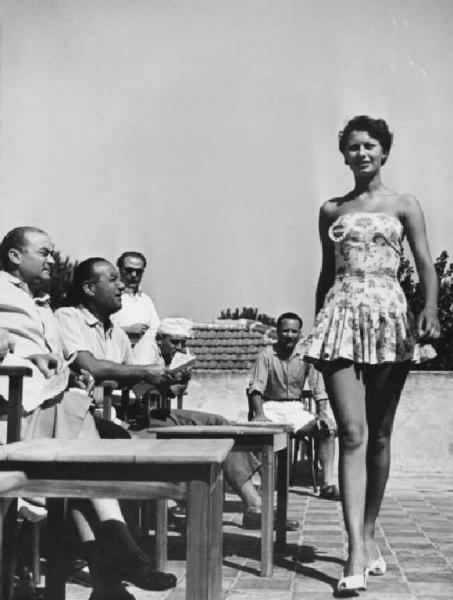
Sophia Loren at the 1950 Miss Italy beauty pageant, 1950

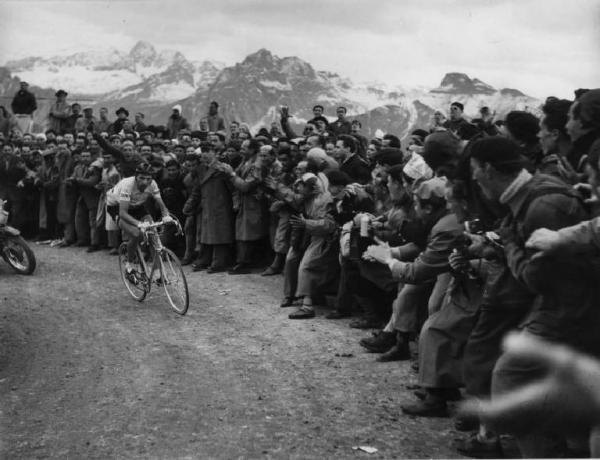
Fausto Coppi on the Pordoi Pass in the 1952 Giro d'Italia, 29 May 1952

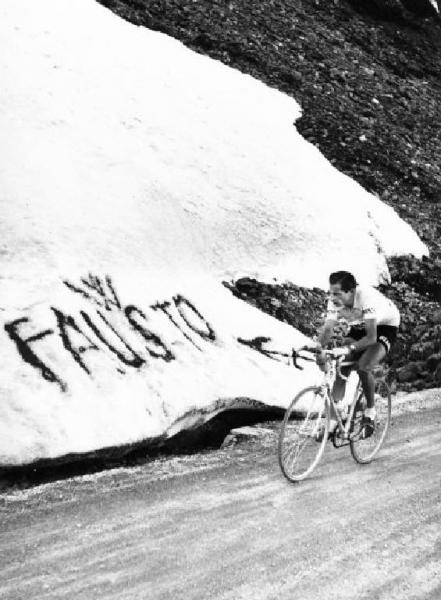
Famous photo of Fausto Coppi at the 1953 Giro d'Italia, 1 June 1953
