= Eurialo De Michelis =

Italian poet and writer (1904–1990)

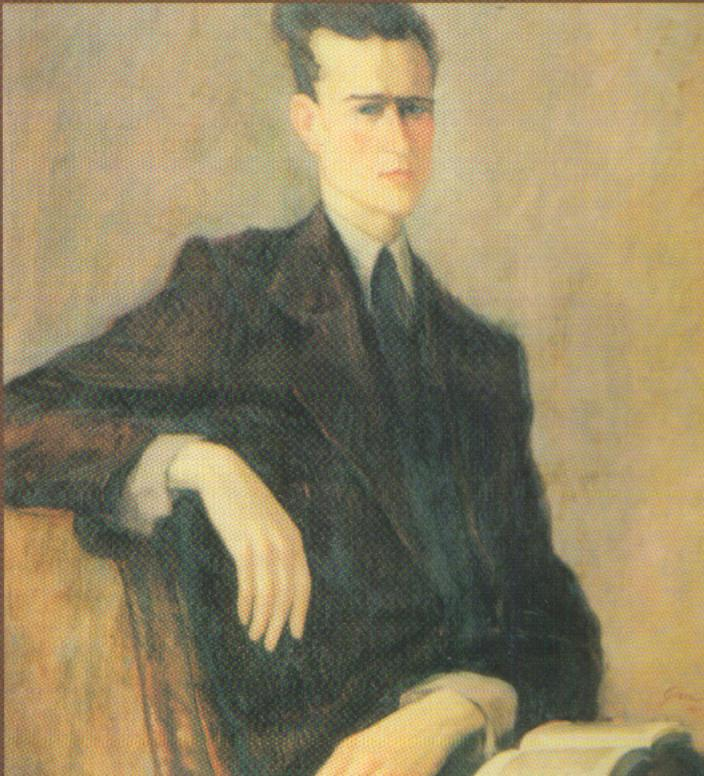
Eurialo De Michelis Roberto Rizzo, 1932

Eurialo De Michelis (23 October 1904 – 17 December 1990) was an Italian writer, poet and literary critic born in Salerno in Mezzogiorno.

== Biography ==
De Michelis was born in Salerno, although his family was a northern one, originating in Liguria and Piedmont. While he was still young they moved back to the north, settling in Vicenza in the Veneto, where his father, a Methodist minister, had been invited to take on his own parish.

De Michelis launched his literary career with a volume of poetry published in 1927 and entitled Aver vent'anni (loosely, "Aged twenty") which was followed by his first narrative work, Adamo (1930), three years later. This marked him out as a proponent of the new neorealist literary movement. He moved from Vicenza to Rome in 1932. After producing two collections of short stories - Bugie (1931) and Distacco (1934) - he devoted himself principally to non-fiction, producing studies of Grazia Deledda, Federigo Tozzi, Giovanni Verga, Fyodor Dostoevsky, Alberto Moravia, Alessandro Manzoni, Gabriele D'Annunzio and Giuseppe Gioachino Belli. Later he returned to another focus which was on poetry, with significant collections published in 1962 and in 1965 (Poesie a ritroso and Viaggio in carrozza).

In 1933 he teamed up with Mario Pannunzio and Antonio Delfini to create what became the liberal-leaning Oggi magazine, described originally as "a weekly journal of literature and the arts" (Settimanale di lettere ed arti).

== Memberships and awards (selection) ==
De Michelis was a member of the Accademia degli Arcadi. He received various awards, including the Fracchia Prize for narrative organised by the La Fiera Letteraria. He received the Manzoni Prize and the D'Annunzio Prize; and the Roncaglia Prize from the Accademia dei Lincei in respect of his entire non-fiction output.

== Legacy ==
Eurialo De Michelis built up a significant library which was sold to the Biblioteca Classense in Ravenna after he died. De Michelis maintained contact with many leading figures of twentieth century Italian literature: the collection offers important insights and comprises many volumes covering fiction, non-fiction and poetry.

His personal papers are deposited at the University of Pavia Manuscripts Centre, and in the Venetian Manuscripts Archive at the University of Padua.
