= Mario Pannunzio =

Italian politician (1910–1968)

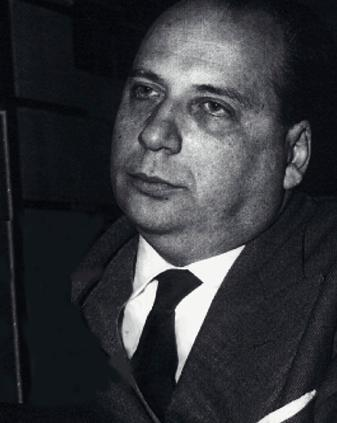
- Born: 5 March 1910; Lucca, Tuscany, Italy
- Died: 10 February 1968 (aged 57); Rome, Italy
- Education: Sapienza University of Rome
- Occupations: Artist (briefly); Movie pioneer (briefly); Political journalist Newspaper editor-director
- Political party: PLI (1944–1947; 1951–1955); PR (from 1955)
- Spouse: Mary Malina
- Parent(s): Guglielmo Pannunzio; Emma Bernardini

Mario Pannunzio (5 March 1910 – 10 February 1968) was an Italian journalist and politician. As a journalist he was the director in charge of the daily newspaper Risorgimento Liberale (Liberal reawakening) in the 1940s and of the weekly political magazine Il Mondo (The World) in the 1950s. As a politician he was a co-founder of the revived Italian Liberal Party in the 1940s and then of the Radical Party in 1955.

== Life ==
=== Early years ===
Mario Pannunzio was born in Lucca, a prosperous Tuscan city a short distance inland to the north of Pisa. He was the second son of Guglielmo Pannunzio, a lawyer of strong communist proclivities originally from the Abruzzo region. The boy's mother, Emma Bernardini, came from a traditional catholic family from the minor aristocracy. When Mario was 10 his father fell foul of the local Fascists and the family were obliged to relocate, ending up in Rome which is where Mario completed his schooling at the prestigious liceo classico Mamiani (classical secondary school). After this, respectful of his father's wishes, he enrolled at Rome University, emerging on 6 July 1931 with a degree in jurisprudence.

The grade of his university degree was indifferent: he had been keen to obtain his degree quickly in order to clear the way for dedicating himself to his real passion, which was not for law but for art. While still at university he became a regular visitor at the Caffè Aragno in the city centre, which was a favourite meeting point for cerebrally inclined intellectuals during the 1930s. He himself became known as "lo Sfaccendato" ("the idler") at the cafe according to one commentator, although his later achievements suggest that the judgement may have rested on incomplete information. In 1931 he took part in the "Prima quadriennale d'arte nazionale" (art exhibition) which ran from January till August 1931, exhibiting several pictures including a portrait of his sister, Sandrina. By 1934, however, he had abandoned painting, turning instead to literary criticism. He got to know Attilio Riccio, formerly a fellow law student, who introduced him to this new milieu, and joined the editorial team of "Il Saggiatore", a short-lived left-field cultural magazine which had originated as a student publication. He contributed reviews and articles in which he discussed the general characteristics and purpose of the novel. It was also around this time that he renewed his acquaintance with Arrigo Benedetti (the two had known each other as children in Lucca.) and began his long friendship with Ennio Flaiano.

Between 1933 and 1935 he was involved in three magazines, founded with a group of friends:

- "Oggi. Settimanale di lettere ed arti" (later "Rassegna mensile") was produced between May 1931 and May 1934. The "Oggi" group was formed by Pannunzio, together with Antonio Delfini, Eurialo De Michelis, Guglielmo Serafini and Elio Talarico. The project elaborated a debate on the renewal of Italian literature. The magazine claimed for itself a "neo-realist orientation" over the issues of the age, and contrasted this with the more traditional existing approach represented by publications such as "Strapaese" and "Il Selvaggio", both of which opposed the avant-garde extremes encountered during the early decades of the twentieth century. Other sources state simply that "Oggi" was closed down after February 1942 at the request of Georg von Mackensen, the German ambassador.
- "La Corrente", co-founded with Alberto Moravia.
- "Caratteri", launched in March 1935 and surviving till July of that year. Pannunzio founded it together with Arrigo Benedetti and Antonio Delfini.

These early experiences of journalism would be highly significant: Panunzio understood "the enormous influence of journalism", a form of communication he had been inclined to overlook when, as a very young man, he had been preoccupied with communicating through art and literary criticism.

It was in 1935 that Mario Pannunzio married Mary Malina, a young Hungarian actress whom he had met at a Rome theatre. The marriage was childless.

During 1936 and 1937 Pannunzio devoted himself to cinema. Basing himself at the newly established Experimental film centre in Rome, he directed the short film "Vecchio Tabarin" ("Old Tabarin").

=== Journalism and the Rotogravure printing process ===
He switched to journalism in 1937 invited, with Arrigo Benedetti to join the editorial team on "Omnibus". Newly set up by Leo Longanesi, and operated under the auspices of the Rizzoli-Corriere della Sera group, the weekly news magazine was produced using the then innovative Rotogravure printing process. Pannunzio contributed as the film critic. However, in February 1939 "Omnibus" was closed down by the government. By this time two years working on Longanesi's periodical had provided Pannunzio with an effective apprenticeship in an editorial office.

Identified as one of the best of Longanesi's "apprentices", Pannunzio was invited to Milan by Angelo Rizzoli who was planning to launch a new magazine using "Rotogravure". With Benedetti, Pannunzio now set about creating a new intellectual focus for non-mainstream intellectuals. He chose to use the title of his earlier short-lived publication, "Oggi" ("Today"). On this occasion Oggi survived till January 1942 before it was closed down by the Fascist authorities after it published an article by a contributor whom they disliked. Pannunzio returned to Rome.

Later that year the Mussolini government fell. Pannunzio joined with Leo Longanesi to compose the editorial which appeared in Il Messaggero on 26/27 July 1943, celebrating the return of liberty. During the German occupation of Rome (which began on 8 September 1943), Pannunzio formed a clandestine liberal grouping with like minded friends in the city, "the Italian liberal movement". The mouthpiece of the movement, "Risorgimento Liberale"("Liberal Re-awakening") was a notionally daily newspaper, published at irregular intervals during the second half of 1943 and thereafter till the liberation of Rome (4 June 1944). During December 1943 Pannunzio was arrested by Nazis while he was in the newspaper's print works: he spent several months in the Regina Coeli (prison).

After the liberation, Pannunzio was appointed director of "Risorgimento Liberale", which now became the official newspaper of the newly reconstituted Italian Liberal Party. (The old liberal party had been banned under the Fascist regime which preferred to operate with a one-party political structure.) The middle and later 1940s were characterised by powerful political disagreement in Italy. Pannunzio did not hesitate to oppose the National Liberation Committee ("Comitato di Liberazione Nazionale" / CLN), a broad coalition of political groupings united only by opposition to Fascism and, until the general election of June 1946, the closest thing occupied post-war Italy had to a government. He was particularly critical of the CLN's muted response to the Foibe massacres, ethnic cleansing in Yugoslavia and over the issue of Italian prisoners still held in the Soviet Union after the end of the war. For Pannunzio anti-Stalinism went hand in had with anti-Fascism, a political viewpoint that was far from mainstream on the Italian left, and not universal among many in the political centre.

At the end of 1947 Roberto Lucifero was appointed General Secretary of the Italian Liberal Party. This reflected events at the Party Congress of November 1947 which had been widely interpreted as a take-over by the party's right wing. (Lucifero himself was a fervent monarchist, which in the eyes of some was the next worst thing to a closet fascist.) Pannunzio now joined the former party leader, Leone Cattani, and others, in resigning his party membership. Later he joined Altiero Spinelli's European Federalist Movement.

=== "Il Mondo" ===
Pannunzio now received separate offers from the journalist turned media magnate Gianni Mazzocchi and from the Rizzoli-Corriere della Sera group to take on leadership of a new magazine. In both cases he was offered the opportunity of a "blank canvas" in respect of design and editorial positioning. After carefully evaluating both propositions, Pannunzio chose Mazzocchi. Preparing for launch took place during 1948 and early 1949. In the meantime, Pannunzio contributed to the weekly magazine L'Europeo, produced by Gianni Mazzocchi and under the editorial control of his friend Arrigo Benedetti. Pannunzio took on "political editorship" work at the magazine's Rome office.

For his own daily newspaper he took the name "Il Mondo" (the world), reviving, not for the first time, the name of an earlier publication that had been closed down under the Mussolini government. The first edition of "Il Mondo" appeared on 19 February 1949. Thanks to the personal prestige of its founders the new newspaper quickly became a focus for collecting and presenting the important intellectual developments of the time. The number and the quality of its contributors combined with the various issues tackled made its managing editor, Mario Pannunzio an informal but influential member of the political class, despite operating from outside from outside the conventional parliamentary institutions. The use he made of this privilege to exercise his influence responsibly made him an excellent role model for a rising generation of "political opinion journalists".

By 1951 Pannunzio had become politically influential among liberals and members of the intellectual class: when he rejoined the Italian Liberal Party that year, there were many "friends of Il Mondo" who did the same.

=== The Radical Party ===
In 1954 the Italian Liberal Party elected a new party secretary, Giovanni Malagodi which was widely perceived s another lurch to the right. On 15 July 1954 Pannunzio, Carandini, Libonati and Paggi reacted by resigning - in Panninzio's case for the second time - from the Liberal Party. This time the splitting of the Liberal Party led to the establishment in Rome on 9 December 1955 of a new party, the "Radical Party of Liberals and Democrats" ("Partito radicale dei democratici e dei liberali"). Unsurprisingly, the party quickly came to be known simply as the Radical Party. Leading co-founders of the Radical Party included Leopoldo Piccardi, Ernesto Rossi, Leo Valiani, Guido Calogero, Giovanni Ferrara, Paolo Ungari, Eugenio Scalfari and the man who became the longstanding leader of the Radical Party, Marco Pannella. The leaders of the new party were able to claim a degree of "liberal authenticity" superior to what remained of the Liberal Party. It was they who had clandestinely refounded the Liberal Party back in the 1940s. Pannunzio himself had been imprisoned during the German occupation for "antifascist resistance" between October 1943 and February 1944, after which it was he who had taken on leadership of the Risorgimento Liberale, the daily newspaper which, it could be argued (and was), had defined postwar Italian liberalism between 1943 and 1948. When the party was launched Pannunzio and Leo Valiani were two of the most high-profile members of its provisional executive committee.

By 1962 it was the Radical Party that was fracturing. Members elected that year to the party national executive were Bruno Villabruna, Leopoldo Piccardi, Ernesto Rossi and Marco Pannella. Pannunzio and Benedetti broke with the majority and withdrew. The causes of the breach were a combination of political and personal differences, with additional bitterness triggered by allegations on the activities of Leopoldo Piccardi during the Fascist years. It was believed that Piccardi had collaborated in 1941. Ernesto Rossi insisted that Piccardi should therefore be expelled from the party, but he failed to obtain a majority for this. Pannunzio was among those who opposed the expulsion proposal. Rossi became determined to get his own back against Pannunzio. He set about obtaining and photocopying articles from the weekly magazine "Oggi" covering the years from 1939 to 1943, in order to find material that he might use to challenge Pannunzio's own anti-fascist credentials. When Pannunzio discovered that Rossi was in the process of building up a personal dossier on him, the break between the two former friends was complete. Relations between Pannunzio and Rossi became "icy": Rossi's contributions to Il Mondo ceased.

=== Death ===
Il Mondo (The World) closed in March 1966. During his last couple of years Mario Pannunzio withdrew from public life, instead spending his time at home in his private library, which by this time comprised approximately 30,000 volumes. He died in Rome, supported by his wife, on 10 February 1968. The cause of his death was given as pulmonary fibrosis caused, according to at least one source, by his excessive smoking.
