= Jennarong Muengtaweepongsa =

Thai automobile designer

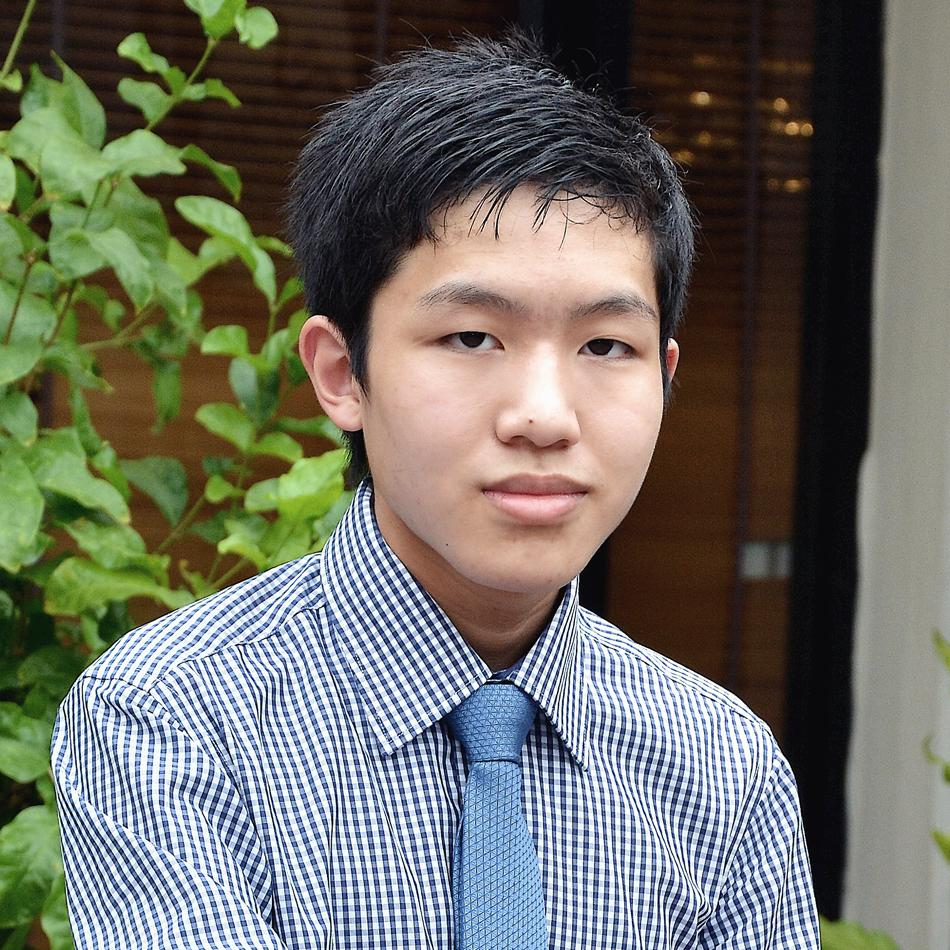
- Born: March 19, 2000 (age 25); Bangkok
- Occupation: Automobile designer
- Years active: 2012 - present
- Known for: Automobile design (see below)
- Website: http://www.vanaticaldesign.com

Jennarong Muengtaweepongsa (Thai: เจนณรงค์ มุ่งทวีพงษา, born 19 March 2000), also known as VanaticalDesign, is a Thai automobile designer known for designs such as the Koenigseggs Utagera and Legera concepts and the Aston Martin DB11 concept, among others.

Muengtaweepongsa has attended the Meet The Masters Seminar Event held by Quattroruote where he has met and been received by designers such as Chris Bangle, Giorgetto Giugiaro, Filippo Perini, and Walter de Silva.

He has also been invited to provide a guest lecture on his design work and related success at Mahidol University International Demonstration School. His Koenigsegg Utagera (Swedish for "terminate") concept was also featured in the 32nd Thai International Motor Expo under the exhibit 'Thai Automotive Designers Meet the Masters'.

== Career ==
Muengtaweepongsa started sketching cars since 2006 and got into 3D modeling by age 12 on applications such as Trimble SketchUp. Muengtaweepongsa's currently uses an array of design software from Blender to Luxion's Keyshot and Adobe's Photoshop.

=== Koenigsegg Utagera ===
The Utagera (Swedish for "terminate") was on display as a quarter scale show model at the Thailand International Motor Expo, being Muengtaweepongsa's first design to be built in a physical form. Envisioned specs on the Utagera include a 5.0-litre (310 cu in) V8 engine aspirated by a pair of turbos that would produce up to 1,000 brake-horsepower (750 kW) without any electrical aid.

The Utagera along with many of Jennarong's works is sponsored by Australian automotive parts manufacturer Brypar, showcasing their concept brakes.

=== ToBeUs x Quattroruote ===
Muengtaweepongsa was invited to design a wooden toy car in collaboration with Italian magazine Quattroruote for the ToBeUs Foundation. The model was to celebrate the magazine's 60th anniversary. It put on show at the Unicredit Pavilion in Milan, Italy.
