= Arrigo Benedetti =

Italian journalist (1910–1976)

- Born: June 1, 1910; Lucca, Italy
- Died: October 26, 1976 (aged 66); Rome, Italy
- Occupations: Journalist and writer
- Known for: Editor of Oggi, L'Europeo, L'Espresso, and Il Mondo

Arrigo Benedetti (June 1, 1910 – October 26, 1976) was an Italian journalist and writer. He was also the editor of important news magazines: Oggi (1939–1941), L'Europeo (1945–54), L'Espresso (1955–63), and Il Mondo (1969–72). Born as Giulio, he changed his name to Arrigo in 1933.

== Early life ==
Arrigo Benedetti was born in Lucca, in Tuscany (Italy). In 1937 he moved to Rome where he joined his study friend Mario Pannunzio. Both started to work the weekly Omnibus edited by Leo Longanesi. Omnibus was suppressed by Mussolini’s Fascist regime two years later. Benedetti and Pannunzio founded Oggi in 1939 until its suppression in 1941.

In December 1943 he was arrested, but managed to escape when the prison was hit by an Allied bombardment. He moved to Milan and joined the resistance against the German occupying forces and the Mussolini-led Italian Social Republic (Repubblica Sociale Italiana).

== Editor ==
In November 1945, he launched the news magazine L'Europeo with Gianni Mazzocchi. A journalist of particular importance himself, he created the so-called "Benedetti school of journalism" with journalists such as Tommaso Besozzi, Enzo Biagi, Giorgio Bocca, Oriana Fallaci and Indro Montanelli. The magazine paid special attention to photographic image and documentary photography. According to Benedetti: "People look at articles, but read the photos" (Gli articoli si guardano, le fotografie si leggono).

In 1953, the Rizzoli publishing company bought the publication, when during the Korean War the original publisher was not able anymore to cover rising expenses. The price of paper surged from 100 to 280 lire per kilogram. The original editor Benedetti left the magazine and launched a new weekly, L'Espresso, in October 1955, with Eugenio Scalfari, and backed by the progressive industrialist Adriano Olivetti, manufacturer of Olivetti typewriters.

Benedetti was the editor-in-chief until 1963, when he handed over to Scalfari. L'Espresso was characterized from the beginning by an aggressive investigative journalism strongly focussed on corruption and clientelism by the Christian Democrat party. In the 1950s it uncovered major scandals in the health and housing industries. In 1969 Benedetti refounded the weekly newsmagazine Il Mondo, founded by his old friend Mario Pannunzio in 1949, but discontinued in 1966.

== Novelist ==
As a novelist, Benedetti’s narrative style is characterized by a realistic and immediate language often comparerd with Italian neorealist cinema, in particular in his last book of fiction, Rosso al vento (Red in the Wind), describing life in Italy during World War II. His meticulous attention to everyday reality is manifest in all his novels from I misteri della città (The Mysterious of the City) (1941) to Gli occhi (Eyes) (1970).

He died of kidney failure on October 26, 1976, in the Fatebenefratelli Hospital in Rome.
