= Porto delle Grazie =

Porto delle Grazie - Marina di Roccella
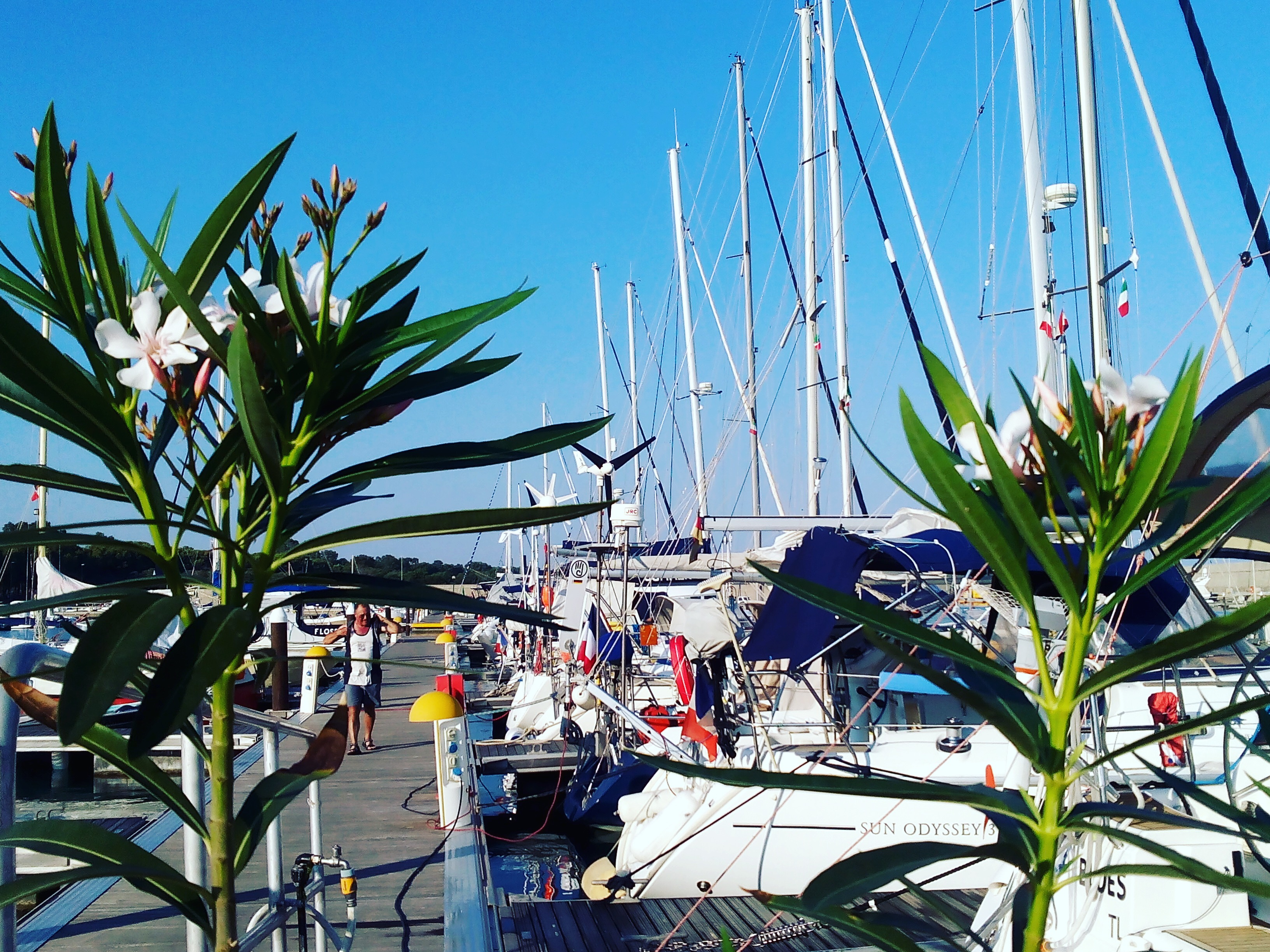
- Harbour
- Click on the map for a fullscreen view

Location
- Country: Italy
- Location: Roccella Ionica
- Coordinates: 38.327222°N 16.433333°E

Details
- Type of harbour: Touristic marina resort
- No. of berths: 450
- Draft depth: 4–5 m (13–16 ft)

Statistics
- Website www.portodellegrazie.com

Porto delle Grazie – Marina di Roccella, in Italy, is the marina of Roccella Ionica, municipality of the Locride, located in the metropolitan area of Reggio Calabria.

== Structure ==
The Marina is protected by two docks that orient the entrance to the west and consists of interior piers, modern finger, docks and quays slipway. The marina has 450 berths up to a maximum length of 44 meters (144 ft), with a depth of 4 to 5 m (13 to 16 ft), dredged in 2016.

== Connections ==
Porto delle Grazie is a touristic marine resort which mainly attracts the travellers of the Mediterranean, especially those exploring the Calabria or those that are directed to Greece, thanks to its proximity to the ports of Corfù and Kefalonia, Lefkas, or in Sicily. The marina is connected to the city center of Roccella Ionica by a modern bike path and a taxi service, equidistant to the airports of Lamezia Terme and Reggio Calabria. In addition, the 42 municipalities of Locride are easily accessible by public and private transport.

== Bathing ==
Porto delle Grazie is inserted in a favorable environment for bathing. Indeed Roccella Ionica has been awarded the 2016 Blue Flag (for the fourteenth consecutive year) and the 5 Sails (for the second consecutive year, among the only 19 Italian locations to receive the prestigious award).

== Curiosity ==
On 12 July 2016 the FBDesign team marked the nautical record on the Montecarlo - Roccella Ionica - Venice route, and the crew made their refueling stop at the Porto delle Grazie.
