= Fontanafredda =

- Comune
- Comune di Fontanafredda
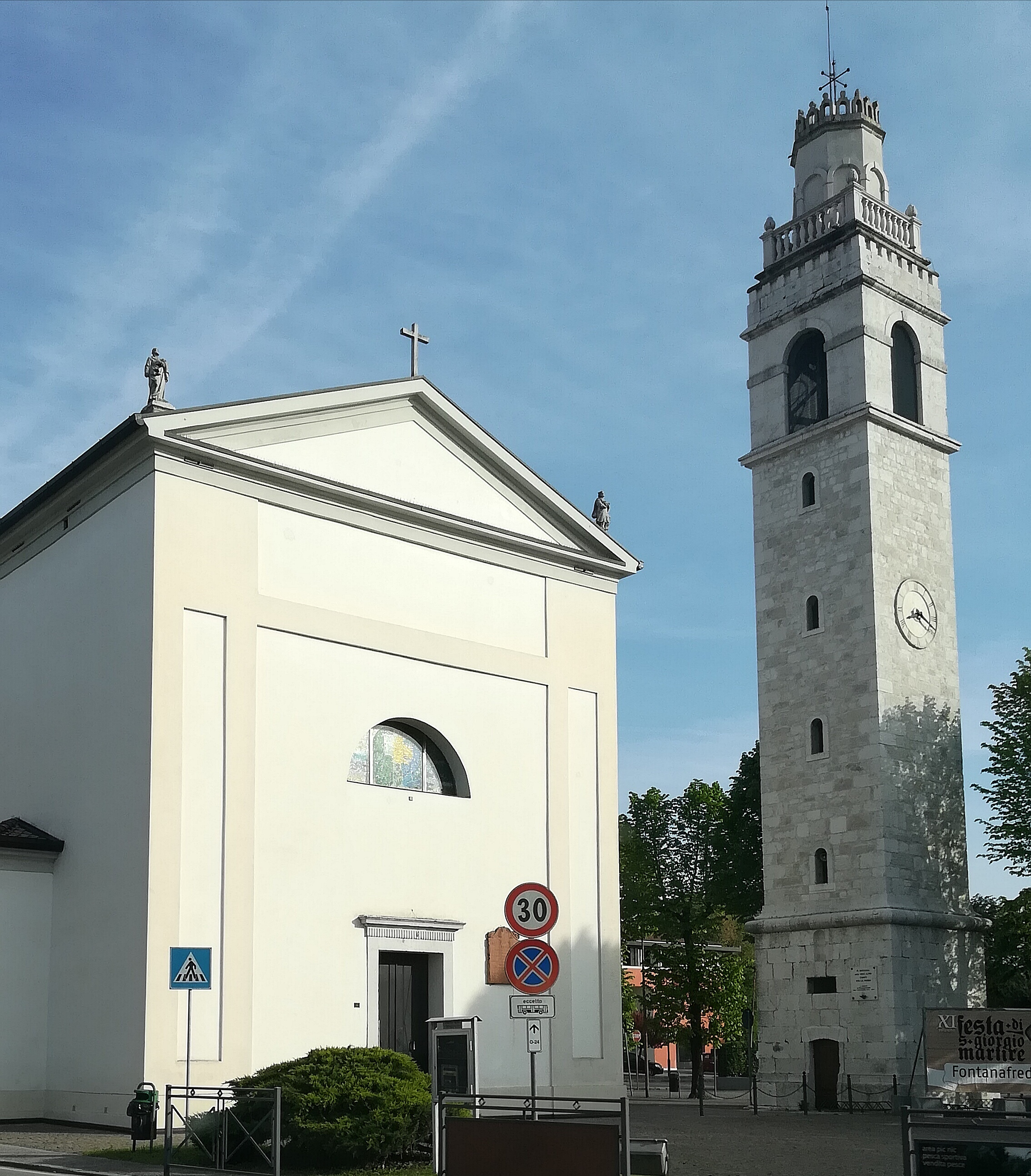

- Coat of arms

- Location within Italy Location within Friuli-Venezia Giulia
- Coordinates: 45°58′N 12°34′E
- Country: Italy
- Region: Friuli-Venezia Giulia
- Province: Pordenone (PN)
- Frazioni: Camolli-Casut, Ceolini, Forcate, Nave, Pieve, Ranzano, Romano, Ronche, Talmasson, Vigonovo, Villadolt

Government
  - Mayor: Michele Pegolo

Area
  - Total: 46 km^{2} (18 sq mi)
- Elevation: 52 m (171 ft)

Population (31 December 2014)
  - Total: 12,120
  - Density: 260/km^{2} (680/sq mi)
- Demonym: Fontanafreddesi
- Time zone: UTC+1 (CET)
  - Summer (DST): UTC+2 (CEST)
- Postal code: 33074
- Dialing code: 0434
- Patron saint: St. George
- Saint day: April 23
- Website: Official website

Fontanafredda (standard Friulian: Fontanefrede; Western Friulian: Fontanafredha; Venetian: Fontanafreda) is a comune (municipality) of about 12,000 inhabitants in the Regional decentralization entity of Pordenone, in the Italian region of Friuli-Venezia Giulia. The town hall is located in the frazione (borough) of Vigonovo.

== Sports ==
ASD Comunale Fontanafredda is the Italian football of the city. It was founded in 1925 as O.N.D. Fontanafredda and in 1940 was renamed Gil Fontanafredda, in 1945 Club della Fonte and in 1963 S.S. Fontanafredda. Currently it plays in Italy's Serie D after the promotion from Eccellenza Friuli-Venezia Giulia in the 2013–14 season.

Its home ground is Stadio Omero Tognon with 3,290 seats. The team's colors are red and black.

== International relations ==
=== Twin towns — sister cities ===
Fontanafredda is twinned with:

- Saint-Jean, France

== People ==
- Tino Petrelli (1922–2001), Italian photographer, well known for his documentary photography
