= Rocco Morabito (mobster, born 1966) =

'Ndrangheta mobster

- Born: 13 October 1966 (age 59); Africo, Reggio Calabria, Italy
- Other name: 'u tamunga
- Known for: Cocaine trafficking
- Status: Imprisoned since 2021
- Allegiance: Morabito 'ndrina / 'Ndrangheta
- Criminal charges: Drug trafficking • Mafia association

Rocco Morabito (Italian pronunciation: [ˈrɔkko moˈraːbito]; born 13 October 1966) is an Italian criminal and a member of the 'Ndrangheta, a Mafia-type organisation in Calabria. Before being arrested in Uruguay on 4 September 2017, he had been a fugitive since 1994 being wanted for drug trafficking, Mafia association and other serious crimes. In June 2019, Morabito escaped from prison, and was arrested again in Brazil in May 2021.

== 'Ndrangheta heritage ==
Morabito was born in Africo in the Locride in Calabria, the son of Domenico Morabito and Carmela Modaffari, and is related to 'Ndrangheta boss Giuseppe Morabito. In 1994, Morabito was sentenced to a 30-year prison sentence as a result of the "Fortaleza" operation, trafficking of over 600 kilograms of cocaine between Brazil and Italy. On 10 February 1995, an international arrest warrant on his name was issued. According to police investigators he is one of the top drug traffickers of the 'Ndrangheta. His nickname is 'u tamunga, because he was driving a DKW Munga, an all-wheel drive car from Germany.

== Cocaine king of Milan ==
At age 25 he was in Milan where he mingled among the local young rampant jet set, while operating as the right-hand man of his uncle Domenico Antonio Mollica, another important boss of the Morabito clan. Always wearing double-breasted suits, he was last seen in Milan when he was photographed by the police surrounded by his body guards with suitcases full of banknotes. According to a police investigator Morabito was able to make 15 billion Italian lire (approximately 7.5 million Euro) in two months.

Due to his involvement in trafficking cocaine from South America to Italy, Morabito was nicknamed the "cocaine king of Milan". Morabito was considered to be different than other crime bosses in those years, able to relate firsthand to the world of banks and accountants, finance and investment, understanding the importance of being low key and stop shedding blood to launder the proceeds of crime in silence.

== Fugitive ==
He was on the run since October 1994, after police, keeping him under surveillance, discovered him paying 13 billion lire ($8m) to import nearly a tonne of cocaine. After an initial couple of years in Brazil, he is believed to have settled in Uruguay in 2002, in the sea-side resort Punta del Este, carrying false Brazilian identity papers in the name of Francisco Capeletto.

== Arrest, escape and re-arrest ==
After 23 years on the run, Morabito was captured in a hotel in Montevideo in Uruguay on 4 September 2017, where he had moved after an argument with his wife. Police investigations had begun in the spring when Uruguayan investigators discovered that Morabito had enrolled his 13-year-old daughter in school with her father's real surname. When arrested, he was in possession of a gun, in addition to two cars, 13 mobile phones, and a dozen credit cards. He was expected to be extradited to Italy. Before the arrest, he had lived in a mansion in Punta del Este "where he was considered a model citizen, who devoted himself to his work in the soybean business and selling rural properties" according to a news report. Since he was also in possession of a passport in another name at the time of the arrest, he was initially charged with falsifying identity documents.

On 24 June 2019, Morabito escaped from the central penitentiary (Cárcel Central) of Montevideo with three other inmates "through a hole in the roof of the building". At the time, he was awaiting extradition to Italy, based on prior convictions made in absentia for links to organized crime and drug trafficking. He had left Italy in 1994 but prosecutors said he had continued to be a kingpin in trafficking of drugs between South America and Milan. After the escape, Interpol issued a red (high priority) notice for Morabito and the three others who were awaiting extradition to other countries.

Morabito was arrested again in the city of João Pessoa in Brazil on May 24, 2021, after being on the run for two years. The arrest was part of a joint operation involving Italian and Brazilian authorities, as well as the DEA, the Interpol and the FBI. Along with Morabito, the police arrested also Vincenzo Pasquino, born in Turin in 1990, and considered by the authorities a point of reference for international drug trafficking from South America.

=== Extradition ===
On July 6, 2022, Rocco Morabito was extradited back to Italy, after 28 years on the run. The extradition procedure was made possible thanks to the intense activity of connection between the Italian embassy in Brazil, the Interpol's "I-Can project" and the Brazilian authorities. Morabito will now have to serve a 30-year prison sentence in Italy.

== See also ==
- List of members of the 'Ndrangheta
- List of most wanted fugitives in Italy
