= Tommaso Besozzi =

Italian journalist and writer

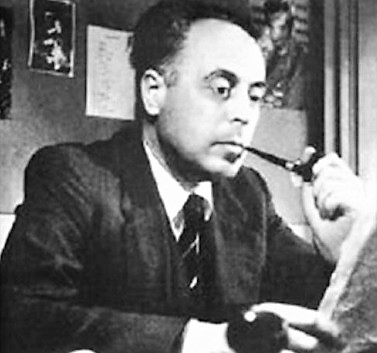
- Born: 20 January 1903; Vigevano, Italy
- Died: 18 November 1964 (aged 61); Rome, Italy
- Occupation: Journalist
- Known for: Investigative journalism

Tommaso Francesco Besozzi (20 January 1903 – 18 November 1964), also known as Tom, was an Italian journalist and writer. He is considered to be one of the most important post-war journalists of Italy and his writing style earned him the epithet "Hemingway of Europeo".

== Early life ==
Born in Vigevano in Lombardy, northern Italy, in a rather affluent family, he was one of four children; one sister and two brothers, who both were killed in World War I. He studied at university, first mathematics in Bologna and later at the Faculty of Arts in Pavia.

== Journalistic career ==
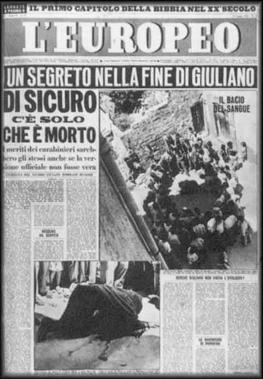
Cover of L'Europeo of July 1950 about the mysterious death of Giuliano

He started to work as a journalist for the Corriere della Sera in 1926 in Milan. In 1937 he reported from Ethiopia after the Italian invasion and occupation.

In 1947 he moved to the weekly magazine L'Europeo upon the recommendation of editor Arrigo Benedetti, for which he wrote important investigative reports. His style earned him the epithet “Hemingway of Europeo”. In an interview with Enrico Emanuelli in the 1950s, Hemingway said: "You also have one who writes like me: Tommaso Besozzi."

In February 1947 he wrote a historical article on the Istrian–Dalmatian exodus, when Italian citizens were leaving Pola, when the regions of Istria, Dalmatia, and Venezia Giulia, were handed over to Yugoslavia after the Paris Peace Treaty. In 1948 he established his name an investigative journalist, when he was able, after careful investigations, to exonerate an Italian emigrant in France, Gino Corni, sentenced to twenty years of forced labour for a murder he had not committed.

In 1948 he also published an article in L'Europeo, showing the misery and hunger of the people of Africo, in the Aspromonte mountains, in Calabria. The article was part of inquiry into the poverty in southern Italy for which Besozzi and Petrelli travelled in the region for a few months and included a reportage about the conditions in the suburbs of Naples. The article, entitled "Africo, symbol of disparity", and the series of documentary photographs by Tino Petrelli produced an outrage from national public opinion which, at the time, was rediscovering the dramatic situation of the "southern question".

In July 1950, he wrote an article about the mysterious death of the Sicilian bandit Salvatore Giuliano, shot and killed in Castelvetrano. According to the police, Giuliano died resisting arrest. However, Besozzi soon exposed the official version as fiction. The headline of the article read: "The only thing certain is that he is dead." The article is often mentioned as one of the examples of investigative journalism in Italy.

In the 1950s he returned to Africa as a special correspondent for L'Europeo and Gente. In his articles Besozzi recounted the tragedy of Italians during the post-colonization in East Africa, when the dream of colonial power had been shattered. He described the life of a few thousand deluded and abandoned Italians who did not want to go back to Italy, among them the truck drivers. He described their journeys, their lives, the characters they meet and the disjointed humanity they represent. The articles were later published in the book Il sogno del settimo viaggio (The dream of the seventh journey).

== Death and legacy ==
Lonesome, victim of a writer’s block, he committed suicide with a homemade bomb on 18 November 1964 in Rome. He is considered to be one of the most important post-war journalists of Italy. His impressionist approach to the narrative reportage could be considered a predecessor to what would become known as new journalism.

== Bibliography ==
- (in Italian) Mannucci, Enrico (ed.) (1995). I giornali non sono scarpe. Tommaso Besozzi una vita da prima pagina. Baldini Castoldi Dalai, ISBN 978-88-85989-97-9.
- (in Italian) Mannucci, Enrico (ed) (1999). Tommaso Besozzi. Il sogno del settimo viaggio. Rome: Fazi, ISBN 88-8112-123-9.
