= Quattroruote =

Italian automobile monthly magazine

- Italian Quattroruote. Cover release february 2011
- Categories: Automobile magazine
- Frequency: Monthly
- Publisher: Editoriale Domus
- First issue: January 1956 (n. 0)
- Country: Italy
- Based in: Rozzano
- Language: Italian
- Website: www.quattroruote.it
- ISSN: 0033-5916

Quattroruote (English: Four Wheels) is an Italian automobile magazine established by Marchigian entrepreneur Gianni Mazzocchi in February 1956. Over the years it has increased its reach by joint ventures with several other international publishers in countries such as Russia, China, Romania and England in 2007, where it launched a partnership with Top Gear (magazine). Among its regular features are monthly updated tables of used car prices.

== History and profile ==
Quattroruote was established by Gianni Mazzocchi in 1956. The publisher of the magazine is Editoriale Domus. Its head office is in Rozzano (MI), where the historical museum of the magazine is located. The magazine is published monthly and it offers news on road and track tests, price lists for new cars as well as quotations for used vehicles.

The magazine is also published in various countries, including China and Russia which was launched in 2006.

== Circulation ==
Quattroruote had a circulation of 596,742 copies between September 1993 and August 1994. The circulation of the magazine was 464,000 copies in 2004. Between February 2006 and January 2007 the magazine sold 450,500 copies. It was the first best-selling automobile magazine in Italy in 2007 with a circulation of 425,539 copies. The magazine had a circulation of 354,735 copies in 2010, making it the fourth best-selling European automobile magazine and the absolute best selling in Italy.

== The Automotive Safety Centre ==
The test-track belonging to the magazine is located in Vairano di Vidigulfo (PV). The Automotive Safety Centre, opened in 1995, is 4500 m long, with an 1800 m main straight, where acceleration tests are carried out. During these tests it is possible to reach 300 km/h. The race track has been approved by FIA for Formula One tests.

=== The handling track ===
The handling track, connected to the speed test area and used for handling test of vehicles, has bends and chicanes of different radii where oversteer and understeer of vehicles can be examined.

=== SUV test area ===
The SUV test area is next to the ASC straight section, where off-road vehicle driving and overturning characteristics are established.

== Safe driving ==
Quattroruote organizes safe driving courses on an area of about 17000 m² where students, followed by expert instructors, are taught driving techniques on wet or dry surfaces, handling and stopping.

== Events ==
=== Quattroruote Day ===
Anniversary of the first issue of the principal magazine, the 2006 (fiftieth) and 2016 (sixtieth) Quattroruote Days are represented by much merchandise and advertising.

=== TG Cup/GT Cup ===
It is a yearly racing festival/race organized by Quattroruote. Up until 2015, it was organised in partnership with Top Gear and would feature The Stig. Rebranded as GT Cup from 2015 on.

=== Rome Top Gear event ===
Organised by Editoriale Domus and Quattroruote, and set also in Poland, is an international car exhibition in Rome.

== Books ==
One of the most significant of Quattroruote's book series is the famous Tutte le auto del mondo ("All the cars of the world", sometimes stylized as Tutte le Auto del Mondo) or "TaM", any issue of this series was for sale any year, with the death of its "director" in Lido di Jesolo (in the Province of Venice), this books was not more published.

In 2006, Quattroruote published the book Pericolo, attraversamento rane! (Danger, frogs crossing!), collecting various photographs related to vehicles and roads, with funny comments.

== See also ==
- List of magazines in Italy
