= Panfilo Gentile =

Italian politician

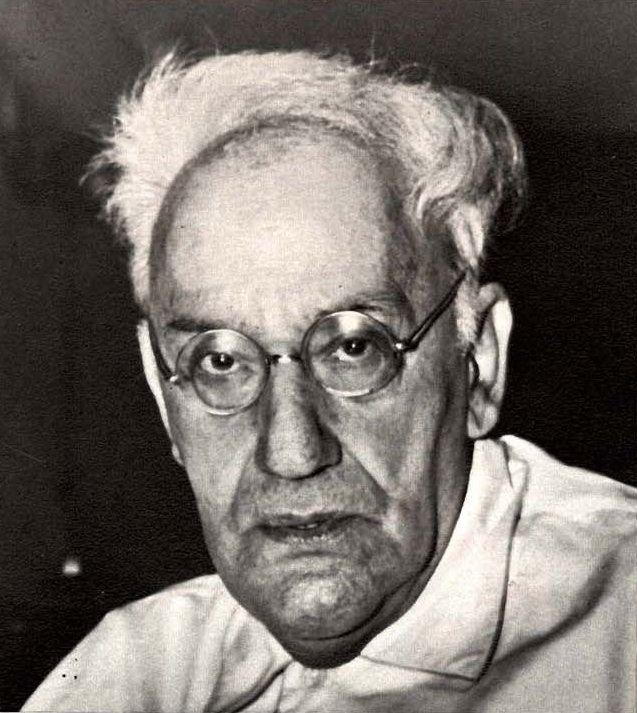
- Panfilo Gentile Epoca magazine, 1969
- Born: 28 May 1889; L'Aquila, Abruzzo, Italy
- Died: 6 July 1971; Rome, Italy
- Occupation(s): lawyer journalist writer politician
- Spouse(s): 1. Eva Barbaro di Francavilla (-1964); 2. Roberta Roversi (1941-)
- Parent(s): Vincenzo Gentile; Giuseppina Giorgi

Panfilo Gentile (28 May 1889 – 6 July 1971) was an Italian journalist, writer and politician.

Another notable journalist, Sergio Romano, wrote of Gentile that he had an irrepressible tendency to deconstruct fashionable ideas, to puncture the balloons of political rhetoric and systematically to destroy received wisdoms.

== Life ==
Panfilo Gentile was born in L'Aquila, an ancient city in the mountains between Rome and the Adriatic Sea. He was the eldest son of Vincenzo Gentile, prominent in the area as a lawyer and politician, by his marriage to Giuseppina Giorgi. Panfilo trained as a lawyer. However, rather than following in his father's footsteps, he studied Philosophy with Giorgio Del Vecchio and, while still young, became an unattached philosophy lecturer, later teaching his chosen subject at Bologna and, later, at Naples. Between 1911 and 1913 he worked on L'Unità, a relatively short-lived weekly publication focused on the arts and politics, founded and run by Gaetano Salvemini. He later became a contributor to the socialist daily newspaper, l'Avanti!.

In July 1914 Gentile was an adherent of the neutralist position, speaking out against Italian participation in the war. In 1917/18 he moved from Bologna to Naples where the climate was more benevolent in the context of the respiratory problems he was having. After the war he moved again, to Rome, where he worked as a literary critic on "Il Paese", a daily newspaper set up by Francesco Scozzese which defined itself, at least in part, through its opposition to Mussolini's newspaper, "Il Popolo d'Italia". During this time he wrote less about the legal themes that had been at the heart of his early published work, turning instead to the history of religions and the origins of Christianity. In 1923 the publishers Laterza published his ambitious "Summary of a philosophy of religion" ("Sommario d'una filosofia della religione").

Hostile to the Mussolini régime, which extended its control of the country during 1924 and 1925, Gentile backed the "Manifesto of the Anti-Fascist Intellectuals" ("Manifesto degli intellettuali antifascisti") which Benedetto Croce produced in May 1925. Setting aside his university career, he concentrated now on working as a legal advocate, defending both in the traditional courts and in the "Special courts for the defence of the State" which were a feature of the Italian justice system between 1926 and 1943.

Directly after the Second World War, with Leone Cattani and others, Gentile co-founded the Independent Liberal Movement ("Movimento Liberale Indipendente" / MLI), comprising a liberal breakaway group from the recently re-founded Liberal Party ("Partito Liberale Italiano" / PLI) combined with the Democratic Socialist elements. The idea was to create a "third force" in Italian politics and form a democratic counter-weight to the Christian Democrats. The movement lasted approximately three years. In elections the anti-communist majority repeatedly favoured Christian Democratic candidates. There being no space found in the political spectrum for the MLI, its elements returned to their respective Liberal and Socialist origins while the Christian Democrats dominated the political scene nationally for the next half century. During this period, in 1946, Panfilo Gentile was a member of the National Consultation [assembly] ("Consulta Nazionale"), a short-lived appointed "pre-parliament" mandated to create the basis for a return to democratic government. However, his more notable contributions to history come from his work as a writer and journalist.

He wrote for the Risorgimento Liberale newspaper from its inception in August 1943, shortly after the collapse of the Fascist regime, till November 1947 when he left in a disagreement over political tactics during a reconfiguration of the political centre in Italy.

Between 1949 and 1951 Gentile was a member of the editorial team on Il Mondo, a weekly magazine devoted to politics, economics and culture. His own contributions, which appeared under the pseudonym "Averroè" included a political diary and were characterised by a passionate defence of free market economics, invoking the philosophical stance of Friedrich Hayek and his economist allies. For half a year, between April and October 1952, Gentile ran the Florence based daily newspaper La Nazione in succession to Sandro Volta. After this he was recruited by Mario Missiroli to write for Corriere della Sera: he stayed till 1966, the year of his seventy-seventh birthday. At Corriere he sustained his economic liberal credentials, while becoming increasingly critical of the interventionist solutions advocated by political left. Along with this, his writing was characterised by increasing pessimism about Italian politics.

During the 1960s he produced a succession of increasingly shrill political critiques, such as "Polemic against my own times" ("Polemica contro il mio tempo" - 1965), "Displeasing opinions" ("Opinioni sgradevoli" - 1968) and "Mafia democracy" ("Democrazie mafiose" - 1969). Penfilo Gentile's down-beat evaluation was of modern democracies dominated by party machines, incapable of promoting real talent, and programmed to construct, especially in Italy, oligarchic dictatorship masquerading as political pluralism. With grim lucidity he captured he degenerative aspects of the Italian politics. Gentile's pugnacious writing was characterised by Sartre as "imposter philosophy" and Herbert Marcuse called him a "livid polemicist".
