= Camilla Cederna =

Italian journalist and writer (1911–1997)

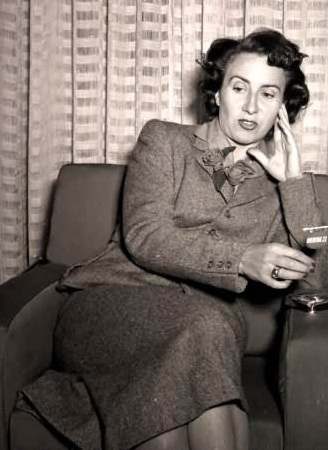

Camilla Cederna (21 January 1911 – 5 November 1997) was an Italian writer and editor. She is said to have introduced investigative journalism to the Italian news media. Some sources give her year of birth as 1921. Cederna was born and grew up in Milan. She was daughter of Giulio Cederna, a business manager and footballer, and brother to Antonio Cederna, a co-founder of Italia Nostra.

Cederna studied Classic Literature at the University of Milan. In 1941, she helped founding the magazine L'Europeo. From 1958 to 1980, she was an editor and reporter for L'Espresso; in 1980, she joined Panorama magazine as an editor and columnist. Her 1943 article La moda nera ("Black Fashion") about the clothes worn by women in the Italian fascist movement, originally published in Corriere della Sera on 7 September, led to her being put in prison.

Cerderna is perhaps best known for her 1978 book Giovanni Leone: la carriera di un presidente (Giovanni Leone: The Career of a President), where she accused Italian president Giovanni Leone of being involved in a Lockheed bribery scandal; Leone was forced to resign but he later successfully sued Cederna for libel. She died of cancer in Rome in 1997.

== Selected works ==
Sources:

- Noi siamo le signore (We Are the Ladies) (1958)
- La voce dei padroni (The Voices of the Bosses) (1962)
- 8 1/2 di Federico Fellini (1963)
- Pinelli. Una finestra sulla strage (Pinelli: A Window on the Carnage) (1971), on the death of railroad worker and anarchist Giuseppe Pinelli
- Sparare a vista. Come la polizia del regime DC mantiene l'ordine pubblico (Shooting on Sight: How the Police of the Christian Democratic Government Maintain Order) (1975)
- Il mondo di Camilla, autobiography (1980)
- Casa nostra (1983)
- De gustibus (1986)
