= Il Mondo (magazine) =

Defunct weekly political magazine in Italy (1949–2014)

- Cover of Il Mondo, 24 August 1979
- Editor: Gianni Mazzocchi
- Categories: Newsmagazine
- Frequency: Weekly
- First issue: 19 February 1949
- Final issue: February 2014
- Company: Rizzoli
- Country: Italy
- Based in: Rome
- Language: Italian

Il Mondo (Italian: The World) was a weekly political, cultural and economic magazine founded by Gianni Mazzocchi (also founder of L'Europeo) and directed by Mario Pannunzio. It existed between 1949 and 2014.

== History and profile ==
The founding group, consisting of Mario Pannunzio (managing director), Vittorio Gorresio, Ennio Flaiano, Corrado Alvaro, Mino Maccari and Vitaliano Brancati, had already worked together in the weekly magazine Omnibus (1937–1939).

Il Mondo was founded in 1949. The first issue of the magazine was released on 19 February 1949, with articles against the welfare state and Keynesian economics. In economics, the magazine was inspired by the economic theories of Ludwig von Mises and Friedrich Hayek. It adopted a leftist-liberal approach. Initially born as an anti-communist and laicist periodical, during the years it maintained a line of total independence from "the powers that be" in politics and finance. People writing for Il Mondo included Adolfo Battaglia, Ennio Flaiano, Ernesto Rossi, Giovanni Spadolini, Enzo Forcella, Antonio Cederna, Roberto Pane, Marco Pannella, Eugenio Scalfari, Tommaso Landolfi, Indro Montanelli, Vittorio De Caprariis and Panfilo Gentile. Writers Thomas Mann and George Orwell were among the foreign contributors. The headquarters of the weekly was in Rome.

In the early years the average circulation was between 15,000 and 18,000 copies, with a peak of 20,000. In the period between 1952 and 1953 the number of the pages was 12. In 1955 Pannunzio brought the pages of the magazine from 12 to 16 pages, while in 1956, the publisher decided to bring back Il Mondo to 12 pages. In September the magazine was yielded to a company whose main shareholders were Nicolò Carandini and Adriano Olivetti. The magazine closed in March 1966.

=== Relaunch and definitive closing ===
In 1969 Rizzoli acquired the rights for the magazine, and relaunched it as a Time-format news magazine. After a few years, Il Mondo went from a weekly news magazine to a specializing in economics publication, something groundbreaking for the time in Italy. In the 1990s it began the long agony, and in the final period the magazine was sold as a supplement of the Corriere della Sera. The magazine was published weekly on Fridays.

From December 2002 to November 2003 the average circulation of Il Mondo was 94,729 copies. The magazine sold 78,430 copies in 2007.

Il Mondo finally closed in February 2014.

== See also ==
- List of magazines in Italy
