= Leo Valiani =

Italian historian, politician, and journalist (1909–1999)

Senator for life Leo Valiani
- Leó Weiczen
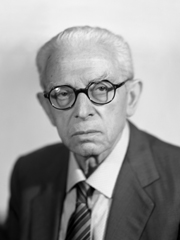

Member of the Senate of the Republic
- Life tenure 12 January 1980 – 18 September 1999
- Appointed by: Sandro Pertini

Personal details
- Born: 9 February 1909 Rijeka, Austria-Hungary
- Died: 18 September 1999 (aged 90) Milan, Italy
- Citizenship: Italy
- Party: PCdI (1928–1939); PdA (1943–1947); PR (1956–1962); PRI (1980s)
- Occupation: Journalist and historian

Leo Valiani (9 February 1909 – 18 September 1999) was an Italian historian, politician, and journalist.

== Early life ==
Valiani was born Leó Weiczen in Fiume (now Rijeka), on the Adriatic Sea (then in the Hungary part of Austria-Hungary, now in Croatia), to a Hungarian Jewish family. His surname would be forcibly Italianized, from Weiczen to Valiani, by the Fascist Italy regime in 1927. In later childhood, Valiani lived in Trieste, and later in the Kingdom of Italy.

== Career and activities ==
A member of the Giustizia e Libertà organization, Valiani was sentenced in 1930 to five years in prison for anti-fascist acts he had committed in the 1920s. Valiani left for exile in the French Third Republic once he was released, before leaving for the Second Spanish Republic, where he fought during the Spanish Civil War on the side of the Republican faction. In 1939, after the defeat by the Nationalist faction of Francisco Franco, he fled to France where he was detained as a political prisoner in Camp Vernet together with Arthur Koestler, who wrote about it in his book Scum of the Earth, before later fleeing to Mexico.

Originally a communist and member of the Communist Party of Italy, Valiani started to question Joseph Stalin's policies and his treatment of Leon Trotsky's followers during the Spanish Civil War. He broke with the party in 1939 after the Molotov–Ribbentrop Pact. In 1943, the British Special Operations Executive sent Valiani secretly behind enemy lines in Italy across the unstable front between the Allied and Axis forces to Rome. He moved northward to work with Italian resistance movement leader Ferruccio Parri and with Milan's anti-fascist National Liberation Committee. Valiani represented resistance leaders at meetings in Switzerland with American intelligence officers of the Office of Strategic Services, including Allen W. Dulles.

Valiani joined the Action Party of Parri. As a leader of the resistance to fascism in the north, Valiani helped organise the final partisan uprising in April 1945, and put his signature to the document ordering the execution of the captured fascist dictator Benito Mussolini. He was elected to the Italian Constituent Assembly in 1946 for the Action Party. When that party faded away — its social-democratic and liberal socialist ideals trampled under the conflicting interests of the larger Italian Communist and Christian Democracy parties — he took refuge in historical studies.

Valiani edited a special issue of Il Ponte on Yugoslavia in 1955. He adhered to the Radical Party from 1956 to 1962 and to the Italian Republican Party in the 1980s. He considered journalism as his true career. He wrote for the news weekly L'Espresso for 35 years and collaborated with Il Mondo and the Corriere della Sera. Sandro Pertini, the then Italian president, named him senator for life in 1980.

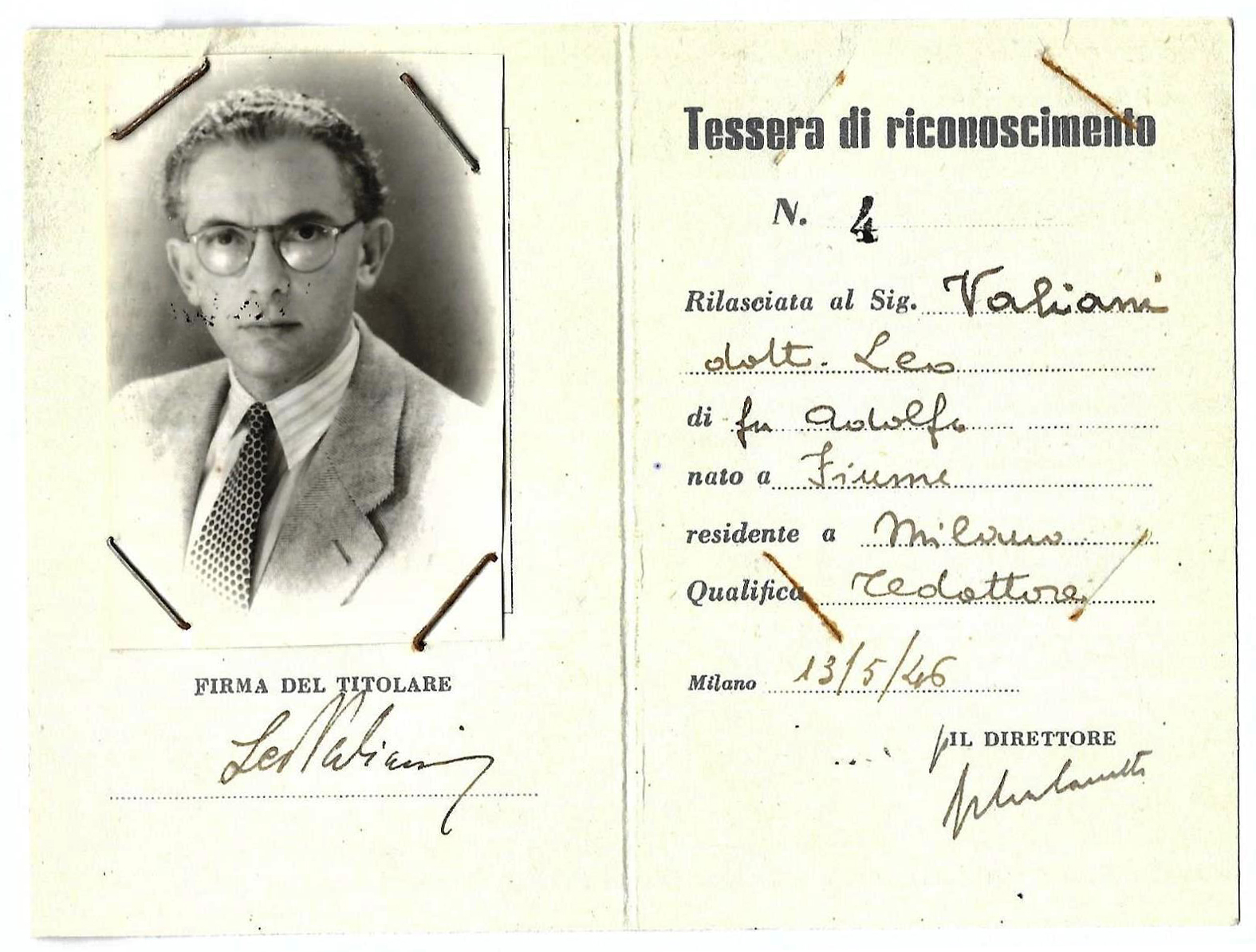
1946 work ID issued to former partisan Leo Valiani.

== Death ==
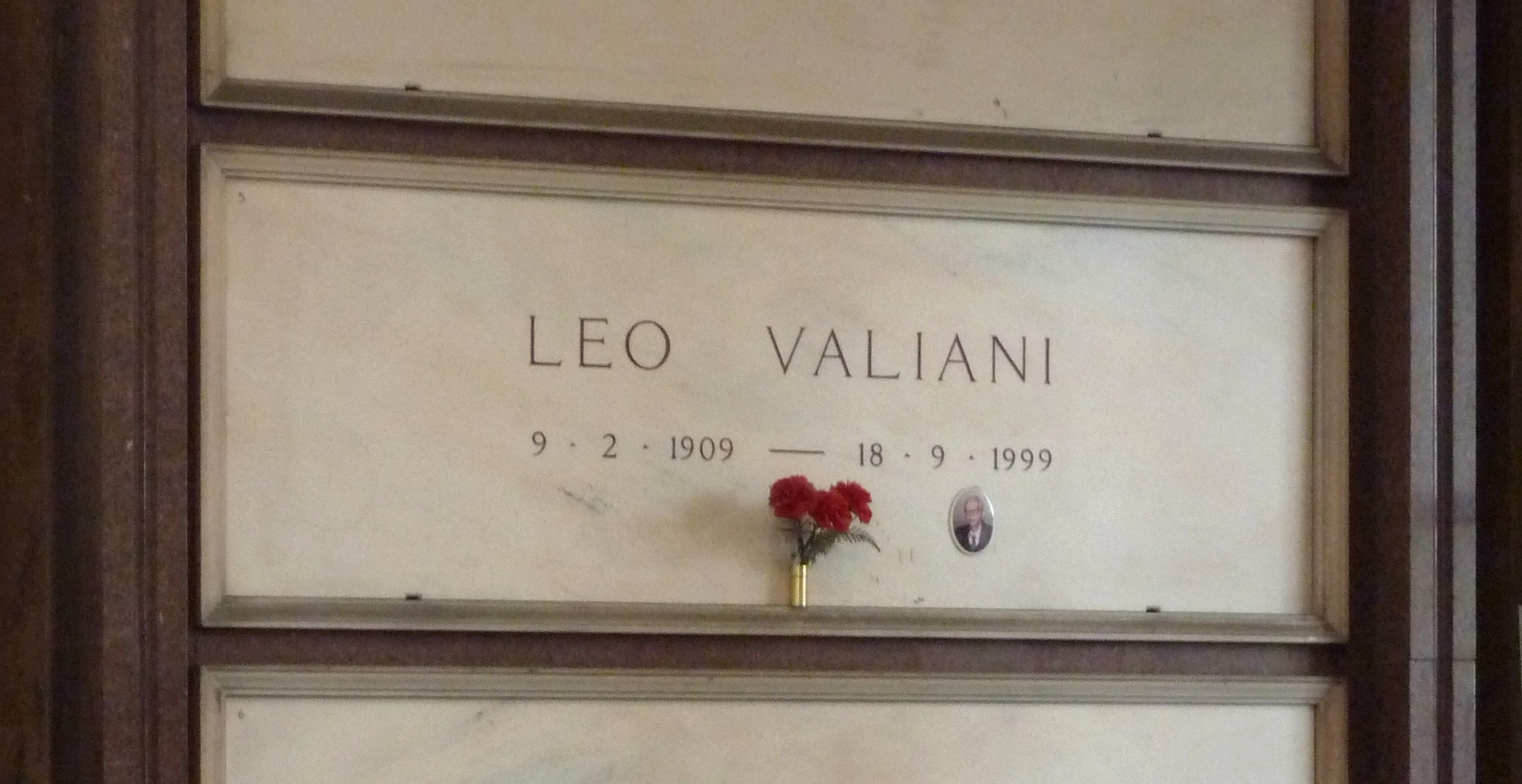
Valiani's grave at the Cimitero Monumentale in Milan, Italy, in 2015

Valiani died in Milan on 18 September 1999, aged 90, and he was buried at the Cimitero Monumentale, in the main chapel of the cemetery.
