= Oggi (magazine) =

Italian weekly news magazine

- Editor-in-chief: Umberto Brindani
- Former editors: Mario Pannunzio Arigo Benedetti
- Categories: News magazine
- Frequency: Weekly
- Publisher: RCS Periodici
- First issue: 1 June 1939; 86 years ago
- Company: RCS MediaGroup
- Country: Italy
- Based in: Milan
- Language: Italian
- Website: www.oggi.it

Oggi (Italian for 'Today') is an Italian weekly news magazine published in Milan. Founded in 1939, it is one of the oldest magazines still under publication in the country.

== History and profile ==
Oggi was established in Milan in June 1939. The magazine was modelled on the American magazine Life. The early editors were Mario Pannunzio and Arigo Benedetti. It was closed down in 1942 due to pressure from Fascists.

The magazine was restarted in July 1945. From its restart in 1945 to 1956 the magazine was edited by Edilio Rusconi. Pino Belleri and Vittorio Buttafava are among the former editors-in-chief of the weekly.

Oggi is owned by the RCS media group and is published weekly by RCS Periodici, a subsidiary of the group. The magazine is edited by Umberto Brindani.

At the beginning of the 1950s Oggi had a monarchist political stance and targeted people from all social classes. The weekly is one of the Italian magazines which published Lady Diana's photographs in her final moments in September 1997.

== Circulation ==
Oggi was one of the most read magazines in Italy with a circulation of 760,000 copies in the late 1940s. The magazine sold 450,000–500,000 copies in the period 1952–1953. In the mid-1960s the circulation of the magazine was 699,000 copies. By 1968 the magazine sold 848,000 copies. Its circulation rose to 950,000 copies in 1970.

The weekly had a circulation of 550,740 copies in 1984. It rose to 728,533 copies between September 1993 and August 1994.

In 2001 Oggi had a circulation of 748,000 copies. From December 2002 to November 2003 the average circulation of the magazine was 708,940 copies. Its circulation fell to 675,000 copies in 2004. The 2007 circulation of the magazine was 623,679 copies. In 2010 the magazine had a circulation of 511,539 copies. Its circulation during the first half of 2013 was 66,045 copies.

== See also ==
- List of magazines in Italy
