= Africo =

Africo Άφρικο (Greek)
- Comune
- Comune di Africo
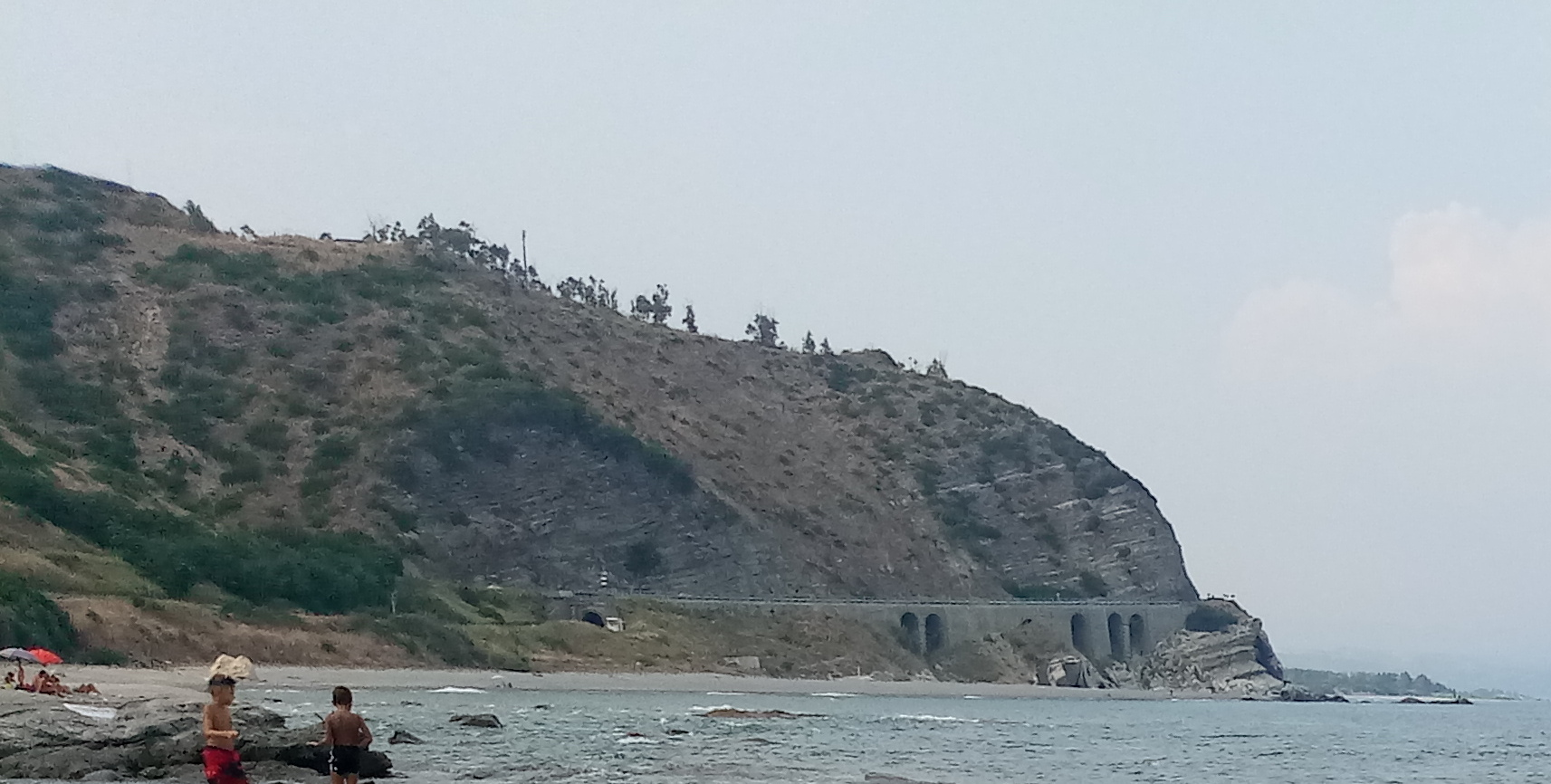
- View of Africo Nuovo

- Coat of arms

- Location of Africo in Italy Africo (Calabria)
- Coordinates: 38°03′N 16°8′E
- Country: Italy
- Region: Calabria
- Metropolitan city: Reggio Calabria (RC)

Government
  - Mayor: Domenico Versaci

Area
  - Total: 51 km^{2} (20 sq mi)
- Elevation: 15 m (49 ft)

Population (January 1, 2009)
  - Total: 3,339
  - Density: 65/km^{2} (170/sq mi)
- Demonym: Africesi
- Time zone: UTC+1 (CET)
  - Summer (DST): UTC+2 (CEST)
- Postal code: 89030
- Dialing code: 0964
- Patron saint: Saint Leo
- Saint day: May 12

Africo (Calabrian: Africu; Calabrian Greek: Άφρικο, romanized: Aphriko) is a comune in the province of Reggio Calabria, in the Southern Italian region of Calabria located 74 kilometres (46 mi) from Reggio Calabria.

Africo consists of two main centers. The first, Africo Vecchio (Old Africo), is located some 15 kilometres (9 mi) in the mainland at the feet of the Aspromonte. The old town was destroyed by disastrous floods and landslides in October 1951 and abandoned. The second, Africo Nuovo (New Africo), was reconstructed around 15 kilometres (9 mi) away, on the Ionian coast near Bianco. The remnants of the old town are situated in the Aspromonte National Park.

== History ==
The origin of the name is unclear. According to some scholars, the name may have derived from the Latin name apricus (airy and sunny) which is from the Greek aprokos. Others believe it comes from the Latin africus (ventus), winds from Africa. Άφρικο (Aphriko) in Greek means deriving from Africa, possibly meaning the South-Westernly wind coming to the region from the Libyan Desert. The village of Africo was inhabitted by Griko people, known as Grecanici in Calabria. The Grecanici are a Greek ethnic and linguistic minority in the Calabria region of Italy, remnants of a population that has resided there since late antiquity. The Grecanic language was lost in Africo during the late 19th century and was replaced by Calabrian.

In 1571 Gabriele Barrio writes that in Africo the Sacred Rites were celebrated in Greek and that the population also used Greek in family relationships, together with Italo-Romance languages. At the end of the 18th century, the Greek Byzantine Rite was still observed there. In the 19th century the inhabitants of Africo abandoned the Greek Rite as well as the Greek language. The dialect of Africo is of the neo-Latin type, but with several words of Greek origin: for example the name of the stream Aposcipo derives from the Greek Απόσχεπος (Apòskepos = "not protected"). However, Africo is not currently part of the Grecanic speaking area. Its inhabitants are called Africesi or Africoti.

=== Africo Vecchio ===
Street scene of the town of Africo in 1948 (Photo: Tino Petrelli)

The old centre was founded around the 9th century by inhabitants from Delia or Deri. In 1195 the town became a fief of the Archbishop of Reggio Calabria granted by the king of Sicily, Henry VI. It remained so until the end of feudalism in Calabria in 1806.

An earthquake in 1783, partially destroyed the town, killing six people. Earthquakes in 1905 and 1908 again hit the town.

Africo has become the symbol of hunger, floods, wandering and the dispersion of the inhabitants of inland Calabria. The Italian journalist Adolfo Rossi visited Africo in 1901, when he was following the footprints of the notorious brigand Giuseppe Musolino. He was shocked by the misery and squalor of the place, where "the cabins are not houses being used as pig sties, but pig sties used as houses for humans". In 1931 the Calabrian writer Corrado Alvaro described a famine which had afflicted Africo. In 1946, Umberto Zanotti Bianco published a book on the people of Africo, Tra la perduta gente (Amongst the lost peoples) describing the dire conditions and hunger. At the time the village could only be reached by a 6/7 hour ride on a mule.

In 1948 the journalist Tommaso Besozzi and photographer Tino Petrelli published a report in the magazine L’Europeo, showing the misery and hunger of the people of Africo. The article, entitled Africo, symbol of disparity, and the series of documentary photographs produced an outrage from national public opinion which, at the time, was rediscovering the dramatic situation of the "southern question". The inhabitants of Africo left their village from 1949 onwards and moved to new houses built along the Ionian coast, to New Africo.

=== Africo Nuovo ===
On October 15–18, 1951, floods and landslides destroyed the old Africo and the nearby hamlet Casalinuovo. People were evacuated to Bova Marina, Reggio Calabria and Fiumara di Muro. Africo Nuovo has been constructed around 15 kilometres (9 mi) away from the old town, on the Ionian coast, near Bianco.

The town is home to the 'Ndrangheta, a Mafia-type criminal organisation based in Calabria. Several of the criminal clans are sometimes involved in bloody feuds.

== Economy ==
In Africo Vecchio (Old Africo), the economy of the village was mainly sheep farming, also practiced was the breeding of silkworms, reflecting the Greek origin of the village. In Africo Nuovo (New Africo), the economy is based on agriculture and greenhouses for the cultivation of fruits, the production of cement, and forestry. Tourism is, to date, poorly exploited even though it has enormous potential.

== Demographic evolution ==
Historical population

Year	Pop.	±%
1861	1,346	—
1871	1,431	+6.3%
1881	1,780	+24.4%
1901	1,812	+1.8%
1911	1,819	+0.4%

Year	Pop.	±%
1921	1,868	+2.7%
1931	2,008	+7.5%
1936	2,189	+9.0%
1951	2,542	+16.1%
1961	3,304	+30.0%

Year	Pop.	±%
1971	3,518	+6.5%
1981	3,543	+0.7%
1991	3,223	−9.0%
2001	3,465	+7.5%
2009	3,339	−3.6%

Source: Data from ISTAT

== Notable people ==
- Costantino Favasuli (born 2004), footballer
- Giuseppe Morabito (born 1934), Italian mobster and 'Ndrangheta boss
- Rocco Morabito (born 1966), Italian mobster and 'Ndrangheta boss
