= Locride =

Locride is an area of Calabria, Italy around the town of Locri in the Province of Reggio Calabria. The term takes origin from the Locris, an ancient Greek region.

It is divided into 5 areas:

- Vallata dello Stilaro
- Vallata del Torbido
- Epizefiri
- Vallata del Bonamico
- Heracleum

== See also ==
- Bovesia
- Costa Viola
- Grande Reggio
- Piana di Gioia Tauro
- Costa dei gelsomini
- Locris
- Italian page
