= L'Europeo =

Italian periodical magazine

- Claudia Cardinale on the cover of L'Europeo, February 1960
- Editor: Arrigo Benedetti
- Categories: News magazine
- Frequency: Weekly
- Founded: 1945
- Final issue: 1995, 2013
- Company: Rizzoli
- Country: Italy
- Language: Italian
- ISSN: 0014-3189

L'Europeo was a prominent Italian weekly news magazine launched on 4 November 1945, by the founder-editors Gianni Mazzocchi and Arrigo Benedetti. Camilla Cederna was also among the founders. The magazine stopped publication in 1995. The title returned to the news-stands in 2001 and 2002 as a quarterly, then as a bi-monthly from 2003 to 2007 and a monthly from 2008, until closure in 2013.

== Orientation ==
L'Europeo is described as independent, secular-oriented and liberal, and the most authoritative in its genre. It combined news, politics, arts, true crime stories and the world of entertainment. The magazine was established in 1945 and had its heyday in the mid-1940s, 1950s and 1960s. Starting with a circulation of 20,000 it was selling 300,000 copies by 1947.

The magazine paid special attention to photographic image and documentary photography in the tradition of Life magazine in the United States. According to Benedetti: "People look at articles, but read the photos" (Gli articoli si guardano, le fotografie si leggono).

Directed mainly at a middle-class and family readership it was slightly more culturally elevated than its popular rival, Epoca. Its political orientation was centrist, but it was also one of the few magazines during the Cold War willing to openly have dialogue with the Italian Communist Party.

L'Europeo had a circulation of 127,422 copies in 1984.

== Scoops ==
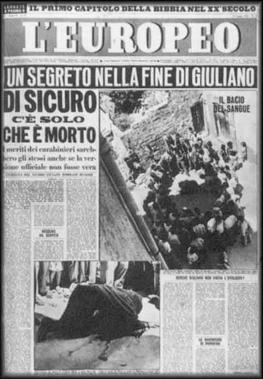
Cover of L'Europeo of July 1950 about the mysterious death of Giuliano

Focussing on news and current affairs, the magazine achieved some impressive scoops, one of the most memorable being Tommaso Besozzi's investigative report in July 1950 on the mysterious death of the Sicilian bandit Salvatore Giuliano, which convincingly disproved official accounts of how the bandit had died. The now famous headline of the article read: "The only thing certain is that he is dead."

In March 1954 the magazine denounced the U.S. ambassador in Rome, Clare Boothe Luce, of intrusion into Italian internal politics in a speech she made in January at the Mayflower Hotel in Washington. She had mentioned electoral fraud perpetrated by the left at the June 1953 elections, advising the government on how to fight the communists. After the denial of Mrs. Luce, a dispute broke out among various journalists including Nicola Adelfi, author of the first scoop, the famous Indro Montanelli, and Benedetti himself.

In 1953 the Rizzoli publishing company bought the publication, when during the Korean War the original publisher was no longer able to cover rising expenses. The price of paper surged from 100 to 280 lire per kilogram. The original editor Benedetti left the magazine and launched a new weekly, L'Espresso, in 1955.

Known journalists that worked for the magazine in the so-called "Benedetti school of journalism" were Tommaso Besozzi, Enzo Biagi, Giorgio Bocca, Oriana Fallaci, and Indro Montanelli, as well as photographers such as Federico Scianna and Oliviero Toscani. Novelist Alberto Moravia wrote weekly film reviews from 1950–1954.

Controversial journalist Oriana Fallaci began her career with L'Europeo. First with celebrity interviews, covering Hollywood in the 1950s and 1960s, but progressing rapidly to war correspondent, covering the Vietnam War and the Middle East. In 1968, she was shot as she was covering an army massacre of student protesters in Mexico. In the years 1969 to 1972 L'Europeo published a series of her challenging interviews with prominent politicians such as Golda Meir, Indira Gandhi, Henry Kissinger, Yasser Arafat, Deng Xiaoping, Fidel Castro, and Ayatollah Khomeini. The interviews were often translated and published in the world's most prestigious publications. She harangued Kissinger into calling the Vietnam War "useless". Kissinger once said that the interview with Fallaci was "the single most disastrous conversation I ever had with a member of the press".

== Decline ==
Its decline started in the second half of the 1970s, when Tommaso Giglio left as chief editor in 1976. He wanted to compete with L'Espresso and Panorama but the publisher was not willing to invest the necessary money. Due to falling sales during the late 1970s, the magazine changed to a small format in 1981. By the early 1990s it regained some ground but was eventually forced to close in 1995. The last issue, in the spring of 1995, was a 'special' in the same format and graphic design as the first large news format.

== See also ==
Media related to L'Europeo at Wikimedia Commons

- List of magazines in Italy
