= Tango (Italian magazine) =

Italian satirical magazine

- Type: Weekly
- Editor: Sergio Staino
- Founded: 10 March 1986
- Ceased publication: 3 October 1988
- Political alignment: Satire

Tango was a satirical insert of the Italian Communist newspaper l'Unità.

== History ==
The first satirical insert of an Italian newspaper, it was founded by Bobo creator Sergio Staino and followed the style of the major Italian satirical magazine Il Male, of which it brought together numerous collaborators. Mostly consisting of cartoons and comics, among the collaborators of the magazine were Andrea Pazienza, Stefano Benni, Michele Serra, Domenico Starnone, Gino e Michele, Francesco Guccini, Roberto Vecchioni, Francesco De Gregori, Vincino, Altan, Ellekappa, Massimo Cavezzali, Renato Calligaro, Angese, Enzo Lunari, Paolo Hendel, David Riondino, Lella Costa.

The magazine raised several controversies, particularly with "Nattango", a cartoon depicting the then Communist secretary Alessandro Natta naked and dancing; originally a polemical response to the Corriere della Sera editorial cartoonist Giorgio Forattini, who had accused the magazine of Communist propaganda and challenged it to publish a cartoon on Natta, it became a political case, with, among others, the Italian Socialist Party leader Bettino Craxi describing it as "inconceivable" and "cretinous and questionable humour".

The magazine's original four pages doubled into eight in the early 1988. Following the death of Pazienza and the major involvement of Staino in the film Cavalli si nasce, Tango ended its publications on 3 October 1988. It was replaced three months later by Cuore.

== See also ==
- List of magazines in Italy

== Bibliography ==
- Chiesa, Adolfo (1988). Di male in tango (in Italian). Epoca.
- Franchi, Stefania (2000). Tango e il PCI: comunisti e satira nell'Italia del dopoguerra (in Italian). Rubbettino. ISBN 978-88-7284-949-1.
