= Lillo Venezia =

Italian journalist (1950–2020)

Calogero Venezia, known as Lillo Venezia (24 February 1950 – 24 March 2020) was an Italian journalist.

== Biography ==
Born in Mazara del Vallo in 1950, his real name was Calogero, but he was known to everyone as Lillo Venezia. He lived in Syracuse, where he studied at the Gargallo classical high school, and then in Catania where he attended University.

In 1977 he went to Rome to work on the editorial board of the newspaper Lotta Continua, and it was he who wrote and signed the correspondence of May 10 from Cinisi about the death of Peppino Impastato.

For a long time he was director of Il Male, one of the most innovative satire magazines in Italy, founded in Rome in 1977, along with young politicized satirists such as Pino Zac, Vincino, Angese, Enzo Sferra, Jacopo Fo, Cinzia Leone, graphic designer Francesco Cascioli and writers Angelo Pasquini, Sergio Saviane, Alain Denis, Roberto Perini, Riccardo Mannelli, Vauro Senesi.

Lillo Venezia was the second Italian journalist to be imprisoned after World War II (a few days in Regina Coeli) after Giovannino Guareschi, following a complaint for insulting religion and a foreign head of state (the Pope). Some copies of the newspaper were burned in the square by the parish priest of Spilimbergo, who judged it "worthy of falling in the magma of our Italic volcanoes, a congenial seat for similar obsessive publications".

He was among the most important authors of the anti-mafia newspaper I Siciliani; after the murder of founder Giuseppe Fava, he was part of the group of editors who kept the newspaper alive, along with Riccardo Orioles, Claudio Fava and others. Venezia was the author of the last interview with judge Rocco Chinnici, before the latter was assassinated by the Mafia.

In 2011 he became director of Il Male di Vauro e Vincino, a new satire magazine inspired by Il Male and founded by Vauro and Vincino.

Venezia died in the Garibaldi Hospital in Catania on 24 March 2020, aged 70, of COVID-19, during the pandemic in Italy.
