= 1979 in comics =

Notable events of 1979 in comics.

== Events ==
=== January ===
- January 6: The first episode of Pat Mills and Joe Colquhoun's Charley's War is prepublished in Battle Picture Weekly and the series will run until October 1986.
- January 17: In Il Male, the demented space adventurer Joe Galaxy makes his debut in a two-strip story (Joe Galassia e le perfide Lucertole di Callisto IV) by Massimo Mattioli.
- January 24: In issue #330 The Mighty World of Marvel, changes its name to Marvel Comic. (Marvel UK)
- January 28: In Il giornalino, Una tequila señor by Giuliano Longhi and Renato Polese marks the debut of the West Angels, a trio of easy-going bounty-hunters.
- The final Asterix story written by René Goscinny, Asterix in Belgium, drawn by Albert Uderzo is published. It also ran in Le Monde as a serial.

=== February ===
- February 20: Kees Kousemaker and his wife Evelien publish Wordt Vervolgd. Stripleksikon der Lage Landen, the follow-up to their earlier comics encyclopaedia Strip voor Strip (1979).
- February 22: In Spirou, the first chapter of the Yoko Tsuno story La lumiere d’Ixo, by Roger Leloup, is published.
- February 26: In Pif Gadget, Les Robinsons de la Terre (The Planet Earth’s Robinson) by Roger Lécureux and Alfonso Font makes its debut.
- First issue of Cliff (Editoriale Corno), by Luciano Secchi; the series, a sort of Italian version of Hulk, lasts just 16 numbers.

=== March ===
- March 6: In Tintin, the first chapter of the Alix story L' Enfant Grec (The Greek children) by Jacques Martin, is published.
- March 7: In the TV show SuperGulp, Bonvi's Marzolino Tarantola makes his debut.
- March 23 : In Tintin the first chapter of the Ric Hochet story Le Fantome de l’alchimiste (The alchimist’s ghost) by André-Paul Duchâteau and Tibet is published.
- March 28: Corrier Boy (the former Corriere dei ragazzi) changes its headline in Corrier Boy serie music and furtherly reduces the comics’ space.
- IPC Magazines launches Tornado, a short-lived weekly British comic published for 22 issues.
- The Human Fly, with issue #19, is cancelled by Marvel.
- In Metal hurlant, Exterminator 17, by Jean-Pierre Dionnet and Enki Bilal is first published.

=== April ===
- April 9: The first episode of Vahan Shirvanian's No Comment is published.
- April 15: The final episode of The Captain and the Kids is published. Originally drawn by Rudolph Dirks, it was continued by his son John Dirks since 1962.
- Kid Colt Outlaw (1949 series), with issue #225, canceled by Marvel.
- The reprint title Marvel Triple Action, with issue #47, is cancelled by Marvel.
- La nuit des rapaces (The raptors’ night), first Jeremiah’s album by Herman Huppen (published by Fleurus).
- First issue of the magazine Maxmagnus (Corno).

=== May ===
- May 5: David Sutherland introduces Dennis' pet pig Rasher in Dennis the Menace and Gnasher.
- May 15: In Tintin, the first chapter of the Jonathan story Douniacha, il y a longtemps... (Douniacha, long time ago) by Cosey is published.
- May 19: A statue of Suske en Wiske, designed by René Rosseel, is revealed at the Antwerp Zoo.
- Frank Miller takes over from Gene Colan as regular penciler on Daredevil with issue #158.
- Vince Colletta resigns as art director of DC Comics.
- Rawhide Kid, with issue #135, canceled by Marvel.
- Captain Marvel, with issue #62, cancelled by Marvel.
- Howard the Duck (vol. 1), with issue #31, canceled by Marvel.
- Black Panther, with issue #15, cancelled by Marvel.
- In Il Mago, Piombo di mancia (Tip lead) by Vittorio Giardino; debut of the Bolognese private eye Sam Pezzo.

=== June ===
- June 6: In Tintin, the first chapter of the Thorgal story Les Trois Vieillards du pays d'Aran (The three old men from Aran country), by Jean Van Hamme and Grzegorz Rosiński is published.
- June 17: The final episode of the weekly political-satirical gag comic spin-off of Jean Tabary's Iznogoud is printed in the Sunday newspaper Journal du Dimanche.
- June 21: In Spirou, the first chapter of the Spirou & Fantasio story Des haricots partout by Jean Claude Fournier is published.
- First issue of Il Paperino d’oro (The golden Donald Duck), published by Mondadori; reprints of the classic stories by Carl Barks.
- In Alterlinus, La lunga notte (The long night), by Sergio Toppi, first episode of the series Sharaz-de, inspired by One Thousand and One Nights.
- In Super Goofy, The Day a Knight Was Born, by Del Connel and Pete Alvarado; debut of the Mighty Knight, Middle-age version of Super Goofy.
- Cico story, by Guido Nolitta and Gallieno Ferri; first album fully dedicated to the Zagor’s Mexican partner.
- In Italy, first issue of Storie blu (Blue stories, Ediperiodici), anthological magazine of sci-fi and erotic comics.

=== Summer ===
- DC Special Series #17 — DC Special Series returns after it had gone on hiatus in Fall 1978.

=== July ===
- World of Krypton – #1 of 3, by DC Comics. The first official limited series, this three-issue "mini-series" was originally slated for Showcase #104-106 to coincide with the premiere of Superman: The Movie. The storyline was rescheduled for Showcase #110-112 when the film's release date was delayed; but ultimately, Showcase was cancelled after issue #104. Finally, the material is revised and released as a limited series by Paul Kupperberg and Howard Chaykin.
- With issue #24, Marvel cancels Godzilla, King of the Monsters.
- La resa dei conti (The showndown), by Magnus, last episode of La compagnia della forca.
- In Marvel Two-in-one 53, the story arc Project Pegasus begins.
- July 25: Marvel UK publishes the final weekly issue (#352) of Marvel Comic.
- July 26: In the German magazine Zack, the parody Western series Silas Finn by the Italian authors Tiziano Sclavi and Giorgio Cavazzano is published.

=== August ===
- With issue #70, Marvel publishes the final issue of The Tomb of Dracula, ending writer Marv Wolfman and artist Gene Colan's uninterrupted six-year run on the title.
- In the story Mister No va alla guerra (Mr. No goes to war), by Guido Nolitta and Gallieno Ferri, the true name of the character (Jerry Drake) is revealed.
- In Pif Gadget, debut of two adventure series: Ayak, by Jean Ollivier and Eduardo Teixeira Coelho, set in the Klondike Gold rush, with an arctic wolf as protagonist, and Marine fille de pirate (The pirate’s daughter) by Francois Corteggiani and Pierre Tranchand.
- August 19: in Topolino, Topolino e l’enigma di Mu, by Massimo De Vita; debut of Prof. Zachary Zapotec.
- August 25: IPC Magazines merged two comic books 2000 AD and Starlord and Tornado into "2000 AD and Tornado".

=== September ===
- September: The Indian comics magazine Target is launched. Inside the first issue, Ajit Ninan's detective comic Detective Moochhwala makes its debut.
- September 9: For Better or For Worse, by Lynn Johnston, debuts, distributed by Universal Press Syndicate.
- September 17: Jaap Vegter receives the Stripschapprijs.
- All-Out War #1: a new war title in the Dollar Comics format is launched by DC Comics with a September/October cover date.
- The Best of DC #1: a reprint anthology title in the digest format is launched by DC Comics with a September/October cover date.
- "The Proteus Saga", by Chris Claremont and John Byrne, begins in Uncanny X-Men #125 (running through issue #128).
- Marvel Comic, with issue #353, becomes a monthly title and is renamed Marvel Superheroes. (Marvel UK)
- The Invaders, with issue #41, is cancelled by Marvel.
- The first edition of the Helsinki Comics Festival is organized in Helsinki, Finland.
- Calibro 45, by Ennio and Vladimiro Missaglia (Daim Press); first album of the short-lived western series Judas,
- In the fall issue of Co-Evolution Quarterly, Robert Crumb's one-shot comic A Short History of America is printed.

=== October ===
- October 1: Hergé's Tintin and Snowy receive a statue in Uccle.
- January 6: The final episode of Kees Stip and Nico Visscher's newspaper gag-a-day comic In de Wolken is published.
- October 6: In The Louisville Times, the first episode of Don Rosa’s Captain Kentucky is published.
- October 21: In Il Giornalino, the first chapter of Gargantua e Pantagruel, Dino Battaglia’s comics adaptation of Gargantua and Pantagruel, is published.
- Action Comics #500: 68-pages, "The Life Story of Superman," by Martin Pasko, Curt Swan, and Frank Chiaramonte.
- Star*Reach, with issue #18, publishes its final issue.
- Time Warp #1: a new science-fiction anthology in the Dollar Comics format is launched by DC Comics with an October/November cover date.
- With issue #28, Marvel cancels John Carter, Warlord of Mars.
- In the Argentine magazine El pendulo the first episode of the series Las puertitas del senor Lopez, by Carlos Trillo and Horacio Altuna is published.

=== December ===
- December 21: In VSD, the first chapter of Le magot des Dalton (The Daltons’ swag) by Morris and Vicq is published. Vicq succeeds the late Goscinny as Lucky Luke’s writer.
- The final issue of the Dutch adult comics magazine Gummi/De Ballooen is published.
- In Linus, the first strip of Sergio Staino’s Bobo appears.

=== Specific date unknown ===
- Due to weak sales numbers from 1978, during the course of the year Marvel Comics cancels a number of ongoing titles: Black Panther; Captain Marvel; Godzilla, King of the Monsters; Howard the Duck; The Human Fly; The Invaders; John Carter, Warlord of Mars; Kid Colt Outlaw; Marvel Triple Action; and Rawhide Kid.
- The "Demon in a Bottle" storyline, by David Michelinie, Bob Layton, and John Romita, Jr., runs through Iron Man (issues #120–128, March–November).
- Alien: The Illustrated Story, a comics adaptation of Alien, by Archie Goodwin and Walt Simonson, published by Heavy Metal.
- In Turnhout, Belgium the first edition of the Stripgids Festival is organized by Jan Smet.
- Belgian comic artist Morris is knighted in the Order of Leopold II.
- Comic artist Gary Panter publishes the Rozz Tox Manifesto, in which he encourages counterculture artists to infiltrate the mainstream media.

== Births ==
=== March ===
- March 27: Mia Ikumi, Japanese manga artist (Tokyo Mew Mew, Super Doll Licca-chan), (d. 2022).

=== November ===
- November 22: Jeremy Dale, American comics artist (G.I. Joe: A Real American Hero), (d. 2014).

== Deaths ==
=== January ===
- January 8: Victor Hubinon, Belgian comics writer (Buck Danny, Redbeard), dies from a heart attack at age 59.

=== February ===
- February 9: Daniël Jansens, Belgian comics writer (Bessy, Lombok, Bakelandt, Kramikske), dies from a heart attack at age 47.
- February 15: Roy d'Ami, Italian comics writer, artist and founder of the Studio Creazioni d'Ami, dies at age 55.
- February 22: John Coleman Burroughs, American illustrator and comics artist (John Carter of Mars, David Innes of Pellucidar), dies at age 65.

=== March ===
- March 24: Ole Lund Kirkegaard, Danish novelist and illustrator (Gummi Tarzan), freezes to death at age 38.

=== April ===
- April 29: Hardie Gramatky, American novelist, comics artist and animator (inked Mickey Mouse, ghosted Captain Kidd Jr. and Ella Cinders), dies at age 72.

=== May ===
- May 10: Louis Paul Boon, Belgian novelist, poet and comic writer (scripted Proleetje & Fantast, drawn by Maurice Roggeman), dies at age 67.

=== June ===
- June 25: Dave Fleischer, American animator, film producer and director (Koko the Clown, Betty Boop, Popeye), dies of a stroke at age 84.

=== July ===
- July 4: Pagsilang Rey Isip, Filipino-American comics artist, painter, photographer and musician, dies at age 68 from a heart attack.
- July 19: Paul Bransom, American comics artist, illustrator and painter (The Latest News from Bugville), dies at age 94.

=== August ===
- August 10: Emmerich Huber, German comics artist (Das Neueste von Onkel Jup, Hans und Lottchen, Meine Lustige Fibel, Die Himmelswerkstatt, Bei Tüddelwitt im Zwergenwald, Bilderbogen von Emmerich Huber, Familie Kindermann), illustrator and advertising artist, dies at age 75.
- August 15: Walter Berndt, American comics artist (Smitty), dies at age 80.
- August 26: Mika Waltari, Finnish novelist and comics writer (wrote for Asmo Alho), dies at age 70.

=== September ===
- September 12: Les Clark, American animator (Disney Studios), dies at age 71.
- September 20: Erich Gold, AKA Goltz, AKA Eric Peters, Austrian-American caricaturist, political cartoonist, comic writer and artist (Abbott & Costello comics, Elsie the Cow comics), dies at age 80.
- September 26: Carl Grubert, American comics artist (The Berrys), dies at age 68.

=== October ===
- October 16: René Brantonne, French illustrator and comics artist, dies at age 76.
- October 30: Oscar Conti, aka Oski, Argentine cartoonist, caricaturist, animator and comics artist (Cascabel, The True History of the Indies), dies at age 65.

=== November ===
- November 2: Walter Bell, British comics artist (continued Weary Willy and Tired Tim and Casey's Court, made celebrity comics for Film Fun), dies at age 86.
- November 5: Al Capp, American comics artist (Li'l Abner, Abbie an' Slats, Long Sam), dies at age 70.
- November 22: Hugh McNeill, British comics artist (Ping the Elastic Man, Pansy Potter, Winnie the Witch, Jack and Jill), dies at age 68.
- November 23: Eugène Gire, French comics artist (Cap'tain Vir de Bor), dies at age 73.
- November 30: Dick Huemer, American animator (Disney Studios) and comics writer (The Adventures of Buck O'Rue, True Life Adventures), dies at age 81.

=== December ===
- December 20: Leslie Illingworth, British cartoonist and comics artist, dies at age 77.

=== Specific date unknown ===
- Garrett Price, American comics artist, cartoonist and illustrator (White Boy, later renamed Skull Valley), dies at age 81 or 82.
- Carlos Laffond, Spanish comics artist (Thierry Le Chevalier, illustrated L'Oncle Paul), dies at age 49 or 50.

== Conventions ==
- April 6–8: MiamiCon II (Holiday Inn, Miami, Florida) — first iteration of the show since 1975; guests include Stan Lee
- June: Comicon (Australia) (RMIT, Melbourne, Australia) — first Australian comic book convention
- June: Houstoncon (Houston, Texas) — guests include George Pérez and Walter Koenig
- June: World of Comics — guests include Jim Steranko
- June 7–10: D-Con '79 (Dallas, Texas) — Larry Lankford's revival of D-Con after a hiatus; antecedent to Lankford's later Dallas Fantasy Fair
- June 30–July 1: Comic Art Convention I (Statler Hilton Hotel, New York City)
- July 14–15: Comic Art Convention II (Philadelphia, Pennsylvania)
- July 20–22: Chicago Comicon (Pick-Congress Hotel, Chicago, Illinois) — special guests: Mike W. Barr and John Byrne; first year that Joe Sarno is not one of the show's organizers, leaving the duties to Larry Charet and Bob Weinberg
- August: Atlanta Fantasy Fair (Downtown Atlanta Sheraton, Atlanta, Georgia) — official guests include John Byrne, Dave Sim
- August: FantaCon '80 (The Egg convention center, Empire State Plaza, Albany, New York) — first annual Albany-area horror and comic book convention, hosted by FantaCo Enterprises publisher Thomas Skulan
- August 1–5: San Diego Comic-Con (Convention and Performing Arts Center and U.S. Grant Hotel, San Diego, California) — 6,000 attendees; official guests: Kelly Freas, Mike Jittlov, Harvey Kurtzman, Victor Moscoso, Nestor Redondo, Marshall Rogers, John Romita Sr., Mort Walker, Len Wein, and Marv Wolfman
- August 11–12: Comicon '79 (London) British Comic Art Convention 11 (Rembrandt Hotel, Thurloe Place, London) — sponsored by Valhalla Books of Ilford, and organized by Ian Starling, Neville Ferris, and Ian Knox; guests include Jim Starlin (guest of honor), Paul Neary, Dez Skinn
- August 31–September 2: Comicon '79 (Birmingham) U.K. Comic Art & Fantasy Convention (Hotel Metropole, National Exhibition Centre; Birmingham, England) — produced by Colin Campbell/Biytoo Books; guests include Jim Steranko (guest of honor), Marshall Rogers, Terry Austin, Paul Levitz, Howard Chaykin, Len Wein, Joe Staton, Dez Skinn, and Dave Gibbons; presentation of the Eagle Awards
- September: OrlandoCon (Orlando, Florida) — guests include Will Eisner, C. C. Beck, Bob Cummings, Kirby Grant, and Jack Rosen
- November 24–26: Creation '79 (Statler Hilton Hotel, New York City) — guests include Tom Savini; admission: $6/day
- December 15: "Christmas Con" (Philadelphia, Pennsylvania) — guests include Rick Marschall

== Awards ==
=== Eagle Awards ===
Presented in 1980 for comics published in 1979:

- Roll of Honor: Jack Kirby
- Favourite Writer: Chris Claremont
- Favourite Comicbook Artist: John Byrne
- Favourite Inker: Terry Austin
- Favourite Comic Book (Drama): Uncanny X-Men
- Favourite Comic Book (Humor): Howard the Duck, by Steve Gerber and Gene Colan
- Favourite New Comic Title: Howard the Duck
- Favorite Single Comic Book Story: "Demon in a Bottle," Iron Man #s 120–128, by David Michelinie, John Romita, Jr., and Bob Layton
- Favourite Continued Comic Story: X-Men #125-128, by Chris Claremont and John Byrne
- Best Comicbook Cover: The Avengers #185, by George Pérez
- Favourite Team: X-Men
- Favourite Character: Wolverine
- Favourite Supporting Character: Wolverine
- Favourite Villain: Magneto
- Character Most Worthy of Own Title: Warlock
- Favourite Title (UK): Starburst, edited by Dez Skinn

== First issues by title ==
=== DC Comics ===
The Best of DC — Digest size title

Release: September /October

All-Out War — Dollar Comics title

Release: September /October Editor: Murray Boltinoff

Time Warp — Dollar Comics title

Release: October /November Editor: Jack C. Harris

=== Marvel Comics ===
Amazing Adventures vol. 3

Release: December. Reprinting the original X-Men title.

Doctor Who Magazine

Release: October 11 by Marvel UK.

Hulk Comic

Release: March 7 by Marvel UK. Editor: Dez Skinn.

Man-Thing vol. 2

Release: November. Writer: Michael Fleisher. Artists: Jim Mooney and Bob Wiacek.

Marvel Spotlight vol. 2

Release: July. Editor: Roger Stern.

Micronauts

Release: January. Writer: Bill Mantlo. Artist: Michael Golden.

Rom: Spaceknight

Release: December. Writer: Bill Mantlo. Artist: Sal Buscema.

Shogun Warriors

Release: February. Writer: Doug Moench. Artist: Herb Trimpe.

Tales to Astonish vol. 2

Release: December. Reprinting edited versions of the 1968 Sub-Mariner title.

=== Independent titles ===
Battle of the Planets
Release: June by Gold Key Comics. Writer: Gary Poole. Artist: Win Mortimer.

Best Buy Comics
Release February by Apex Novelties. Writers and Artists: Robert Crumb and Aline Kominsky

Starblazer
Release: April by D. C. Thomson & Co. Ltd.

== Initial appearances by character name ==
=== DC Comics ===
- Blok, in Superboy and the Legion of Super-Heroes #253
- Carl Draper, in Superman #331
- Green Fury, in Super Friends #25
- Firebug, in Batman #318
- Lucius Fox, in Batman #307
- Timothy Fox, in Batman #313
- Maxie Zeus, in Detective Comics #483

=== Marvel Comics ===
- El Águila, in Power Man and Iron Fist #58
- Alpha Flight, in Uncanny X-Men #120
  - Aurora
  - Northstar
  - Sasquatch
  - Shaman
  - Snowbird
- Black Cat, in The Amazing Spider-Man #194
- Dire Wraith, in Rom #1
- Followers of the Light, in Shogun Warriors #1
- Justin Hammer, in Iron Man #120
- H.E.R.B.I.E., in Fantastic Four #209
- Kroton (Cyberman), in Doctor Who Weekly #5 (Marvel UK)
- Cassie Lang, in Marvel Premiere #47
- Scott Lang, in The Avengers #181; as Ant-Man in Marvel Premiere #47
- Lady Lotus, in Invaders #37
- Night Raven, in Hulk Comic #1 (Marvel UK)
- Quasar, in The Incredible Hulk #234
- Proteus, in Uncanny X-Men #125
- Rom, in Rom: Spaceknight #1
- Schizoid Man, in Spectacular Spider-Man #36
- Shadow King, in Uncanny X-Men #117 (January)
- Screaming Mimi, in Marvel Two-in-One #54
- Vampiro, in The Mighty Thor #290 (December)
- War Machine, in Iron Man #118
- Debra Whitman, in The Amazing Spider-Man #196
- Mariko Yashida, in Uncanny X-Men #118
