= Angese =

Italian cartoonist (1947–2008)

- Born: Sergio Angeletti; 4 February 1947; Rome, Italy
- Died: 11 February 2008 (aged 61); Perugia, Italy

Sergio Angeletti (4 February 1947 – 11 February 2008), professionally known as Angese, was an Italian editorial cartoonist, satirist, and caricaturist.

== Life and career ==
Born in Rome, Angese graduated in accounting and starting from 1973 he collaborated with various publications including the newspapers Momento Sera and La Voce Repubblicana and the magazines Rinascita and Aut.

In 1975, he became editorial cartoonist of the newspaper Paese Sera, replacing Giorgio Forattini. He was a regular collaborator of the satirical magazine Il Male, and his collaborations also included Tango, Cuore, L'Espresso, linus and Il Foglio. He also served as editor of the short-lived newspaper L'Eco della Carogna.

Angese died of colon cancer on 11 February 2008, at the age of 61 years old.
