= 1978 in comics =

Notable events of 1978 in comics.

== Events ==
=== January ===
- Green Lantern #100: Double-size special featuring Green Lantern, Green Arrow, Black Canary, and Air Wave. (DC Comics).
- The first episode of L’uomo di Tsushima (The man of Tsushima) by Bonvi is published, a retelling of the famous battle as seen by Jack London, for the series Un uomo un’avventura (Bonelli).

=== February ===
- February 2: Belgian comics artist Maurice Tillieux is killed in a car crash.
- The first issue of the Belgian comics magazine À Suivre is published. It will run until December 1997.
  - In the first issue of A Suivre the first chapter of Jean-Claude Forest and Jacques Tardi's Ici Même (Just Here) makes its debut.
- Detective Comics #475, "The Laughing Fish" by Steve Englehart, Marshall Rogers, and Terry Austin. (DC Comics)
- February 8: Marvel UK publish Star Wars Weekly in a black-and-white anthology format.
- February 28:The first appearance of ElfQuest by Wendy and Richard Pini in issue #1 (and only) of Fantasy Quarterly.

=== March ===
- March 2: In Spirou, the first chapter of the Yoko Tsuno episode La fille du vent, by Roger Leloup, is published.
- March 21: In Pilote, the first chapter of the Valérian story Heroes of the Equinox by Pierre Christin and Jean-Claude Mézières is published.
- In the second issue of À Suivre Benoît Sokal's Inspector Canardo makes its debut.
- Dennis O'Neil and Neal Adams' comic book Superman vs. Muhammad Ali is published in which Superman meets boxing champion Muhammad Ali.

=== April ===
- April 13: The first episode of Bernard Hislaire's Bidouille et Violette debuts in Spirou.
- April 18: In the Le journal de Tintin, the first chapter of the second Thorgal story The island of frozen seas by Jean Van Hamme and Grzegorz Rosiński is published.
- April 20: In Spirou, the first chapter of Kodo le tyran, by Jean-Claude Fournier is published.
- Claw the Unconquered, with issue #10 (April /May), is revived by DC after an 18-month hiatus.
- Power Man, with issue #50, changes its name to Power Man and Iron Fist.

=== May ===
- May 14-21: In Topolino, The planetary wars, by Guido Martina and Giovan Battista Carpi, a spoof of Star Wars, is published.
- May 19: Scripps Company merges its two syndication arms, Newspaper Enterprise Association and United Feature Syndicate (established by Scripps in 1919), to form United Media Enterprises.
- Showcase #100: "Awesome Anniversary Edition! 60 Sensational Super-Stars" — featuring almost every character who ever appeared in Showcase — by Paul Kupperberg, Paul Levitz, and Joe Staton.
- IPC Magazines publishes the first issue of the short-lived comics magazine Starlord

=== June ===
- Continuing the "DC Explosion", the company increases its titles' page counts to 25 story pages and increases the price of a typical comic from 35 cents to 50 cents.
- Batman #300: "The Last Batman Story—?", by David V. Reed, Walt Simonson, and Dick Giordano.
- Garfield, by Jim Davis is launched on June 19 in 41 newspapers.
- In the magazine Cannibale RanXerox by Tanino Liberatore makes its debut.

=== Summer ===
- DC Special Series #15 — "I Now Pronounce You Batman and Wife!", marriage of Batman and Talia al Ghul, by Dennis O'Neil, Michael Golden, and Dick Giordano. See also Batman: Son of the Demon

=== July ===
- July 4 : In Tintin magazine, the first chapter of the Jonathan story L'Espace bleu entre les nuages (The blue space amongst the clouds) by Cosey, the fifth episode of the series, is published.

=== August ===
- The DC Implosion takes hold, as the company cancels 4 ongoing titles, Aquaman, Claw the Unconquered, Mister Miracle, and Shade, the Changing Man.
- Fledgling publisher Eclipse Comics releases Sabre: Slow Fade of an Endangered Species, by Don McGregor and Paul Gulacy, considered one of the industry's first "graphic novels".
- With issue #10 The Rampaging Hulk changes its title to The Hulk!, and goes from black-and-white to color (Curtis Magazines).

=== Fall ===
- DC Special Series #16 — "The Last Bounty Hunter!", death of Jonah Hex, by Michael Fleisher and Russ Heath. DC Special Series goes on hiatus after this issue and is revived in Summer 1979.

=== September ===
- September 7: The first episode of Frank Pé's Broussaille is published in Spirou.
- September 30: Martin Lodewijk receives the Stripschapprijs.
- Matt Groening's gag comic Life in Hell, launched in 1977, appears in print for the first time in the art magazine Wet.
- Suffering from the DC Implosion, the company cancels 8 ongoing titles, All Star Comics, Battle Classics, Black Lightning, Doorway to Nightmare, Dynamic Classics, Kamandi: The Last Boy on Earth, Showcase, and Our Fighting Forces. In addition, DC cuts back comic story pages to 17, and the typical cover price to 40 cents.
- Gold Key Comics, with issue #19, picks up Flash Gordon (1966 series) from Charlton Comics, which had stopped publishing the title in 1970.
- After many delays, DC releases All-New Collectors' Edition #C-56, featuring the story Superman vs. Muhammad Ali.
- In Pilote, the first chapter of The black order brigade by Pierre Christin and Enki Bilal is published.

=== October ===
- The DC Implosion forces the company to cancel 6 more ongoing titles: Firestorm, House of Secrets, Secrets of Haunted House, Star Hunters, Steel: The Indestructible Man, and The Witching Hour.
- Will Eisner's graphic novel A Contract with God is published by Baronet Books. An early landmark of the graphic novel form.
- Will Eisner's "Signal From Space" storyline begins in Spirit Magazine #19 (continuing through issue #26, October 1980).
- In À Suivre, Milo Manara's HP and Giuseppe Bergman, is first published.
- October 14: IPC Magazines merged two comic books: 2000 AD and Starlord into "2000 AD and Starlord".
- October 15: The Dutch comics organisation Het Stripschap holds a dinner to celebrate their 10th anniversary. During the event one of their guests, Dick Matena, starts making a scene while drunk. The incident will become legendary afterwards.
- Diane Noomin releases the collective comic book Lemme Outa Here! Growing Up Inside the American Dream, published by Print Mint.

=== November ===
- November 22: In Belgium the Vlaamse Onafhankelijke Stripgilde (Flemish Independent Comics Guild) is founded, with cartoonist Eddy Ryssack as their first president.
- Fantastic Four #200: Double-sized anniversary issue, "When Titans Clash!" by Marv Wolfman, Keith Pollard, and Joe Sinnott. (Marvel Comics)
- L’uomo delle nevi (The snowman), by Alfredo Castelli and Milo Manara, for the series Un uomo un’avventura (Bonelli).
- In Il Mago Soviet secret agent Ivan Timbrovic by Massimo Cavezzali makes his debut.
- First volume of the Storia d’Italia a fumetti di Enzo Biagi (Enzo Biagi’s History of Italy in comics), drawn by some of the best Italian cartoonists (Milo Manara, Sergio Toppi, Dino Battaglia).

=== December ===
- Kamillo Kromo, book for children by Francesco Tullio Altan.
- Art Spiegelman creates Ed Head, published in Playboy on an irregular basis until November 1981.

=== Specific date unknown ===
- Edwina Dumm becomes the first female comic artist to receive the Gold Key Award from the National Cartoonists Society.
- DC suffers the DC Implosion, the abrupt cancellation of more than two dozen ongoing and planned titles including All Star Comics, Aquaman, House of Secrets, Our Fighting Forces, Showcase, and The Witching Hour. The vast majority of the books leave uncompleted story lines, most of which are later wrapped up in other titles.
- Archie Goodwin resigns as Marvel Comics editor-in-chief, replaced by Jim Shooter (who will hold the post until mid-1987).
- Underground publisher the Print Mint stops publishing comics.
- "The Korvac Saga" story arc, written by Jim Shooter and David Michelinie, with art by George Pérez and David Wenzel, runs through The Avengers, beginning in issue #167 (February) and running through issue #177 (November)
- "The Cursed Earth" Judge Dredd storyline runs in 2000 AD (May – October)
- Belgian comic artist Hergé is knighted as Officer in the Order of Leopold II.
- Roger Brunel starts drawing porn parodies of famous comics, serialized in the magazine Circus and released in album format by Glénat under the title Pastiches.
- The final episode of Crawford is published, a newspaper comic launched by animation director Chuck Jones.
- In the Argentina magazine D’artagnan, debut of Savarese by Robin Wood and Domingo Mandrafina; the protagonist of the series is an Italian-American cop and then FBI agent, fighting crime in the roaring Twenties.

== Births ==
=== June ===
- June 24: Carlo Pagulayan, Filipino comic book artist (Deathstroke, The Incredible Hulk, Elektra).

=== July ===
- July 15: Tom King, American comic book writer (Batman, Omega Men, Mister Miracle, The Vision).

== Deaths ==
=== January ===
- January 9: Tijs Dorenbosch, Dutch comics artist (Sjefke Schrober, Henkie van 't Grijze Nest, Pieternel, Heintje Hups en Honkie), dies at age 66.
- January 18: Clark Haas, American comics artist, animator and animation producer (Sunnyside, assisted on Buz Sawyer and Tim Tyler's Luck), dies at age 58.

=== February ===
- February 1: Roland Kohlsaat, German illustrator and comics artist (Jimmy das Gummipferd, Julios Abenteuerliche Reisen), dies at age 64.
- February 2: Maurice Tillieux, Belgian comics artist (Félix, Gil Jourdan), dies in a car accident at age 56.
- February 5: Frans Van Immerseel, Belgian painter, caricaturist, cartoonist, illustrator and comics artist (De Lotgevallen van Janssens), dies at age 68.
- February 7: Enrique Rapela, Argentine comics artist (Cirilo El Audaz), dies at age 67.
- February 9:
  - Woody Gelman, American animator, comics artist, novelist and publisher (The Dodo and the Frog, co-creator of Bazooka Joe), dies of a stroke at age 62.
  - Warren King, American comics artist (The Firefly), dies at age 62.
- February 19: Gisela Zimmermann, German comics artist (continued Digedags and Abrafaxe), dies at age 65 of heart failure.
- February 21: Pol Dom, Belgian-Dutch illustrator, sculptor, caricaturist and comic artist (made comics for the jam factory De Betuwe), dies at age 92.
- February 28: Glenn Chaffin, American comics writer (Tailspin Tommy), dies at age 80.

=== March ===
- March 3: Frank Fogarty, American comics artist (Mr. & Mrs., continued Clarence), dies at age 80.
- March 8: Tjeerd Bottema, Dutch illustrator and comics artist (Er Was Eens Een Oud Vrouwtje), dies at age 94.
- March 30: István Köpeczi Bócz, Hungarian poster designer, costume designer, illustrator and comics artist, dies at age 58.

=== April ===
- April 9: Elmer Woggon, American comics artist (Big Chief Wahoo (Steve Roper and Mike Nomad)), dies at age 79.
- April 14: André Beautemps, Belgian comics writer and artist (Michael Logan), dies at age 29.
- April 29: Louis Zansky, American comics artist (worked for Classics Illustrated), dies at age 57.

=== May ===
- May 7: Mort Weisinger, American comic book writer (DC Comics), dies at age 63.
- May 11: Clinge Doorenbos, Dutch comedian, singer, songwriter, children's novelist, poet, journalist and comics writer (Flippie Flink), dies at age 93.
- May 27: Jo Spier, Dutch illustrator and cartoonist, dies at age 77.

=== June ===
- June 22: William Reusswig, American illustrator and comics artist (made comic adaptations of novels), dies at age 75.

=== July ===
- July 23: Tom Hill, American comics artist (continued Mark Trail), dies at age 56.

=== August ===
- August 1: Geoffrey William Backhouse, British illustrator and comics artist, dies at age 74.
- August 5: Paul Cuvelier, Belgian comics artist and painter (Corentin, Epoxy), dies at age 54.

=== September ===
- September 9: Barbara Shermund, American cartoonist (Shermund's Sallies), dies at age 79.

=== October ===
- October 4: Sezgin Burak, Turkish comics artist (Tarkan), dies at age 43.
- October 10: John Randolph Bray, American animator and comics artist (Singing Sammy, Mr. O.U. Absentmind, Colonel Heeza Liar), dies at the age of 99.

=== November ===
- November 8: Norman Rockwell, American painter and illustrator (made a few sequential illustrations in his career), dies at the age of 84.
- November 20: Tom Okamoto, aka Tom Oka, aka Tom Mako, Japanese-American animator and comics artist (Deems, Little Brave, continued Li'l Neebo), dies at age 62.
- November 21: Orhan Ural, Turkish comics artist (Pazar Ola Hasan Bey), dies at age 64 or 65.

=== December ===
- December 4: Brian Lewis, British illustrator, comics artist and animator (The Suicide Six, continued Jet Ace Logan), dies at age 49.
- December 6: Dick Dreux, A.K.A. Rod Draga, Dutch novelist, radio writer and comics artist (Raket-Ridders), dies at age 65.
- December 28: Hi Mankin, American comics artist (the Roy Rogers newspaper comic, Hanna-Barbera comics, assisted on The Adventures of Smilin' Jack, Bringing Up Father, Buz Sawyer, Dotty Dripple), dies at age 51 or 52 from a heart attack.
- December 31: Arsène Brivot, French comics artist and illustrator (Jojo Richissime), dies at age 80.
- December 31: Basil Wolverton, American comics artist (Mad Magazine, Powerhouse Pepper), dies at age 69.
- Specific date unknown: Jacques Gagnier, Canadian caricaturist, comics artist, children's book illustrator and cartoonist (La Vie en Images), dies at age 61.

=== Specific date unknown ===
- Aldo De Amicis, Italian comics artist (worked for Il Vittorioso), dies at age 74 or 75.
- Al Fago, American comics artist (Atomic Mouse, Atomic Rabbit, Timmy the Timid Ghost), dies at age 73 or 74.
- Frank Fogarty, American comics artist (Mr. & Mrs., continued Clarence), dies at age 90 or 91.
- Henry Le Monnier, French illustrator and comics artist (made various realistic adventure comics), dies at age 84 or 85.
- Oscar Novelle, Argentinean-American comic artist (worked for Gold Key Comics, Eerie, Creepy), dies at age 57 or 58.

== Conventions ==
- Lancaster Comic Art Convention (Lancaster, Pennsylvania) — produced by Chuck Miller and Charlie Roberts
- Summer: Atlanta Fantasy Fair (Dunfey's Royal Coach, Atlanta, Georgia) — official guests included Stan Lee, Jim Starlin, Howard Chaykin, Jim Steranko
- June 23–25: Houstoncon (Houston, Texas) — guests include Frankie Thomas, Kirk Alyn, Ron Goulart, Gil Kane, Jenette Kahn, Frank Brunner, Ray Harryhausen, Greg Jein, Kerry Gammill, Jim Newsome, and Paula Crist
- July 2–5: Comic Art Convention I (Americana Hotel, New York City)
- July 8–9: Comic Art Convention II (Philadelphia, Pennsylvania)
- July 14–16: Chicago Comicon (Pick-Congress Hotel, 520 South Michigan Avenue, Chicago, Illinois) — 3rd annual convention under that name
- July 26–30: San Diego Comic-Con (El Cortez Hotel, San Diego, California) — show reaches attendance mark of 5,000 for the first time. Official guests: John Buscema, Howard Chaykin, Shary Flenniken, Alan Dean Foster, Gardner Fox, Steve Gerber, Burne Hogarth, Greg Jein, Bob Kane, Gray Morrow, Clarence "Ducky" Nash, Grim Natwick, Wendy Pini, Frank Thorne, Boris Vallejo
- July 29–30: Comicon '78 (British Comic Art Convention) (Bloomsbury Centre Hotel, London, England) — "10th anniversary special;" guests include Don McGregor (guest of honor), George Pérez, Jim Salicrup, Duffy Vohland, Brian Bolland, John Bolton, Brian Lewis, Trevor Goring, Dez Skinn, and Dave Gibbons; 2nd annual presentation of the Eagle Awards
- September: OrlandoCon (Orlando, Florida) — guests include Will Eisner, Bob Clampett, Les Turner, Ralph Dunagin, C. C. Beck, Edmond Good, Bill Black, Morris Weiss, Ralph Kent, Bill Crooks, and Zack Mosley
- September 2–3: Albany Comic Con (Turf Inn, Colonie, New York) — tentative guest list included Joe Sinnott, Joe Staton, and Al Milgrom
- September 2–3: Comicon II (British Comic Art Convention II) (Imperial Hotel, Birmingham, UK) — Guest of honor: Dave Cockrum (did not show), other guests: Paul Neary, Hunt Emerson, Chris Welch
- October 29–November 5: Salone Internazionale dei Comics (Lucca, Italy) — 13th edition of the festival (having skipped 1977)
- November 13–15: OAF SF & Nostalgia Show 1978 (Tradewinds Hotel, Oklahoma City, Oklahoma) — science fiction/nostalgia convention staged by the Oklahoma Alliance of Fans, producers of Multicon
- November 17–19: Delaware Valley Comicart Consortium Third Annual Convention Honoring Women in Comics (Philadelphia, Pennsylvania) — guests included Paty, Mary Jo Duffy, Wendy Pini, Frank Thorne, Boris Vallejo, and Bill Ward
- November 24–26: Creation '78 (Statler Hilton, New York City) — guests include John Byrne, Howard Chaykin, Jim Steranko, Herb Trimpe, Gray Morrow, Bob Larkin, John Romita, Sr., John Romita, Jr., Gene Colan, Rudy Nebres, and Tom Yeates
- December 1–3: Wintercon '78 (Tradewinds Hotel, Oklahoma City, Oklahoma)
- December 29: Albany Comic Con II (Albany, New York)

== Awards ==
=== Eagle Awards ===
Presented in 1979 for comics published in 1978:

- Roll of Honour: Steve Englehart

==== American section ====
- Favourite Writer: Chris Claremont
- Favourite Artist: John Byrne
- Favourite Inker: Terry Austin
- Favourite Comic Book (Drama): Uncanny X-Men (Marvel Comics)
- Favourite New Comics Title: Micronauts
- Favourite Single Story: "Mindgames", Uncanny X-Men #111, by Chris Claremont and John Byrne
- Best Continuing Story: "The Korvac Saga" in The Avengers #167, 168, 170–177, written by Jim Shooter and David Michelinie, with art by George Pérez and David Wenzel
- Favourite Cover: Master of Kung Fu #67, by Paul Gulacy
- Favourite Team: X-Men
- Favorite Supporting Character: Wolverine
- Favourite Villain: Magneto
- Character Most Worthy of His Own Title: Silver Surfer
- Favourite Specialist Comics Publication: Comic Media News

==== U.K. section ====
- Favourite Writer: T.B. Grover
- Favourite Artist: John Bolton
- Favourite Comic: 2000 AD (Fleetway)
- Favourite Character: Judge Dredd

== First issues by title ==
=== DC Comics ===
Army at War

Release: November. Editor: Paul Levitz. (Immediately cancelled as a victim of the DC Implosion.)

Battle Classics

Release: September/October. Writer: Robert Kanigher. Artist: Joe Kubert. (Immediately cancelled as a victim of the DC Implosion.)

DC Comics Presents

Release: July. Writer: Martin Pasko. Artists: José Luis García-López and Dan Adkins.

Doorway to Nightmare

Release: January/February. Writer: David Michelinie. Artist: Val Mayerik.

Dynamic Classics

Release: September/October. Editor: Cary Burkett. (Reprint title immediately cancelled as a victim of the DC Implosion.)

Firestorm

Release: March. Writer: Gerry Conway. Artist: Al Milgrom.

Steel: The Indestructible Man

Release: March. Writer: Gerry Conway. Artists: Don Heck and Joe Giella.

=== Marvel Comics ===
Devil Dinosaur

Release: April. Writer/Artist: Jack Kirby.

Machine Man

Release: April. Writer/Artist: Jack Kirby.

Man From Atlantis

Release: February. Writer: Bill Mantlo. Artists: Tom Sutton and Sonny Trinidad.

Spider-Woman

Release: April. Writer: Marv Wolfman. Artists: Carmine Infantino and Tony DeZuniga.

=== Other publishers ===
1984

Release: June by Warren Publishing. Editor: Bill DuBay.

Anarchy Comics

Release: by Last Gasp. Editor: Jay Kinney.

À Suivre magazine

Release: February by Casterman.

Elfquest

Release: August by WaRP Graphics. Writers: Wendy Pini and Richard Pini. Artist: Wendy Pini.

Il Male

Release: February 7, Director : Vincino.

Misty

Release: February 4 by Fleetway.

Starlord

Release: May 13 by IPC Media.

== Canceled titles ==
=== DC Comics ===
- All Star Comics, with issue #74 (September/October)
- Aquaman, with issue #63 (August/September)
- Army at War, with issue #1 (November )
- Batman Family, with issue #20 (November ) — folded into the newly reformatted DC Dollar Comic Detective Comics
- Battle Classics, with issue #1 (September/October)
- Black Lightning, with issue #11 (September/October)
- Challengers of the Unknown, with issue #87 (June/July)
- Claw the Unconquered, with issue #12 (August/September)
- DC Super Stars, with issue #18 (January /February )
- Doorway to Nightmare, with issue #5 (September/October) — folded into the DC Dollar Comic The Unexpected
- Dynamic Classics, with issue #1 (September/October)
- Firestorm, with issue #5 (October/November)
- Freedom Fighters, with issue #15 (July/August)
- House of Secrets, with issue #154 (October/November)
- Kamandi: The Last Boy on Earth, with issue #59 (September/October)
- Karate Kid, with issue #15 (July/August)
- Metal Men, with issue #56 (February /March )
- Mister Miracle, with issue #25 (August )
- Our Fighting Forces, with issue #181 (September/October)
- Return of The New Gods, with issue #19 (July/August) — the numbering had continued from the New Gods 1971 series, which itself had been cancelled in 1972.
- Secret Society of Super Villains, with issue #15 (June/July)
- Secrets of Haunted House, with issue #14 (October/November) — revived a year later, however, with issue #15; the title continues until issue #46 in March 1982.
- Shade, the Changing Man, with issue #9 (August/September)
- Shazam!, with issue #35 (May/June) — folded into the DC Dollar Comic World's Finest
- Showcase, with issue #104 (September ) — the numbering had continued from the first volume of Showcase, which itself had been cancelled in 1970.
- Star Hunters, with issue #7 (October/November)
- Steel: The Indestructible Man, with issue #5 (October/November)
- Super-Team Family, with issue #15 (March/April) — the basic concept is reborn a few months later with the July debut of DC Comics Presents
- Teen Titans, with issue #53 (February )
- Welcome Back, Kotter, with issue #10 (March/April)
- The Witching Hour, with issue #85 (October ) — folded into the DC Dollar Comic The Unexpected

=== Marvel Comics ===
- The Champions, with issue #17 (January)
- Devil Dinosaur, with issue #9 (December)
- The Eternals, with issue #19 (January)
- Kull the Destroyer, with issue #29 (October)
- Marvel Classics Comics, with issue #36 (December)

=== Other publishers ===
- Bullet, with issue #147 (D. C. Thomson & Co. Ltd, December ) — merged with Warlord
- Ghostly Haunts, with issue #58 (April, Charlton)
- Krazy, with issue #79 (IPC, April 15) — merged with Whizzer and Chips
- The Many Ghosts of Doctor Graves, with issue #65 (Charlton, May) — the title picks up again with issue #66 in May 1981
- Starlord, with issue #22 (IPC Media, October 7)

== Initial appearances by character name ==
=== DC Comics ===
- Air Wave in Green Lantern #48 (January)
- Cinnamon in Weird Western Tales #48 (September)
- Clayface (Preston Payne) in Detective Comics #477 (June)
- Commander Steel in Steel, the Indestructible Man #1 (March)
- Count Vertigo in World's Finest Comics #251 (July)
- Doctor Mist in Super Friends #12 (June)
- Fadeaway Man in Detective Comics #479 (October)
- Firestorm in Firestorm #1 (March)
- Hyena in Firestorm #4 (September 1978)
- Killer Frost in Firestorm #3 (June)
- Madame Xanadu in Doorway to Nightmare #1 (February)
- Madame Zodiac in Batman Family #17 (April)
- Martin Stein in Firestorm #1 (March)
- Odd Man in Cancelled Comic Cavalcade #2 (September)
- Ronnie Raymond in Firestorm #1 (March)
- Multiplex in Firestorm #2 (April)
- Shvaughn Erin in Superboy and the Legion of Super-Heroes #241 (July)
- Ultraa in Justice League of America #153 (April)

=== Marvel Comics ===
- Arcade in Marvel Team-Up #65 (January)
- Ben Urich in Daredevil #153 (July)
- Big Wheel in The Amazing Spider-Man #182 (April)
- Bethany Cabe in Iron Man #117 (December)
- Carrion in Spectacular Spider-Man #25 (December)
- Devil Dinosaur in Devil Dinosaur #1 (April)
- Hoder in Thor #274 (August)
- Hypno-Hustler in Spectacular Spider-Man #24 (November)
- Kiber the Cruel in Black Panther #11 (September)
- Moon-Boy in Devil Dinosaur #1 (April)
- Moonstone in The Incredible Hulk #228 (October)
- Mystique in Ms. Marvel #16 (May)
- Vindicator in Uncanny X-Men #109 (February)
- Virako in Thor Annual #7 (June)
- Wendell Vaughn (Marvel Man) in Captain America #217 (January)
