= Michele Serra =

Italian journalist (born 1954)

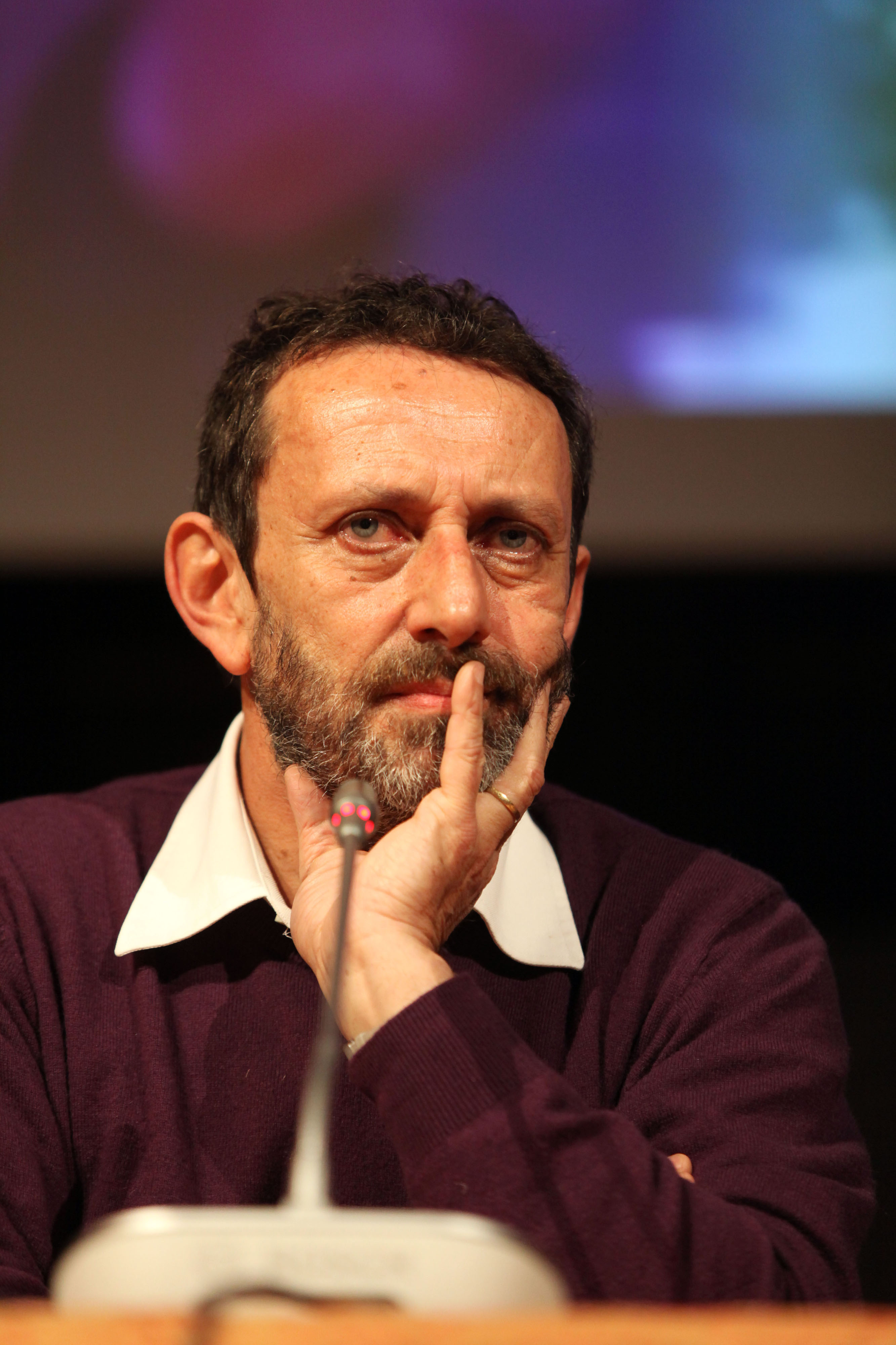
- Born: 10 July 1954 (age 72); Rome, Italy
- Years active: 1980–present

Michele Serra (born 10 July 1954) is an Italian journalist, writer, and satirist.

== Biography ==
Serra was born in Rome. His family moved to Milan in 1959 when he was 5. Serra enrolled to the University of Milan in 1972 but he dropped out after three years to start working for L'Unità, then the official newspaper of the Italian Communist Party (PCI).

In 1986, he began to write satire for L'Unità satiric supplement Tango, winning the Satire Prize Forte dei Marmi the same year. In 1987 he also started collaborating for Mondadori's weekly Epoca, but he quit it in 1990, when the publishing house was acquired by Silvio Berlusconi.

In 1988, Tango's editor, Sergio Staino, decided to discontinue the magazine. Following a one-year yatus, Tango was replaced by another satirical supplement called Cuore. Serra was appointed by Massimo D'Alema as the editor. Cuore was published weekly independently starting from 1991. In the same period Serra also began to write for Italian comedian Beppe Grillo.

In 1989, he published his first book, a short story collection entitled Il nuovo che avanza ("The Advancing New").

In 1991 Serra withdrew his support to PCI's successor, the Partito Democratico della Sinistra, because of dissent against the party's direction.

On 7 June 1992, Serra contributed a satire column for L'Unità, entitled "Che tempo fa" (The Weather Today) accompanied by Ellekappa's comics. In 1994 he left Cuore and was replaced by Caludio Sabelli Fioretti. In 1996, Serra began to collaborate for the newspaper La Repubblica and for the weekly L'Espresso. Serra's first novel, Il ragazzo mucca (The Cow Boy), was published in September 1997.

In the following years, Serra wrote for numerous TV and theatre shows, including Fabio Fazio's Che tempo che fa.

In 2025 he promoted the demonstration "Una Piazza per l'Europa-A square for Europe" on March 15 in Rome.

Serra is an ardent left-winger and an atheist.

== Works ==
- Giorgio Gaber. La canzone a teatro (1982)
- Tutti al mare (1986)
- Visti da lontano (1987)
- Ridateci la Potemkin (1988)
- Il nuovo che avanza (1989)
- 44 falsi (1991)
- Poetastro. Poesie per incartare l'insalata (1993)
- Il ragazzo mucca (1997)
- Maledetti giornalisti (with Goffredo Fofi and Gad Lerner, 1997)
- Che tempo fa (1999)
- Giù al Nord (with Antonio Albanese and Enzo Santin, 1999)
- Canzoni politiche (2000)
- Pinocchio Novecento (comments on Carlo Collodi text, 2001)
- Cerimonie (2002)
- De André il corsaro (with Fernanda Pivano and Cesare G. Romana, 2002)
- I bambini sono di sinistra (with Claudio Bisio, Giorgio Terruzzi, Giorgio Gallione and Gigio Alberti, 2005)
- Tutti i santi giorni (2006)
- Psicoparty (with Antonio Albanese, 2007)
- Breviario comico. A perpetua memoria (2008)
- L'assassino (2013)
- Gli sdraiati (2013)
- Ognuno potrebbe (2015)
- Il grande libro delle amache (2017)
- La sinistra e altre parole strane (2017)
- Le code che bruciano (2019)
- Osso. Anche i cani sognano (2021)
- Ballate. Dei tempi che corrono (2023)

== Gallery ==
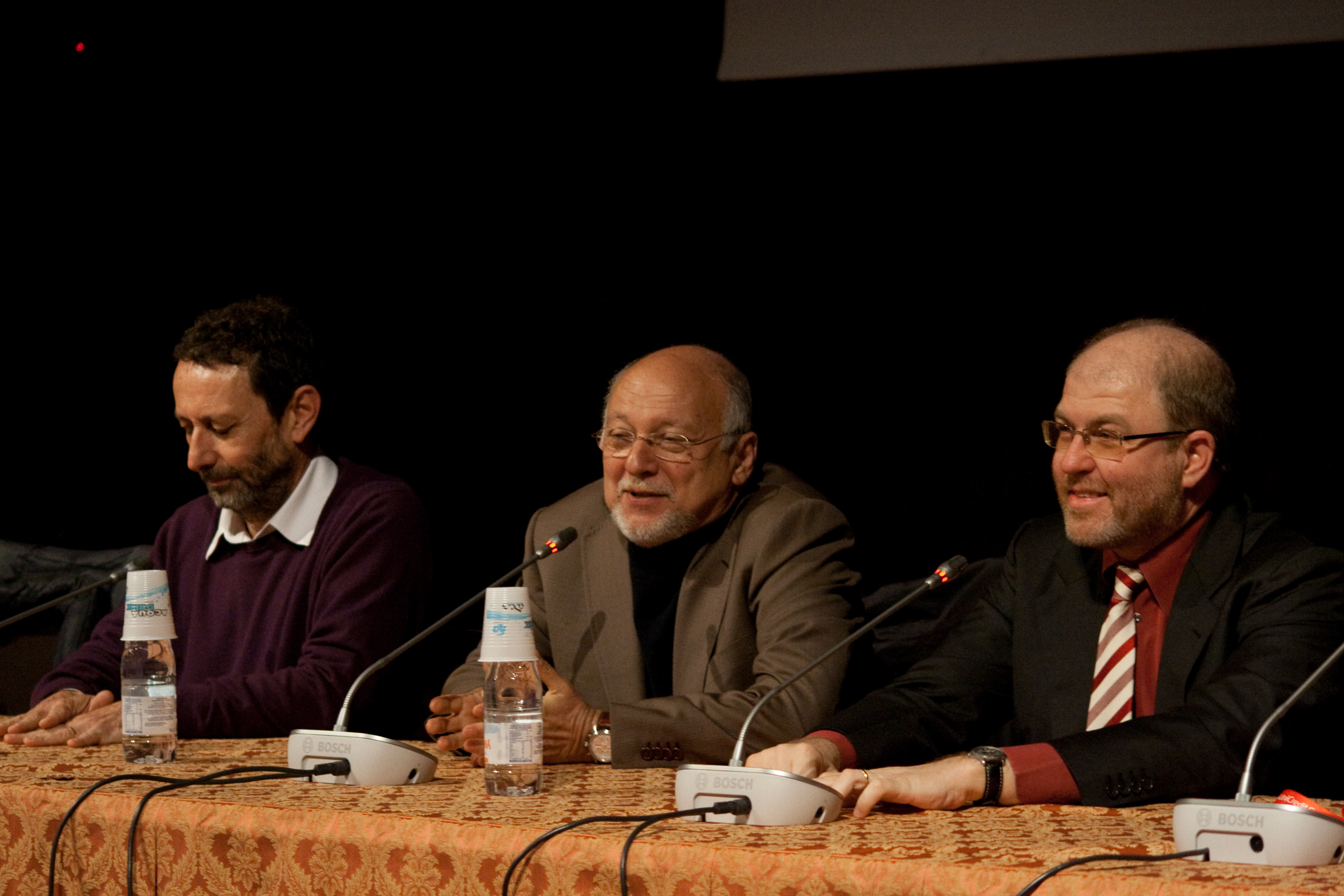
Left: Michele Serra, Vittorio Zucconi and Massimo Gramellini at the International Journalism Festival, Perugia, 2010
