= Giorgio Forattini =

Italian political cartoonist (1931–2025)

- Born: 14 March 1931; Rome, Italy
- Died: 4 November 2025 (aged 94); Milan, Italy
- Occupation: Cartoonist

Giorgio Forattini (14 March 1931 – 4 November 2025) was an Italian editorial cartoonist, caricaturist, and illustrator. From 1973, forward his cartoons have been published on the chief Italian newspapers. Forattini commented "with a corrosive and irreverent humor, the events of Italian and international political life." His cartoons have been published in many collections, including Referendum reverendum (1974), Quattro anni di storia italiana (1977), Nudi alla meta (1985), Insciaquà (1990), Bossic Instinct (1993), Il libro a colori del post-comunismo (1998), Foratt pride (2000), Oltre la Fifa (2002), Il Signore degli Agnelli (2004), Regimen (2006), Vaffancolor (2007), Revoluscon (2008), Satiromantico (2009), Siamo uomini o giornalisti? (2010), Eurodeliri (2011), Fateci la carità (2012), Napoleonitano (2013), Arieccoci (2016), and Abbecedario della politica (2017).

== Life and career ==
Forattini was born in Rome on 14 March 1931. His parents were both from Rome. His father, a chemist, was originally from Guastalla, Reggio Emilia, while his mother was of Istrian Italian origin.

He graduated from classical high school, then enrolled in the Faculty of Architecture at the University of Rome. He married very young, therefore he abandoned his studies and began looking for work. Forattini was employed in many capacities, including: consultant for a music publishing house, actor, worker in the hydrocarbon industry, and salesman.

In the early nineteen seventies, he took part in a competition organized by the political newspaper Paese Sera. Forattini stated: “I created a strip with a protagonist named Stradivarius, a sales rep. He was a bit romantic, he loved music and when he got home he would play the violin with a wig on his head." He won the competition, and was hired as a draughtsman and graphic designer, collaborating to the layout of the newspaper.

On 14 May 1974, he proposed a cartoon to illustrate the news of the day: the victory of the "No" in the divorce referendum. The cartoon was published on the newspaper's front page. His activity was considered journalistic. In fact since 1975, after passing the state exam, he had been registered as a professional journalist in the Order of Journalists of Lazio. His career continued at Panorama, with which he still collaborated until the end of his days and finally arrived at the nascent newspaper La Repubblica. In 1978 he created the insert Satyricon, the first insert in an Italian periodical devoted entirely to satire. With Forattini they published some new signatures, including Sergio Staino and Ellekappa. In September 1979, he accepted the direction of the satirical newspaper Il Male.

In 1982, he was called by Turin's La Stampa, with which he returned to the first pages and was acclaimed for his work. Forattini's cartoons were the first to be published on the first page of a national newspaper in Italy, and they were issued on a daily basis (another novelty for the Italian press). In 1984, he returned to the Roman newspaper, continuing to publish one cartoon a day for the front page. After 16 years of uninterrupted collaboration, in 2000 Forattini left la Repubblica following the controversy ensuing from a cartoon depicting Massimo D'Alema, for which the cartoonist was sued.

From 2000 to February 2005, he was again the cartoonist of La Stampa. From 2006 to mid-2008, he collaborated with Il Giornale, which he later left due to some disagreements with the new director Mario Giordano. On 2 August 2008, he began a collaboration with the three newspapers of QN Quotidiano Nazionale.

One of the main reasons for his success was the caricatural and somewhat irreverent characterization of some politicians: Bettino Craxi dressed as Benito Mussolini, Giovanni Spadolini naked, Massimo D'Alema as Adolf Hitler (but in a communist guise), Giovanni Goria invisible, Piero Fassino skeletal, Giuliano Amato as Mickey Mouse, Silvio Berlusconi and Amintore Fanfani short in stature, Walter Veltroni like a caterpillar, Lamberto Dini like a toad, Rocco Buttiglione like a monkey, Nicola Mancino like a boar, Luciano Violante like a fox, Romano Prodi like a communist priest, Umberto Bossi like Pluto, Vincenzo Visco like a vampire, Carlo Azeglio Ciampi like a dog, and Antonio Di Pietro like Mussolini.

In 2012, he declared that he disliked political parties: "I hate fundamentalism. I can't stand a party that professes 'whoever is not with me is against me'. To be honest, I can't stand any party."

Forattini died in Milan on 4 November 2025, at the age of 94.

== Most discussed cartoons ==
One of his best known cartoons is the one he did in 1974 on the occasion of the victory of the no in the referendum on divorce: it represented a bottle of sparkling wine on which was written "NO" that was uncorked by throwing in the air a cork that had the features of Amintore Fanfani.

Forattini was sued and convicted for a cartoon on Bettino Craxi, in which the socialist leader is depicted reading La Repubblica and commenting "How much I like this newspaper when there is Portfolio!" (Portfolio was a contest attached to the newspaper), with the evident implication that Craxi was a pickpocket. Forattini was convicted because, according to the judge's motivations, the implication was clearly false.

Also famous is the cartoon depicting Craxi upside down with a noose tied to his feet. This cartoon dates back to April 1993 and was produced immediately following the news of the Italian Parliament's vote against the release of authorizations to the Milan Public Prosecutor to proceed against the socialist leader.

In 1991, when the Democratic Party of the Left was accused of still receiving the funding that the USSR had guaranteed for years to the Italian Communist Party, Forattini presented a cartoon in which Achille Occhetto and Massimo D'Alema were seen dressed as prostitutes, they received money from Mikhail Gorbachev, sitting in a luxurious car at the wheel of which was Enrico Berlinguer. Occhetto immediately sued Forattini, followed by D'Alema. In 1994, the court of Milan condemned the cartoonist on the grounds that "the cartoon is not pure and simple satirical expression but a real vehicle of journalistic information and, as such, subject to the limits of the diritto di cronaca."

For a cartoon depicting D'Alema, then Prime Minister, published in la Repubblica on 11 October 1999 he was sued and asked for compensation of 3 billion lire. The cartoon in question depicts D'Alema while with a white-out ereasing the Mitrokhin list and a voice asking him: "So is this list coming?!!" (allora arriva 'sta lista?!) and D'Alema replying, "Wait a minute! The white-out hasn't dried yet!" (Un momento! Non s'è ancora asciugato il bianchetto!). D'Alema then declared that he held satire in the highest consideration, but that he decided to press charges because of the defamation of the cartoon and the false information in it. The lawsuit would be withdrawn in 2001.

Following this vicissitude, not feeling defended by the newspaper he was working for, Forattini decided to leave la Repubblica. Subsequently in protest against the lawsuit and in defense of the freedom of satire he drew for several months D'Alema with an invisible face and only apparent hats and mustaches. This cartoon was repeated four times with different protagonists.

In 2005, Forattini returned to the story of the lawsuit with a cartoon on Panorama entitled Rivoluzionari di lusso, where a voiceover announces: "D'Alema got Fiorani to give him the money for his new boat!" and he, in the guise of himself, replies: "He also wanted them from me, but I didn't give them to him!"

On 3 April 2002, Forattini published in la Stampa a cartoon depicting an Israeli tank, marked with the Star of David, while aiming the cannon towards a manger in which a frightened child, identifiable in Jesus by the halo on his head, exclaims: "They don't want to kill me again?!". The cartoon provoked the indignation of the president of the Union of Italian Jewish Communities Amos Luzzatto, who stigmatizes the exhumation of the accusation of deicide, and of various Catholic exponents. The then director of the Turin newspaper, Marcello Sorgi, publicly dissociated himself from the content of the cartoon.

On 6 November 2008, the QN Quotidiano Nazionale (Il Giorno, La Nazione, and il Resto del Carlino) published a cartoon by Forattini on the election of Barack Obama as President of the United States, in which former President Bush says, to a Statue of Liberty lying on a bed with a newborn with the face of Obama, that she cheated on him with the "black butler". This cartoon has given rise to a lot of controversy. The Coordination of the editorial committees of the Quotidiano Nazionale expressed in a note "firm and total dissent" against the cartoon.

At TG5 on 17 December 2008, he declared that he had been sued 20 times only by leftists, stating: "The left does not accept satire when it is directed against it."

== Works ==
Beginning in 1974, the year in which he published his first book of cartoons, Referendum Reverendum, Forattini published a long series of publications, with the aim of satirically representing the evolution of Italian political events.

- Referendum reverendum, presentazione di Franco Monicelli, Milano, Feltrinelli, 1974.
- Quattro anni di storia italiana, con un commento di Giorgio Bocca, Milano, A. Mondadori, 1977.
- Un'idea al giorno, Milano, A. Mondadori, 1978.
- Librus, Milano, A. Mondadori, 1979.
- Res publica, con un'intervista di Giampaolo Pansa, Milano, A. Mondadori, 1980.
- Satyricon, Milano, A. Mondadori, 1982.
- Scomodoso, introduzione di Guido Ceronetti, Milano, A. Mondadori, 1983.
- Pagine gialle, Milano, A. Mondadori, 1984.
- Illustrazioni di Mimmo Scarano e Maurizio De Luca, Il presidente prossimo venturo, Milano, Longanesi, 1985. ISBN 88-304-0564-7.
- Nudi alla meta, Milano, A. Mondadori, 1985.
- Forattini classic. [1974-1979], Milano, Panorama, 1986.
- Forattini classic. [1980-1984], Milano, Panorama, 1986.
- Illustrazioni di Mirella Delfini, Insetto sarai tu, Milano, A. Mondadori, 1986.
- Provocazia, prefazione di Oreste Del Buono, Milano, A. Mondadori, 1986.
- Giorgio e il drago, Milano, A. Mondadori, 1987. ISBN 88-04-30559-2.
- Il kualunquista, Milano, A. Mondadori, 1988. ISBN 88-04-32162-8.
- Stradivarius. I sogni nell'archetto, Milano, A. Mondadori, 1989. ISBN 88-04-32520-8.
- Vignette sataniche, Milano, A. Mondadori, 1989. ISBN 88-04-32973-4.
- Gli esclamativi di Forattini, Milano, A. Mondadori, 1990.
- Insciaqquà, Milano, A. Mondadori, 1990. ISBN 88-04-33686-2.
- Forattini classic, I, Forattini 1974-1979, Milano, A. Mondadori, 1991.
- Forattini classic, II, Forattini 1980-1984, Milano, A. Mondadori, 1991.
- Forattini classic, III, Forattini 1985-1990, Milano, A. Mondadori, 1991.
- Pizza rossa, Milano, A. Mondadori, 1991. ISBN 88-04-34975-1.
- Il mascalzone, Milano, A. Mondadori, 1992. ISBN 88-04-36246-4.
- Forattinopoli. Storia della corruzione in Italia, raccontata da e con Paolo Guzzanti, 2 voll., Milano, A. Mondadori, 1993.
- Bossic instinct, Milano, A. Mondadori, 1993. ISBN 88-04-37481-0.
- Benito di Tacco. Craxi story 1976-1993, Milano, A. Mondadori, 1993. ISBN 88-04-37510-8.
- Andreàcula. Andreotti story 1976-1993, Milano, A. Mondadori, 1993. ISBN 88-04-37540-X; 1996. ISBN 88-04-41689-0.
- Karaoketto. Pcus-Pci-Pds 1973-1994, Milano, A. Mondadori, 1994. ISBN 88-04-38370-4.
- Il garante di Lady Chatterley, Milano, A. Mondadori, 1994. ISBN 88-04-38764-5.
- Giovanni Paolo secondo Forattini, 1978-1995, Milano, A. Mondadori, 1995. ISBN 88-04-40088-9.
- Va' dove ti porta il rospo, Milano, A. Mondadori, 1995. ISBN 88-04-40174-5.
- Berluscopone, Milano, A. Mondadori, 1996. ISBN 88-04-41377-8.
- Il forattone, Milano, Mondadori, 1996. ISBN 88-04-41738-2.
- Io e il bruco, Milano, Mondadori, 1997. ISBN 88-04-42980-1.
- Paparazzo, Milano, Mondadori, 1997. ISBN 88-04-43261-6.
- Il libro a colori del post-comunismo, Milano, Mondadori, 1998. ISBN 88-04-45054-1.
- Disegni in Mirella Delfini, La vita segreta degli insetti geniali, Padova, Muzzio, 1998. ISBN 88-7021-853-8.
- Taxgate, Milano, Mondadori, 1998. ISBN 88-04-45549-7.
- Millennium flop, Milano, Mondadori, 1999. ISBN 88-04-46757-6.
- Oscar alla regia. Storia di un settennato, Milano, Mondadori, 1999. ISBN 88-04-46810-6.
- Sotto il baffetto niente. La resistibile ascesa del leader Massimo, Milano, Mondadori, 2000. ISBN 88-04-48159-5.
- Foratt pride, Milano, Mondadori, 2000. ISBN 88-04-48367-9.
- Ciappi. Un presidente di razza, Milano, Mondadori, 2001. ISBN 88-04-49686-X.
- Glob, Milano, Mondadori, 2001. ISBN 88-04-49720-3.
- Oltre la fifa, Milano, Mondadori, 2002. ISBN 88-04-50302-5.
- Kosferatu. Uno spettro s'aggira per le piazze, Milano, Mondadori, 2002. ISBN 88-04-50925-2.
- Hurk, Milano, Mondadori, 2003. ISBN 88-04-51489-2.
- Guera & pace. La guerra tra America e Iraq vista da un italiano, Milano, Mondadori, 2003. ISBN 88-04-52084-1.
- Il signore degli Agnelli, Torino, La Stampa, 2004.
- Forattini e altri animali. Un anno di vignette, Milano, Mondadori, 2004. ISBN 88-04-53592-X.
- Coalizione da Tiffany, Milano, Mondadori, 2005. ISBN 88-04-54934-3.
- Regimen. Un anno nella giungla del potere, Milano, Mondadori, 2006. ISBN 88-04-56009-6.
- Vaffancolor. Un anno di politica a colori, Milano, Mondadori, 2007. ISBN 978-88-04-57575-7.
- Revoluscon. La campagna d'Italia, Milano, Mondadori, 2008. ISBN 978-88-04-58398-1.
- Satiromantico, Milano, Mondadori, 2009. ISBN 978-88-04-59472-7.
- Siamo uomini o giornalisti?, Milano, Mondadori, 2010. ISBN 978-88-04-60462-4.
- Eurodeliri, Milano, Mondadori, 2011. ISBN 978-88-04-61423-4.
- Fateci la carità, Milano, Mondadori, 2012. ISBN 978-88-04-62529-2.
- Napoleonitano, Milano, Mondadori, 2013. ISBN 978-88-04-63066-1.
- Papatràc, Milano, Oscar Mondadori, 2013. ISBN 978-88-04-63141-5.
- Guai ai vincitori, Milano, Mondadori, 2013. ISBN 978-88-04-63415-7.
- C'era una volta un pezzo di legno..., Milano, Mondadori, 2014. ISBN 978-88-04-64658-7.
- Il Forattone. 1973-2015. Mezzo secolo di satira, Milano, Mondadori, 2015. ISBN 978-88-04-65848-1.
- Arièccoci. La Storia si ripete, Milano, Mondadori, 2016. ISBN 978-88-04-67278-4.
- Abbecedario della politica, Firenze, Clichy, 2017. ISBN 978-88-6799-366-6.
