= Vauro Senesi =

Italian journalist and satirical cartoonist

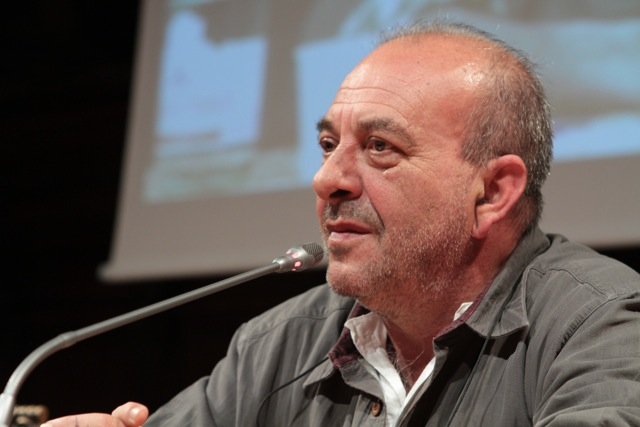
- Born: 24 March 1955 (age 70); Pistoia, Italy
- Occupation(s): journalist, satirical cartoonist
- Height: 1.76 m (5 ft 9 in)

Vauro Senesi (born 24 March 1955), often known mononymously as Vauro, is an Italian journalist and satirical cartoonist.

Vauro was born in Pistoia. He was Pino Zac's apprentice, and, together with Giancarlo Fusco, Cinzia Leone and others, in September 1978 they founded Il Male, a satirical weekly newspaper. It was published until March 1982.

His cartoons have been published in magazines such as Satyricon, Linus, Cuore, I quaderni del Sale, L'Echo des Savanes and El Jueves.

He is director of the satirical e-weekly Boxer, collaborator of Il Corriere della Sera and Smemoranda. In 1996, he won the Political Satirist Prize of Forte dei Marmi. Vauro received international attention in 2009 when he was dismissed from RAI over controversial drawings he had shown during a broadcast of the series Annozero.

In June 2011, Senesi announced his intention to sail with the Free Gaza Flotilla setting out to defy the Israeli blockade of the Gaza Strip. He published in Il Manifesto an "Open Letter to an Admiral", addressed to Admiral Eli Marom of the Israeli Navy and setting out his reasons for this act.
