= Bobo (Italian comics) =

- Genre: Satiric, autobiographical

Bobo is the title character of an eponym Italian comic strip created in 1979 by Sergio Staino. It was referred as a symbol of a whole generation.

The first comic strip of Bobo was created October 10, 1979 and was published in Linus in December of the same year. The comics later appeared in a large number of magazines and newspapers, including L'Unità, Il Corriere della Sera, Il Venerdì di Repubblica, Il Messaggero, L'espresso, Panorama, Cuore, TV Sorrisi e Canzoni.

The comic strip is pretty autobiographical, and the title character, a middle-aged former Communist average man struggling with family, politics and hobbies, is a self-portrait of the same author.

The same Staino starred in a live-action transposition of the comics, hosted in a segment of the television variety Drive In, in the 1984/1985 season.
