= Chiappori =

Chiappori is an Italian surname. Notable people with the surname include:

- Alfredo Chiappori (1943–2022), Italian cartoonist
- Pierre-André Chiappori (fl. from 1974), French economist
