= Stefano Benni =

Italian writer and journalist (1947–2025)

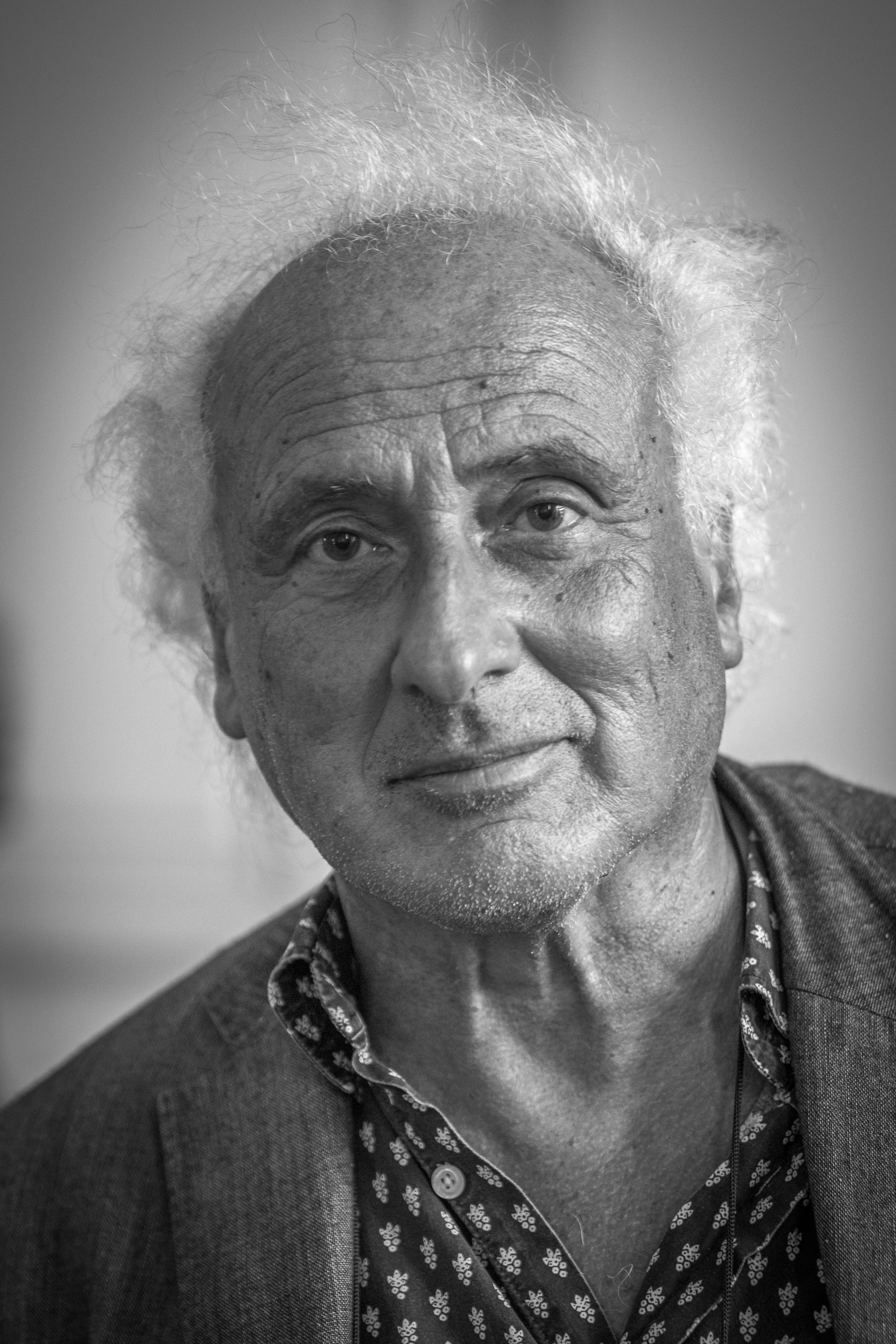
- Benni in 2013
- Born: 12 August 1947; Bologna, Italy
- Died: 9 September 2025 (aged 78); Bologna, Italy
- Occupations: Writer, poet, journalist

Stefano Benni (12 August 1947 – 9 September 2025) was an Italian satirical writer, poet and journalist. His books have been translated into around 20 foreign languages and scored notable commercial success. 2.5 million copies of his books have been sold in Italy.

== Literary career ==
Benni emerged as a journalist and essayist when he was a student. Benni worked with the weekly magazines L'espresso and Panorama, and with the satirical Cuore and Tango, the monthly magazines Linus and Il Mago (where he began and published in installments part of Bar Sport), and the newspapers La Repubblica and il manifesto.

His debut book, a collection of short stories titled "Bar Sport (libro)", was published in 1976. This comedy became an instant hit and launched Benni into the ranks of Italy's most popular authors.

Since then, he has worked in a wide variety of genres, but has always maintained his unique style blending humor, melancholy, social criticism and a poetic perspective. So-called ‘stile benniano’ is characterized by linguistic inventions, neologisms, wordplay, and irony that conceals profound reflections. His books were translated into more than 30 languages.

Benni also wrote television sketches for Beppe Grillo at the beginning of Grillo's career, and one of these sketches – called "Pietro Longo=P2" – caused the Psdi to ask the RAI commission to remove Grillo from RAI TV; their request was denied. In 1987, he wrote the screenplay to Topo Galileo, a film by Francesco Laudadio, starring his friend Beppe Grillo and with music by Fabrizio De André and Mauro Pagani.

In 1989, with Umberto Angelucci, Benni co-directed the film Musica per vecchi animali, adapted from his book Comici spaventati guerrieri, with the actors Dario Fo, Paolo Rossi, and Viola Simoncioni.

With the jazz musician Umberto Petrin, he wrote Misterioso. Viaggio nel silenzio di Thelonius Monk.

In 2015, he turned down the Vittorio De Sica award. On his Facebook page, Benni explained the refusal: it was a protest against the budget cuts to school education and culture implemented by Matteo Renzi's government.

Benni died in Bologna on 9 September 2025 after a long illness, at the age of 78.

== Personal life ==
Little is known for sure about Benni's personal life. Benni has in fact stated that, over the years, he has written and circulated numerous deliberately fictionalized or made-up versions of his own life, poking fun at the media’s tendency not to verify the biographical details of writers. The confirmed facts are that he was born in 1947 in Bologna but spent his childhood in the Apennines, roaming the woods – which earned him the nickname "Lupo".

He was a close friend of the French writer Daniel Pennac. It was Benni who persuaded Feltrinelli to translate and publish in Italy the first works of Pennac.

Benni died in Rome on 9 September 2025 after a long illness, at the age of 78.

== Bibliography ==
Some of his published works are:

- Bar Sport (libro), Milano, Mondadori (1976); Feltrinelli, 1997. ISBN 88-07-81434-X
- Prima o poi l'amore arriva (1981)
- Terra! (1983), translated into English by Annapaola Cancogni (1985) (Pantheon Books) ISBN 88-07-04003-4
- Stranalandia (1984)
- Comici spaventati guerrieri (1986) ISBN 88-07-01316-9
- Il bar sotto il mare (1987)
- Baol (1990) ISBN 88-07-01409-2
- Ballate (1991)
- La compagnia dei Celestini (1992) ISBN 88-07-01446-7
- L'ultima lacrima (1994)
- Elianto (1996)
- Bar Sport Duemila (1997)
- Blues in sedici (1998)
- Teatro (1999)
- Spiriti (2000)
- Dottor Niù, corsivi diabolici per tragedie evitabili (2001)
- Saltatempo (2001), translated into English by Antony Shugaar as Timeskipper (2008)
- Achille pie' veloce (2003)
- Margherita Dolcevita (2005)
- Misterioso : viaggio nel silenzio di Thelonious Monk (2005) (includes DVD)
- La grammatica di Dio (2007)
- Pane e Tempesta (2009)
- Le Beatrici (2011)
- La Traccia dell'Angelo (2011)
- Di tutte le ricchezze (2012)
- La bottiglia magica (2016)
- Prendiluna (2017)
- Giura (2020)

=== Works in English ===
- Terra, Pantheon Books, New York, 1985. ISBN 978-0-394-74064-5
- Timeskipper, translator Antony Shugaar, Europa Editions, New York, 2008. ISBN 978-1-933372-44-0
- Margherita Dolce Vita, translator Antony Shugaar, Europa Editions, New York, 2008. ISBN 978-1-933372-20-4
- The story of Cyrano de Bergerac, translated by Howard Curtis, Pushkin Children's Books, London, 2014. ISBN 978-1-78269-021-4
