= Lunari =

Lunari is a surname. Notable people with the surname include:

- Enzo Lunari (born 1937), Italian cartoonist
- Luigi Lunari (1934–2019), Italian playwright
- Ricardo Lunari (born 1970), Argentine football manager and former player
