= Massimo Cavezzali =

Italian comic artist (1950–2023)

- Born: 11 February 1950; Ravenna, Italy
- Died: 10 May 2023 (aged 73); Florence, Italy
- Other name: Cavez
- Occupation: Cartoonist

Massimo Cavezzali (11 February 1950 – 10 May 2023), also known as Cavez, was an Italian comic artist and illustrator, whose career spanned over 40 years.

== Life and career ==
Born in Ravenna, Cavezzali started his career in 1976, collaborating with the comics magazine Il Mago. He then collaborated with numerous comics magazines including Il Monello, Lupo Alberto, Orient Express, Tango, Il Grifo and Comix, as well as with newspapers such as La Repubblica, La Stampa, L'Unità, Paese Sera. Among his best known works is Ava, a comic strip about a sexy anthropomorphized duck, and DIO S.p.a., a comic strip about a fictional God. In 2004 he illustrated Ogni volta che sono Vasco, a comic biography about singer-songwriter Vasco Rossi. Among his last works is Comic Submarine, a fictionalized biographical graphic novel about The Beatles.

Cavezzali died on 10 May 2023, at the age of 73.
