= David Riondino =

Italian singer-songwriter and actor (1952–2026)

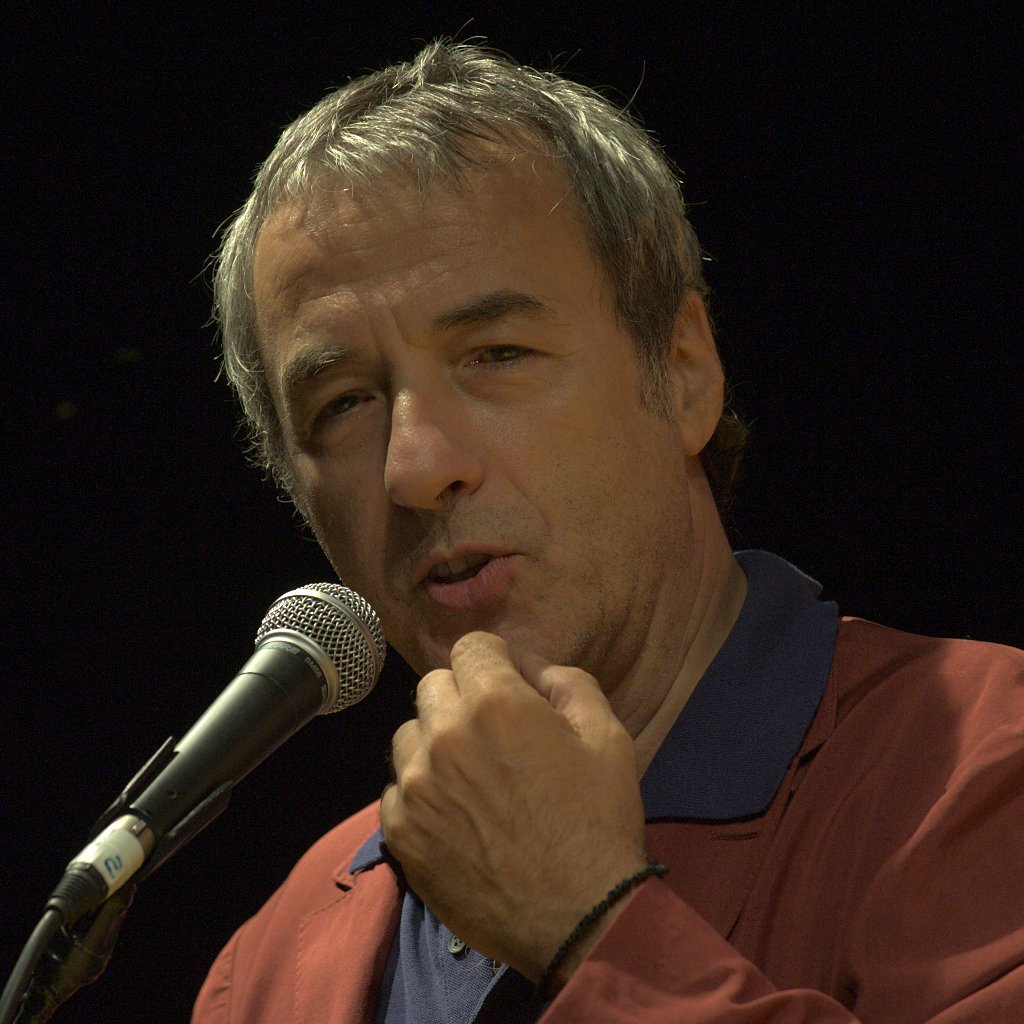

Background information
- Born: 10 June 1952; Florence, Italy
- Died: 29 March 2026 (aged 73) Rome, Italy
- Occupations: Guitarist; singer-songwriter
- Instruments: Vocals; guitar
- Years active: 1974–2026
- Website: davidriondino.com

David Riondino (10 June 1952 – 29 March 2026) was an Italian singer-songwriter, actor, comedian, writer, playwright, screenwriter, director and composer.

== Life and career ==
Riondino was born in Florence, Italy on 10 June 1952, the son of a teacher. He started his career in the mid-1970s as a member of the musical ensemble Collettivo Victor Jara. In 1979 he made his solo debut with the album David Riondino, and the same year he was the opening act in a series of concerts by Fabrizio De André and Premiata Forneria Marconi, including those in Florence and Bologna, where De André's live album Fabrizio De André in concerto - Arrangiamenti PFM was recorded. In 1980, following his second album, Boulevard, with arrangements by Shel Shapiro, he focused on his live performances, where he mixed improvisation, music, and cabaret.

Starting from the second half of the 1980s Riondino enjoyed a large success thanks to the semi-regular participation in the Canale 5 show Maurizio Costanzo Show, where he used to improvise surreal songs imitating the style of the Brazilian singer-songwriters. In 1987 he released his third album Tango dei miracoli, whose booklet was illustrated by Milo Manara.

Riondino's variagated career includes films, TV series, comedy plays as well as novels, poems and several collaborations with newspapers and magazines as a humorist and a semi-serious columnist.

Riondino died in Rome on the morning of 29 March 2026, at the age of 73.

== Filmography ==
- To Love the Damned (1980)
- The Night of the Shooting Stars (1982)
- Kamikazen: Last Night in Milan (1987)
- Zanzibar (TV, 1988)
- Cavalli si nasce (1989)
- La cattedra (1991)
- Ilona Arrives with the Rain (1996)
- Cuba Libre – Velocipedi ai tropici (1997, also director)
- Donna selvaggia (1998)
- Vado e torno (TV, 1998)
- L'erba proibita (2002)
- Viva Zapatero! (2005)
- L'uomo che aveva picchiato la testa (2009)
- Amici miei – Come tutto ebbe inizio (2011)
- The Invisible Player (2016)

== Discography ==
- 1979 – David Riondino (Ultima Spiaggia, ZPLS 34061)
- 1980 – Boulevard (RCA Italiana, PL 31547)
- 1987 – Tango dei miracoli (L'ALTernativa, ALT 003)
- 1989 – Racconti picareschi (CGD, CGD 20932)
- 1991 – Non svegliate l'amore (CGD, CGD 9031 74383-1)
- 1994 – Temporale (CGD, CGD 4509 96185-2)
- 1995 – Quando vengono le ballerine? (Rossodisera Records-Sony, RDS 480351)

== Books ==
- Rombi e milonghe. João Mesquinho e altre canzoni. Feltrinelli, 1993. ISBN 88-07-81231-2.
- Viaggio a Cuba, with Valerio Peretti Cucchi. Zelig, 1997. ISBN 88-86471-49-1.
- Epos 92–97. L'Italia in terzine da Tangentopoli all'Ulivo, Grugliasco, Edizioni Arti grafiche San Rocco, 1998. ISBN 88-900156-1-6.
- Rumba. Itinerari cubani al ritmo della capitale, con Roberto Perini, Milano, Lizard, 1999. ISBN 88-86456-70-0.
- Dante Inferno, with Sandro Lombardi, con CD, Milano, Garzanti, 2002. ISBN 88-11-12007-1.
- Cantata dei pastori immobili. Racconto di un presepe vivente, illustrations by Sergio Staino. Donzelli, 2004. ISBN 88-7989-900-7.
- John Martin. Il trombettiere di Apricale. Da Garibaldi a Custer, with Claudio Nobbio. Fratelli Frilli, 2007. ISBN 978-88-7563-312-7.
- Firenze. Effequ, 2013. ISBN 978-88-89647-85-1.
