= Paolo Spriano =

Italian historian and writer (1925–1988)

Paolo Spriano (30 November 1925 – 26 September 1988) was an Italian historian of the Italian labor and communist movement.

== Career ==
Spriano studied at the University of Turin. He joined partisans of the Italian Resistance and was a member of the Giustizia e Libertà. After the war he became a journalist for l'Unita and in 1946 joined the Italian Communist Party and was subsequently elected a member of its central committee. He was one of members of the PCI who opposed the Soviet suppression of the Hungarian 1956 uprising. All his historiographical production is centered on moments and figures of the Italian and international labor movement. In the last years of his life he was full professor of History of political parties at the La Sapienza University of Rome.

He died in Rome on September 26, 1988. According to Massimo D'Alema, Spriano's "sudden death broke the thread of his work. The papers on his table remained, the notes, the first notes." He was examining the documents handed to him by Gorbachev to demonstrate Soviet interest in Gramsci's release from fascist prisons. The books from his private library were donated by his family to the Gramsci Foundation in Rome.

== Works ==
- Il salario in Italia, con Luca Pavolini, Editori riuniti, Roma 1957.
- Socialismo e classe operaia a Torino dal 1892 al 1913, Einaudi, Torino 1958.
- Torino operaia nella grande guerra (1914-1918), Einaudi, Torino 1960.
- L'occupazione delle fabbriche. Settembre 1920 (The occupation of Factories. September 1920) Einaudi, Torino 1964.
- Gramsci e l'Ordine nuovo, Einaudi, Torino 1965.
- Storia del Partito Comunista Italiano, I, Da Bordiga a Gramsci, Einaudi, Torino 1967.
- Storia del Partito Comunista Italiano, II, Gli anni della clandestinità, Einaudi, Torino 1969.
- Storia del Partito Comunista Italiano, III, I fronti popolari, Stalin, la guerra, Einaudi, Torino 1970.
- L'Ordine Nuovo e i consigli di fabbrica, Einaudi, Torino 1971.
- Storia di Torino operaia e socialista. Da De Amicis a Gramsci, Einaudi, Torino 1972.
- Storia del Partito Comunista Italiano, IV, La fine del fascismo. Dalla riscossa operaia alla lotta armata, Einaudi, Torino 1973.
- Storia del Partito Comunista Italiano, V, La resistenza, Togliatti e il partito nuovo, Einaudi, Torino 1975.
- La politica del partito comunista italiano dalla resistenza alla repubblica, Estratto da: Storia e politica, a. 14, fasc. 1-2, 1975, Giuffré, Milano 1975.
- Gramsci e Gobetti. Introduzione alla vita e alle opere, Einaudi, Torino 1977.
- Gramsci in carcere e il partito, Editori riuniti, Roma 1977.
- Sulla rivoluzione italiana, Einaudi, Torino 1978.
- Intervista sulla storia del PCI, Laterza, Roma-Bari 1979.
- Il compagno Ercoli. Togliatti segretario dell'Internazionale, Editori riuniti, Roma 1980.
- I comunisti europei e Stalin, Einaudi, Torino 1983.
- Le passioni di un decennio. 1946-1956, Garzanti, Milano 1986.
- L'ultima ricerca di Paolo Spriano. Dagli archivi dell'URSS i documenti segreti per salvare Antonio Gramsci, in "L'Unità", Roma 1988.
