= John Carter, Warlord of Mars =

Marvel Comics series

- First issue of John Carter, Warlord of Mars

Publication information
- Publisher: Marvel Comics
- Format: Ongoing series
- Genre: Science fiction
- Publication date: June 1977 – October 1979
- No. of issues: 28 + 3 annuals

Creative team
- Written by: Marv Wolfman; Chris Claremont; Peter B. Gillis
- Penciller(s): Gil Kane; Carmine Infantino; Ernie Colón; Larry Hama
- Inker(s): Dave Cockrum; Rudy Nebres; Ricardo Villamonte
- Letterer(s): Joe Rosen; Jim Novak; Diana Albers
- Colorist(s): Glynis Wein; Bob Sharen
- Editor(s): Marv Wolfman; Roger Stern

Collected editions
- John Carter of Mars: Warlord of Mars: ISBN 1-59582-692-0

John Carter, Warlord of Mars is a comics series published from 1977 by American company Marvel Comics. Created by Marv Wolfman (writer) and Gil Kane (penciller), it was based on the Barsoom series of Edgar Rice Burroughs and featured the eponymous character.

The entire series (with few exceptions) takes place between the third and fourth paragraphs of chapter 27 of Burroughs' novel A Princess of Mars.

The series ran from 1977 to 1979. In 1978 it won the "Favourite New Title" Eagle Award.

== Other comics featuring the character ==
Dell Comics released three issues of John Carter of Mars under its Four Color Comics banner. The issue numbers are 375, 437, and 488, and were released in 1952-1953. Gold Key Comics would reprint them as three issues in 1964, numbering one through three, but reprinted them out of order. Dark Horse Comics in 2010 reprinted the comics in a hard back archive edition.

John Carter appeared in DC Comics' Tarzan comics #207-209, then Weird Worlds #1-7 and Tarzan Family 62-64 in the early 1970s.

There was also a four-issue mini-series cross-over in 1996 with another of Burroughs' characters, Tarzan, in Tarzan/John Carter: Warlords of Mars from Dark Horse Comics.

In September 2002, John Carter appeared in the first issue of The League of Extraordinary Gentlemen’s second volume. He and Gullivar Jones have assembled an alliance of Martian races to combat an invading race of non-Martian aliens called "Molluscs" (the aliens from H. G. Wells' The War of the Worlds). After a fierce battle, the Martian alliance successfully force the Molluscs to leave Mars, but Carter worries that they might go to Earth.

Starting in October 2010, Dynamite Entertainment began publishing a regular series entitled Warlord of Mars. The first two issues served as a prelude story, issues 3-9 adapted A Princess of Mars, and issues 10-12 were an original story with following issues alternating between adaptation and new stories. This series ceased with #35, accompanied by two out-of-numbering issues (#100 and #0), in 2014.

In 2011, Marvel published two mini-series, John Carter: A Princess of Mars, by Roger Langridge (scripts) and Filipe Andrade (art), and John Carter: World of Mars, by Peter David (scripts) and Luke Ross (art), a prequel to the Disney Movie. In 2012, Marvel published a new miniseries entitled John Carter: Gods of Mars, based on the novel the Gods of Mars, with scripts by Sam Humphries and art by Ramon Perez.

In 2014, Edgar Rice Burroughs, Inc. initiated the publication of webcomic Warlord of Mars by Roy Thomas (script) and Rodolfo Pérez García (art).

=== Newspaper strip ===
In 1941, John Coleman Burroughs wrote and illustrated 69 weeks of a syndicated colour Sunday newspaper strip, John Carter of Mars, which debuted in The Chicago Sun on December 7, 1941. This debut coincided with the Japanese attack on Pearl Harbor, resulting in the series being picked up by very few papers. The strip began with a Princess of Mars adaptation but departed from the original with episode 5. John Coleman Burroughs explained that this was done at the request of United Features Syndicate, in order to provide more action in the weekly episodes. Continuing with the Burroughs tradition of family involvement, John's wife, Jane Ralston Burroughs, helped with the backgrounds, inking, and lettering of the strip and even served as model for Dejah Thoris.

== Collected editions ==
Dark Horse Comics have collected the Marvel series as a single black-and-white trade paperback:

- John Carter of Mars: Warlord of Mars (paperback, 632 pages, March 2011, ISBN 1-59582-692-0)

They also released a collection of the DC series:

- John Carter of Mars: Weird Worlds (paperback, 112 pages, January 2011, ISBN 1-59582-621-1)

as well as the earlier Dell Comics one:

- Edgar Rice Burroughs' John Carter of Mars: The Jesse Marsh Years (hardcover, 120 pages, May 2010, ISBN 1-59582-471-5)

Marvel Comics has released their entire series as an oversized hardcover omnibus. Unlike the Dark Horse reprint, the omnibus is in full color:

- John Carter, Warlord of Mars Omnibus (hardcover, 632 pages, February 2012, ISBN 0-7851-5990-8)

== See also ==
- List of comics based on fiction
- Star Wars (1977 comic book)
