= Ellekappa =

Italian cartoonist (born 1955)

- Born: Laura Pellegrini; 12 November 1955 (age 71); Rome, Italy
- Occupation: Cartoonist

Laura Pellegrini (born 12 November 1955), best known as Ellekappa, is an Italian editorial cartoonist, comic artist and illustrator.

== Life and career ==
Born in Rome, Pellegrini graduated from a fashion school for stylists before being employed as a clerk in a ministerial office. First close to anarchism and later to the Italian Communist Party, she made her comic debut in the political magazine Città futura. Since then she collaborated with numerous high-profile newspapers and magazines, notably Corriere della Sera, La Repubblica, L'Unità, Il manifesto, Il Male, Linus, Cuore, Tango, Noi donne. She also served as a collaborating writer in several satirical shows, notably Striscia la notizia and Drive In.

The main subjects of Ellekappa's generally black-and-white cartoons are two people, often women, discussing the daily events in a harsh and bitter tone, in a dialog generally consisting of just two lines. In 2007, she was awarded the Flaiano Prize for satire.
