= Demon in a Bottle =

Iron Man story arc

- The Invincible Iron Man #128 (November 1979); Cover art by Bob Layton
- Publisher: Marvel Comics
- Publication date: March – November 1979
- Genre: Superhero
- Title(s): The Invincible Iron Man #120–128 (March–Nov. 1979)
- Main character: Iron Man

Creative team
- Writer(s): David Michelinie; Bob Layton
- Penciller(s): John Romita, Jr. Bob Layton; Carmine Infantino
- Inker: Bob Layton
- Letterer: John Costanza
- Colorist(s): Ben Sean; Carl Gafford
- Editor: Roger Stern
- Softcover: ISBN 0-7851-2043-2
- Hardcover: ISBN 0-7851-3095-0

"Demon in a Bottle" is a nine-issue story arc from the comic book series The Invincible Iron Man (vol. 1), published in issues 120 through 128 in 1979 by Marvel Comics. It was written by David Michelinie and Bob Layton and illustrated by John Romita, Jr., Bob Layton, and Carmine Infantino. "Demon in a Bottle" centers on Tony Stark's alcoholism, which worsens just as a dangerous new villain threatens to destroy him and his company.

== Publication history ==
The storyline ran in Iron Man #120–128 (March–Nov. 1979), plotted by David Michelinie and Bob Layton, with script by Michelinie. John Romita, Jr. pencilled the breakdown sketches, with Layton providing finished art. Issue #122 (May 1979) was both plotted and scripted by Michelinie, penciled by Carmine Infantino and inked by Layton.

"Demon in a Bottle" was originally only the title of the final issue in the storyline. When the storyline was collected in trade paperback in 1984 and 1989, it was published under the title The Power of Iron Man. "Demon in a Bottle" later became the popular name for the storyline, and collected editions were then published under that title.

== Plot summary ==
A military tank hurled through the air strikes the wing of a passenger plane carrying Tony Stark. Stark secretly dons the Iron Man armor he carries in his briefcase, flies out of the plane, and guides it to a safe landing in the ocean. Navy ships approach and soldiers help the passengers to safety and bring Iron Man to an island base. They tell him the tank was thrown by Namor, who was defending a resident of the island that the soldiers were trying to remove because the island is used as a toxic waste disposal site. Iron Man confronts and fights Namor before it's revealed that the soldiers belong to the Roxxon Oil Corporation, which is secretly occupying the island to mine the vibranium it contains. Iron Man and Namor team up to fight and defeat the soldiers, who escape and trigger explosives contained on the island, destroying it along with any evidence that they were ever there.

While flying home, Iron Man's armor begins to malfunction, sending him flying uncontrollably through the sky and crash-landing. He regains control and later tests the armor in his lab and finds nothing wrong. Stark is visiting a casino with Bethany Cabe when Blizzard, the Melter, and Whiplash arrive and attempt to rob the casino's vault. Stark slips away, dons his armor, and battles and defeats the villains. During the fight, he overhears a comment from Blizzard about "Hammer" wanting Iron Man kept alive. Stark later receives and agrees to a request for Iron Man to represent his company, Stark International, at a public ceremony and meet with a foreign ambassador. At the ceremony, Iron Man's armor again malfunctions, striking the ambassador with a repulsor blast, killing him. Iron Man tells the police about the malfunction, claiming he did not intentionally kill the ambassador. Doubtful, but knowing they can't fight him, the police let him go but demand that Stark turn over his armor for inspection, and Stark complies. During this time, Stark's drinking increases significantly.

Stark meets with the Avengers, agreeing to their request that Iron Man temporarily step down as their leader, and asks for and receives hand-to-hand fight training from Captain America. He then meets with Scott Lang, the second Ant-Man, and asks him to sneak into the prison where Whiplash is being held to get information on the person named Hammer. Stark uses the information and flies to Monaco with James Rhodes to investigate. Hammer is alerted to their presence and sends soldiers to attack them. They are both knocked unconscious; Stark is taken prisoner, and Rhodes is left in public and arrested by the local police when he awakens. When Stark awakens, he is confronted by Justin Hammer, who reveals that he has been responsible for Iron Man's armor malfunctions. Angered that he lost a lucrative bid to Stark International, Hammer, with the aid of scientists in his employ, took control of Iron Man's armor and forced him to kill the ambassador in an attempt to ruin the reputation of the company. Stark attempts to escape Hammer's compound by climbing over a wall, but sees that he is on a giant floating island at sea.

Hammer learns of Stark's escape and orders the supervillains he keeps in his employ to find him. The supervillains find Stark, who has found the confiscated briefcase containing his spare armor and suited up. Iron Man battles and defeats the villains, then goes after Hammer. Rhodes has convinced the police of his story, and the island is attacked by police helicopters. Hammer escapes, and Iron Man flies into the air and crashes down, damaging the island and causing it to sink. Stark returns home to continue binge drinking, and drunkenly yells at his butler, Edwin Jarvis. Jarvis resigns the next day.

Continuing to drink to forget his problems, Stark is confronted by Bethany Cabe, who tells him about her former husband, Alex, who became addicted to drugs to deal with his stress and insecurities, which ended their relationship and eventually killed him. Cabe admits that she was younger and did not try to understand his insecurities, but now she has grown and will not abandon Stark like she abandoned Alex. She tells Stark that he is becoming his own worst enemy, and he must open up to and let his friends help him; otherwise, he'll keep drinking and drinking until it kills him. Stark admits to his drinking problem and accepts Cabe's offer to help him quit drinking and help him through withdrawal. Stark then apologizes to and renews his working relationship with Jarvis. He learns that Jarvis's mother is sick and offers to pay for her medical costs but learns that Jarvis has sold the two shares of stock he owned in Stark International that were preventing S.H.I.E.L.D. from buying a controlling interest in his company. The story ends with Stark optimistic about the future, conquering his alcoholism, and determined to retrieve the stocks and maintain control over his company.

== Creation ==
Writer/artist Bob Layton said of the story: "I'm gonna quote David Michelinie here, that it was never our intention to do anything relevant. We were paid to, basically, do the next episode of Iron Man. [It's] just [that in] that particular issue, alcoholism was the bad guy. Instead of Doctor Doom or somebody like that, it was the bottle. That was our villain of the month. And that's really the way we treated it. We built everything up to that. But the point of it is, it was never... we never attempted to be relevant. It just... in the corporate world, what gets to guys? What causes the downfall? Usually it's greed, or it's sex and drugs, right? Well, we couldn't do the sex part, right? Alcohol wasn't talked about all that much, really, to be honest with you. Especially with kids, you know, in that particular era. But, you know, we treated it as we intended to, as the bad guy."

== Reception and legacy ==
"Demon in a Bottle" has been recognized by critics as "the quintessential Iron Man story," "one of the best super-hero sagas of the 1970s," and "one which continues to influence writers of the character today." The storyline won a 1980 Eagle Award for "Favorite Single Comic Book Story." Praising Michelinie's "clever" writing and Romita and Layton's "highly distinguishable" artwork, J. Montes of the Weekly Comic Book Review said, "Iron Man was never known for having engaging stories, but in this one rare case it happened and that is why we treasure it." Montes felt it was "a bit silly to see [Stark] recover from [the effects of his alcoholism] over the course of one issue," but added that "there's no mistaking the losses and struggles he deals with."

D.K. Latta of Pulp and Dagger praised Michelinie for "deliver[ing] smart writing and plausible, grown up characters that are a pleasure to read and a rich tapestry of plot threads" and "avoid[ing] the preachy, holier-than-thou route, and instead just tell[ing] a story that happens to concern a costumed super-hero getting a little...lost." Latta found Romita's pencil art "problematic" but added that "Bob Layton's inks help a lot." Win Wiacek of Now Read This! said, "The fall and rise of a hero is a classic plot, and it's seldom been better used in the graphic narrative medium and never bettered in the super-hero field. An adult and very mature tale for kids of all ages, it is an unforgettable instance of triumph and tragedy perfectly told."

Jamie Hailstone of Den of Geek said that "some of the storytelling and the portrayal of Tony Stark as a millionaire playboy may be a little hackneyed," but praised the storyline for "[giving] the character a much needed injection of reality." Hailstone said Romita's artwork is "as good as anything in his long career," and concluded that "while it might not deal with the consequences of addiction in the same powerful ways as films like French Connection II—this is a comic, after all—having re-read the tale almost 20 years on, it holds up amazingly well." Dave Wallace of the Comics Bulletin said the issues "are too generic and unremarkable to really stand up as great stories today," but said that "each issue is a satisfying story in its own right" and praised "the strong storytelling instincts that are evident from the composition of [Romita's] panels." Stark's alcoholism was revisited in later storylines, and remains a defining element of the character.

== In other media ==
=== Films ===
Jon Favreau, director of the 2008 Iron Man film, said: "Stark has issues with booze. That's part of who he is." Favreau said that elements of the story would be used in future Iron Man sequels: "I don't think we'll ever do the Leaving Las Vegas version, but it will be dealt with." In Iron Man 2, Favreau notes that the scene of Tony drunkenly carousing during a party in his armor at his residence until Col. James Rhodes intervenes is the closest he intended to adapt the "Demon in a Bottle" storyline.

== Collected editions ==
Collected editions include a trade paperback published in May 2006 (ISBN 0-7851-2043-2) and a Marvel Premiere Classics hardcover in 2008 (ISBN 0-7851-3095-0). It was published as part of The Official Marvel Graphic Novel Collection.
