= Girighiz =

Comic strip by Enzo Lunari

Girighiz is an Italian comic strip created by Enzo Lunari.

== Background ==
Girighiz first appeared in August 1965, in the comic magazine Linus.

Set in the prehistoric age, the cartoon strip, unlike Johnny Hart's similar BC, is openly political and satirical.
