= Claudio Petruccioli =

Italian politician and journalist

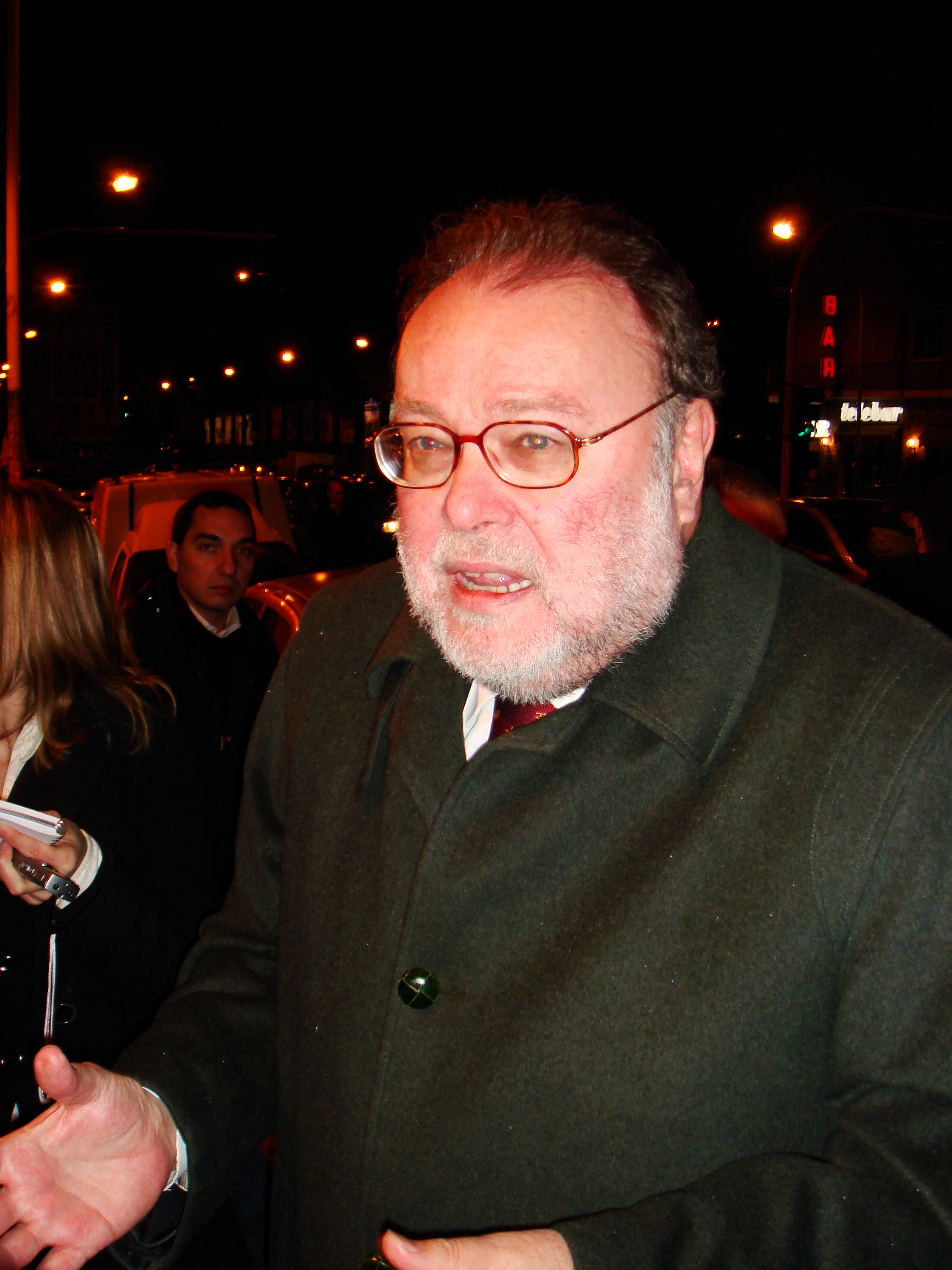
Claudio Petruccioli.

Claudio Petruccioli (born 22 March 1941) is an Italian politician and journalist. A member of the Italian Communist Party (Partito Comunista Italiano, or PCI) until 1991, he has been president of Italian state-owned network, RAI, from 2005 to 2009.

== Biography ==
Petruccioli was born in Terni, Umbria, but lived at Foligno until 1958, when he moved to Rome where he studied philosophy but without graduating. In 1959 he entered the Italian Communist Party and, in 1962, he became a member of the Italian Communist Youth Federation. Petruccioli was the latter's national secretary from 1966 to 1969. In that year, he became regional secretary for the PCI in Abruzzo, and was a member of the city council of Pescara, in the same region, in 1970. In 1971 he moved to Milan.

A journalist by profession, he was appointed co-director of the PCI's official newspaper, L'Unità, in 1975, becoming its director in 1981–1982. In 1976–1980 Petruccioli was also member of the Milanese La Scala theater's directing council. In 1983 Petruccioli was elected to the Italian Chamber of Deputies for the PCI, and, after being re-elected in 1987, he entered the PCI's national secretariat.

Petruccioli was elected again to the Italian parliament in 1992, this time for the PCI's successor, the Democratic Party of the Left (PDS). In 1994 he was elected for the same party, this time to the Italian Senate, where he stayed until 1996. In 2005 he became president of Italian state-owned television, RAI. He ended his mandate in 2009, after refusing a resignation request in 2007.

Petruccioli in 2001 published his memories, entitled Rendi conto, dealing with the first ten years of the PDS and its followers, the Democrats of the Left (DS).

== Sources ==
- Telese, Luca (2009). Qualcuno era comunista. Sperling & Kupfer.
