= Enzo Lunari =

Italian comics artist

- Born: 2 January 1937 (age 88); Milan, Italy
- Occupation: Cartoonist

Enzo Lunari (born 2 January 1937) is an Italian comics artist, editorial cartoonist, and illustrator.

== Life and career ==
Born in Milan, the brother of the playwright Luigi, Lunari graduated in political and social science, and then worked as editorial writer at the Mursia publishing house. He made his professional debut with the comic strip Girighiz, first published in the comic magazine Linus in 1965. In 1966 he created Fra' Salmastro, a comic series set in the Middle Ages. In the 1970s he created Geodesio, a satirical comic strip which featured Italian politicians.

Among Lunari's best known works there is I vecchietti, a comic strip featuring elderly people; the main character Eritreo Cazzulati was featured in the animated opening of the television comedy show Mai dire Gol and in numerous gadget items and merchandising products. Lunari collaborated as editorial cartoonist, comics artist, and illustrator with a variety of publications, notably Corriere della Sera, La Stampa, Il Sole 24 ore, Panorama, L'Europeo, Cuore, and Tango.
