= Vincino =

Italian cartoonist (1946–2018)

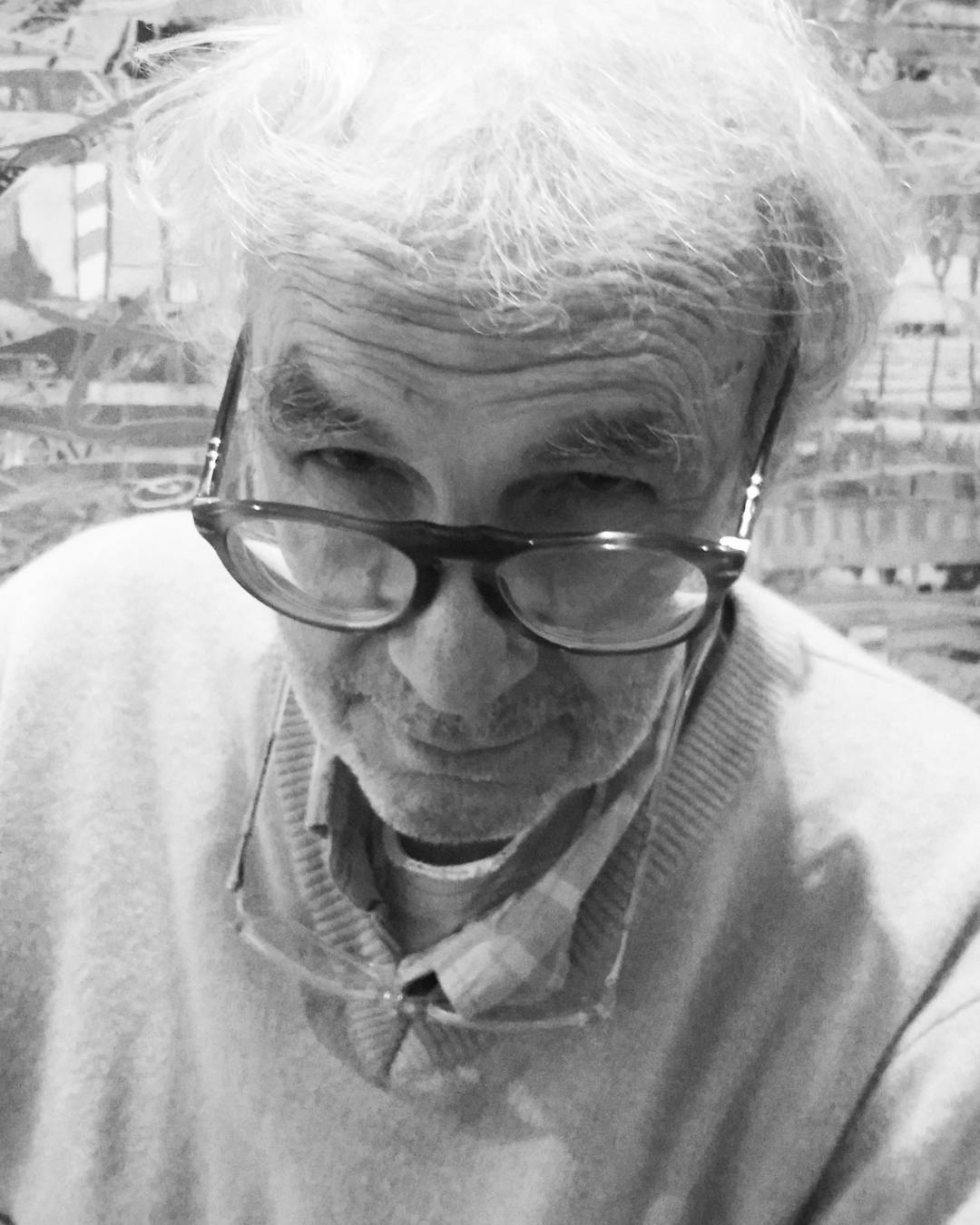
- Born: 30 May 1946; Palermo, Italy
- Died: 21 August 2018 (aged 72); Rome, Italy

Vincenzo Gallo (30 May 1946 – 21 August 2018), best known as Vincino, was an Italian editorial cartoonist and illustrator.

== Life and career ==
Born in Palermo, after graduating in architecture at the Palermo University Vincino made his professional debut in the newspaper L'Ora. After moving to Rome to collaborate with the newspaper Lotta continua, he was among the founding members of the satirical magazine Il Male, which he also directed for four years. In the 1980s he collaborated with numerous publications, including Corriere della Sera, Tango, Cuore, and founded the L'Espresso satirical insert Il Clandestino.

In 1995, he started a long collaboration with Il Foglio, where he worked until his death. In his later years he also collaborated with Radio Radicale and Vanity Fair. His inspirations were Jean-Marc Reiser and L'Asino.
