= Alfredo Chiappori =

Italian satirical cartoonist and writer (1943–2022)

- Born: 27 August 1943; Lecco, Italy
- Died: 14 October 2022 (aged 79)
- Occupations: Cartoonist, writer

Alfredo Chiappori (27 August 1943 – 14 October 2022) was an Italian satirical cartoonist, comic artist and writer.

Born in Lecco, Chiappori enrolled at the National Institute of Art graduating in 1965. After dedicating himself to painting for a few years, in 1967 he started teaching art and drawing at the Liceo scientifico in his hometown. He made his professional debut in 1968 with Up il sovversivo ("Up the subversive"), a comic strip series inspired by the 1968 student protests and published in the magazine Linus. Chiappori also drew a comic series about the history of Italy, titled Storie d'Italia.

After releasing several books with the publisher Feltrinelli, in 1975 Chiappori started a long collaboration as a cartoonist with the magazine Panorama. His collaborations also include the newspaper Corriere della Sera and the magazines Ca Balà and Fabbrica e stato. He also designed a few album covers.
