= Cuore (zine) =

Italian satirical magazine

- Cuore's first issue
- Type: Weekly
- Editor: Michele Serra; Claudio Sabelli Fioretti; Andrea Aloi
- Founded: 16 January 1989
- Political alignment: Satire
- Ceased publication: 1997
- Circulation: Maximum of 160,000

Cuore: human resistance weekly was a satirical insert of the Italian Communist newspaper l'Unità.

== History ==
Cuore was first published on 16 January 1989 issue of l'Unità, three months after its predecessor Tango, another satirical insert edited by Sergio Staino, disappeared.

Its founders were Michele Serra, who remained an editor until June 1994 and had earlier been a sports and culture reporter for l'Unità, the managing editor of the culture pages, Andrea Aloi, and journalist Piergiorgio Paterlini. They also had the old managing editor of l'Unità, Sergio Banali.

Among the many contributors were Sergio Staino, Vauro, Vincino, Altan, Ellekappa, Roberto Perini, Disegni and Caviglia, Gialappa's Band, Beppe Grillo, Stefano Benni, Domenico Starnone, Gino and Michele, Enzo Costa, Majid Valcarenghi, Daria Bignardi, Fabio Fazio, and Patrizio Roversi. The graphic design was curated by Mauro Luccarini and Fabio Bolognini.

The last edition of Cuore to appear in l'Unità was number 104, 21 January 1991. Soon thereafter, around the same time as the Italian Communist Party was dissolved, Cuore became an independent weekly on 4 February 1991, and to everyone's surprise, began to sell 140,000 copies a week. The magazine was closed down in 1997.

The magazine's parties became an important meeting place for the Left, these were usually held in July, at an estate in Montecchio, Reggio Emilia. It would remain so until the eleventh

== See also ==
- List of magazines in Italy
