= Cavalli si nasce =

- Directed by: Sergio Staino
- Written by: Sergio Staino
- Starring: Paolo Hendel; David Riondino; Pietra Montecorvino; Vincent Gardenia
- Cinematography: Camillo Bazzoni
- Edited by: Nino Baragli
- Music by: Carlo D'Angiò; Eugenio Bennato
- Release date: 1989
- Running time: 102 minutes
- Language: Italian

Cavalli si nasce is a 1989 Italian comedy film written and directed by cartoonist Sergio Staino, in his film debut. The film won the Silver Ribbon for Best Score.

== Cast ==
- Paolo Hendel as Paolo
- David Riondino as Ottavio
- Pietra Montecorvino as Carola
- Vincent Gardenia as the Neapolitan Prince
- Delia Boccardo as the Baroness
- Giacomo Marramao as Father Giacomo
- Franco Angrisano as the housekeeper
- Beniamino Placido as Gaetano
- Riccardo Pangallo as Alfonso
- Roberto Murolo as the conductor
- Bonvi as the Borbonic soldier
