= Pino Zac =

Italian illustrator, cartoonist and animator

- Born: Giuseppe Zaccaria; 23 April 1930; Trapani, Italy
- Died: 25 August 1985 (aged 55); Fontecchio, Italy
- Occupations: Illustrator; Cartoonist

Giuseppe Zaccaria (23 April 1930 – 25 August 1985), best known as Pino Zac, was an Italian illustrator, cartoonist and animator.

== Biography ==
Born in Trapani, Sicily, Zac spent his childhood in Pratola Peligna, Abruzzo and eventually moved to Rome to study architecture. In 1951 he started his professional debut with the comic strip Gatto Filippo, published in the newspaper Paese Sera until 1959. He later collaborated with a large number of European publications, including the Italian magazines Eureka and Pioniere, the French magazines L'Écho des savanes and Le Canard enchaîné, the British magazine Playtime, the Polish magazine Spillky. In 1977 he co-founded the satirical magazine Il Male, of which he also realized several covers.

Zac was also active as a director and screenwriter of animation films. He realized about 20 short films and the experimental feature film The Nonexistent Knight, based on the novel with the same name by Italo Calvino. Zac died of a heart attack in his house in 1985.

In 2015, a documentary film about Zac, Zac - I fiori del Male by Massimo Denaro, was screened out of competition at the 72nd edition of the Venice Film Festival.

== Controversies ==
Zac's profane, irreverent, sometimes brutal satire caused him several complaints and legal problems. Among his favorite targets, Zac's often focused on clergymen's corruption and sexual repression. Among his works, he realized four books targeting the Catholic Church and the petty-bourgeois Italian mentality. In 2002, Nobel Prize-winner Dario Fo remembered him as "the first cartoonist in the world to draw the Pope without clothes".

== Bibliography ==
- Pino Zac, Les dessous du Vatican, Paris, Satirix, Nr 17, February 1973.
- Pino Zac, La Vérité toute nue, Paris, Satirix, Nr 23, September 1973.
