= Paese Sera =

Italian afternoon newspaper founded in 1949

Historic logo, a red circle

Paese Sera was an Italian afternoon newspaper published between 1949 and 1994.

== History ==
The newspaper was founded in Rome in 1949, as the afternoon edition of the newspaper Il Paese. Close to the Italian Communist Party, it was intended as a left-wing alternative to the popular center-right Roman newspapers Il Messaggero and Il Tempo. Differently from the official organ of the party, L'Unità, Paese Sera gave ample room to more light and popular themes such as gossip news, crime reports, comic strips and horoscopes. The first editor was Tomaso Smith, who resigned in 1956, opposing the choice of the Italian Communist Party of supporting the Soviet invasion of Hungary. Among its collaborators were Umberto Eco, Gianni Rodari, Norberto Bobbio, Maurizio Costanzo, Edoardo Sanguineti, Tullio De Mauro, Natalino Sapegno, Arrigo Benedetti, Andrea Barbato, Elio Pagliarani, Aldo Biscardi, Bonvi, Massimo Mattioli and Pino Zac. In 1963, with the closure of Il Paese, it replaced it with a morning edition.

Following increasing competition, the disinterest of the Communist Party, and a significant drop in sales, the newspaper first closed in 1983. Thanks to the creation of a cooperative formed by its employees and to a readers' subscription the newspaper reprised its publications shortly later, before closing again in 1994.

A few short-lived attempts to relaunch it were attempted in the following years.
