= Linus (magazine) =

Italian comics magazine

The first issue of linus, April 1965

linus is an Italian comics magazine published in Italy since 1965. It is the first Italian magazine exclusively focused on comics. Since 1993, it has been continuously published by Baldini & Castoldi. Previous publishers include Milano Libri (1965–1972) and Rizzoli (1972–1993).

== History and profile ==
The first number of linus was published in April 1965 by Milano Libri, a subsidiary of Rizzoli after 1972; since 1993, it has been continuously published by Baldini & Castoldi in monthly issues. Its founder was Giovanni Gandini. The magazine's name was always written in lowercase letters. It had a sister magazine, Alter, which was also a comics magazine. Both magazines had a leftist cultural stance and their editorials supported for the Italian Communist Party.

The first director of linus was Giovanni Gandini. The magazine published foreign comic strips like Peanuts, Li'l Abner, Bristow, Dick Tracy, and others. linus was also the place where Italian comics found space for the first time: examples include Neutron/Valentina by Guido Crepax and Girighiz by Enzo Lunari. It was the first Italian comics magazine which featured stories read by adults.

From the magazine's beginning, the comics section was accompanied by an extensive section dealing with society, politics, mass media, literature and other cultural themes. The first issue, for example, featured an interview by Umberto Eco with the novelist Elio Vittorini. Satirical strips by famous Italian authors like Altan, Alfredo Chiappori, Sergio Staino, Ellekappa, Angese, Vauro, Bruno D'Alfonso and by foreigners like Jules Feiffer were regularly published. Gandini was followed in 1972 by the intellectual, journalist, and writer Oreste del Buono.

Adventures comic book series like Dick Tracy or Jeff Hawke were initially published separately on special issues. These later were moved into a monthly series, Alterlinus (later Alter Alter and simply Alter, 1974), where more adult-themed comics found place, including works by innovative French authors like Moebius, Enki Bilal or Philippe Druillet and Italian artists like Sergio Toppi, Andrea Pazienza and Lorenzo Mattotti. Pure adventure themes were published in the monthly spin-off magazine Corto Maltese, created in 1983, named after Hugo Pratt's famous character.

Enzo Baldoni, the Italian journalist and writer killed in Iraq in 2004, worked as translator for linus, notably for the Doonesbury comic strip. Garry Trudeau wrote about him in his website shortly after Baldoni's murder.

A few issues of an English language edition were produced in 1970, edited by Frank Dickens and Ralph Steadman.

== Comic strips published in linus ==
- Asterix
- B.C.
- Barbarella
- Bristow
- Calvin & Hobbes
- Corto Maltese
- Crock
- Dick Tracy
- Dilbert
- Doonesbury
- Fearless Fosdick
- Get Fuzzy
- Girighiz
- Krazy Kat
- Li'l Abner
- Maakies
- Maus
- Peanuts
- Pogo
- Robotman
- Valentina
- The Wizard of Id

== See also ==
- List of magazines published in Italy
