= Sergio Staino =

Italian artist and film director (1940–2023)

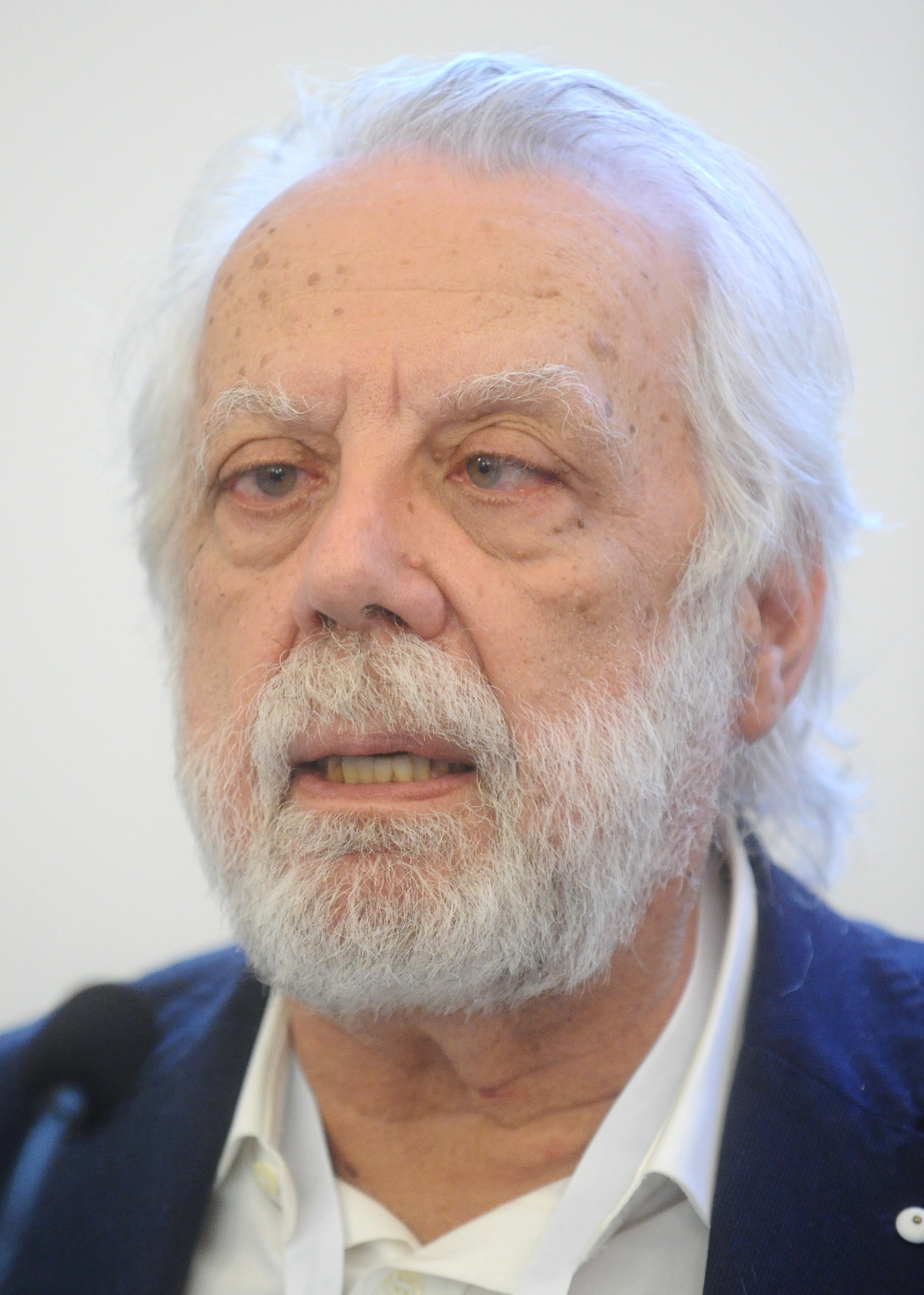
- Staino in 2016
- Born: June 8, 1940 Piancastagnaio, province of Siena, Italy
- Died: October 21, 2023 (aged 83) Lazio, Italy
- Areas: Comics author, satirist, and film director
- Awards: U Giancu's Prize (2004)

Sergio Staino (8 June 1940 – 21 October 2023) was an Italian comics author, satirist, and film director.

== Biography ==
Staino was born in Piancastagnaio, in the province of Siena. After graduating with a degree in architecture, he moved to Scandicci. His comics debut was with Bobo, an autobiographical character, published in the magazine Linus starting in 1979.

In the 1980s he began collaborating with the newspapers Il Messaggero and L'Unità. In 1986 he founded the satirical magazine Tango. From 1987 to 1993 he directed satirical TV shows for Rai 3, such as Teletango and Cielito Lindo; in this period he also directed two movies, Cavalli si nasce (1989) and Non chiamarmi Omar (1992).

In 2016 he published his autobiography, Io sono Bobo (Della Porta), written with journalists Fabio Galati and Laura Montanari. On 8 September 2016 he became the new editor of L'Unità.

Long sick and almost blind for over two years, Staino died on 21 October 2023, at the age of 83. He was a member of the Union of Rationalist Atheists and Agnostics.
