= L'Unità =

Italian leftist daily newspaper

l'Unità
- Fondata da Antonio Gramsci ("Founded by Antonio Gramsci")

- Front page, 5 March 2009
- Type: Daily newspaper
- Format: Berliner
- Owner: Romeo editore srl
- Editor: Piero Sansonetti
- Founded: 12 February 1924
- Political alignment: Communism (1924–1991); Social democracy (1991–currently); Democratic socialism (2023-currently); Left-libertarianism (2023–currently); Social liberalism (2015–2017); Parties: PCI (1924–1991); PDS (1991–1998); DS (1998–2007); PD (2007–2017)
- Headquarters: Via di Pallacorda 7, Rome, Italy
- Circulation: 20,937 (April 2014)
- ISSN: 0391-7002
- Website: unita.it

The header of the first issue of Cuore

l'Unità (Italian: [luniˈta]; English: "the Unity") is an Italian newspaper, founded as the official newspaper of the Italian Communist Party (PCI) in 1924. It was supportive of that party's successor parties, the Democratic Party of the Left, Democrats of the Left, and, from October 2007 until 2017, the Democratic Party.

The newspaper closed on 31 July 2014. It was restarted on 30 June 2015, but it ceased again on 3 June 2017. On 16 May 2023, it was relaunched for a third time as an independent publication under the editorship of Piero Sansonetti.

== History and profile ==
l'Unità was founded by Antonio Gramsci on 12 February 1924 as the "newspaper of workers and peasants", the official newspaper of the Italian Communist Party (PCI). The paper was printed in Milan with a circulation of 20,000 to 30,000. On 8 November 1925, publications were blocked by the city's prefect together with Avanti!, the newspaper of the Italian Socialist Party (PSI). After an assassination attempt on Benito Mussolini (31 October 1926), its publication was completely suppressed. A clandestine edition was resumed on the first day of 1927 with irregular circulation in Milan, Turin, Rome and in France. Full publication was resumed after the Allied conquest of Rome on 6 June 1944, the new editor-in-chief being Celeste Negarville.

After the liberation from the German occupation in 1945, new local editions began in Milan, Genoa and Turin, the latter edited by philosopher Ludovico Geymonat. Elio Vittorini became the editor-in-chief of l'Unità during this period. The newspaper's contributors included Davide Layolo, Luigi Cavallo, Ada Gobetti, Cesare Pavese, Italo Calvino, Alfonso Gatto, Aldo Tortorella and Paolo Spriano. In the same year, the festa de l'Unità was launched in most Italian cities. In 1957, the Genoese, Milanese and Torinese editions were merged into a single edition for northern Italy.

The newspaper's editorships were unified in 1962 under Mario Alicata, who was succeeded by Maurizio Ferrara in 1966. In 1974, daily circulation of l'Unità amounted to 239,000 copies, but in the early 1980s this number was to fall substantially, mostly due to competition from the new left-oriented la Repubblica: the 100 million copies sold in 1981 decreased by two-fifths in just one year alone, to 60 million in 1982. It was also in 1982 that a document was published by the newspaper which accused the Christian Democratic minister Vincenzo Scotti of collaborating with the Camorra leader Raffaele Cutolo, a claim that was subsequently proved to be false. The editor-in-chief Claudio Petruccioli resigned and was replaced by Emanuele Macaluso. Massimo D'Alema, the future Prime Minister of Italy, was managing-director until July 1990.

From 1989 to 1990, the newspaper was accompanied by the satirical weekly magazine Cuore, directed by Michele Serra. In 1991, the title changed from Journal of the Italian Communist Party to Journal founded by Antonio Gramsci. From 1992 to 1996, its director was Walter Veltroni, who started periodically providing free gifts, such as books and videocassettes, with copies of the newspaper.

The newspaper ceased publication for eight months from 28 July 2000 to 28 March 2001 because of financial problems. Following this uncertain period, it was published by Baldini & Castoldi, a company not linked to the Democrats of the Left (DS) or Democratic Party (PD); however, its political position continued to be strongly tied to the DS and PD.

In May 2008, Tiscali founder and Sardinia president Renato Soru finalized a deal to become the new newspaper owner. One of the first moves made by the new property was the appointment of former la Repubblica journalist Concita De Gregorio as new editor-in-chief in August 2008, replacing Antonio Padellaro in the post. In June 2009, Maurizio Mian's Gunther Reform Holding invested €3m to acquire a 20% stake in l'Unità, still under the ownership of Soru. On 7 May 2012, the paper began to be published in Berliner format.

l'Unita again suspended publication on 31 July 2014. A meeting of shareholders was unable to decide how to keep the newspaper financially viable as debts amounted to €30 million.

On 30 June 2015, l'Unità resumed its publications, under the new editor Erasmo d'Angelis and with a renewed graphic style; the new owner was Stefano Pessina, a major Italian building businessmen, while a minority share was owned by the Democratic Party. The newly relaunched paper soon found itself in financial crisis again, with a net loss of 250,000 euros per month and only 8,000 copies sold (out of the 60,000 printed). In an attempt to improve the situation, the owners dismissed D'Angelis and appointed Sergio Staino (a cartoonist who had longed worked for the paper) as new editor; this proved ineffective and on 3 June 2017 l'Unità ceased publications for the third time.

From 2018 to 2022, l'Unità published only one number a year, in order to avoid losing its publication license.

On 27 July 2022, the publishing company of l'Unità declared bankruptcy and the paper was put for sale in public auctions.

On 22 November 2022, the Romeo Editore srl group (which had recently acquired and relaunched Il Riformista) bought l'Unità with an offer of 910,000 euros. Piero Sansonetti was subsequently appointed editor and the newspaper resumed publications on 16 May 2023.

== Circulation ==
The 1988 circulation of l'Unita was 300,000 copies. In 1991, the paper had a circulation of circa 156,000 copies, but next year its circulation was 124,000 copies. In 1997, it was the tenth best-selling Italian newspaper with a circulation of 82,078 copies. The circulation of the paper was 49,536 copies in 2008 and 53,221 copies in 2009. It fell to 44,450 copies in 2010. In April 2014, the paper had a circulation of 20,937 copies. In 2016, circulation had fallen to 8,000 copies and further declined to 7,000 copies in 2017.

== Editors-in-chief ==
- Ottavio Pastore (1924)
- Alfonso Leonetti (1924–1925)
- Mario Malatesta (1925)
- Riccardo Ravagnan (1925–1926)
- Girolamo Li Causi (1926)
- Eugenio Curiel (1943–1944)
- Celeste Negarville (1944–1945)
- Velio Spano (1945–1946)
- Mario Montagnana (1946–1947)
- Pietro Ingrao (1947–1957)
- Alfredo Reichlin (1957–1962)
- Mario Alicata (1962–1966)
- Maurizio Ferrara (1966)
- Maurizio Ferrara & Elio Quercioli (1966–1969)
- Giancarlo Pajetta (1969–1970)
- Aldo Tortorella (1970–1975)
- Luca Pavolini (1975–1977)
- Alfredo Reichlin (1977–1981)
- Claudio Petruccioli (1981–1982)
- Emanuele Macaluso (1982–1986)
- Gerardo Chiaromonte (1986–1988)
- Massimo D'Alema (1988–1990)
- Renzo Foa (1990–1992)
- Walter Veltroni (1992–1996)
- Giuseppe Caldarola (1996–1998)
- Mino Fuccillo (1998)
- Paolo Gambescia (1998–1999)
- Giuseppe Caldarola (1999–2000)

Publications suspended from 2000 to 2001

- Furio Colombo (2001–2004)
- Antonio Padellaro (2004–2008)
- Concita De Gregorio (2008–2011)
- Claudio Sardo (2011–2013)
- Luca Landò (2013–2014)

Publications suspended from 2014 to 2015

- Erasmo D'Angelis (2015–2016)
- Sergio Staino & Andrea Romano (2016–2017)
- Sergio Staino (2017)
- Marco Bucciantini (2017)

Publications suspended from 2017 to 2023

- Piero Sansonetti (since 2023)

== See also ==
- List of newspapers in Italy
