= Il Male =

Italian satirical magazine, 1978–1982

- Categories: Satirical magazine
- Frequency: Weekly
- First issue: February 1978
- Final issue: 1982
- Country: Italy
- Based in: Rome
- Language: Italian

Il Male (Italian for "Evil") was a satirical magazine published in Rome, Italy, between 1978 and 1982.

== History and profile ==
Il Male was first published in February 1978 as a biweekly tabloid format political satire magazine. The magazine originated from Italian cartoonist Pino Zac's idea. Tommaso Chiaretti was the first editor-in-chief.

The magazine became later weekly. It started with a circulation of 20.000 copies and reached peaks of 48,000 copies. Its fake covers of prominent newspaper were sensational media pranks; the authors even distributed a fake Pravda in Russia during communist rule. The magazine also published a fake Corriere dello Sport in 1978.

Il Male ceased publication in 1982.

== See also ==
- List of magazines in Italy
