= Giampaolo Pansa =

Italian journalist and writer (1935–2020)

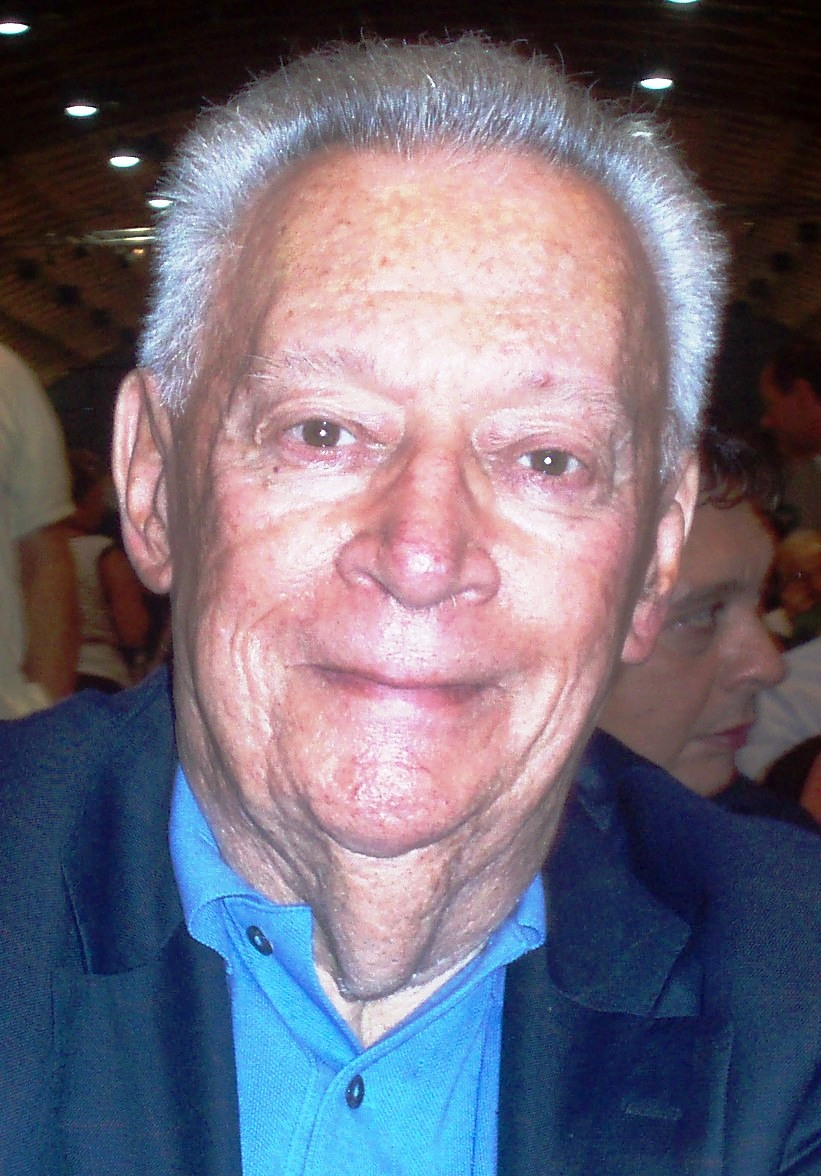
- Pansa in 2010
- Born: 1 October 1935; Casale Monferrato, Italy
- Died: 12 January 2020 (aged 84); Rome, Italy
- Education: Istituto Balbo at Casale Monferrato; University of Turin
- Occupations: Writer; Reporter; Journalist-commentator; Newspaper editor-in-chief; Essayist (History); Novelist
- Children: Alessandro Pansa 1962–2017

Giampaolo Pansa (1 October 1935 – 12 January 2020) was an Italian journalist, commentator, and novelist. Most of his writings were rooted in modern or contemporary history, notably with regard to the Italian Resistance and the years of Benito Mussolini.

== Biography ==
=== Provenance and early years ===
Giampaolo Pansa was born and raised in Casale Monferrato, Italy, an industrial town near the Po river, located in the province of Alessandria, in Piedmont. His father, Ernesto Pansa, the fifth of six children, grew up in poverty. Because Ernesto was the last child to leave home and marry, his widowed mother (Caterina Zaffiro) moved in with him. As a result, the young Giampaolo developed a close relationship with his grandmother -- who was born in 1869 in the little village of Caresana located north of the Po river.

The Pansas were farm workers, but a generation later, they transitioned to industrial work. As Giampaolo grew up, there were three career options he could take, but working in the local Marl quarries was the least appealing. Another possibility would have been a job at one of the many cement factories in the town.

The third, and as it seemed at the time "cleanest" option would have involved following his father's example and working at the Eternit asbestos plant. He attended school locally at the Istituto Balbo (secondary school), where he received a classical education, opening the way for university admission and a chance to move away.

Graduating from school with top marks and a "cum laude" commendation for his final exams, Pansa enrolled at the University of Turin, where he studied for a degree in political sciences. One of his teachers, Alessandro Galante Garrone, encouraged him to study the history of the Second World War and of the Italian Resistance.

Pansa completed his university studies on July 16, 1959 with a degree in Political Sciences, submitting a dissertation titled 'The Resistance in the Province of Alessandria (1943–1945)'. The work was supervised by Guido Quazza. An expanded version appeared as a book in 1967, titled for publication as "Guerra partigiana tra Genova e il Po" ("The Partisan War between Genoa and the Po").

The novelist's work on the wartime antifascist resistance also earned him the "Einaudi Prize", worth 500,000 lira, and brought him to the attention of the editors and owners at the prestigious Turin-based daily newspaper, La Stampa.

=== Daily newspaper journalist ===
In 1961 Giampaolo Pansa joined La Stampa and, and over the next thirty years contributed to all of Italy's' leading papers.

- 1961–1964, La Stampa: He undertook an apprenticeship under the directorship of Giulio De Benedetti, between January 1961 and June 1962. Some of his most memorable contributions during this period concerned the Vajont disaster.
- 1964–1968, Il Giorno: Working for the Milan-based paper under the directorship of Italo Pietra, Pansa reported on events in the Lombardy region.
- 1969–1972, La Stampa: Pansa then returned to La Stampa shortly after Alberto Ronchey took over as director of the newspaper, covering the Piazza Fontana bombing in Milan.
- 1972–1973, Il Messaggero: Leaving his northern home-base, he moved to Il Messaggero in Rome to serve as Editor-in-chief under the directorship of Alessandro Perrone, who during the previous five years had pioneered the application of computer graphics and other technological innovations that made Messaggero a uniquely influential newspaper-technology benchmark for Italy. Under Pansa's leadership, the paper maintained a moderate center-left editorial stance, while overseeing a major Rome-based daily during a period of increasing terrorism and anarchism, aligning closely with the country's ruling establishment. He led an editorial team that was influenced by the quarrelsome relationship between Director Perrone and his cousin Ferdinando Perrone, another major shareholder and a constant presence in the offices. Pansa's term as editor ended after Messaggero was sold to Montedison in May 1974.
- 1973–1977, Corriere della Sera: At the start of July 1973, Pansa joined Corriere della Sera in Genoa, then under the directorship of Piero Ottone, seen by commentators of the time as representative of a younger "more dynamic" generation of newspaper directors. Employed as a "special correspondent", Pansa used his time at Corriere to burnish his credentials as an investigative journalist, notably through a series of pieces produced in partnership with his friend Gaetano Scardocchia, which contributed to the uncovering of the Lockheed scandals.
- 1977–1991, la Repubblica: Pansa joined in November 1977 as a "special correspondent", and in October 1978 accepted a complementary position as the paper's deputy director. Eugenio Scalfari (co-founder, director, and editor-in-chief) and Pansa guided Repubblica through a difficult period of intensified political instability and street terrorism, from which the tabloid emerged with a growing readership which made it, in 1988, the country's top newspaper with circulation at 730,000 copies. He left in 1991 to pursue other interests, but in 2000 returned to la Repubblica as a regular contributing editor.

=== Weekly journalist-commentator ===
In parallel with his newspaper work, during the 1980s Pansa also worked regularly for several weekly news magazines.

- 1983–1984, Epoca: He created the "Quaderno italiano" (loosely, "Italian notebook") column, which was then led by Sandro Mayer.
- 1984–1987, L'Espresso: He joined in 1984 and created the well-received "Chi sale e chi scende" (loosely, "Who's on the up and who's on the down") column.
- 1987–1990, Panorama: Pansa moved to the Milan-based news magazine in 1987, raising his profile as a columnist through his "Bestiario" ("Bestiary") column. Then, as now, Panorama was produced under the aegis of the Arnoldo Mondadori Editore (publishing conglomerate), who had founded the magazine back in 1939. Since 1985, it has operated under the directorship of Claudio Rinaldi. During his time there, Giampaolo Pansa became a co-director. His "Bestiario" column further built his reputation for exposing "national malpractice", without descending into hypocrisy.
- 1991–2008, L'Espresso: He returned to L'Espresso in 1991, bringing his "Bestiario" column with him. At the same time, Giovanni Valentini moved over to la Repubblica, and Giulio Anselmi took over as the director of L'Espresso. Meanwhile, Giampaolo Pansa was installed as co-director. When Anselmi also moved back to the world of daily newspapers, Daniela Hamaui became the magazine's director, while Pansa remained in place as co-director till 2008, the year of his 73rd birthday. According to Pansa, Espresso Director Hamui reacted to his decision to "retire" by screaming throughout the day on which he told her of his decision, "Why do you go away? Why?", following through, after he had left his desk, with a series of angry telephone calls and e-mails.

=== Perspective ===
Through Pansa's career as a journalist, publications produced by the press conglomerate known today as GEDI Gruppo Editoriale predominated. He worked without any significant break between 1977 and 2008 for two of the group's most successful titles, la Repubblica and then L'Espresso. During his years at la Repubblica, his political perspective aligned with center-left parties, including the Socialist Party and other opposition parties in the Chamber of Deputies. Nevertheless, he was also critical of the Communist Party in his political investigations and commentaries. His political perspectives were also on display in a book he published under the title "La Repubblica di Barbapapà. Storia irriverente di un potere invisibile" ("The Republic of Daddy Beard. Irreverent history of an invisible power"). (Note: "Barbapapà" (loosely, "Daddy Beard") was the affectionate soubriquet applied in the editorial offices to Eugenio Scalfari, the man who created and for many years directed la Repubblica.) By the time it was published in 2014, Pansa had become critical of "Barbapapà's" approach. In his biography, Pansa presented a case for the creator of Repubblica demonstrating political bias and, on occasion, heightened self-regard; he also paid tribute to the sheer genius and total dedication to work, which he saw as among of his old boss's formidable array of qualities.

=== Career highlights ===
After the Piazza Fontana bombing, Pansa created a "counterinformation" dossier that helped identify misinformation spread by the authorities in connection with the aftermath of the bomb massacre. He refused to join in with the more virulent aspects of the campaign that ensued: he refused, for example, to be join the 757 politicians, journalists and "intellectuals" who signed the angry Open letter of June 1971, targeting (the subsequently assassinated) Police Commissioner Calabresi following the (never explained) death of the alleged bomb suspect Giuseppe Pinelli in police custody, and the associated cover-up. Pansa was also among the first of the habitually left-wing journalists to assert, in response to the terrorism of the 1970s and 1980s, that "the Red Brigades were red" – left-wing killers instead of not fascist revivalists trying discredit the political left. Pansa's early and persistent rejection of this theory discredited him in the eyes of many "progressive intellectuals". His investigations of the Red Brigades led to him being targeted, along with his friend and colleague Walter Tobagi. As matters turned out, however, it was Tobagi rather than Pansa that was gunned down on a Milan street.

Pansa also became known as a creator of neologisms and sarcastic "definitions", frequently untranslatable and involving politics. He cast Fausto Bertinotti as "il parolaio rosso" (loosely, the "Red Word") while he identified Italy's Christian Democratic Party as the "White Whale", a literary allusion referencing the party's ability to survive a thousand battles. He described the irrepressible loyalists surrounding the politician Clemente Mastella as "truppe mastellate" ("mastellated troops"), in a conscious echo of the term "truppe cammellate" ("camel-mounted troops"). The Communist Party was the "red elephant" while the right-wing politician Arnaldo Forlani was "the were rabbit". In 1980 he published as article in la Repubblica under the headline "Il giornalista dimezzato" (loosely, "journalism trashed"), in which he castigated what he perceived as the hypocritical conduct of colleagues, who, in his words, "surrendered half of their own professionalism to the party". (Note: "... cedeva[no] metà della propria professionalità al partito, all'ideologia che gli era cara e che voleva[no] comunque servire anche facendo il [proprio] mestiere.")

=== Retirement from L'Espresso and later work ===
Reports of Pansa's retirement from L'Espresso on 30 September 2008 tended to explain it not by pointing out that the move came the day before his seventy-third birthday, but by quoting his justification that he found himself opposed to the magazine's editorial line. While Giampaolo Pansa focused primarily on publishing novels and historical essays during his final twelve years, he still contributed to political magazines and newspapers, including the following:

- 2008–2010, Il Riformista, Rome
- 2009–2016, Libero, Milan: here he took the opportunity, in 2011, to reintroduce his "Bestiario" column.
- 2016–2018, La Verità, Milan
- 2018–2019, Panorama, Milan
- 2019–2020, The Post Internazionale, Rome (online)

He later attributed his decision to leave La Verità in 2018 to what he saw as the paper's "Northern League" drift, while insisting that he had himself always enjoyed complete freedom from the editor to write what he wished. (Note: "Non mi piaceva questa deriva leghista. Anzi, più che leghista direi proprio salviniana".)

=== Novels and historical essays ===
The focus to which Pansa would return most frequently in his books and essays was on the wartime resistance, which he had studied for his university degree.

In "Le notti dei fuochi" ("Nights of fire"), published in 2001, Pansa explored the critical period between 1919 and 1922, covering the birth of the Squadrismo movement, Mussolini's March on Rome, and the inauguration of Fascism. He followed, in 2002, with "I figli dell'Aquila" ("Children of the eagle"), the story of a volunteer soldier in the army of the so-called "Italian Social Republic ("Repubblica Sociale Italiana"). (Note: The "Italian Social Republic" was a German puppet state with limited recognition, created in central and northern Italy, and existing under German occupation between September 1943 and May 1945.) Then came the "Blood of the vanquished" cycle, a short series of books on the violence committed by partisans against fascists during and after the war. Despite appearing more than half a century after the events described, there was an element of uneasy shock discernible beneath even in the positive critical reaction which came primarily from representatives of mainstream intellectual centre-left. (Note: Titles in the "Blood of the vanquished" cycle, which appeared between 2003 and 2010, include "Blood of the vanquished", "Sconosciuto 1945" (loosely, "Unknown 1945"), "The Big Lie" and "The losers never forget".) Pansa had turned for his sources to authorities such as Giorgio Pisanò as Antonio Serena: there were also many personal stories from those who might be identified, in terms of the series title, as the "vanquished". Pansa's historiographical approach with the six volume cycle was in aggregate unconventional, described by one source as a mixture of "historical novel", serious "Feuilleton commentary" and political polemic. Its overall style and structure were more recently analyzed in some depth by Nicola Gallerano. In 2011 the publication of "Poco o niente. Eravamo poveri. Torneremo poveri" ("Little or nothing. We were poor. We will always be poor") marked an abrupt change. The book was a portrait of the poor in northern Italy at the cusp of the nineteenth and twentieth centuries. It was the story of Pansa's grandmother and of his own parents.

=== Controversy over the "Blood of the vanquished" cycle ===
As the first volume in the Blood of the vanquished ("Il sangue dei vinti") cycle became more widely read, Pansa received criticism. There were complaints that he had tarnished the still iconic narrative of the wartime resistance, and that he had been motivated not by virtuous idealism, but by the lure of personal economic gain. The attacks came from many sides: Giorgio Bocca, a long-standing antagonist among Pansa's fellow journalists, was particularly withering with his references to "[journalist]-skinheads of the left".

There were allegations that Blood of the vanquished represented little more than a device intended to attract further editorial commissions from the Berlusconi media empire, while others asserted that the author had merely recycled and embellished incidents and events that had already been identified and recorded by others. Other detractors said that almost all the sources he had used were revisionist ones representing only the fascist viewpoint. That was one accusation that Pansa always rejected with particular vigour, insisting that he had used sources from across the political spectrum and shed new light on a part of history that deserved to be better known than it was. He stated he had done nothing to detract from the importance of wartime antifascist resistance. He pointed to the various descriptions included of atrocities committed by certain fascist fighters against resistance partisans before being killed themselves. Not all the critics were persuaded. There are reports of book launches at which Pansa found himself engaged in savage discussions about his Blood of the vanquished cycle, not just with members of the far-left but also by "academics" who charged him with the crime of "revisionism". At one event in Reggio Emilia, attended by angry groups both from the left and the right, fighting broke out. The episode came to the attention of President Giorgio Napolitano and Senate President Franco Marini, who condemned "the attack on Gaimpaolo Pansa" and "deplored the violence suffered": "We cannot accept what happened – in this case serious – to an intellectual who produces a work of historical reflection which I believe is worthwhile ... of course some share the opinions and some refute them, but there must be freedom for all works of history and literature".

There were also more nuanced reactions such as that of Ernesto Galli della Loggia, who reacted positively to Pansa's contributions, but still wondered in print what it said about the Italians that people were generally content to ignore many historical crimes for years on end, only taking an interest and providing opinions when a high-profile intellectual from the political left, such as Giampaolo Pansa, placed some such matters on the public agenda. Even the historian Sergio Luzzatto, whose initial bemusement over Blood of the vanquished had translated into a harsh negativity, later came round to an acceptance that the series contained "nothing made up" and demonstrated a reassuring "respect for history". Italian journalist Massimo Fini reviewed Pansa's work positively, but criticized him for relying too heavily on the History of the Civil War in Italy, a 3-volume history of the Italian Civil War published by fascist essayist Giorgio Pisanò in 1966.

=== Death ===
During his final years, Pansa lived with his wife at San Casciano, a small town in the hills beyond Siena. It is at San Casciano that his physical remains were interred following a funerary mass attended by townsfolk and journalist colleagues on 14 January 2020. He died in Rome on 12 January 2020 after several months of suffering with serious Colitis.

== Personal ==
Giampaolo Pansa married Lidia "Lillina" Casalone from Mortara in 1960. The marriage was followed by the birth, in 1962, of the couple's son, Alessandro. In 1993, Pansa also acquired a nephew called Giacomo through his marriage to "Lillina".

Giampaolo Pansa later married Adele Grisendi, a party member originally from Montecchio Emilia (RE). They lived as a "de facto couple" between 1989 and 2020, latterly in Tuscany. Adele Grisendi is a writer and former trades union organiser who for many years worked in a top position with the CGIL. She describes herself as a passionate Juventus supporter. She contributed extensively to the "Blood of the vanquished" cycle. They met on 23 November 1989, when she cautiously approached him and asked a question while they were travelling together on the train from Rome to Florence. (Note: "Dottor Pansa, lei non mi conosce. Mi chiamo Adele Grisendi e sono una comunista sofferente. Posso farle una domanda?") They moved in together a couple of months later.
