= Il Venerdì di Repubblica =

Weekly supplement of la Repubblica newspaper in Italy

- Frequency: Weekly
- Circulation: 522,858 (2010)
- First issue: 1 October 1987; 38 years ago
- Country: Italy
- Based in: Rome
- Language: Italian
- Website: il Venerdì
- OCLC: 220624423

Il Venerdì (full name: Il Venerdì di Repubblica), first published in October 1987, is a weekly supplement of la Repubblica, which deals with news, culture, politics and current affairs.

Its interior features services and dossier of various kinds along with regular columns by Curzio Maltese ("Contromano"), Michele Serra ("For mail"), Natalia Aspesi ("Matters of the heart"), Ascanio Celestine ("The Sheep black"), Diego Bianchi ("The dream of Zoro"), Piero Ottone ("Vices & virtues"), Stefano Bartezzaghi ("Lexicon and clouds"), Francesco Piccolo ("critical zone"), Corrado Augias ("My Babel"), Richard Iacona ("In 50 lines"), Dario Vergassola ("Is there life on Earth?"), Federico Grappling ("Analysis") and other important journalists of the Republic.

For several years Eugenio Scalfari had its own space where responded to letters from readers. Since the autumn of 2007, the heading of the letter is held by Michele Serra. Even Giorgio Bocca wrote for years under the heading "Facts ours" until 2011, the year of his death.

== Circulation ==
From January to August 2003 Il Venerdì sold 602,000 copies. Its 2004 circulation was 618,000 copies. It was the best-selling news magazine in Italy in 2007 with a circulation of 566,270 copies. In 2010 the circulation of the magazine was 522,858 copies.

== See also ==
- List of magazines in Italy
