= Crux (online newspaper) =

Independent news website focused on the Catholic Church

- Type: Online newspaper
- Founder(s): The Boston Globe; John L. Allen Jr.
- Editor: John L. Allen Jr.
- Founded: September 2014; 11 years ago
- Website: cruxnow.com

Crux is an online newspaper that focuses on news related to the Catholic Church. From September 2014 until March 2016, it was owned by The Boston Globe. Since April 2016, it has been independently owned.

== History ==
Crux was launched in September 2014, as part of a project by The Boston Globe to sponsor multiple specialized websites. It covered the Catholic Church and numerous subjects concerning life as a Catholic in the United States, including advice columns. Crux featured deep coverage of the Holy See and employed a Vatican correspondent in its six-person editorial staff. Its associate editor was John L. Allen Jr., a long-time and well-known Vatican watcher. Allen, together with Inés San Martín, today Rome Bureau Chief of Crux, and Shannon Levitt, associate editor, were the original founders of Crux, as he has referred to the news outlet after The Boston Globe decided to pull the plug.

On March 31, 2016, The Globe ended its association with Crux, citing a failure to bring in expected ad revenue, and transferred ownership of the website to the Crux staff. With Allen as the new editor, Crux received sponsorship from the Knights of Columbus and several Catholic dioceses. As of 2018, Allen remains the editor.

Crux's news reports have been quoted in numerous media, including The New York Times and The Washington Post. Writing in the Italian news magazine L'Espresso, journalist Sandro Magister described Crux as "the leading Catholic information portal in the United States and perhaps in the world."

== See also ==
- The Boston Globe
