= Eugenio Scalfari =

Italian journalist (1924–2022)

Eugenio Scalfari OMRI, LH
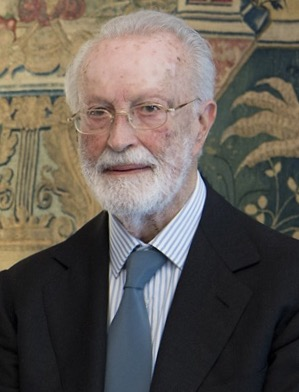

Member of the Chamber of Deputies
- In office 5 June 1968 – 24 May 1972
- Constituency: Turin

Personal details
- Born: 6 April 1924 Civitavecchia, Italy
- Died: 14 July 2022 (aged 98) Rome, Italy
- Party: PNF (1942–1943); PLI (1945–1955); PR (1955–1962); PSI (1962–1972)
- Spouses: Simonetta De Benedetti (m. 1950; died 2006) Serena Rossetti (m. 2008)
- Children: Two daughters
- Education: University of Genoa
- Profession: Journalist; Founder of La Repubblica

Eugenio Scalfari (Italian: [euˈdʒɛːnjo ˈskalfari]; 6 April 1924 – 14 July 2022) was an Italian journalist. He was editor-in-chief of L'Espresso (1963–1968), a member of Parliament in Italy's Chamber of Deputies (1968–1972), and co-founder of La Repubblica and its editor-in-chief (1976–1996). He was known for his meetings and interviews with important figures, including Pope Francis, Enrico Berlinguer, Aldo Moro, Umberto Eco, Italo Calvino, and Roberto Benigni.

== Early life and education ==
Scalfari was born in Civitavecchia, in the province of Rome, on 6 April 1924. He began secondary studies at the Mamiani High School in Rome. Scalfari's family, of Calabrian origin, later moved to Sanremo, where his father Pietro Scalfari was artistic director of the Casino, and he completed his high school studies there, at the G.D. Cassini school, where Italo Calvino was a classmate. About his friendship with Scalfari, Calvino wrote: "Dear Eugenio, your letters are like slaps on the back and I need slaps on the back, especially these days. ... My mouth is watering thinking about the delicious discussions we will have when we get together again."

In July 2021, about his lasting friendship with Calvino, which included discussions around books, the first girls, the exchange of letters, the evenings at the pool table, and the National Fascist Party Saturday marches, he recalled: "My adolescence began when I was fifteen in Sanremo: I think back to that age of life as I leaf through the Meridian which collects my books. First class of high school. The 'band', as immediately we baptized, the first trimester of school was formed." Philosophically, Scalfari underwent three phases: Benedetto Croce, the Age of Enlightenment, and the discovery of Friedrich Nietzsche. He was also influenced by Marcel Proust and Rainer Maria Rilke. An intellectual of Pannunzian training, he always supported and defended secularism in the politics of the Italian state.

== Career ==
In 1942 Scalfari, then a law student at the Sapienza University of Rome, joined the National Fascist Party and the Fascist University Groups (GUF) and started to cooperate with the local GUF magazine Roma Fascista, of which he eventually became editor-in-chief. He also worked with other Fascist publications like the Nuovo Occidente magazine. He was later expelled from the Fascist Party and dismissed from his journalistic positions in 1943 by order of party secretary Carlo Scorza after he had published unsubstantiated articles about alleged real estate speculations of some Fascist hierarchs in the construction of the EUR.

After his law graduation, Scalfari resumed his journalistic career in 1950 and worked for the influential post-war news magazines Il Mondo led by Mario Pannunzio and L'Europeo of Arrigo Benedetti. In 1955, as part of the Amici del Mondo group, he was among the founders of the Radical Party, of which he served as the national vice-secretary from 1958 to 1963.

In October 1955, jointly with Benedetti, Scalfari co-founded one of Italy's foremost news magazines L'Espresso with capital from the progressive industrialist Adriano Olivetti, manufacturer of Olivetti typewriters. The experienced Benedetti, who had directed L'Europeo (1945–1954), was the first editor-in-chief until 1963, when he handed over to Scalfari, who served as the administrative director and collaborator for the economy of L'Espresso until 1962. As an expert in financial mechanisms, Scalfari became the first Italian director manager. From 1963 to 1968, he was the editor of L'Espresso, of which he was also its vice-chairman. From 1970 to 1975, he was also managing director of the L'Espresso publishing company. In January 2016, he recalled that his journalistic career began with his dismissal by Banca Nazionale del Lavoro after his publication of an article.

In January 1976, the Gruppo Editoriale L'Espresso launched the daily newspaper La Repubblica in a joint venture with Arnoldo Mondadori Editore; its first issue came out on 14 January, with the slogan "From 14 January, you either believe the official versions or believe La Repubblica". It was also the first Italian newspaper to come out in the tabloid format. At the time, the paper had sixty editors, of which ten were professional journalists, as the others were at their first experience. Scalfari called some trusted colleagues, including Gianni Rocca, Giorgio Bocca, Sandro Viola, Miriam Mafai, Barbara Spinelli, Natalia Aspesi, and Giovanni Valentini. The satirical cartoons were drawn by Giorgio Forattini. The editorial office occupied four rooms in via Po 12 in Rome, the same place of L'Espresso headquarters. The La Repubblica project was not only a way to found a new newspaper but to propose a new school of journalism.

From 1984 to 1992, the newspaper played a role in the evolution of Europeanism and the Italian political left. Scalfari became the editor-in-chief and remained so until 1996, when he was succeeded by Ezio Mauro; he maintained a weekly column. Few believed such a venture could succeed in the already crowded Italian newspaper market; under Scalfari's skilful editorship, La Repubblica prospered to the point of rivaling the prestigious Corriere della Sera in both sales and status as a national daily. Scalfari put cultural pages at the centre of the paper, and remained active in both La Repubblica and L'Espresso. He also published a number of books including the 1969 work L'autunno della Repubblica ("Autumn of the Republic") and the 1998 novel Il labirinto ("The Labyrinth"). With Bernard Guetta, Scalfari had also tried to form a European newspaper based on an alliance between Italy's La Repubblica, France's Le Monde, Spain's El País, and Britain's The Independent. Additionally, he valorized the paper's female journalists, and wrote an article, titled "Feminine at Heart", for D – la Repubblica delle donne. He was the administrator for the paper's finance. In 2007, he abandoned his column Scalfari risponde ("Scalfari Answers") and was replaced by Michele Serra.

In February 1978, about a month before the kidnapping and killing of Aldo Moro, Scalfari was received by Aldo Moro, the former Prime Minister of Italy and the then leader of Christian Democracy (DC), in his studio in Rome. Moro explained to Scalfari his political project, from Giulio Andreotti's government to the alliance with the Italian Communist Party (PCI) with the aim of creating a modern political system in Italy, based on a normal alternation between the centre-left and the centre-right. The first objective, which was also shared by the PCI, was the defeat of the Red Brigades. During the 1980s, Scalfari travelled to the Soviet Union to meet its leader, Mikhail Gorbachev, in Moscow and was enthusiastic about perestroika. He was present to a roundtable in November 1989, where it was proposed by Giulio Tremonti, then a tax advisor to the Italian Socialist Party (PSI) finance minister Rino Formica, the idea of presumptively taxing not individual savers but large brokerage networks, which cost him his job. The context was what became known as liberalizzazione valutaria, the liberalization of capital. After this, no other roundtables were instituted.

=== Reporting ===
As a journalist, Scalfari was especially active in investigative reporting, uncovering illegal right-wing activities and major government cover-ups. In May 1967, along with Lino Jannuzzi, he uncovered Piano Solo, the attempted 1964 coup d'état led by the general and then Commander-General of the Carabinieri, Giovanni de Lorenzo. In the wake of this investigative reporting, the PSI offered him a seat as a member of Parliament, a position he held from 1968 to 1972, with disappointing results, as he himself recalled. Additionally, that same year he had been sued by de Lorenzo and sentenced to eighteen months as a result of the SIFAR–De Lorenzo scandal; only his election to the Italian Parliament avoided imprisonment. As an observer of political life and power in Italy, he investigated and analyzed other important moments of crisis in Italian politics, including the Enimont trial and Tangentopoli.

Among Scalfari's other notable reporting were his interviews and meetings with Pope Francis, whom he defined as his revolutionary pope, among other Italian Catholic figures. He reported the July 2014 statement by Pope Francis about Catholic Church sexual abuse cases that approximately 2% of the Roman Catholic Church's total number of priests, including bishops and cardinals, were pedophiles. In 2018, Scalfari wrote an article related to his interview with Pope Francis stating that the pontiff made claims that Hell did not exist. Scalfari later admitted that some words attributed to the pontiff "were not shared by Pope Francis" himself. Later in 2019, he wrote a further article related to Pope Francis, stating that the pope "rejects the godly nature of Jesus Christ". This was denied by the Holy See, which said that "as already stated on other occasions, the words that Dr. Eugenio Scalfari attributes in quotation marks to the Holy Father during talks with him cannot be considered a faithful account of what was actually said but represent a personal and free interpretation of what he heard, as appears completely evident from what is written today regarding the divinity of Jesus Christ."

== Politics ==
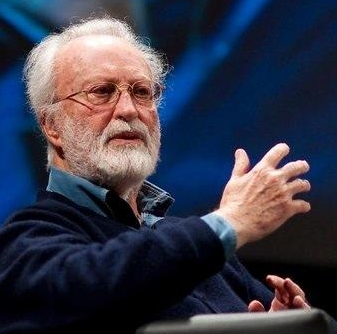
Scalfari in 2011

Initially, like many Italians of the time, Scalfari was a committed but non-aligned Italian fascist, and described himself as "a young, happy, and fascist". After the Second World War, Scalfari was close to the Italian Liberal Party (PLI). In 1956, he and several others on the left wing of the PLI, such as Marco Pannella and Ernesto Rossi, broke away in order to form the Radical Party. In 1968, as a candidate in the electoral districts of Turin and Milan, Scalfari was elected to Turin's single member district for the Turin–Novara–Vercelli constituency to the country's Chamber of Deputies, a position he held until 1972, as an independent aligned with the Italian Socialist Party (PSI) and handed over his post as editor to Gianni Corbi. As a member of the Italian Parliament, he was also a member of the Fifth Committee (Budget and State Holdings) from 10 July 1968 to 24 May 1972 and a member of the Twelfth Committee (Industry and Commerce) from 27 March 1970 to 24 May 1972.

Within the PSI, his paper L'Espresso was a supporter of Riccardo Lombardi. He also tried to influence the then major Italian parties, Christian Democracy (DC) and the Italian Communist Party (PCI), at the time led by Ciriaco De Mita and Enrico Berlinguer, respectively. The group of the paper's founders set for itself the goal of creating a third force between the DC and the PCI, in order to create "another protagonist who would balance them, custodian of secularism and of the sense of the state". It had a liberal culture that was attentive to social values and needs, including the modernization of the country and its economy, as well as the redemption of Southern Italy. According to Scalfari, the group shared the values of the Western world and saw in their cultural legacy the principles of the French Revolution and even more of the American Revolution, and was unreservedly in favour of a European federation and NATO, in which "the United States and Western Europe were seen as a single community", in addition to Israel. In June 2012, he described the paper thusly: "Progressive in politics, liberal in economics, conservative in custom."

=== Political positions ===
A liberal socialist, Scalfari described himself as "a libertarian", and also "a liberal of social mold". In the words of journalist Francesco Merlo, "Scalfarism ... is the strength of commitment and the lightness of style. But it is also the firm character that Italians do not have. And, why not, it is the liberal and libertine culture far from the sermons of the sacristy and the Gramscian school-cadres." Both Scalfari and La Repubblica were pro-choice in the 1981 Italian referendums that kept legal abortion in Italy. La Repubblica also held a critical line towards the former prime minister Silvio Berlusconi, especially criticizing his conflict of interest as both an entrepreneur and politician. Scalfari criticized Berlusconi's television channels and urged an investigation into the origins of his fortune.

Under Scalfari, the paper used to be known for its critical stand vis-à-vis the Catholic Church, a position that changed after the onset of the papacy of Pope Francis, whom Scalfari compared to the former Italian Communist Party leader Enrico Berlinguer. He wrote that "Enrico Berlinguer had a somewhat similar role in Italian politics (and not only) to the one Pope Francis is having today in the Catholic religion (and not only). Both followed a path of reformism so radical as to produce revolutionary effects; both were loved and respected even by their adversaries; both had a charisma that grasped reality and fueled a dream."

After the acquisition of La Repubblica by John Elkann in April 2020, Scalfari warned the paper not to move away from its liberal-socialist positions, which he described thusly: "I have always believed in a liberal socialism, capable of uniting equality and reformism ... at the forefront in guiding the country and Europe in this direction." Critics described the appointment of Maurizio Molinari as the editor-in-chief and other related changes, which led several journalists including Carlo De Benedetti to leave the paper, as the de-Scalfarization of the paper.

== Personal life and death ==
In 1950, Scalfari married Simonetta De Benedetti, daughter of the journalist Giulio De Benedetti; she died in 2006. From the end of the 1970s, Scalfari was romantically linked to Serena Rossetti, former editorial secretary of L'Espresso and later of La Repubblica, whom he married after the death of his first wife. From his first wife, he had two daughters, Donata and Enrica. Scalfari was an atheist. In 2013, he received a personal and detailed explanation from Pope Francis about atheism and forgiveness.

Scalfari died on 14 July 2022, at the age of 98. His death came during the 2022 Italian government crisis. Upon Scalfari's death, Pope Francis remembered him as a "laical friend". Among others, the paper's editor-in-chief Maurizio Molinari, the paper's owner John Elkann, La Stampa editor-in-chief Massimo Giannini, La Stampa and La Repubblica journalist Ezio Mauro, Democratic Party politicians like Enrico Letta and Walter Veltroni, and the paper's journalists and readers paid tribute to Scalfari, as did all major Italian institutional figures, and international figures like Bernard Guetta and France's Le Monde, as well as Spain's El País. Italy's Senate of the Republic held a minute of silence. La Repubblica published a special issue in his honour.

== Legacy ==
A popular journalist who revolutionized the profession in Italy, for his collaborator, Paolo Mauri, "[Scalfari's] great revolution was to put literature, art, the debate of ideas at the centre, even physical", of La Repubblica. Fellow journalist Michele Serra described him as "the last giant of classic journalism". In the words of Marco Ruffolo, Scalfari's main challenge, which he extended to journalism as a whole, was the checking of power. La Repubblica commented that Scalfari "changed the way of telling the country. Until the end he continued to write about philosophy, literature, and politics."

Lucio Caracciolo, the founder of the geopolitics magazine Limes, described La Repubblica as an absolute monarchy, with Scalfari as its enlightened king, and praised him for his way to handle important personalities with his charisma. Italian politician Giorgio La Malfa remembered how Scalfari helped Pietro Ingrao to enter into a dialogue with his father, Ugo La Malfa. He commented that Scalfari was right about Bettino Craxi but not Enrico Berlinguer, and said that "Eugenio Scalfari was a great journalist, obsessed with his creature to the point of sacrificing everything. But even though he is convinced that he has the same political talent, he hasn't always seen far, he has made serious mistakes, as with Berlinguer."

== Books ==
In the 1950s, Scalfari was the author of some publications of a political-economic nature that appeared in the series "Convegni degli amici del Mondo" (Rapporto sul neocapitalismo italiano; Potere economico in Urss). He was the author of numerous books, ranging from philosophical, historical, political, and religious works to novels, including L'autunno della Repubblica (1969), Razza padrona (1974, co-authored with Giuseppe Turani), Interviste ai potenti (1979), Come andremo a incominciare (1981, co-authored with Enzo Biagi), L'anno di Craxi (1984), La sera andavamo in via Veneto. Storia di un gruppo dal "Mondo" alla "Repubblica" (1986), Incontro con Io (1994), Alla ricerca della morale perduta (1995), Il labirinto, narrazione esistenziale a sfondo filosofico (1998), La ruga sulla fronte (2001), Articoli (2004), Dibattito sul laicismo (2005), L'uomo che non credeva in Dio (2008), Per l'alto mare aperto. La modernità e il pensiero danzante (2010), Scuote l'anima mia Eros (2011), La passione dell'etica. Scritti (1963–2012) (2012), Conversazioni con Carlo Maria Martini (2012, co-authored with Vito Mancuso), Dialogo tra credenti e non credenti, con Papa Francesco (2013), L'amore, la sfida, il destino. Il tavolo dove si gioca il senso della vita (2013), Racconto autobiografico (2014), L'allegria, il pianto, la vita (2015), L'ora del blu (2019), and Il Dio unico e la società moderna. Incontri con papa Francesco e il Cardinale Carlo Maria Martini (2019).

== Honours and awards ==
Scalfari received prestigious awards, such as the Trento International Award in 1988 for "A life dedicated to journalism", the Ischia International Journalism Award to his career in 1996, the Guidarello Award for author journalism in 1998, the Saint-Vincent Award in 2003, and the Viareggio Prize in 2019. He also received honorary citizenships (Vibo Valentia in 1990, Velletri in 1993, Vinci in 2007, and Sanremo in 2008), and honours, including that of Grand Official of the Order of Merit of the Italian Republic (1966), the Grand Cross Knight of the Order of Merit of the Italian Republic (1996), and the Knight Grand Cross of the Legion of Honour (1999).

== Bibliography ==
- Gnoli, Antonio; Merlo, Francesco (2019). Grand Hotel Scalfari: Confessioni libertine su un secolo di carta (in Italian). Padua: Marsilio. ISBN 978-88-297-0476-7 – via Google Books.
