= Alessandro Longo (journalist) =

Italian journalist (born 1976)

- Born: October 29, 1976 (age 50); Taranto
- Occupations: Editor in chief, technology journalist, technical evangelist

Alessandro Longo (born 29 October 1976 in Taranto) is an Italian technology journalist and editor-in-chief of the Italian newspapers Agendadigitale.eu and Cybersecurity360.

He has been a regular contributor to La Repubblica (over one thousand articles published), L'espresso and Il Sole 24 Ore, since 2003.

He also wrote a scientific book on Artificial Intelligence in 2020 (second edition 2021) for Mondadori Education, the academic branch of one of the biggest Italian publishers.

Around one hundred of his investigative features have been published on the first pages of La Repubblica and Il Sole 24 Ore over the years.

As technical evangelist he has been hosted since 2002 in some very popular TV programs on Rai 1, Rai 2 and Rai 3 and Striscia la Notizia (one of the most popular TV shows in Italy, with around 3-6 million viewers).

He is also a regular participant in the main Italian-Swiss radio station, Radiotelevisione svizzera (Radio 1).

He wrote the first Italian book on Voice over IP technology in 2005.

== Bibliography ==
- Come si fa a telefonare gratis, o quasi, con internet, ISBN 978-88-481-6908-0
- Intelligenza artificiale, ISBN 978-88-6184-808-5
