= Lino Jannuzzi =

Italian journalist and politician (1928–2024)

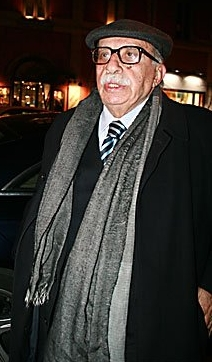
- Jannuzzi in 2008

Member of the Senate
- In office 5 June 1968 – 24 May 1972
- In office 30 May 2001 – 28 April 2008

Personal details
- Born: Raffaele Iannuzzi; 20 February 1928 Grottolella, Italy
- Died: 7 August 2024 (aged 96) Naples, Italy
- Party: PSI (1968–1972); Forza Italia (2001–2008)
- Occupation: Journalist, politician

Lino Jannuzzi (born Raffaele Iannuzzi; 20 February 1928 – 7 August 2024) was an Italian journalist and politician.

== Biography ==
Jannuzzi began his journalistic career at L'Espresso and in 1967, together with his colleague Eugenio Scalfari, published the investigation on the military secret services involved in the attempted coup d'état known as Piano Solo. General Giovanni de Lorenzo, the mind behind the Piano Solo, sued both Jannuzzi and Scalfari: the two journalists managed to avoid prison thanks to the parliamentary immunity offered in 1968 by the Italian Socialist Party, with which Scalfari was elected to the Chamber of Deputies and Jannuzzi to the Senate.

After this first political experience, Jannuzzi returned to journalism and in 1979 was one of the founders of Radio Radicale.

From 2001 to 2008, Jannuzzi held once again a seat in the Senate, elected with Silvio Berlusconi's Forza Italia, who granted him parliamentary immunity from several judicial controversies he was involved in.

Jannuzzi died on 7 August 2024, at the age of 96. At the time of his death he was a columnist for Panorama and for Il Giornale.

=== Judicial events ===
At the end of the 1990s, Jannuzzi was investigated for some articles in which he expressed numerous criticisms of the Neapolitan magistracy concerning the case of Enzo Tortora, considered a victim of a very serious judicial error. In 2002, Jannuzzi was sentenced to two years, five months and ten days of imprisonment for press defamation, and in 2004 he was forced to serve his sentence, transformed into a home detention sentence. One year later, in 2005, President Carlo Azeglio Ciampi signed a provision of grace for Jannuzzi.

==== Journalistic campaigns against the judges of Palermo ====
On 19 October 1991, Jannuzzi accused judge Giovanni Falcone, who was trying to get the licenses to create a power of contrast against the Mafia associations, of being the main one responsible for the inability of the country institutions to fight Cosa Nostra.

==== Journalistic campaigns against the judges of Milan ====
On 20 December 2001, Jannuzzi wrote on Panorama, after having written it on Il Giornale, that there was a plot against Silvio Berlusconi organised by several judges from Milan who, according to the words of Jannuzzi, tried to define strategies in order to arrest Berlusconi. Without any kind of evidence of the plot, Jannuzzi, Mondadori and the publishing house of Il Giornale were all sued, with the last two sentenced to a total reimbursement of €350,000.
