= Berluscones =

Italian press jargon

Berluscones is an Italian press jargon referring to politicians who broadly share Berlusconism, the political vision of Silvio Berlusconi. Generally, it is used with joking or negative connotation, since implies uncritical adhesion to the leader thesis and loyalty to the person rather than to the ideals.

Invented by the journalist and left-wing politician Curzio Maltese, the term derives from the more generic peones (Spanish term indicating the lackland labourers in Mexico led by Pancho Villa) that in Italy indicates those low-visibility parliamentarians that are considered useful only for the vote expression based on the indications of the several party leaders.

Some people, like Giuliano Ferrara, described themselves so. Others, like Fausto Bertinotti, were accused of being "Berluscommunists".
