= Mario Pirani =

Italian journalist, economist, and writer

Mario Pirani Coen (3 August 1925 – 18 April 2015) was an Italian journalist, economist, and writer.

== Biography ==
Born in Rome, he became a member of the Association of Journalists of Lazio in January 1958. Politically closed to the Italian Communist Party, he left it after the Soviet invasion of Hungary in 1956. He later became an officer of Eni, the Italian state-owned oil company.

After the experiences with Patrol, Il Giorno and Il Globo, he participated, together with Eugenio Scalfari, to the foundation of la Repubblica, a newspaper that became one of the first in Italy. He became the Deputy Director, with Gianni Rocca and Giampaolo Pansa. He was also editor of L'Europeo from 1979 to 1980, succeeding Giovanni Valentini. In 1995 he won the Premiolino.

He died in Rome on 18 April 2015, aged 89.

== Honors ==
- From August 3, 2005 – Knight Grand Cross of the Order of Merit of the Italian Republic
- From October 23, 2000 – Grand Officer of the Order of Merit of the Italian Republic

== Works ==
- Il fascino del nazismo. Il caso Jenninger: una polemica sulla storia, (The charm of Nazism. The case Jenninger: a controversy about the history), Il Mulino, 1989, pp. 157, ISBN 88-15-02337-2.
- Il futuro dell'economia visto dai maggiori economisti italiani, (The future of the economy seen by leading Italian economists), Arnoldo Mondadori Editore, 1993, pp. 229, ISBN 88-04-36582-X.
- È scoppiata la terza guerra mondiale? Le democrazie tra pacifismo e difesa, (You broke the third world war? Democracies between pacifism and defense, Arnoldo Mondadori Editore, 2004, pp. 302, ISBN 88-04-54624-7.
- Poteva andare peggio. Mezzo secolo di ragionevoli illusioni, (It could be worse. Half a century of reasonable illusions), Arnoldo Mondadori Editore, 2010, pp. 430, ISBN 88-04-59360-1.

Media offices
Preceded by Givovanni Valentini	Director of L'Europeo; April 19, 1979-February 21, 1980	Succeeded by Lamberto Sechi
