= Mario Orfeo =

Italian journalist (born 1966)

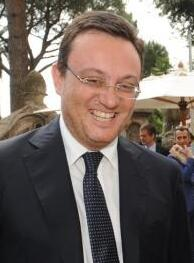
Orfeo in 2009

Mario Orfeo (born March 21, 1966) is an Italian journalist, who served as the general director of RAI from 2017 to 2018 and has been editor-in-chief of la Repubblica since October 7, 2024.

== Career ==
Orfeo began his career in the late 1980s, when he joined the newly established Naples bureau of La Repubblica in 1990. In the autumn of 1993, he transferred to the newspaper's headquarters in Rome, where he was appointed deputy head of the sports section. After three years, Orfeo transitioned from sports journalism to covering domestic affairs, under the guidance of editor-in-chief Ezio Mauro, who subsequently assigned him to the central editorial office. His career progressed further in 2000, with a promotion to deputy editor-in-chief.

In 2002, Orfeo was selected by publisher Francesco Gaetano Caltagirone to succeed Paolo Gambescia as the editor of Il Mattino, a prominent Naples-based daily.

On July 23, 2009, he was appointed director of TG2, upon the recommendation of general director Mauro Masi and with the unanimous approval of the RAI board of directors. He held this position until 2011.

On March 21, 2011, he was appointed editor of Il Messaggero, another newspaper in the Caltagirone Group, officially assuming the role on March 28. As a result of this new position, he resigned from his directorship at TG2 on March 31, 2011. Mario De Scalzi initially took over as interim director, followed by Marcello Masi.

On November 29, 2012, he was appointed director of TG1, succeeding Alberto Maccari, based on a proposal by RAI's General Director Luigi Gubitosi. His TG1 nomination was approved by a majority. On December 13, 2012, he introduced a new opening and visual design for the program. During his tenure, TG1 underwent substantial modernization: beginning on June 9, 2014, the program adopted digital production techniques, broadcasting in a 16:9 aspect ratio and in high-definition.

From June 9, 2017, to July 27, 2018, he served as General Director of RAI, succeeding Antonio Campo Dall'Orto, who had resigned shortly before.

On May 15, 2020, he was appointed director of TG3, replacing Giuseppina Paterniti. This appointment made him the first journalist to have directed all three of RAI's main news programs, and the second to have directed both TG1 and TG3, following Nuccio Fava.

In November 2021, he was named head of RAI's in-depth content division, but in June 2022, he was dismissed from the position by CEO Carlo Fuortes. Shortly thereafter, he was reinstated as director of TG3, a role he held until October 6, 2024, when he was appointed editor-in-chief of La Repubblica, with the position becoming effective on October 7.
