= Daniela Hamaui =

Italian journalist (born 1954)

- Born: 21 November 1954 (age 70); Cairo, Egypt
- Occupation: Journalist

Daniela Hamaui (born 21 November 1954) is an Italian journalist and was the editor of the Rome-based magazine L'Espresso from 2002 to 2010.

Prior to her stint at L'espresso, she was the founding editor of the magazine D – la Repubblica delle donne, published since 1996 with the newspaper La Repubblica. Hamaui has voiced concerns about legislation on telecommunications introduced by the Berlusconi administration and proposed a provision that would temporarily bar the owners of TV stations (including Berlusconi) from buying up print media groups.

Currently she serves as editorial director of the periodicals of La Repubblica, and has the editorial supervision of various monthlies.

== Biography ==
Hamaui was born in Cairo, Egypt. She earned a bachelor of arts degree in literature (with specialization in teaching) at Università Statale di Milano in 1978, and then studied at the Institute for Journalism Training in Milan.

She then began to write for La Repubblica, Corriere della Sera and the cultural pages of Il Sole 24 ore. In 1995 she became editor of the monthly CentoCose published by Arnoldo Mondadori Editore.

On 15 July 2010 it was announced that Hamaui would serve as editorial director of the magazine La Repubblica. She was replaced by Bruno Manfellotto as the editor-in-chief of L'Espresso.
