= Khaled Fouad Allam =

Member of the Chamber of Deputies of the Italian Republic
- In office April 28, 2006 – April 28, 2008
- Constituency: Apulia

Personal details
- Born: September 2, 1955 Tlemcen, Algeria
- Died: June 10, 2015 (aged 59) Rome, Italy
- Occupation: Sociologist, academic, journalist, politician

Khaled Fouad Allam (September 2, 1955 – June 10, 2015) was an Algerian-born Italian sociologist, journalist, and politician who served in the Italian Chamber of Deputies from 2006 to 2008.

== Biography ==
Allam studied sociology at the Sorbonne and worked as an academic at the University of Trieste and the University of Urbino, focusing on Islamic studies and multiculturalism. He contributed as a columnist to Italian media outlets including la Repubblica. Entering politics, he was elected to parliament in 2006 representing Apulia with The Daisy coalition. He passed away in Rome on June 10, 2015.

== Awards and honors ==
- Grinzane Cavour-Cesare Pavese Prize (2004)
- Elsa Morante Prize (2004)
- Prize of the Italian Senate (2007)

== Selected publications ==
- I due stati. Società e potere in islam e occidente (1990)
- L'Islam globale (2002)
- Lettera a un kamikaze (2004)
- La solitudine dell'occidente (2006)

== See also ==
- Islam in Italy
