= D la Repubblica =

Italian fashion supplement

- Cover of the 28 September 2025 issue, Lulu Tenney by Tim El Kaïm
- Editor-in-Chief: Emanuele Farneti
- Categories: Fashion
- Frequency: Weekly
- Founder: Daniela Hamaui
- First issue: 21 May 1996
- Company: la Repubblica S.p.A. (1996–1998); Gruppo Editoriale L'Espresso (1998–2016); GEDI Gruppo Editoriale (2016–present)
- Country: Italy
- Based in: Rome
- Language: Italian
- Website: d.repubblica.it
- ISSN: 1128-6083

D (stylised in lower case), full name D la Repubblica delle donne ("D the Republic of women"), is an Italian weekly fashion supplement. It began publication in 1996 and every Saturday accompanies the daily general-interest newspaper la Repubblica. An English-language bi-annual version of the supplement for international audiences has been published since 2024.

== Background ==
D la Repubblica is an Italian fashion newspaper supplement founded in 1996 by Daniela Hamaui as D la Repubblica delle Donne and is commonly referred to as D or D la Repubblica.

The magazine is a weekly publication.

=== Editors ===
Editor-in-Chief	Start year	End year
Daniela Hamaui	1996	2002
Kicca Menoni	2002	
Valeria Palermi	2015	2021
Emanuele Farneti	2022	present

== History ==
=== Beginnings, under Daniela Hamaui (1996–2002) ===
D la Repubblica delle donne debuted on 21 May 1996, the first issue's cover featured British model Stella Tennant. Daniela Hamaui founded the supplement and served its editor-in-chief until 2002 when she was appointed editor of L'Espresso.

=== Under Kicca Menoni and later Valeria Palermi (2002–2021) ===
Following Hamauis departure, Kicca Menoni (editor-in-chief of Italian Marie Claire, 1994 to 2002) was appointed editor-in-chief. Vittorio Zucconi contributed to the supplement during this period.

=== Contemporary era, under Emanuele Farneti (2022–present) ===
Emanuele Farneti became editor-in-chief of the supplement on 1 November 2021. Valeria Palermi exited the position on 31 October. Farneti previously served as the editor-in-chief of Vogue Italia from 2017 to 2021.

In November 2024, D The Biannual was launched as an bi-annual spinoff of D la Repubblica published in English and distributed around the world. Published in mid-April and mid-October (from 2025), the magazine was created to overcome the issues that D la Repubblica faced trying to cater to a growing international audience.

== Editions ==
- D la Repubblica delle donne (1996–present; Italy - edited by Emanuele Farneti)
- D The Biannual (2024–present; Worldwide - edited by Emanuele Farneti)

== See also ==
- La Repubblica
