= Rodolfo De Benedetti =

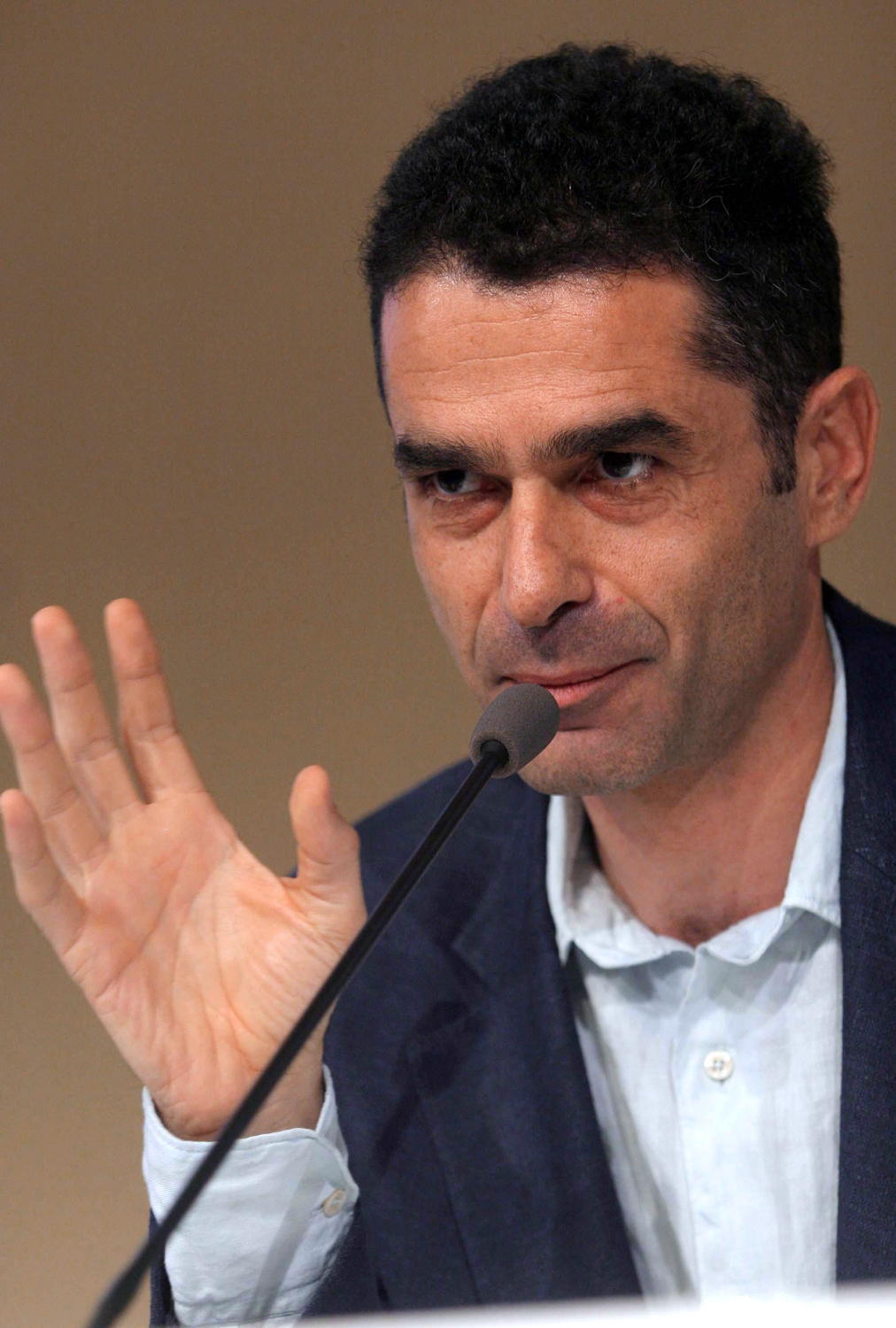
- De Benedetti in 2011
- Born: July 2, 1961 (age 64); Turin, Italy
- Occupations: Entrepreneur, media owner

Rodolfo De Benedetti (born 2 July 1961) is an Italian entrepreneur and company executive. He is the chairman of the CIR Group (Compagnie Industriali Riunite).

== Biography ==
Rodolfo De Benedetti was born in Turin in July 1961, the eldest son of Carlo De Benedetti and Mita Crosetti. He has two brothers, Marco and Edoardo.

In 1982 he graduated from the University of Geneva for his bachelor's degree in political economics, and in 1985 he graduated with a law degree. He started working from September 1985 to December 1986 for LODH in Geneva as assistant to the chief executive and, from January 1987 to January 1988, for Shearson Lehman/American Express (New York) as an associate in the merchant banking sector.

Having completed this experience abroad, he began working for the family businesses. From January 1988 to March 1989, he was director of international affairs for the family financial holding company COFIDE. From 1990 to 1993, he held the position of general manager of CIR Group and, from 1989 to 1995, also of COFIDE.

From his entry into the family business, Rodolfo De Benedetti worked on restructuring the CIR Group, transforming it into a diversified holding company. Today, the CIR group consists essentially of three industrial businesses: SOGEFI, the international automotive components group that is among the world leaders in the production of engine systems and suspension components; Gruppo Editoriale L'Espresso, one of the main publishing and multimedia groups in Italy; KOS, which is one of the top private operators in the care-home sector in Italy.

Since 2014, he has been a shareholder and partner of Decalia, the international asset management company based in Geneva.

Rodolfo De Benedetti was previously Chief Executive of CIR Group and COFIDE. he is on the Board of Directors of Gruppo Editoriale L'Espresso, SOGEFI and of Decalia Asset Management.

In March 2013, his father Carlo De Benedetti transferred control of the group to him and his brothers Marco and Edoardo, free of charge. Following this transfer, in April 2013, Rodolfo De Benedetti was appointed Chairman of COFIDE and of the CIR Group.

== Other activities ==
=== Corporate boards ===
- UCB, Independent Member of the Board of Directors (2009–2012)
- Altin AG, Member of the Board of Directors (2001–2007)

=== Non-profit organizations ===
- European Round Table of Industrialists (ERT), Member (since 2006)
- Harvard Business School, Member of the European Advisory Board (since 2006)

== Personal life ==
De Benedetti is married to the writer Emmanuelle de Villepin and has three daughters, Neige, Alix, and Mita.
