= Inés San Martín =

Argentine journalist

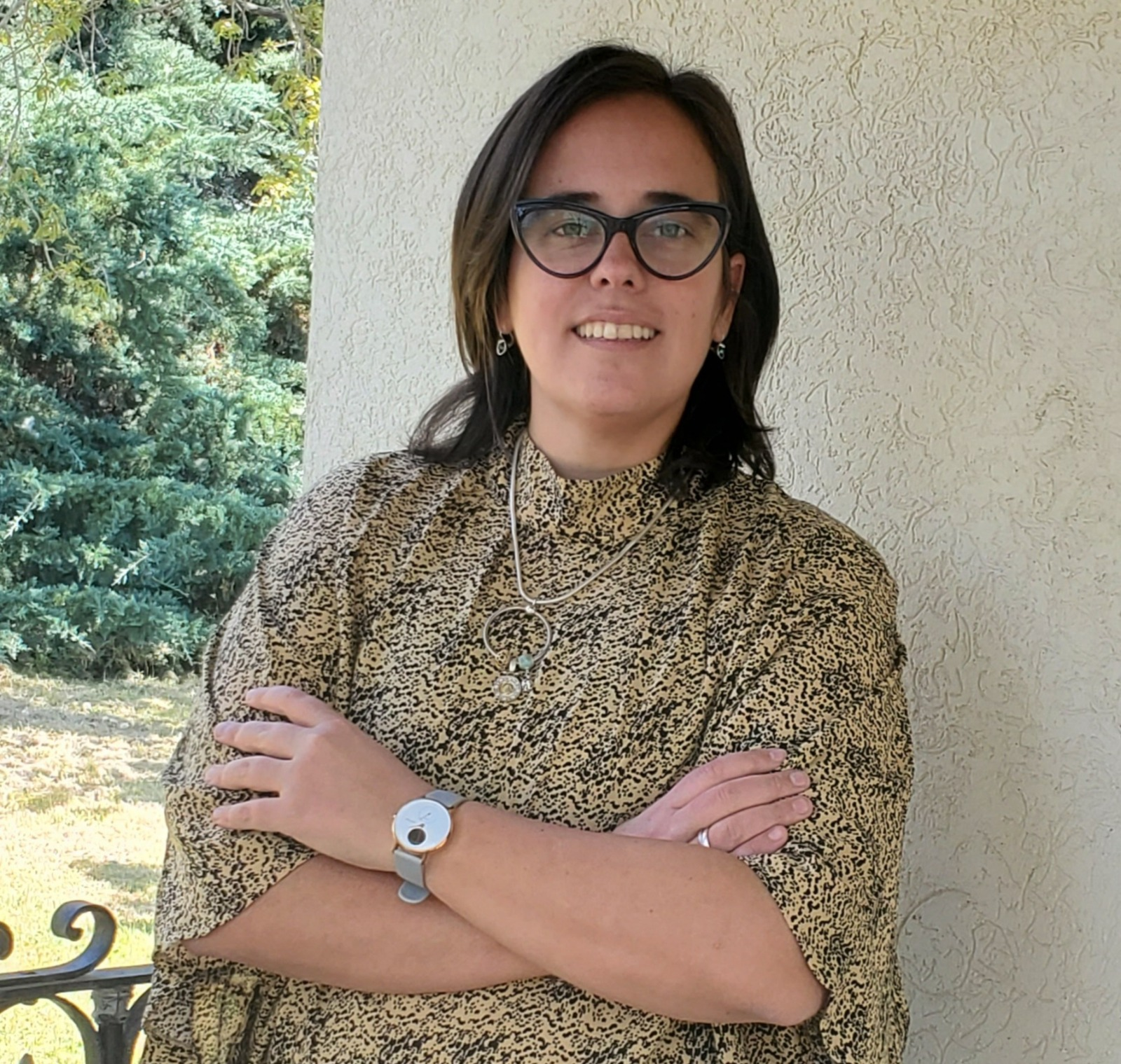
- Born: 1986 (age 39–40)
- Occupation: Editor MISSION Magazine
- Organization: The Pontifical Mission Societies

Inés San Martín (born 1986) is an Argentine journalist who serves as the editor of MISSION Magazine, the quarterly publication of the Pontifical Mission Societies USA. Her work as a journalist is regularly featured in OSV News.

Between 2022 and early 2026, she served as VP of Marketing and Communications of the Pontifical Mission Societies. She was previously co-editor and Rome head of Crux between 2014 and 2022.

San Martin graduated with a master's degree in communication from Austral University, and began working as a journalist in the Valores Religiosos Clarín in October 2012. She was responsible for international communication for World Youth Day 2013. She also led the international media efforts for Pope Leo XIV's visit to Spain in 2026.

In June 2014, she started working at Crux, a newly created project promoted by The Boston Globe and led by John L. Allen Jr. that became an independent newspaper in April 2016. San Martín was a correspondent at the Vatican until July 2018, when she became responsible for the newspaper in Rome and co-editor with Allen. She traveled with Pope Francis to more than 30 countries.

She has given talks on Pope Francis, the Vatican and Church communications in the United States, Chile, Mexico, Italy and Ireland.

MISSION Magazine is the quarterly publication of The Pontifical Mission Societies USA, founded in 1951 by Archbishop Fulton J. Sheen, who served as National Director of the organization between 1950 and 1966.
