= Maurizio Molinari =

Italian journalist (born 1964)

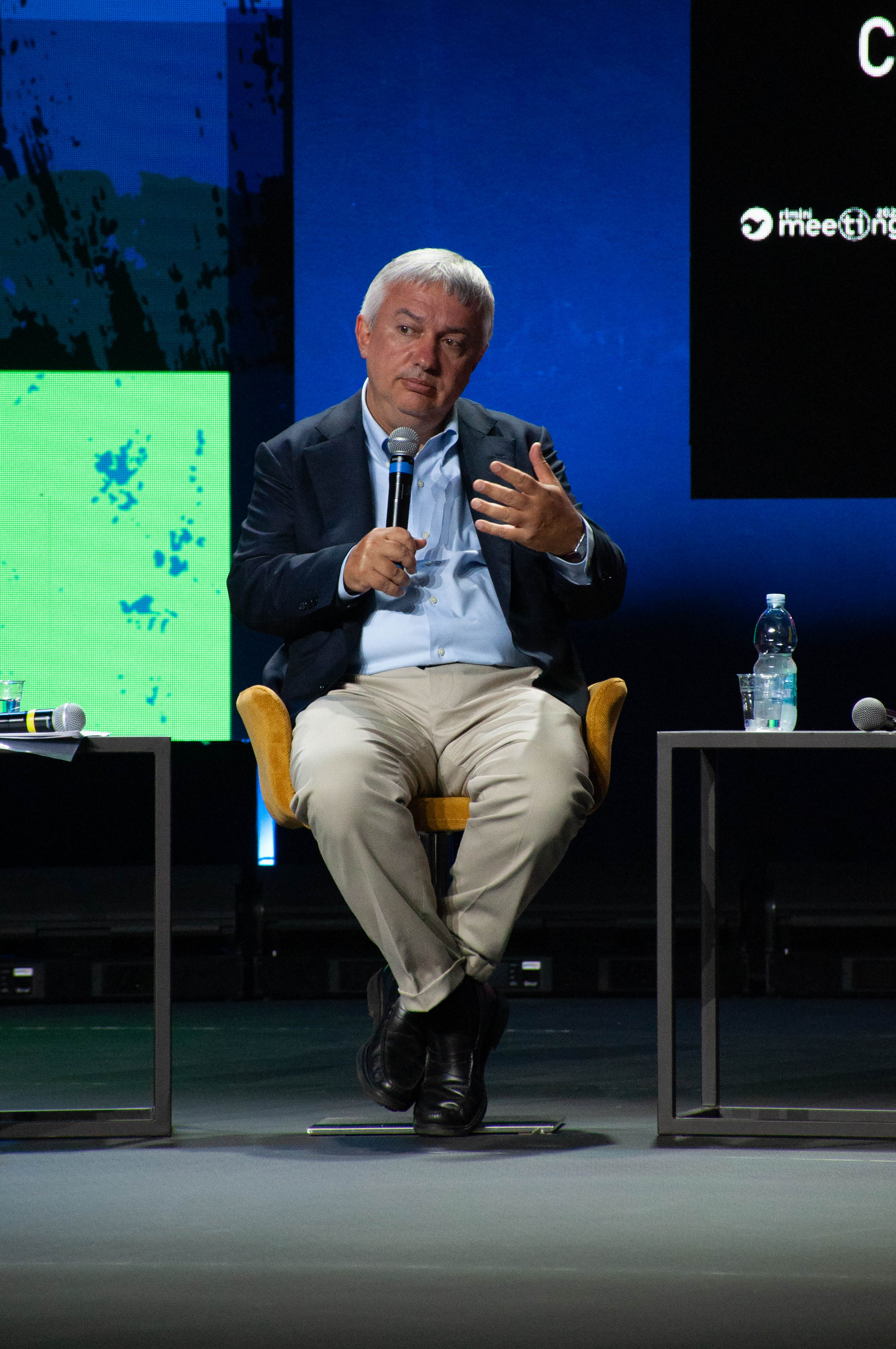
Maurizio Molinari

Maurizio Molinari (born 28 October 1964 in Rome, Italy) is an Italian journalist, who was editor-in-chief of the daily la Repubblica between 23 April 2020 and 6 October 2024, after serving five years as editor-in-chief of la La Stampa.

== Education and early career ==
Molinari graduated in 1989 with a bachelor's degree in political science from La Sapienza University in Rome and, in 1993, with a degree in history from the same university. He also studied at the Hebrew University of Jerusalem in Israel and at Manchester College, Oxford in the United Kingdom.

At the same time, in 1984, he started working as a journalist for La Voce Repubblicana, the newspaper of the Italian Republican Party, and achieved professional journalist status in 1989.

Molinari lives between New York City and Turin. He has been married since 1994 to Micol Braha. They have four children.

=== Journalist at La Stampa ===
Molinari arrived at La Stampa in 1997, and for over a decade he worked as a correspondent, first from Brussels, then from New York City, and since 2014 from Jerusalem and Ramallah, before returning to Turin as editor-in-chief in 2016.

Molinari also writes for several Italian newspapers and news magazines, including La Voce Repubblicana, Il Tempo, L'Indipendente, L'Opinione, Il Foglio, and Panorama.

A journalist since 1989, he covered the conflicts in the Balkans, the Middle East and the Horn of Africa. Among the leaders he interviewed, there are the US presidents George W Bush and Barack Obama, the US Secretary of State Condoleezza Rice, Madeleine Albright and Henry Kissinger, the UN Secretary General Kofi Annan and Ban Ki moon, Libyan colonel Qaddafi, Saudi king Abdallah, Israeli prime ministers Netanyahu and Peres, Israeli president Rivlin, PLO chairman Arafat, Palestinian president Abbas, the Pkk commander Ocalan, the Iraqi Kurdish president Barazani, the Turkish president Erdogan, the Ukrainian president Zelenskyy and the UN envoy on climate Mark Carney

Molinari is a regular guest commentator on Italian TV, including on La7, Rainews24, TgCom and SkyTg24. He has occasionally been a panelist on CNN, CBS and The NewsHour with Jim Lehrer, aired on the Public Broadcasting Service.

His main reference points are deemed to be Foreign Affairs, Publishing Industry and History.

=== Essayist ===
Between 2000 and 2025, Molinari was a prolific essayist, publishing an average of one book per year. Molinari is the author of 27 non-fiction books, all published in Italian: The Jews in Italy: A Problem of Identity (1870-1938) (published by La Giuntina in 1991), The Left and Jews in Italy (1967-1993) (Corbaccio, 1995), The National Interest (Laterza, 2000), Between White House and Botteghe Oscure: Interview with Lamberto Dini (Guerini and Ass, 2001), Wall Street in the Third Millennium (Fondazione Liberal), 2003, No Global? (Laterza, 2003), George W. Bush and the American Mission (Laterza, 2004), Italy Seen by the CIA (1948-2004) (Laterza, 2005), The Jews of New York (Laterza, 2007), Democratic Cowboys (Einaudi 2008), Obama's Country (Laterza, 2009), The Italians of New York (Laterza, 2011), Shadow Government (Rizzoli, 2012), The Eagle and the Butterfly (Rizzoli, 2013), The Caliphate of Terror (Rizzoli, 2015), Jihad. Attack to the West (Rizzoli, 2015), "The Return of the Tribes" (Rizzoli 2016), Duel in the Ghetto (Rizzoli, 2017), "Why It Did Happen Here" (Nave di Teseo, 2018), "The West under Assault" (Nave di Teseo, 2019), "Atlas of a Changing World" (Rizzoli, 2020), "The battlefield" (Nave di Teseo, 2021), "The Return of Empires" (Rizzoli, 2022), "Mediterrean Disputed" (Rizzoli, 2023), "The New War against Democracies" (Rizzoli, 2024) and "Global Shake" (Rizzoli, 2025)

His "The Caliphate of Terror" (2015) has been presented by Roberto Saviano as the book "we all should read".

His book "La nuova guerra contro le democrazie" was published in 2024.

=== Editor-in-chief of La Stampa and la Repubblica ===
On 26 November 2015, Molinari is nominated new editor-in-chief of the Turin daily La Stampa, replacing Mario Calabresi, who was heading to Rome to take the place of Ezio Mauro as editor-in-chief of La Repubblica. The president of EXOR, John Elkann, chooses Molinari over the deputy editor Massimo Gramellini, and flanks him with Massimo Russo (former editor of Wired Italia) as co-director. In December 2017, Molinari became editorial director of GNN, the Gedi News Network that includes La Stampa, Secolo XIX and the local papers of the former Finegil Group. On 23 April 2020, he became editor-in-chief of la Repubblica.

On 17 July 2021, his newspaper, la Repubblica, had the infamous "Hunt for the non-vaccinated. They are 17 million more" on its front page. In November 2021, Molinari was attacked by Maria Zakharova, spokeswoman for the Kremlin's Ministry of Foreign Affairs, because of a news analysis about Putin's grip on the European Union. "Russian President Vladimir Putin poses a hybrid threat", wrote Molinari, "generating parallel crises to grip the European Union in a vice". Zakharova called Molinari's analysis "a delicious absurdity". Decode39 noted that in denying accusations, the Kremlin confirms its whole line from Ukraine to natural gas.

On 9 April 2024, Molinari was distrusted by the editorial staff of La Repubblica following a series of disputes. The no-confidence was motivated by Molinari's decision to eliminate 100,000 copies of the Affari&Finanza insert following an article unpopular with the newspaper's ownership and subsequently replaced, as well as a prior editorial management that saw the divestment of parts of the editorial group, an editorial line close to business and industrial interests, and pro-Israeli foreign political positions.

These actions generated discontent among journalists and readers, culminating in the no-confidence motion passed with 164 votes in favour and 55 against.

== Participation in Bilderberg and WEF meetings ==
Maurizio Molinari was a participant in the 2017 Bilderberg Meeting, as noted in the official website of the Bilderberg group, which publishes the list of participants, as well as of the 2019 and 2020 WEF Annual Meeting.
