= Piano Solo =

Envisaged plot for an Italian anti-communist coup in 1964

Piano Solo was an envisaged plot for an Italian anti-communist coup in 1964 requested by then president of the Italian Republic, Antonio Segni. It was prepared by the commander of the Carabinieri, Giovanni de Lorenzo, in the beginning of 1964 in close collaboration with the Italian secret service SIFAR, CIA secret warfare expert Vernon Walters, then chief of the CIA station in Rome William King Harvey, and Renzo Rocca, director of the Gladio units within the military secret service SID. It was named Solo (Italian for "alone" or "only") because it was supposed to be directed only by the Carabinieri.

== Background ==
The plan was delivered on 25 May. It consisted of a set of measures to occupy certain institutions, such as Quirinal Palace in Rome, and essential media infrastructures (television, radio), including the neutralization of the communist and socialist parties, such as detention of cadres of the Italian Communist Party (PCI), as well as takeover of the premises of the PCI, the Italian Socialist Party (PSI), the Italian Socialist Party of Proletarian Unity (PSIUP) and the newspaper l'Unità, Avanti! and Mondo Nuovo). The pretext for such measures would have been a false flag attempted assassination of prime minister Aldo Moro by paratroop colonel Roberto Podesto, who would subsequently allege that he was ordered to do so by the PCI.

In response to this incident, it was planned to deport the political cadres of the PCI to a secret base in Sardinia, the premises also used by the Italian Gladio network at Capo Marrargiu. The list of people to be deported also included intellectuals, such as Pier Paolo Pasolini. The secret was badly guarded, since as early as summer rumors of a coup were circulating during the difficult negotiations that led to the formation of Aldo Moro's government (26 June–17 July).

== Controversy ==
The coup plans were investigated in 1967, when the journalist Eugenio Scalfari and Lino Jannuzzi uncovered the attempt in the Italian news magazine L'Espresso in May 1967 based on revelations from mafioso and KGB informant Nicola Gentile. The results of the official investigation remained classified until the early 1990s. It was released by prime minister Giulio Andreotti to the parliamentary investigation into Operation Gladio. L'Espresso mentioned that some 20,000 Carabinieri were supposed to be deployed around the country, with 5,000 of them taking over Rome, including publishing outlets and the PCI headquarters. The Financial Times posed the possibility that the paper coup was simply used as a way to sway coalition talks between Christian Democracy and the PSI. Antonio Segni was apparently running out of patience with the demands from Pietro Nenni.

== See also ==
- Golpe Borghese
- Clockwork Orange (plot) (1974–75) in the United Kingdom

== Bibliography ==
- Cento Bull, Anna (2007). Italian Neofascism: The Strategy of Tension and the Politics of Nonreconciliation. Oxford: Berghahn Books. ISBN 1-84545-335-2.
- Ganser, Daniele (2004). Nato's Secret Armies: Operation Gladio and Terrorism in Western Europe. London: Cass.
