= Monica Mondardini =

Italian emanager

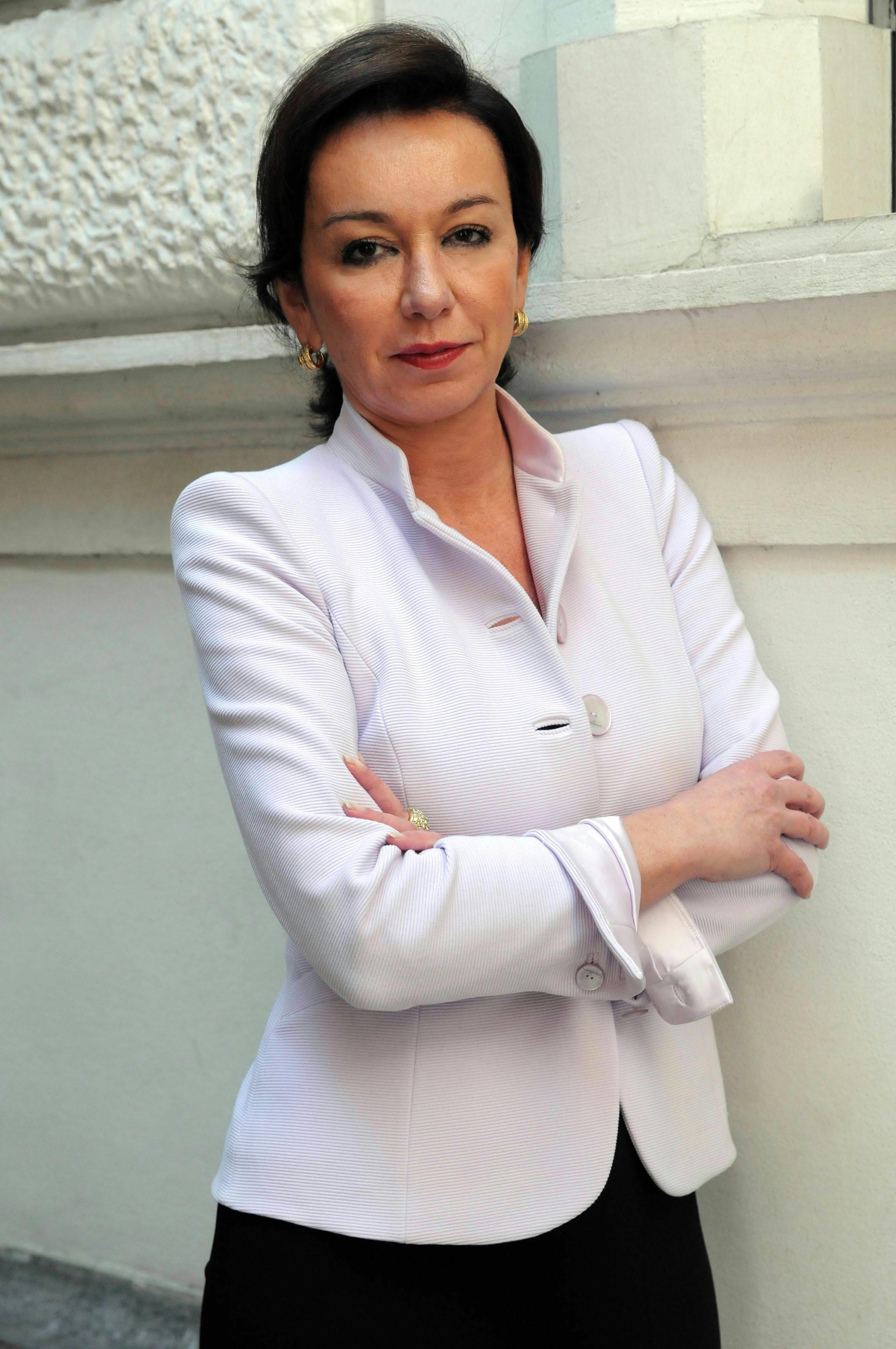
Monica Mondardini, CEO of CIR

Monica Mondardini (born 26 September 1960) is an Italian emanager, currently chief executive officer of the CIR Group (Compagnie Industriali Riunite) and of its subsidiary Gruppo Editoriale L'Espresso.

== Biography ==
A graduate in statistical and economic sciences from the University of Bologna, she began her managerial career in the publishing sector in 1985 in the Fabbri Group, taking part in an international development project. In 1990 she joined Hachette (Lagardère group) as sirector of the Spanish branch of Hachette Livre; subsequently she was appointed sirector of the international branch with headquarters in Paris and also became a member of the executive committee of Hachette Livre.

In 1998 she joined the Assicurazioni Generali group as chief executive officer of Europ Assistance in Paris. Two years later she returned to Italy to head up the Planning and Control Service of the general management of Generali in Trieste. In 2001 she moved to Madrid to take up the position of chief executive of Generali España.

On December 1, 2008, she became chief executive officer of Gruppo Editoriale L'Espresso, one of the main publishing groups in Italy. Under her leadership, despite the difficult economic situation in the sector, Espresso is one of the few publishing houses in Italy to be profitable. On May 20, 2010, she was elected to the Board of the French bank Crédit Agricole. In 2012 she was appointed chief executive officer of CIR Group (Compagnie Industriali Riunite), the holding company that controls Gruppo Editoriale L’Espresso, Sogefi and KOS. In 2015 she became chairman of Sogefi.

== Other activities ==
- Atlantia, Member of the Board of Directors
- Hera Group, Non-Executive Independent Member of the Board of Directors

== Honours ==
- In 2014 she received the Italian personality of the year award from the French Embassy and Chamber of Commerce in Italy.
- On 12 May 2016 she received the Legion of Honour of the French Republic
