= CIR Group =

Italian holding company

Compagnie Industriali Riunite S.p.A.
- Company type: Società per azioni
- Traded as: BIT: CIR; FTSE Italia Mid Cap
- Industry: Holding company
- Founded: 1976; 50 years ago
- Headquarters: Milan, Italy
- Key people: Rodolfo De Benedetti (Executive Chairman), Monica Mondardini (CEO)
- Products: Industrial holdings
- Revenue: €2,621 million (end 2016)
- Number of employees: 18,648 (2020)
- Website: www.cirgroup.it

CIR Group (Italian: Compagnie Industriali Riunite; lit. 'United Industrial Companies') is an Italian holding company that is active in media, automotive components, and the healthcare sectors. It is listed on the Italian Stock Exchange and is 46% controlled by COFIDE of the De Benedetti family.

In 2016 the CIR group reported revenues of 2.6 billion euro and a net income of 34 million euro. The group has more than 14 thousand employees.

== History ==
The company was founded in 1976, when Carlo De Benedetti acquired the company Concerie Italiane Riunite, a Turin based tanning company, from its historic owner the Bocca family and transformed it into an industrial holding company. The company was then renamed Compagnie Industriali Riunite.

Chief Executive of CIR for almost twenty years, Rodolfo De Benedetti is now Executive Chairman of the company. Monica Mondardini is Chief Executive.

== Holdings ==
In the media sector CIR controls GEDI, the publishing company listed on the Italian stock exchange, which owns the daily newspapers la Repubblica and La Stampa, the weekly magazine L’Espresso plus other magazines, 14 local newspapers, three national radio stations (Radio Deejay, Radio Capital and m2o), a digital division and an advertising concessionaire. The group is a shareholder with a 30% interest in the network operator Persidera. In 2016 GEDI reported revenues of 585.5 million euro.

In automotive components it is present with the subsidiary SOGEFI, one of the main operators worldwide in three business sectors: filtration, air and cooling and suspension components. Founded in Mantua in 1980, SOGEFI today supplies the most important car manufacturers worldwide and operates in 23 countries in four continents with 41 production plants. SOGEFI's history includes numerous acquisitions, particularly in Europe and South America, the most recent of which was that of Mark IV Systèmes Moteurs (engine systems), completed at the end of July 2011. Sogefi's revenues for 2016 were almost 1.6 billion, all-time high for the group.

KOS, which is controlled by CIR with the F2i Healthcare fund also having an interest, operates in the care-home sector. Established in 2002 with the name Holding Sanità e Servizi, KOS is active in the management of care homes (with the brand Anni Azzurri) and rehabilitation centres (Santo Stefano). The company also supplies and manages diagnostic and therapeutic medical technology through its subsidiary Medipass. The KOS group is one of the main Italian operators in this field with 78 facilities under management in the centre and north of Italy. In 2011 the group launched a joint venture in India in the medical technology sector and in 2012 took over management of technologies in two important cancer hospitals in the United Kingdom. KOS employs some 5,000 people and has an annual turnover of approximately 460 million euro.

The CIR group is active in various investment initiatives such as the venture capital fund CIR Ventures, has a series of interests in the private equity sector and a portfolio of non-performing loans.

== Principal Shareholdings ==
- GEDI Gruppo Editoriale S.p.A. (43.4%)
- Sogefi S.p.A. (57.1%)
- KOS S.p.A. (59.5%)

== Board of directors ==
The Board of Directors of CIR, appointed on April 28, 2017, consists of eleven directors, six of whom are independent. The current Board will remain in office until the approval of the Financial Statements for the year ended December 31, 2019. The Board has the following Directors:

- Rodolfo De Benedetti, Executive Chairman
- Monica Mondardini, Chief Executive Officer
- Edoardo De Benedetti, Director
- Marco De Benedetti, Director
- Philippe Bertherat, Director
- Franco Debenedetti, Director
- Patrizia Grieco, Director
- Silvia Giannini, Director
- Maristella Botticini, Director
- Claudio Recchi, Director
- Guido Tabellini, Director

== Shareholders ==
- COFIDE S.p.A. – 45.8%
- Bestinver Gestion (an investment subsidiary of Acciona) - 13.9%
- Treasury shares 16,6%
