= Carlo De Benedetti =

Italian industrialist, engineer, and publisher (born 1934)

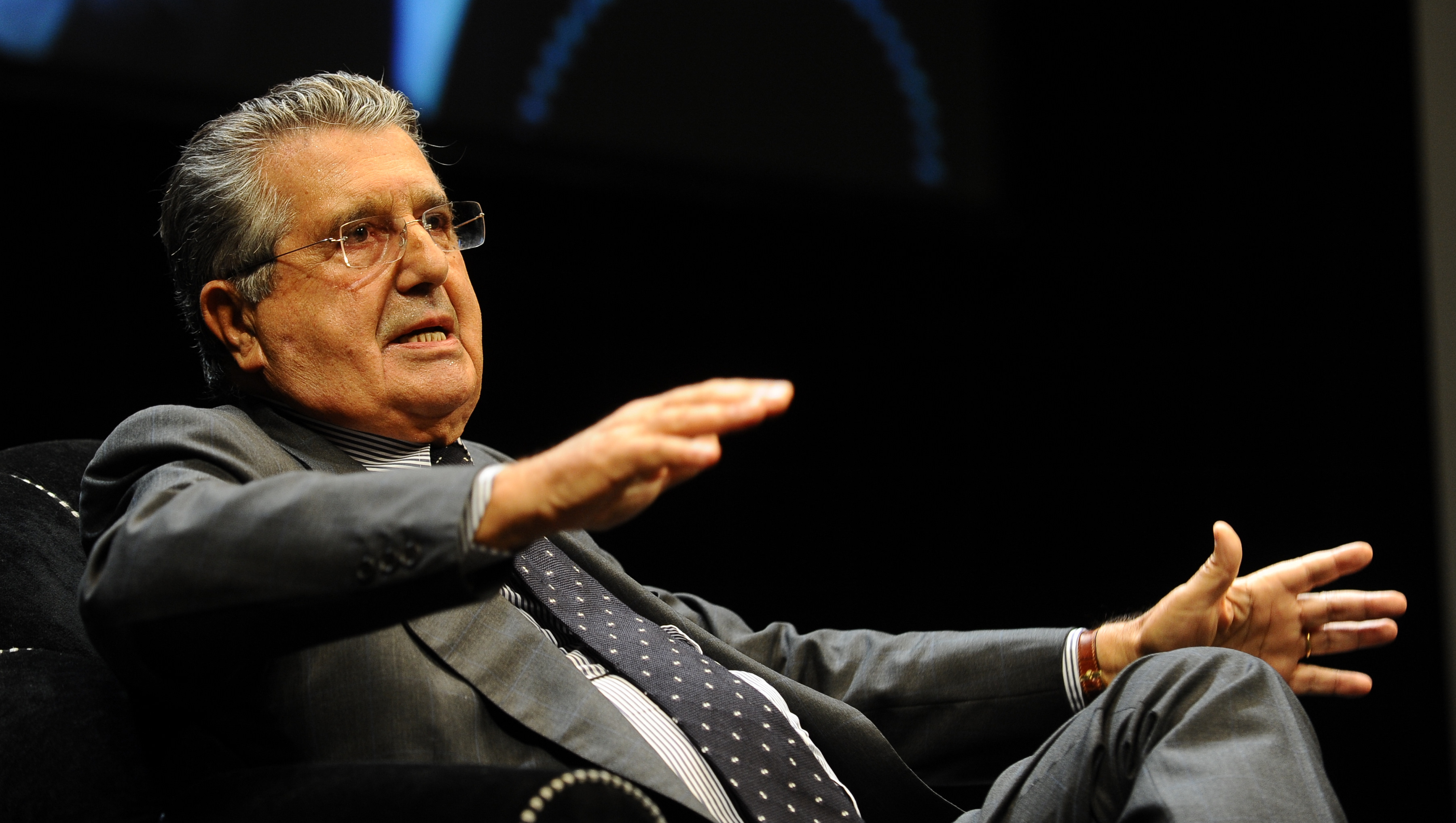
- Carlo De Benedetti at the Festival dell'Economia di Trento, 31 May 2012
- Born: 14 November 1934 (age 91); Turin, Italy
- Occupation: Industrialist
- Known for: Ex-CEO of Fiat, Olivetti, and CIR Group, ex-deputy chairman of Banco Ambrosiano, and ex-president of Gruppo Editoriale L'Espresso
- Height: 1.73 m (5 ft 8 in)

Carlo De Benedetti (born 14 November 1934) is an Italian industrialist, engineer, and publisher. He is both an Italian and naturalized Swiss citizen. He was awarded the Order of Merit for Labour by the Italian state in 1983, the Medaglia d'oro ai benemeriti della cultura e dell'arte (gold medal of culture and art) and the Legion d'Honneur in 1987.

De Benedetti is chairman of the Rodolfo De Benedetti Foundation (Fondazione Rodolfo Debenedetti) in Milan, which he founded in 1998 in memory of his father. It promotes research into economic policy decisions regarding the labour market and welfare systems in Europe. In 2020, De Benedetti spent €10 million setting up Domani, a new liberal newspaper headquartered in Rome.

== Early life ==
Born into a wealthy Jewish family on 14 November 1934, Carlo De Benedetti is the brother of Italian senator Franco Debenedetti, whose surname is different owing to a spelling error. In 1943, during the World War II, the De Benedetti family fled to Switzerland. After returning to Italy, he received a degree in electrical engineering from the Polytechnic University of Turin, and in 1959 began to work in his father's manufacturing business, the Compagnia Italiana Tubi Metallici Flessibili. He helped improve company profits consistently and in 1972 acquired the Gilardini company, of which he became president and CEO until 1976.

== Career ==
De Benedetti left Italy to return to Switzerland in 1975, owing to possible terrorist threats during the Anni di Piombo ("Years of Lead") period of Italian domestic terrorism. For a brief period from 4 May to 25 August 1976, he was appointed CEO of Fiat. According to De Benedetti, his resignation from Fiat was caused by his decision to lay off 65,000 workers, which was refused by Fiat head Gianni Agnelli; others say that he was suspected of trying to build up a takeover of power within the company, with the backing Swiss financial groups.

In November 1976, De Benedetti acquired the CIR Group, thereby also obtaining control of the national newspaper La Repubblica and the newsmagazine L'Espresso. In 1978, he became CEO of the Italian manufacturer Olivetti, where he remained until his resignation in 1996. As president of Olivetti, since 1983, he quickly and ruthlessly reorganized the company, switching its focus from mechanical typewriters to computers. In the 1980s, along with other leading business figures, he founded the European Round Table of Industrialists, of which he was vice president until 2004. In 1985, he became a member of the European Advisory Committee of the New York Stock Exchange.

In 1995, De Benedetti founded the telecommunications companies Omnitel and Infostrada. In 1997, he created the Gruppo Editoriale L'Espresso (L'Espresso Editorial Group), merging the L'Espresso and La Repubblica editorial groups. Carlo Caracciolo was appointed president of the group. De Benedetti assumed the presidency in 2006 after the death of Caracciolo. On 26 January 2009, at a press conference, De Benedetti announced his decision to retire from all his executive positions in the CIR Group, keeping at the request of the board of directors only the position of chairman of the Espresso Group. All the executive positions in the CIR Group were given to the then chief executive Rodolfo De Benedetti.

== Media businesses and politics ==
De Benedetti once controlled La Repubblica, Italy's main centre-left newspaper; L'Espresso, a major news magazine; and La Stampa, a newspaper published out of Turin. In 2012, he handed control of his family media company to his sons, who later sold it to the Agnelli-Elkann family against his wishes. In 2020, he founded Domani, a daily newspaper independent of political parties, to service liberal readers. The newspaper's ownership would eventually be transferred to a non-profit foundation.

De Benedetti has often been identified with the Italian centre-left. He had a long-standing feud with Silvio Berlusconi, and he once controlled the main centre-left-leaning Italian newspaper (La Repubblica) and newsmagazine (L'Espresso). He was called a "foe of Berlusconi" by The Wall Street Journal. In October 2005, De Benedetti reportedly offered Benjamin Netanyahu, then the Finance Minister of Israel, the position of Italian finance minister, which Netanyahu declined. De Benedetti later said it had been a joke. Ehud Gol, the Israeli ambassador to Italy, had introduced the men.

== Judicial affairs ==
=== Banco Ambrosiano ===
De Benedetti became deputy chairman of the Italian bank Banco Ambrosiano in 1981 by acquiring 2% of the capital; he left after only 61 days. In April 1992, De Benedetti and 32 other people were convicted of fraud by a Milan court in connection with the collapse of the bank. Benedetti was sentenced to six years and four months in prison; the sentence was in final instance overturned in April 1998 by Italy's Supreme Court of Cassation.

=== SME affair and Mondadori settlement ===
In 1985, Romano Prodi, then president of the state-owned IRI (Institute for Industrial Reconstruction), tried to sell the IRI share in SME (a former state-owned agency, later turned food industry conglomerate) to De Benedetti, who was then president of Buitoni (a food industry belonging to the CIR Group), for ₤497 billion. Other offers for SME included most notably one for a joint venture with Fininvest, a media group owned by entrepreneur and future Italian prime minister Silvio Berlusconi. The sale to De Benedetti was later blocked by the then Italian prime minister Bettino Craxi, and SME remained state-owned until almost 10 years later. De Benedetti brought IRI to court in an attempt to appeal the block; the court, presided over by judge Filippo Verde, denied his case in 1986. In 1995, Berlusconi and the lawyers Cesare Previti, and Attilio Pacifico were accused of having bribed Filippo Verde and Renato Squillante to fix the trial against De Benedetti.

According to the judges, as there was no evidence that the sentence of the Civil Court of Rome was bought, the defendants were acquitted of this charge; however, it was proved that judge Renato Squillante was "on the payroll" of Fininvest through Pacifico and Previti (crime of corruption in judicial acts committed but time-barred). Berlusconi was acquitted both of the corruption charge relating to the SME sentence and of the corruption charge relating to the cash payments made by Previti to Squillante (as recounted by Stefania Ariosto) and to the Orologio bank transfer of 1991. The Mondadori settlement was part of the Segrate War, a judicial-financial clash between De Benedetti and Berlusconi for the ownership of the Italian publishing house Arnoldo Mondadori Editore, which was won in court by Berlusconi. Another trial arose from the payment of bribes to obtain the award favourable to Berlusconi's side, and saw among the defendants Berlusconi himself and his closest collaborators, including Previti. This trial was merged in 2002 with the IMI/SIR trial. In 2013, the Supreme Court of Cassation sentenced in final instance Berlusconi's Fininvest to pay €494 million to De Benedetti's CIR Group.

=== Tangentopoli ===
In 1993, during the Mani Pulite (Clean Hands) political-corruption investigations, De Benedetti was arrested and admitted to having paid a ₤10 billion bribe to government parties in order to obtain a purchase order from Poste Italiane (the Italian postal service) for obsolete teleprinters and computers. In May 1993, he was officially put under investigation but never went to trial for this episode, the statute of limitations having expired.

== Personal life ==
From his first marriage in 1959 with Mita Crosetti, De Beneddetti had three children: Rodolfo, married to the writer Emmanuelle de Villepin; Marco, married to the journalist Paola Ferrari; Edoardo, married to Ilgi Suna Erel. In 1997, De Benedetti married the actress Silvia Monti, with whom he moved to Lugano in Switzerland. In 2009, he acquired Swiss citizenship, citing emotional reasons. Although he declared his intent to continue paying taxes in Italy, he was criticized for having made this choice for tax reasons. De Benedetti responded that he has always paid taxes in Italy. In 2010, he moved his civil residence to Dogliani, in the Piedmont region in Italy. In 2015, he announced that he had moved his registered residence and tax domicile to St. Moritz in Switzerland.

== Honours ==
- Knight of the Order of Merit for Labour, 1983
- Italian Order of Merit for Culture and Art Golden medal, 1987.
- Officer of the Legion of Honour, 1987.
- Member of the Royal Swedish Academy of Engineering Sciences, 1987.
- Decoration of Honour for Services to the Republic of Austria Silver medal, 2006.
