= Alessandro Pansa =

Italian business executive

Alessandro Pansa (Mortara, June 22, 1962 – November 11, 2017) was an Italian business executive.

== Biography ==
Degree in political economy at Bocconi University in Milan, in which he also specialized in financial economics and monetary union. He also attended the Business Administration Graduate School at New York University.

Pansa began his career at Credito Italiano SpA and Euromobiliare SpA. He then became senior partner at Vitale Borghesi & C., where he oversaw some M&A and stock market deals like the flotation of Mondadori, the public tender offer of the Credito Romagnolo by Credito Italiano.

He was also involved in corporate finance transactions on behalf of Finmeccanica, Enel, Wind, Poste Italiane, Ferrovie dello Stato SpA and the Italian Ministry of Treasury. Subsequently, he was appointed managing director and partner of Lazard, where he coordinated the privatization and flotation of Finmeccanica on behalf of the Treasury.

He joined Finmeccanica in 2001 as chief financial officer. He became co-general manager in 2004, chief operating officer in May 2011 as well as chief financial officer. In February 2013 Finmeccanica named Alessandro Pansa as its new chief executive officer.

He was CEO and general manager in Finmeccanica Group until 15 May 2014.

Pansa was member of the board of Feltrinelli Editore SpA and the Italian SpA Strategic Fund. He was also a member of the Council for Relations between Italy and the US and the Aspen Institute.

From 2006 to 2017 he was professor of finance at the LUISS University of Rome. He authored articles and essays on economic and financial.

He died on November 11, 2017, after heart attack
