= Counter Information =

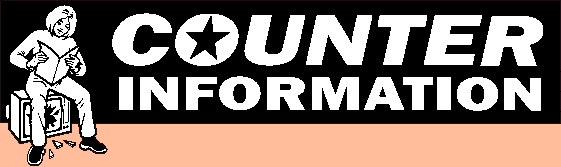
- Type: News sheet
- Launched: 1984
- Ceased publication: 2004
- Political alignment: Class-struggle anarchism
- Language: English
- Headquarters: Edinburgh
- Country: Scotland, United Kingdom
- Website: counterinfo.org.uk

Counter Information was a revolutionary anarchist news sheet produced by groups in Edinburgh, Glasgow and Leeds from 1984 to 2004.

== Establishment ==
Counter Information was revolutionary anarchist news sheet established in 1984, in the Scottish capital of Edinburgh, with the intention of covering the 1984–1985 United Kingdom miners' strike. By the following year, its scope had broadened to coverage of industrial disputes in various different economic sectors, with labour activists providing primary accounts of class conflict in their workplaces. The news sheet was produced by a network of three publishing collectives, located in Edinburgh, Glasgow and Leeds. The Edinburgh collective was hosted by the Autonomous Centre of Edinburgh (ACE). Each quarterly issue of the news sheet carried 2-4 pages, printed on A4 paper, and circulated up to 12,000 copies. Counter Information often invited its readers to participate in the magazine's writing and editing.

== Publication process ==
The quarterly issue of Counter Information was put together over 6 weeks, during which 3 editorial meetings and 1 layout meeting would oversee its writing, editing and publishing. Meetings were open to all members of the publishing collective and a process of consensus decision-making was used to provide a collective response to issues. In the first meeting, the collective would collect primary and secondary sources, selecting specific items from the collected accounts based on what the collective thought would be most significant for the widest range of people to know about. This required accounts of localised actions to be framed in the context of a larger movement with broader consequences, rather than providing coverage to any protest action. The main struggles the collective sought to cover received longer articles, each between 350 and 500 words, and were written by a collective member with a direct connection to the subject.

In the second editorial meeting, the collective decided on the number of smaller articles to include, prepared its feature articles if they were ready by this time, and reviewed any updates they had received since the previous meeting. In the third editorial meeting, agreed-upon articles for the issue were written, typed up and copy-edited. Any structural and content changes made were agreed upon collectively and the feature articles were given the most in-depth discussion, while smaller articles were only discussed if the issue of their inclusion was specifically raised by a collective member. At the end of the 6 week cycle, collective members met for the layout meeting, which often included last-minute editorial adjustments. Over the course of most of the day, the issue was laid out and put together by three editors, while any articles yet to be provided were hastily written.

== Specific stories covered ==
In 1994, Counter Information covered the attempted eviction of ACE and its subsequent occupation by anti-eviction activists. In December 1994, Counter Information reported that 80 activists had occupied ACE and attempted to resist the eviction for over 8 hours, but that police were ultimately successful in ending the occupation and arrested 21 activists. Counter Information criticised Edinburgh City Council for attempting to destroy the ACE, which had become a centre for grassroots activism and direct action in the Scottish capital. Despite the eviction, the core group that organised the ACE continued their work publishing Counter Information in Edinburgh. After ACE was re-opened in 1997, it once again provided a headquarters for the Edinburgh publishing collective of Counter Information.

== Bibliography ==
- Atton, Chris (2003). "Infoshops in the Shadow of the State". In Couldry, Nick; Curran, James (eds.). Contesting Media Power: Alternative Media in a Networked World. Rowman & Littlefield. pp. 57–69. ISBN 9780742523852.
- Cottle, Simon (2003). "Counter Information". Media Organization and Production. SAGE Publications. pp. 48–49. ISBN 978-1-4129-3172-4.
- Franks, Benjamin (2003). "The Direct Action Ethic". Anarchist Studies. 11 (1): 13–41. ISSN 0967-3393.
