= Sandro Magister =

Italian journalist (born 1943)

- Born: Alessandro Magiste; 2 October 1943 (age 82); Busto Arsizio, Italy
- Education: Theological Faculty of Milan and at the Catholic University of the Sacred Heart, theology, philosophy, and history
- Occupations: Journalist; author
- Employer: L'espresso
- Spouse: Anna
- Relatives: Two daughters
- Website: http://magister.blogautore.espresso.repubblica.it

Sandro Magister (born 2 October 1943) is an Italian journalist who writes for the magazine L'espresso.

Magister specializes in religious news, in particular on the Catholic Church and the Vatican. He has written two books on the political history of the Italian episcopate: "Italian Church: Vatican Politics and Italy 1943-1978" and "Extraparliamentary Church: The Triumph of the Pulpit". He also manages the website Chiesa on the topic of modern ecclesiastical affairs.

Some days before its official publication on 18 June 2015, Sandro Magister was accused of violating an embargo by publishing parts of the encyclical Laudato si, and was deprived of accreditation to the Vatican press room as a result, on 16 June 2015. Magister's response was that the document was an early draft not covered by the embargo, obtained by his editor who made the decision to publish; he had written merely an introduction.

He, his wife Anna, and their two daughters live in Rome.
