= La Repubblica =

Italian daily newspaper

la Repubblica

- Front page, 7 November 2007
- Type: Daily newspaper
- Format: Berliner
- Owner: GEDI Gruppo Editoriale
- Editor: Mario Orfeo
- Deputy editor: Stefania Aloia; Carlo Bonini; Stefano Cappellini; Emanuele Farneti (ad personam); Walter Galbiati
- Founded: 14 January 1976; 50 years ago
- Political alignment: Progressivism; Social liberalism
- Language: Italian
- Headquarters: Rome, Italy
- Country: Italy
- Circulation: 301,565 (May 2014)
- Sister newspapers: La Stampa (since 2017)
- ISSN: 0390-1076
- OCLC number: 642673598
- Website: www.repubblica.it

la Repubblica (Italian: [la reˈpubblika]; English: "the Republic") is an Italian daily general-interest newspaper with an average circulation of 151,309 copies in May 2023. It was founded in 1976 in Rome by Gruppo Editoriale L'Espresso (now known as GEDI Gruppo Editoriale) and led by Eugenio Scalfari, Carlo Caracciolo, and Arnoldo Mondadori Editore as a leftist newspaper, which proclaimed itself a "newspaper-party" (giornale-partito). During the early years of la Repubblica, its political views and readership ranged from the reformist left to the extraparliamentary left. Into the 21st century, it is identified with centre-left politics, and was known for its anti-Berlusconism, and Silvio Berlusconi's personal scorn for the paper.

In April 2020, the paper was acquired by the GEDI Gruppo Editoriale of John Elkann and the Agnelli family, who is also the founder and owner of La Stampa. Maurizio Molinari, the then editor of La Stampa, was appointed la Repubblica's editor in place of Carlo Verdelli; this prompted the resignation of several journalists opposed to this change. Under Molinari, it took a moderate line, and tried to go beyond the political left and right, and against populism. At the same time, because "information is essential to support and animate a widespread laboratory of ideas on what economic justice means today", it was concerned about economic and social inequalities. Under Molinari, it equated work on paper to digital work and followed the digital first theory. La Repubblica and Corriere della Sera are known for their fact-checking. Alongside Corriere della Sera, La Stampa, Il Sole 24 Ore, and Il Messaggero, it is one of the main national newspapers in Italy.

== History ==
=== Foundation ===
la Repubblica was founded by Eugenio Scalfari, previously director of the weekly magazine L'Espresso. The publisher Carlo Caracciolo and Mondadori had invested 2.3 billion lire (half each) and a break-even point was calculated at 150,000 copies. Scalfari invited a few trusted colleagues like Gianni Rocca, then Giorgio Bocca, Sandro Viola, Mario Pirani, Miriam Mafai, Barbara Spinelli, Natalia Aspesi, and Giuseppe Turani. The cartoons were the prerogative of Giorgio Forattini until 1999.

=== Early years ===
The newspaper first went on sale on 14 January 1976. It was presented as the first Italian tabloid, with some sections such as sports and business intentionally left out. When it was founded, it was intended to be a second newspaper, with only major news at the national level, to an audience that has already read a local newspaper. It was composed of 20 pages and was published from Tuesday to Sunday. The paper defined itself as a "newspaper-party" (giornale-partito) in its initial stage.

During the first two years, it built up a core-audience identified as members of the centre-left and the Italian Communist Party (PCI). In 1977, Scalfari decided to cater to the university student movement, so la Repubblica began its expansion. The strength of the newspaper lay particularly in the editorial comments section, which was always incisive and thought-provoking. In the meantime, Giampaolo Pansa from Corriere della Sera became the deputy director.

=== Rise to prominence ===
Cover of Il Venerdì featuring Carla Bruni

In early 1978, average sales amounted to 114,000 copies. During the 55 days of the Aldo Moro kidnapping, la Repubblica backed the policy of hardline non-negotiation while reporting on the pro-negotiation approach led by Bettino Craxi of the Italian Socialist Party (PSI). The paper's stance proved popular, and by the end of the year its daily sales reached 140,000 copies. In 1979, with an average print run of 180,000 copies, it achieved a break-even point. The size of the newspaper increased with page count growing from 20 to 24. The newspaper decided to cover sports for the first time and veteran reporter Gianni Brera was added. From 1979 to 1994, Glauco Benigni was the International Media Editor further reaffirming the expansion and popularity of the paper overseas, covering international Film Festivals and major events like U.S. Mission rocket launches.

In 1981, Corriere della Sera was hit by a scandal when chief editor Franco Di Bella was outed as a member of the secret masonic lodge Propaganda Due (P2). This allowed la Repubblica to win extra readers and recruit a number of prestigious commentators, such as Enzo Biagi and Alberto Ronchey from Corriere della Sera. Aiming to gain top circulation in Italy, chief editor Scalfari launched new reader-friendly initiatives. There were now 40 pages, including news sections, entertainment, and sport. The newspaper was pitched as an omnibus newspaper, namely a paper catering to all types of readers. Politically, while the paper kept backing the progressive left, its approach to governmental parties changed; its traditional opposition to Craxi's line was coupled with overtures to Ciriaco De Mita, one of the leading figures of the left wing of the Christian Democracy party. This seemed to pay off as in 1985 la Repubblica sold an average of 373,000 copies per day.

1986 marked the newspaper's tenth birthday. A special issue was released in celebration, Dieci anni 1976/1985 ("Ten Years 1976/1985"), consisting of ten files in coated paper, one per each year, with the re-issuing of many original articles. The launch was backed by a successful advertising campaign featuring a young university student seen purchasing la Repubblica. Ten years later, the same student was pictured as an adult; he is holding the same newspaper but in the meantime he worked his way up to an important managerial position in a large company. The same year saw the launch of weekly financial supplement, Affari & finanza, edited by Giuseppe Turani. la Repubblica continued the game of catch up with Corriere della Sera, and in December 1986 managed to overtake their rivals.

In 1987, la Repubblica launched a prize competition called Portfolio, a type of stock market-based lottery. Readers were encouraged to buy the newspaper daily in order to check share value. The prize turned out to cost more than the supplements earned, the latter increasing sales for one or two days a week only. la Repubblica expanded by almost 200,000 copies within three months, stretching to a total daily average of nearly 700,000. la Repubblica and Corriere della Sera were Italy's two best-selling newspapers. The 1988 circulation of the paper was 730,000 copies, making it the most read newspaper in Italy. At the end of the 1980s, the paper reached a circulation of 800,000 copies; by 2015, the paper had the country's second highest circulation, after Corriere della Sera, at about 275,000 copies. Corriere della Sera hit back with a free Saturday magazine and la Repubblica reciprocated with their own magazine, Venerdì, launched on 16 October 1987, the same day as Affari & Finanza. The via Solferino publishing group did not reclaim the top spot for two years.

=== Guerra di Segrate ("Segrate War") ===
At the end of the 1980s, believing that a stronger financial support was needed for the growth of the group, Carlo Caracciolo and Eugenio Scalfari (main shareholders of the Espresso group) sold all their shares to Carlo De Benedetti. Already a major shareholder of Mondadori, Benedetti took the Espresso group together with the Milan publisher, with the goal of becoming the main shareholder, buying the stock of Arnoldo Mondadori's heirs. Silvio Berlusconi prevented it, starting the Segrate War (from the town of Segrate, near Milan, where the Mondadori main office is located. In 1991, after more than two years of legal and financial battles, the struggle was ended by the entrepreneur Giuseppe Ciarrapico on behalf of the prime minister of the time, Giulio Andreotti, who persuaded De Benedetti and Berlusconi to split the Grande Mondadori. De Benedetti received la Repubblica, L'Espresso, and some local newspapers, while Berlusconi received Mondadori minus the newspapers. The controversial operation was the main point of a lawsuit in which Berlusconi was charged with corruption of legal proceedings. This lawsuit became famous as the Lodo Mondadori ("Mondadori arbitration award"). A verdict on 3 October 2009 by the Causa Civile (Civil Court of Milan) pronounced that Berlusconi's Fininvest had to compensate the De Benedetti's CIR €750 million for financial losses due to perdita di chance ("lost opportunities") from the Lodo Mondadori decision.

In the following years, new publishing projects were added. la Repubblica, which up to then was not published on Monday, bought Lunedì di Repubblica for 50 million lire. This was a satirical magazine and the first real fake newspaper; it was published by Vincenzo Sparagna, author of Frigidaire. Gruppo Editoriale L'Espresso at first sued Sparagna for plagiarism but lost when the court acknowledged Lunedì di Repubblica as an original masthead. The launch occurred on 10 January 1994; in this period, the newspaper had an average circulation of 660,000 copies. 1995, besides being the year of the introduction of the supplements Musica! Rock & altro and Salute, was the year of a graphical change as colour was introduced on the first page and in advertisements. In May 1996, after twenty years, Eugenio Scalfari resigned as editor-in-chief but remained an important contributor to the newspaper. He was succeeded by Ezio Mauro. That same year, the weekly women's supplement D – la Repubblica delle donne ("D – The Republic of Women") was launched.

=== After Eugenio Scalfari ===
On 5 April 1996, the paper launched its website as a collaborative effort with Digital and Interbusiness (a unit of Telecom Italia), as an online trial version of the newspaper, created for the 1996 Italian general election held on 21 April. In August 1996, Mauro began a project, Repubblica – lavori in corso ("Repubblica – work in progress"), with the objective of testing an on-line edition. The project was coordinated by Vittorio Zambardino, Gualtiero Pierce, and Ernesto Assante, with technical direction by Alessandro Canepa.

On 14 January 1997, the online version of the newspaper, Repubblica.it, was launched. In May 2007, the paper's website was listed 11th among the top 30 brands of the month in Italy, with almost 5 million unique visitors, and being the first daily newspaper ahead of Corriere della Sera; during the same month, the paper had sold about 566,000 copies compared to the circa 594,000 copies of Corriere della Sera. By October 2007, it had become the main Italian information website, with over 10.6 million visitors, and in 2010 was the tenth most visited website in the country, ahead of Google, Yahoo!, Facebook, YouTube, and MSN.

In 2004, through a gradual process, the newspaper introduced colour in every page. This decision forced the whole Italian newspaper market to adopt similar measures. On 19 October 2007, the newspaper's graphics and layout were renovated. la Repubblica split in two newspapers: one dedicated to the news and the other (called R2) to analysis of current events. On 20 November 2007, the newspaper revealed wiretapping transcripts between certain RAI and Mediaset directors, aimed at modifying some parts of the TV scheduling of 2005 regarding the death of Pope John Paul II and the 2005 Italian regional elections.

In August 2009, Berlusconi sued the newspaper, after it published ten questions addressed to him, which he refused to answer on the grounds that they were "rhetorical, defamatory, and discrediting". Asking for €1 million in damages, the lawsuit also cited a 6 August 2009 article in which the paper described him as blackmailable, and was not limited to Italy, as his lawyer sued British, French, and Spanish outlets for publishing news about his personal life. In turn, the then opposition led by the Democratic Party asked Berlusconi to sue all of them. Mauro, one of the authors of the contested articles, commented: "Unable to answer, except with a lie, Silvio Berlusconi has decided to bring the ten questions of [la] Repubblica to court, thus covering up – at least in Italy – the public shame of private behavior which is at the centre of an international scandal and persecutes him politically. It is the first time, in the memory of a free country, that a politician sues the questions that are addressed to him."

In September 2011, Rome's civil court rejected Berlusconi's damage claims on the grounds that the ten questions "constitute the legitimate exercise of the right to criticize and lawful manifestation of the freedom of thought and opinion guaranteed by Article 21 of the Constitution". Berlusconi had insulted the paper's journalists and invited industrialists to boycott advertising in la Repubblica. The paper described it as an "unprecedented case of a political leader denouncing questions because he cannot answer". The sentence judged the ten questions to be "founded on a solid core of truthfulness ... civil and correct". The sentence concluded that "in a democratic country it is the right and duty of the press to ask those who hold political and government offices to account and explain their behavior" so that citizens can judge the public figure "not only on the carried out, but also with reference to its ethical heritage and the consistency of its behaviour".

Following the purchase of GEDI group by John Elkann, Carlo Verdelli was removed from his post as editor and replaced by Maurizio Molinari in April 2020. Maurizio Scanavino was put at the executive role, among other changes of roles. The appointment of Molinari and the role of Elkann were criticized, and led to several journalists to resign, and the paper's former editor Carlo De Benedetti to found the Domani newspaper. Under Molinari, la Repubblica underwent several and significant changes, particularly on digital. In November 2021, both la Repubblica and La Stampa, which is also owned by Elkann's group, underwent readership losses despite Elkann's ambition plans to turn around the paper's deficits. In July 2022, Scalfari died.

In July 2023, there was a classist controversy about an article written for the paper by Elkann's father, Alain Elkann, who compared the behavior of young people he sat next to on a train to that of Landsknecht. Further controversy was caused by the young Elkann's article for La Stampa. Molinari refused to publish a letter in which the paper's journalists distanced themselves from the elder Elkann but said that he understood their reasoning.

In September 2024 Maurizio Molinari was replaced by Mario Orfeo.

== Political position ==
The newspaper was founded as a left-wing, reformist, and secularist paper. The newspaper played a role in the evolution of Europeanism and the Italian political left from 1984 to 1992. It held a critical line towards the former prime minister Silvio Berlusconi, especially criticizing his conflict of interest as both an entrepreneur and politician. Scalfari criticized Berlusconi's television channels and urged an investigation into the origins of his fortune. The paper also used to be known for its critical stand vis-à-vis the Catholic Church, a position that changed after the onset of the papacy of Pope Francis, who remembered Scalfari upon his death as a "laical friend". In 2004, Angelo Agostini categorized it as the agenda daily (quotidiano-agenda), in contrast to the institution daily (quotidiano-istituzione) like Corriere della Sera and La Stampa, and the activist daily (quotidiano-attivista) like Il Foglio, Libero, and l'Unità. Compared to one of its competitors, Corriere della Sera, a representative of the moderate bourgeoisie, la Repubblica maintains a centre-left, progressive orientation.

After the acquisition of the paper by John Elkann in April 2020, Maurizio Molinari was appointed the new paper's editor, in a move that saw several changes of position that were criticized, and that saw Molinari of La Stampa, which is also owned by Elkann's GEDI group, replacing Carlo Verdelli. Scalfari warned the paper not to move away from its liberal-socialist positions, which he described thusly: "I have always believed in a liberal socialism, capable of uniting equality and reformism ... at the forefront in guiding the country and Europe in this direction." Critics described the Molinari appointment as the de-Scalfarization of the paper. This prompted journalists like Enrico Deaglio, Pino Corrias, and Gad Lerner to end their cooperation with the paper. Carlo De Benedetti, a former editor of the paper, also protested the decision to appoint Molinari as the paper's editor. In May 2020, De Benedetti announced the foundation of a new newspaper called Domani.

Under Molinari, the paper took a moderate line. In his first editorial published on 25 April 2020, Molinari indicated the way to enhance both the paper and online versions of the paper, which was suffering losses in readership. He proclaimed the need to fight populism and the old and new inequalities caused by the COVID-19 pandemic. In July 2020, he said: "We claim to address the crucial issues of this time. No longer dividing the world into the old right–left categories, but debating the environment, social inequalities, digital rights. [la] Repubblica is the gymnasium of ideas where it is possible to address these topics. It must do so by hosting multiple opinions, even if they are conflicting." Into the 2022 Italian general election, the paper under Molinari was opposed to Giorgia Meloni's politics. Elkann asked Molinari to moderate the paper's anti-Melonism to keep in line with the Agnelli family's tradition of supporting the Italian government, whether from the political left or right; Meloni's party and coalition were widely seen as the favourite to lead the next Italian government. He referenced a quote from his grandfather, Gianni Agnelli, who used to say: "We are governmental and institutional by definition."

== Supplements and features ==
=== In publication ===
- Affari & Finanza (since 1986)
- D la Repubblica (since 1996)
- Design (since 2011)
- Door (since 2023)
- Motore
- Robinson (since 2016)
- U la Repubblica (since 2024)
- Il Venerdì di Repubblica (since 1987)

=== Defunct ===
- D Lui
- L'Espresso (now published by BFC Media)
- Il Lavoro, formerly a Genoese socialist newspaper, nowadays a feature published only in the local Ligurian edition
- The New York Times, a supplement which featured articles from The New York Times
- R7

== Editorial staff ==
=== Editors ===
- 1976–1996: Eugenio Scalfari
- 1996–2016: Ezio Mauro
- 2016–2019: Mario Calabresi
- 2019–2020: Carlo Verdelli
- 2020–2024: Maurizio Molinari
- 2024–present: Mario Orfeo

=== Journalists ===
- Natalia Aspesi
- Emanuela Audisio
- Corrado Augias
- Glauco Benigni
- Edmondo Berselli
- Giorgio Bocca
- Tito Boeri
- Attilio Bolzoni
- Carlo Bonini
- Raimondo Bultrini
- Mario Calabresi
- Filippo Ceccarelli
- Pietro Citati
- Pino Corrias
- Gianni Clerici
- Leonardo Coen
- Franco Cordero
- Maurizio Crosetti
- Giuseppe D'Avanzo
- Concita De Gregorio
- Ilvo Diamanti
- Emanuele Farneti
- Khaled Fouad Allam
- Massimo Giannini
- Renzo Guolo
- Alessandra Longo
- Gad Lerner
- Miriam Mafai
- Curzio Maltese
- Daniele Mastrogiacomo
- Francesco Merlo
- Sebastiano Messina
- Gianni Mura
- Joaquín Navarro-Valls
- Marino Niola
- Piero Ottone
- Alessandro Penati
- Mario Perniola
- Carlo Petrini
- Mario Pirani
- Franco Quadri
- Adriano Prosperi
- Federico Rampini
- Guido Rampoldi
- Massimo Riva
- Stefano Rodotà
- Gabriele Romagnoli
- Paolo Rumiz
- Roberto Saviano
- Eugenio Scalfari
- Aldo Schiavone
- Michele Serra
- Adriano Sofri
- Luigi Spaventa
- Alberto Statera
- Marco Travaglio
- Giuseppe Turani
- Nadia Urbinati
- Giovanni Valentini
- Bernardo Valli
- Gianni Vernetti
- Sandro Viola
- Vittorio Zucconi

== Previous editorial staff ==
- Alberto Arbasino
- Gianni Brera
- Mario Calabresi
- Furio Colombo
- Concita De Gregorio
- Giorgio Dell'Arti
- Paolo Filo della Torre
- Mino Fuccillo
- Enzo Golino
- Paolo Guzzanti
- Giampaolo Pansa
- Gianni Rocca
- Enzo Siciliano
- Tiziano Terzani

=== Cartoonists ===
- Francesco Tullio Altan
- Massimo Bucchi
- Ellekappa
- Giorgio Forattini (until 1999)

== Circulation ==
The circulation of a newspaper is obtained, according to the criteria of Press Circulation Assessments (ADS), from the sum of: Total Paid + Total Free + Foreign Circulation + Bulk Sales.

Since 2021, ADS has abandoned the distinction between paper copy and digital copy, which has been replaced by the distinction between "individual sales" (copies paid for by the buyer) and "multiple sales" (copies paid for by third parties). With the new calculation method, circulation always exceeds print run.

Year	Average daily copies sold
2014	301,565
2013	323,469
2009	504,098
2008	518,907
2007	580,966
2006	588,275
2005	587,268
2004	586,419
2003	581,102
2002	579,269
2001	574,717
2000	566,811
1999	562,494
1998	562,857
1997	594,213
1996	575,447

== See also ==
- List of newspapers in Italy
- Mass media in Italy
- Repubblica TV
