= Curzio Maltese =

Italian journalist and politician (1959–2023)

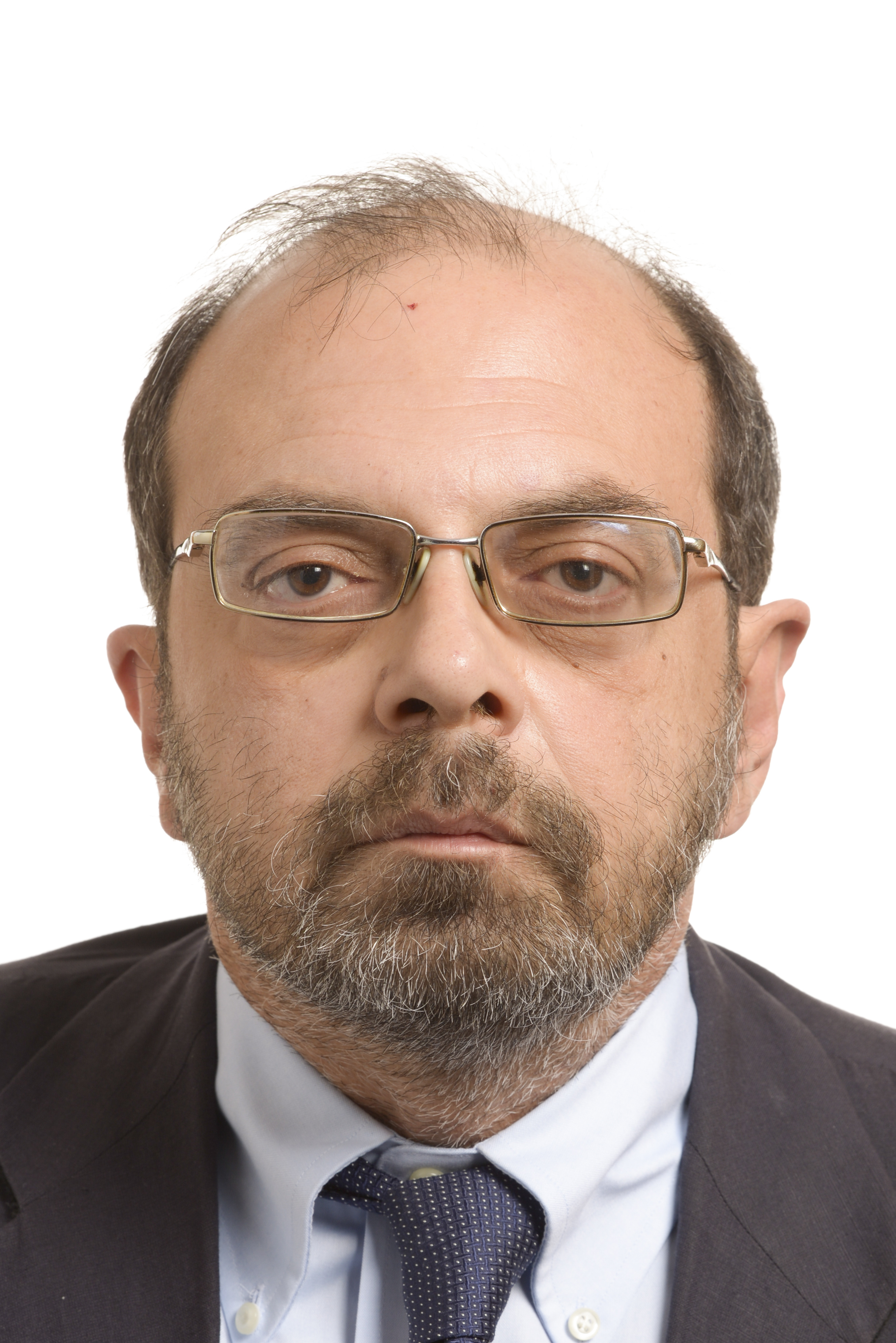

Member of the European Parliament
- In office 1 July 2014 – 2 July 2019
- Constituency: North-West Italy

Personal details
- Born: 30 March 1959 Milan, Lombardy, Italy
- Died: 26 February 2023 (aged 63) Milan, Lombardy, Italy
- Party: Italian Left
- Education: University of Milan
- Profession: Journalist

Curzio Maltese (30 March 1959 – 26 February 2023) was an Italian journalist and politician.

== Biography ==
Maltese was born in Milan and raised in Sesto San Giovanni, and the brother of RAI sports journalist Cinzia Maltese. After working at factories and on independent radio, he became a journalist.

Maltese started reporting on sports and news for the newspapers La Gazzetta dello Sport, La Stampa, and La Notte. He was a columnist for the newspaper La Repubblica and the weekly newspaper Il Sabato di Repubblica, where he also covered television and film criticism.

In 2014, he ran for the European elections as top candidate in the northwest Italian constituency for The Other Europe list, in support of Alexīs Tsipras as President of the European Commission, obtaining 31,980 preferences. Despite being the first of the unelected on his list, he entered the European Parliament following the renunciation of Moni Ovadia and sat in the GUE/NGL group. In 2015, he entered the national presidency of Left Ecology Freedom, the party led by Nichi Vendola. In 2017, he was on the promoting committee of the Italian Left.

He died on the 26th of February 2023, of Cancer
