= L'Espresso =

Weekly Italian magazine

- L'Espresso, 10 April 2026
- Editor-in-Chief: Alessandro Mauro Rossi
- Former editors: Arrigo Benedetti, Eugenio Scalfari, Daniela Hamaui, Bruno Manfellotto, Luigi Vicinanza, Tommaso Cerno
- Categories: News magazine
- Frequency: Weekly
- Circulation: 199,710 (2019)
- Founded: 1955; 71 years ago
- Company: BFC Media
- Country: Italy
- Based in: Rome
- Language: Italian
- Website: espresso.repubblica.it
- ISSN: 0423-4243

L'Espresso (Italian: [leˈsprɛsso]) is an Italian progressive weekly news magazine. It is one of the two most prominent Italian weeklies; the other is the conservative magazine Panorama. Since 2022, it has been published by BFC Media. From 7 August 2016 to 10 September 2023, it was published on Sundays in mandatory combination with the newspaper la Repubblica.

== History and profile ==
One of Italy's foremost news magazines, L'Espresso was founded in Rome, Italy, as a weekly magazine in October 1955, by the N.E.R. (Nuove Edizioni Romane) publishing house of Carlo Caracciolo and the progressive industrialist Adriano Olivetti, manufacturer of Olivetti typewriters. Its chief editors were Arrigo Benedetti and Eugenio Scalfari. L'Espresso was characterized from the beginning by aggressive investigative journalism strongly focused on corruption and clientelism within the Christian Democracy ruling party of post-war Italy. In the 1950s, it uncovered major scandals in the health and housing industries. This made the main shareholder Olivetti unpopular with the ministries and large companies that were the primary customers of his main business. In 1956, with the magazine losing money, Olivetti gave a majority of shares to Caracciolo. De Benedetti and Scalfari entered as major shareholders as well.

The experienced De Benedetti, who had directed the news magazine L'Europeo (1945–1954), was editor-in-chief until 1963, when he handed the position over to Scalfari. At the time the average circulation reached 70,000 copies. In 1968, Scalfari was elected to the Italian Chamber of Deputies (1968–1972) and handed over editorship to Gianni Corbi. The magazine's original format was that of large newspaper; it was converted into a small glossy format in 1974. In 1965, it introduced colour printing for photos, text, and adverts. In 1975, the publishing company N.E.R. changed its corporate title to Editoriale L'Espresso; circulation at the time exceeded 300,000 copies. In January 1976, the Gruppo Editoriale L'Espresso also launched the daily newspaper la Repubblica, with Scalfari as editor-in-chief, in a joint venture with Arnoldo Mondadori Editore.

In 1967, L'Espresso revealed the attempted 1964 coup d'état by General Giovanni de Lorenzo that became known as Piano Solo. In 1976, it conducted a strong campaign against the then Italian president Giovanni Leone for his alleged involvement in the Lockheed scandal. During the 1970s and 1980s, it strongly supported the campaigns for divorce and abortion. From the mid-1970s onwards, a fierce competition developed with Italy's other major news magazine, Panorama, founded in 1962. The rivalry increased dramatically in the early 1990s, when Silvio Berlusconi—already controlling Panorama—attempted to absorb L'Espresso as well. The clash between Berlusconi and Carlo De Benedetti over the control of the Mondadori Group resulted in a break-up of assets, leading to the creation of the Espresso Group in its current form, with the CIR Group as majority shareholder.

Renowned journalists and writers who worked for L'Espresso include Giorgio Bocca, Umberto Eco, Giampaolo Pansa, Enzo Biagi, Michele Serra, Marco Travaglio, Roberto Saviano, Naomi Klein, and Jeremy Rifkin. In 2002, Daniela Hamaui was appointed editor-in-chief of the weekly, becoming the first woman to hold the post. L'Espresso is based in Rome but its business and finance newsroom is in Milan, now under Gruppo Editoriale L'Espresso property. The editor is Bruno Manfellotto. L'Espresso has a website with news and blogs. In May 2016, L'Espresso set up a secure platform based on GlobaLeaks technology to collect testimonials about torture and human rights abuse from Egyptian whistleblowers, and to seek justice for Giulio Regeni and for every Regeni in Egypt.

In November 2023, L'Espresso joined with the International Consortium of Investigative Journalists, Paper Trail Media, and 69 media partners including Distributed Denial of Secrets and the Organized Crime and Corruption Reporting Project (OCCRP), and more than 270 journalists in 55 countries and territories, to produce the "Cyprus Confidential" report on the financial network which supports the regime of Vladimir Putin, mostly with connections to Cyprus, and showed Cyprus to have strong links with high-up figures in the Kremlin, some of whom have been sanctioned. Government officials, including Cyprus president Nikos Christodoulides, as well as European lawmakers, began responding to the investigation's findings in less than 24 hours, calling for reforms and launching probes.

== Open letter to L'Espresso on the Pinelli case ==
The open letter to L'Espresso on the Pinelli case, also mentioned as an appeal or manifesto against Commissioner Luigi Calabresi, is a document published on 13 June 1971 by the weekly L'Espresso, with which numerous politicians, journalists, and intellectuals asked for the dismissal of some officials, believed to be the authors of serious omissions and negligence in ascertaining responsibility for the death of Giuseppe Pinelli, who fell from a window while he was in custody at the Milan police as part of the investigations into the Piazza Fontana bombing conducted by Commissioner Calabresi, who slanderously indicated him as responsible. On 10 June 1971, the letter was initially signed by ten signatories: Marino Berengo, Anna Maria Brizio, Elvio Fachinelli, Lucio Gambi, Giulio A. Maccacaro, Cesare Musatti, Enzo Paci, Carlo Salinari, Vladimiro Scatturin, and Mario Spinella. The open letter was published in the weekly L'Espresso on 13 June 1971 on the sidelines of an article by Camilla Cederna entitled "Twists and turns of karate. The latest incredible developments of the Pinelli case". The title was inspired by the hypothesis, which emerged from some early rumors about the wounds found on Pinelli's body and supported by Lotta Continua headed by Adriano Sofri and other left-wing extra-parliamentary circles, that Pinelli's defenestration was caused by a karate blow. In the following weeks, from 20 to 27 June 1971, the letter was republished, with the support of 757 signatures which included Gae Aulenti, Marco Bellocchio, Bernardo Bertolucci, Tinto Brass, Liliana Cavani, Toni Negri, Eugenio Scalfari, and Oliviero Toscani.

== Circulation ==
L'Espresso's circulation was 300,057 copies in 1984, and rose to 400,334 copies in 2007, making it the fourth best-selling news magazine in Italy. It was 334,260 copies in 2010, 239,000 in 2013, based on the report of the Gruppo Editoriale L'Espresso, and 195,787 in June 2014.

== Editors ==
- Arrigo Benedetti (1955–1963)
- Eugenio Scalfari (1963–1968)
- Gianni Corbi (1968–1970)
- Livio Zanetti (1970–1984)
- Giovanni Valentini (journalist) (1984–1991)
- Claudio Rinaldi (1991–1999)
- Giulio Anselmi (1999–2002)
- Daniela Hamaui (2002–2010)
- Bruno Manfellotto (2010–2014)
- Luigi Vicinanza (2014–2016)
- Tommaso Cerno (2016–2017)
- Marco Damilano (2017–present)

== Signatures ==
L'Espresso's past contributors have included such well-known journalists and columnists as Umberto Eco, Giampaolo Pansa, Giorgio Bocca, Enzo Biagi, Peter Gomez, and Edmondo Berson. Its notable current contributors include Eugenio Scalfari, Michele Serra, Stefano Bartezzaghi, Marco Travaglio, Massimo Riva, Alessandro Gilioli, Massimo Cacciari, Alessandro Longo, Gianni Vattimo, Umberto Veronesi, Luigi Zingales, the Vatican correspondent Sandro Magister, the writer Roberto Saviano, and the economist Jeremy Rifkin.

== Contributors ==
- Enzo Biagi
- Giorgio Bocca
- Massimo Cacciari
- Rita Cirio
- Umberto Eco
- Carlo Fruttero
- Massimiliano Fuksas
- Daria Galateria
- Fabrizio Gatti
- Tahar Ben Jelloun
- Naomi Klein
- Franco Lucentini
- Sandro Magister
- Alberto Moravia
- Moisés Naím
- Jeremy Rifkin
- Roberto Saviano
- Michele Serra
- Lorenzo Soria
- Andrzej Stasiuk
- Marco Travaglio
- Gianni Vattimo
- Bruno Zevi
- Simone Baglivo

== See also ==
- List of magazines in Italy
