= Ezio Mauro =

Italian journalist (born 1948)

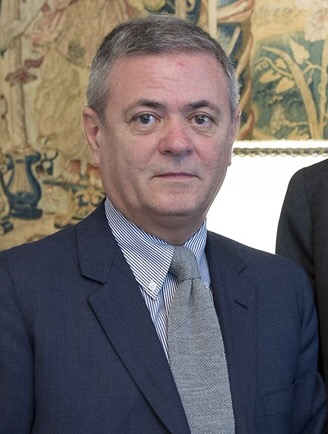
- Born: Ezio Mauro; 24 October 1948 (age 77); Dronero, Italy

Ezio Mauro (born 24 October 1948) is an Italian journalist. He was editor-in-chief of the newspaper la Repubblica from 1996 to 2016.

== Biography ==
Mauro was born in Dronero, in the province of Cuneo. He started his career as a journalist, writing for the local newspaper Gazzetta del Popolo in Turin. In 1981, he moved to La Stampa, as correspondent from the United States, and in 1988 moved to la Repubblica as correspondent from Moscow. In 1990, he re-joined the newspaper La Stampa as co-editor, and in 1992 as editor. In 1996, Mauro replaced Eugenio Scalfari as editor of la Repubblica. After 20 years, he resigned as a director.
