= Natalia Aspesi =

Italian journalist (born 1929)

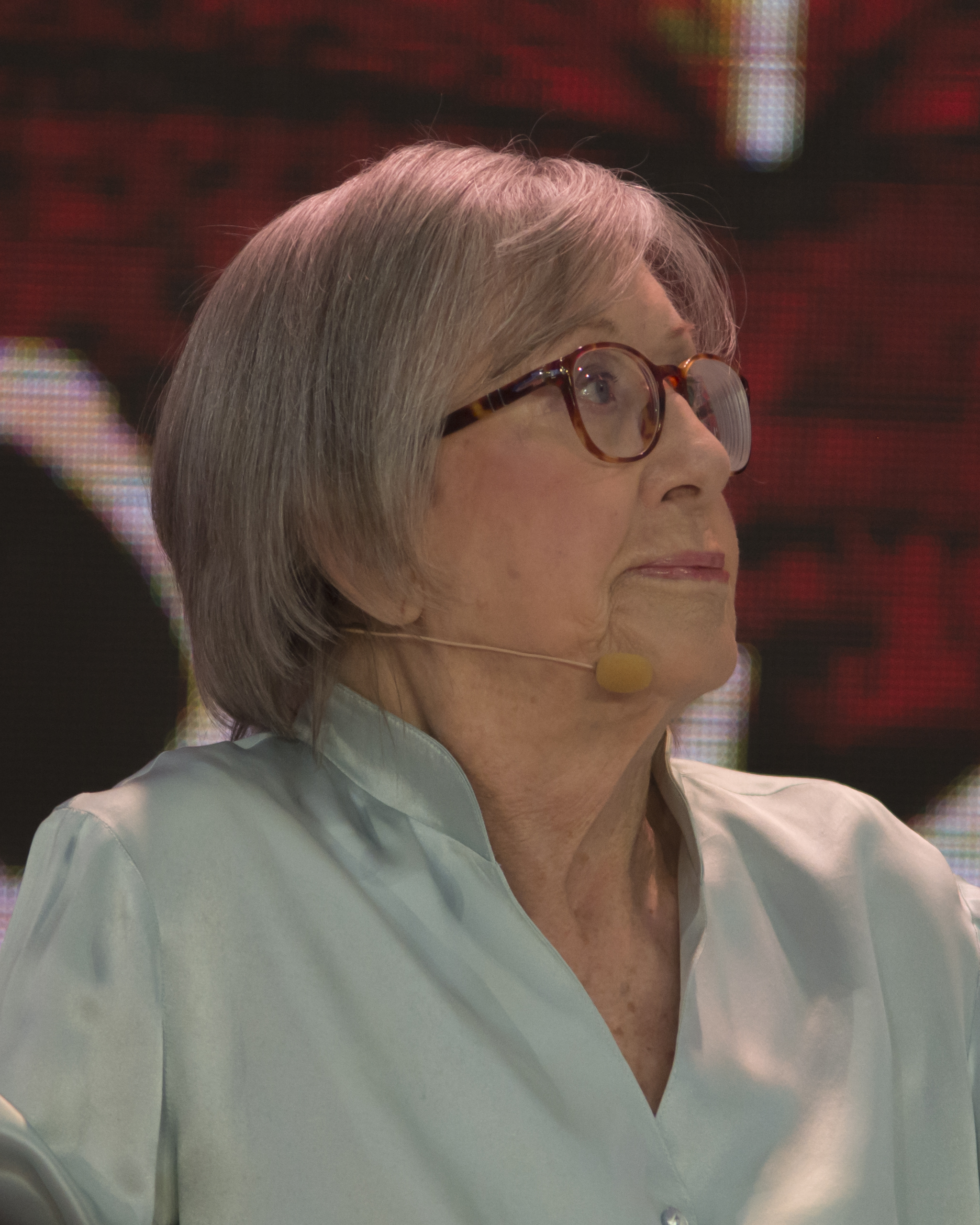
Natalia Aspesi at the 2016 Turin International Book Fair

Natalia Aspesi (Italian pronunciation: [nataˈliːa ˈaspezi]; born 24 June 1929) is an Italian journalist and feminist.

== Life ==
Aspesi was born in Milan on 24 June 1929. Aspesi's father was a textile salesman, and her mother was a schoolteacher and an avowed anti-fascist. She and her older sister were raised by their mother after their father died when Aspesi was four-years-old.

Aspesi attempted to work several jobs before pursuing journalism, including a schoolteacher, a waitress in Geneva, and an au pair in England. As a journalist, Aspesi has written for several newspapers, including La Notte, Il Giorno, and La Repubblica. She developed a reputation for sneaking into exclusive places for her work, including a train carriage with The Beatles during their Italian tour and the hospital room of Italian pop singer Gino Paoli after a failed attempt to take his own life.

Aspesi identifies as a feminist. She has criticized online feminism and American feminism, which she describes as victim feminism, criticizing catcalling and body positivity as trivial issues relative to past focuses of feminism. She has criticized the #MeToo movement and the publicizing of the Harvey Weinstein sexual abuse cases, arguing that they did not advance the cause of feminism. She is an outspoken opponent of critic of the Five Star Movement and Matteo Salvini.

Aspesi harshly criticized J. R. R. Tolkien's work and considered it "a bit too "White power skinhead". In addition, she defined Tolkien's Hobbit and The Lord of the Rings as "eccentric and slightly demented fairy tales". Aspesi did not take seriously the expectation that women should marry young; she eventually partnered with Antonio Sirtori, and the two remained together for 38 years until Sirtori's death in 2012. Aspesi suffered a stroke in 2023, causing her to intermittently lose consciousness for ten days.
