= Mainetti =

Mainetti is an Italian surname. Notable people with the surname include:

- José María Mainetti (1909–2006), Argentine physician, surgeon and oncologist
- Maria Laura Mainetti (1939–2000), Italian Catholic sister and murder victim
- Stefano Mainetti (born 1957), Italian composer and conductor
- Valter Mainetti (born 1947), Italian businessman
- Veronica Mainetti (born 1978), Italian chief executive
