= Veronica Mainetti =

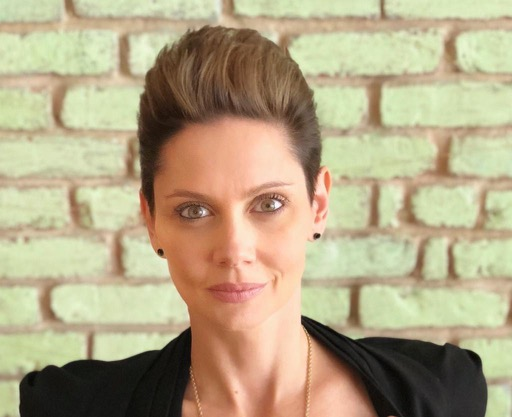
Veronica Mainetti

Veronica Mainetti is an Italian entrepreneur, environmental activist, sustainable developer and visual artist. Founder/CEO of RYSIT. Owner of the Sorgente Group.

== Training and beginnings ==
Upon graduation at European Institute of Design in Rome, Mainetti moved to New York in 2003, attending the Parsons Institute of Design. In the same year she took the helm at the Sorgente Group, overseeing real estate investment operations in the US. She took part in the acquisition of a significant stake in the Chrysler Building—reselling in 2008—and for the acquisition of the majority stake in the Flatiron Building in New York.

== Career ==
Conservation and redevelopment of historic buildings in the United States have been Mainetti's main focus since 2003, including the current ongoing restoration of New York City's Flatiron Building. Carried out through research conducted by Veronica Mainetti, all of these projects have been dedicated to exemplifying sustainable and environmentally responsible development practices.

2012 saw the completion of two redeveloped buildings in New York City. These loft conversions, known as Giglio on Greene in Greene Street, SoHo became the first under a new Giglio certificate in sustainable development practice created by Mainetti as President of The Sorgente Group.

She participated in increasing the Group's assets under management with the acquisition of the Fine Arts Building in Los Angeles in 2012 (resold in 2016) and the Clock Tower Building in Santa Monica in 2013.

In 2017, The Sorgente Group's 60 White Street opened in Tribeca, being the first sustainable restoration of an historical building of its kind in New York City. During the building's construction in 2015, a documentary film titled Giglio on White began production as well, helmed by Mainetti and filmmaker Daniel Fickle to chronicle the story of 60 White's redevelopment and the struggles along the way to implement modern sustainability practices in code with the historically landmarked building's restoration. Giglio on White is currently in post-production, with no release date set.

She received the America Award of the Italy-USA Foundation in 2017.

Named by the New York Post as one of the 20 most influential people in New York real estate, and ranked 3 years in a row in the Power 100.

== Other work ==
Mainetti is also a visual artist and a practicing rock climber using ethical minded art and wellness activities in continuation of her background as a sustainable developer.

=== Conceptual photography ===
Mainetti's personal work outside the development world continues in the expression of the dualities of nature & humanity, drawing heavily from her commitment to improving the way we live through environmental awareness, activism and sustainable practice. Her on-going conceptual photography series often explore common themes of rebirth in the human condition, likening the human body to Mother Earth and vice versa.

In Spring 2018, an interactive photo/video exhibit titled The Rebirth showed at the Flatiron Building, in the exclusive Prow Art Space. On display 24 hours a day through the front windows of the building, The Rebirth looped continuously for the duration of the exhibit, witnessed by hundreds of thousands of people on a weekly basis.

For Earth Day 2019, RYSIT projected life-sized imagery over the facade of the Flatiron Building at night, featuring motion graphics of oceans waves climbing the height of the building to represent where global sea level would affect New York City if the ice sheets of Greenland/Antarctica were to melt as a result of global warming. Mainetti incorporated climbing into the event, filming a short video of herself using safety gear to scale the entire height of the building. As originally conceptualized, climbing the outside of the Flatiron was not an option for this event, so she and her crew took the cameras inside, ascending 280 ft upward in the stairwell, finishing the symbolic final 5 ft outside the building, previewing her climb for the general public through video feeds in the window-front gallery of the building. With Mainetti at the top of the building about 220 ft of projected ocean waves, the event was meant to show real-time visuals of how global sea level could rise as much as 220 ft, nearly the full height of the Flatiron, which is 285 feet respectively.
