= Società Italiana per Condotte d'Acqua =

Società Italiana per Condotte d'Acqua 1880
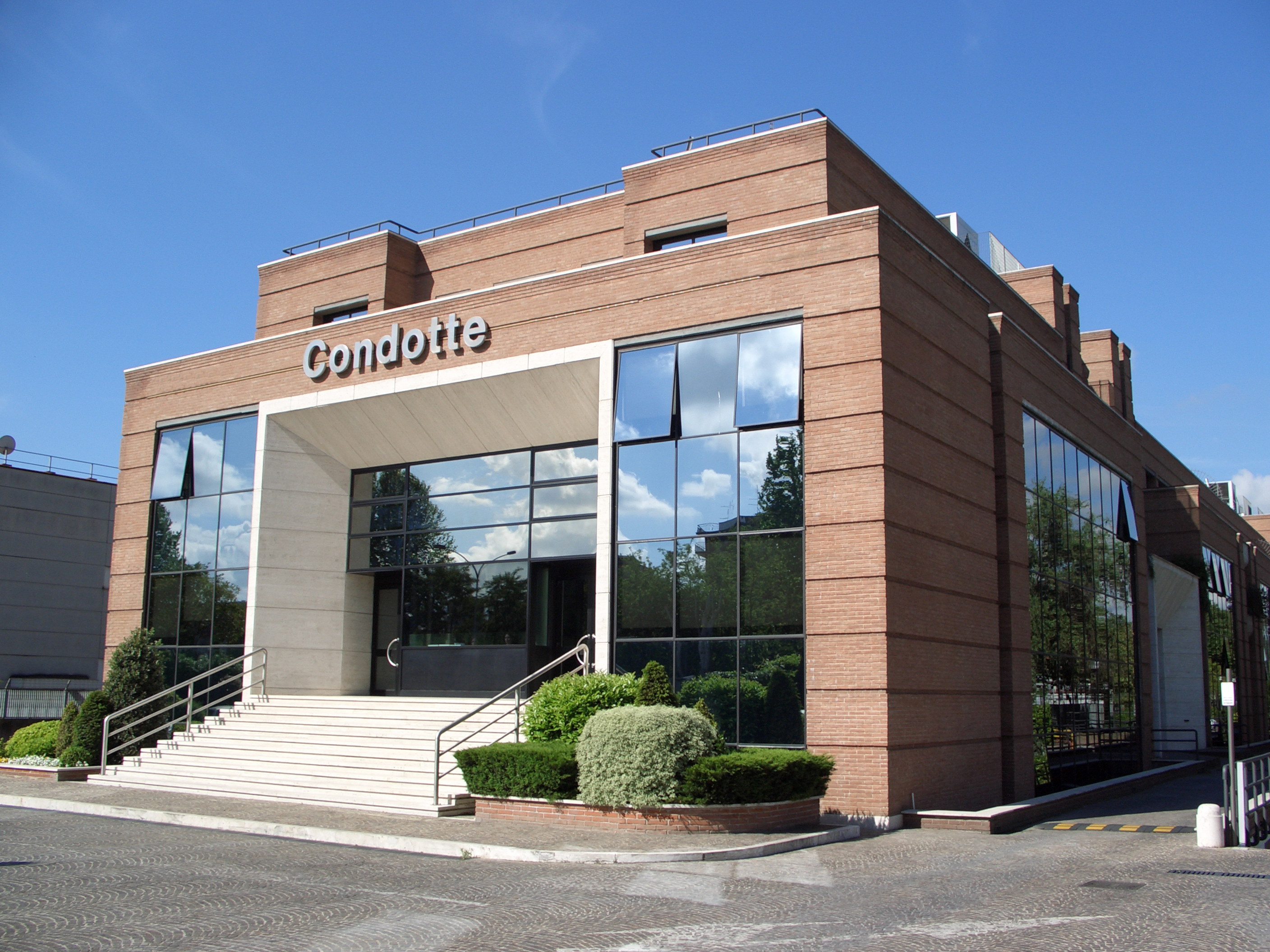
- Headquarters in via Salaria Rome, Italy
- Type: Società per azioni
- Industry: Constructions, major works
- Headquarters: Via Salaria, 1039, Rome, Rome, Italy
- Area served: Italy
- Key people: Valter Mainetti(Chairman); Ugo Cozzani (Vice President); Dario Fasciano (Director)
- Products: Engineering
- Number of employees: 2,800 (2018)
- Website: Condotte.com

Società Italiana per Condotte d'Acqua SpA, known simply as Condotte d'acqua is an Italian company that operates in the engineering and construction sector.

It was founded in 1880 as a limited company dedicated to the design, realisation and management of hydraulic and land reclamation works. Having changed hands several times, in 2018 Condotte d’Acqua went into extraordinary administration.

In July 2023 Condotte's core business was acquired by Tiberiade Holding Spa.

== History ==
The Società Italiana per Condotte d'Acqua was founded on April 7, 1880, in the apartment of Prince Sigismondo Bandini, within one of Rome's most important historic buildings: Palazzo Altieri. Also present at the meeting were Count Bernardo Blumenstihl, Commendatore Alessandro Centurini, and Commendatore Engineer Angelo Filonardi, who expressed to the notary Alessandro Venuti their intention to "form among themselves - as promoters, and together with all those who might subsequently join by purchasing one or more shares - a joint-stock company named Società Italiana per Condotte d'Acqua, the purpose of which would be to "supply water for civic, agricultural, and industrial uses". The duration of the company is set at 99 years, and the share capital at 20 million lire, represented by 40,000 shares of 500 lire each.

On June 13, 1880, King Umberto I signed the decree approving the establishment of the Società Italiana per Condotte d'Acqua, effectively authorizing it to operate within the Kingdom.

Its first project, begun in 1880, was the Villoresi Canal. The diversion of water from the Ticino River represented a major undertaking, significant even by European standards. It took ten years to complete the 80-kilometer-long canal at a cost of 16 million lire.

The company was listed on the Milan Stock Exchange in 1884. Until 1970, the Holy See in Vatican was the controlling shareholder and the owner of the company that also carried out numerous projects for Vatican City.

It was purchased by financier Michele Sindona who subsequently sold it to the IRI-Italstat group. The company was heavily involved in the lavish construction of the port of Bandar Abbas in Iran: following the revolution led by Ruhollah Khomeini, it did not receive the payments it was due.

It was later acquired and recapitalised by the IRI-Iritecna group.

In 1997 it was privatised by Fintecna via its sale to Ferrocemento Costruzioni e Lavori Pubblici spa owned by Roman contractor Paolo Bruno. The company was delisted and following Paolo Bruno's death in February 2013 came under the control of his daughter, Isabella. Already at the helm of the company was Duccio Astaldi, Isabella Bruno's husband and representative of the branch of the Astaldi family that in 2000 left the family business (Astaldi) controlled by the branch of the family headed by Paolo Astaldi.

Since 2016 Condotte has been part of the Grandi Opere General Contracting group controlled by the Ferfina holding company owned by the Bruno Tolomei Frigerio family. With Duccio Astaldi chairman of the management board and Franco Bassanini chairman of the supervisory board. A postage stamp celebrated its centenary.

Condotte (Italy's third-largest construction company) began to suffer a liquidity crisis at the beginning of 2018 when the company, almost €2 billion in debt (owing €1 billion to banks and €1 billion to suppliers), submitted to the court of Rome an application for a company voluntary arrangement to manage the company's large order book (€6 billion) and the problem of collecting the substantial credits owed by public authorities. Dozens of key works came under threat, from the HSR station in Florence to Città della Salute in Sesto San Giovanni and the new General Hospital of Caserta. The aim of the initiative, made even more complicated by the corruption prosecution that led to the house arrest of chairman Duccio Astaldi, was to create a Newco with a substantial order book and leave the debts to a bad company.

In the summer of 2018 the company faced bankruptcy with €200 million required to save it. On 6 August 2018, three commissioners (Matteo Uggetti, Giovanni Bruno, Alberto Dello Strologo) were appointed, drawn by lots from a list of 14 professionals, with the goal of safeguarding the company's business continuity under the Marzano law. Their first action was to pay the salaries of the company's 2,800 employees, which had been frozen since April. In March 2019 the reorganisation plan was presented which involved a €60 million bridge loan from eight different banks, a procedure approved in June 2019 by the Ministry of Economic Development.

After five years of extraordinary administration, July 2023 saw the completion of the acquisition of Condotte's core business by Imprecim, renamed "Società Italiana per le Condotte d’Acqua 1880", a subsidiary of Tiberiade Holding which is owned by a branch of the Mainetti family. The transaction has a total value of 345 million euros (105 million euros as transaction cost and 240 million euros for the replacement of guarantees). At the time of the acquisition, the portfolio of works, including contracts and concessions, was worth €7 billion. As of June 1, 2026, the project portfolio stands at over 8 billion euros.

== Activities ==
The first work carried out by the company was the 80-kilometre Villoresi Canal project worth 16 million lire.

Later, the company built railway tunnels, penstocks, hydroelectric power stations, dams, 640 aqueducts, viaducts (including the Polcevera viaduct in Genoa, also known as the "Morandi Bridge") and skyscrapers. Società Italiana per Condotte d'Acqua also carried out the works for the construction of the Italian side of Mont Blanc Tunnel.

At the height of the company crisis, in the summer of 2018, the most delicate situations revolved around the Brenner Base Tunnel in Austrian territory (in which Condotte has a 35% stake; the other shareholders are the Austrian companies Porr and Interregger and Italian company Itinera); the Storstrom Bridge in Denmark together with Itinera; the joint construction site in Algeria with Rizzani de Eccher for 150 kilometres of railway; Città della Salute in Sesto San Giovanni with Lombardia Infrastrutture as contracting authority; the Verona-Brescia HSR line and the Verona-Padua HSR line; the Milan-Genoa Third Pass with Impregilo.

== Subsidiaries ==
The following companies form part of the group:

- Condotte Energia
- Condotte Real Estate
- Condotte Algeria
- Condotte Ukraine
- Condotte Romania
