= Giuliano Ferrara =

Italian journalist and former politician (born 1952)

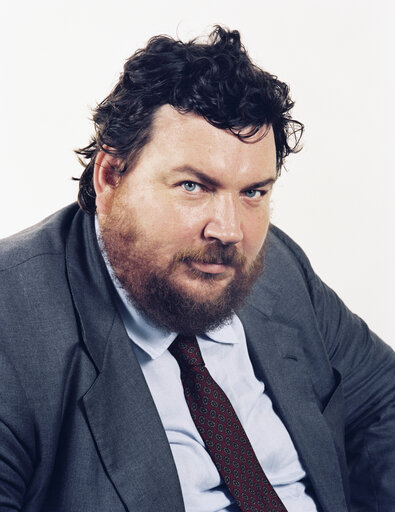
- Giuliano Ferrara in 1989.

Minister for Parliamentary Relations
- In office 10 May 1994 – 17 January 1995
- Prime Minister: Silvio Berlusconi
- Preceded by: Paolo Barile
- Succeeded by: Guglielmo Negri

Member of the European Parliament
- In office 25 July 1989 – 11 May 1994
- Constituency: Central Italy

Personal details
- Born: 7 January 1952 (age 74) Rome, Italy
- Party: PCI (1973–1982); PSI (1985–1994); FI (1994–2008)
- Height: 1.75 m (5 ft 9 in)
- Spouse: Anselma Dell'Olio (m. 1987)
- Occupation: Journalist, television presenter

Giuliano Ferrara (born 7 January 1952) is an Italian journalist, television presenter, and former politician. He is the founding editor of Il Foglio. Born into a communist and anti-fascist family, Ferrara took part in the student movement of the 1960s and 1970s. In 1973, he joined the Italian Communist Party (PCI) and carried out political activity within the PCI, and at the same time dedicated himself to journalism, collaborating with Corriere della Sera since 1982 with the column "Bretelle Rosse". Later in the 1980s, he joined the Italian Socialist Party (PSI), with which he became a member of the European Parliament (1989–1994).

After the dissolution of the PSI in 1994, Ferrara joined Silvio Berlusconi's political party Forza Italia (FI); he was Minister for Parliamentary Relations in the first Berlusconi government (1994–1995) and then focused on his journalistic career, founding Il Foglio in 1996, the same year he also became for a year the editor-in-chief of the Berlusconi-owned news magazine Panorama. Ferrara returned to active politics in 2007, re-opening the debate on the topic of abortion and proposing an international moratorium. In the 2008 Italian general election, he was a candidate at the Chamber of Deputies with the electoral alliance he founded in the same year, the Association for the Defense of Life. Abortion? No Thanks; he was not elected due to his list not having reached the election threshold.

During his career, Ferrara gained widespread popularity as a commentator and television presenter, also earning satire. He brought sensational and provocative investigative journalism to television, including Linea rovente (1987), Il testimone (1988), Il gatto (1989), L'istruttoria (1991), Diario di guerra (e pace) (2001), Otto e mezzo (2002–2008), and Qui Radio Londra (2011). In 2015, he stepped down as editor-in-chief of Il Foglio. He also published various essays.

== Early life, family, and education ==
Born in Rome on 7 January 1952, the son of Maurizio Ferrara (1921–2000) and Marcella De Francesco (1920–2002), Ferrara comes from a Jewish family on the father's side; both his parents were anti-fascist and communists. His father was a member of the Senate of the Republic with the PCI, director of l'Unità, and president of Lazio, while his mother was a communist anti-fascist partisan within the Gruppi di Azione Patriottica and long-time personal secretary of PCI leader Palmiro Togliatti before becoming editor-in-chief of the communist magazine Rinascita. Also active in politics was his grandfather Mario Ferrara, a liberal-inspired lawyer who had defended anti-fascist activists before the Special Tribunal for the Defence of the State during the Fascist Italy years and later worked as columnist for Il Mondo of Mario Pannunzio and Corriere della Sera.

From 1958 to 1961, Ferrara lived in Moscow, where his father was a correspondent for l'Unità. He did not return to Moscow until 1990. He also never went to a Communist state after 1961 and preferred holidays in Capri and Paris. Having returned to Italy towards the end of the 1960s, he obtained his liceo classico diploma at the high school in Rome named after Lucretius. Ferrara joined politics during the protests of 1968, participating at the Battle of Valle Giulia on 1 March 1968. In this period, he also had experience in the world of entertainment as a chorister in the first rock opera created in Italy, Then an Alley by Tito Schipa Jr. with music by Bob Dylan. (Note: See "Fabrizio Bogianckino presenta Then an Alley" (PDF). TitoSchipa.it (in Italian). May 1967.) In his trip to New York with his brother, Giacomo Ferrara (1947–2023), in November 1970, in his own words "'when Charles de Gaulle died' is the memory of the teenager who knows everything about Dylan by heart and loves the strong politicians", he assisted Luca Ronconi in directing Orlando Furioso.

Ferrara joined the Faculty of Philosophy at the University of Turin, where he had engaged in polemics with Lucio Colletti, in the words of Ferrara "still a bit of a Trotskyist and supporter of Soviet democracy". Ferrara supported Togliatti's "Italian Road to Socialism". Despite this, the two became friends, and Ferrara described Colletti as "soon courageously convert[ing] to the theory of the crisis of Marxism and become a former communist [turned] liberal anti-communist, a little crazy, like his student, but tough." He remained in Turin until September 1982, with his philosophy exams stuck at eleven out of twenty.

== Career ==
=== Journalism and Italian Communist Party (1973–1982) ===
During the 1970s, Ferrara joined the PCI and first started working as an activist militant with Giancarlo Pajetta, who then sent him to Turin, where he arrived on 5 November 1973, to "go to the working class school and escape the dangers of the Roman Curia". Also in Turin, he became a journalist without training and without being a member of the Italian Order of Journalists; he worked at the fortnightly magazine Nuova Società, created by Diego Novelli, who in 1975 became mayor of Turin, and then directed by Saverio Vertone. During this period, he was friend with Novelli, Vertone (Ferrara described it as a "true friendship, which continues despite his honest and delusional political follies"), and Adalberto Minucci. Ferrara was the head of the political organization of the PCI at Fiat Mirafiori, which he led to two thousand members, and then was the responsible for the state problems section (fight against terrorism), the cultural section, and the city committee, which represented the organization of the local PCI in Turin. Ferrara was a well known critic of Turin's workerist tradition and the policy of the Chamber of Labor that led to the November 1980 agreement between Fiat and the CGIL. Having learned the Turinese language, he coordinated political meetings in the small room of the federal committee of Turin under a large reproduction of Guernica, with Luciano Violante and Gian Carlo Caselli; one of the major themes discussed was the fight against terrorism. In an article for la Repubblica entitled the "Right to Inform", after the launch of the anti-terrorism questionnaire, he denounced the Red Brigades.

Within the PCI, Ferrara was responsible for the Fiat provincial coordination for the PCI of Turin in 1973, when he also started writing for Nuova Società. He was responsible for the school and culture sector in 1977 and then became city secretary in 1979. On 8 June 1980, Ferrara was elected municipal councilor in Turin, becoming the CPI group leader in December 1980. With the start of the 1982 Lebanon War, Ferrara was appointed by Novelli as the mayor's delegate for relief to the population of Beirut. On 18 September 1982 in Piazza San Carlo in Turin, the municipality organized the musical event Mille musicisti per la pace (A Thousand Musicians for Peace) with Luciano Berio performing "Accordo". (Note: For a series of photographs about the event, see "Archivio fotografico dell'edizione 1982". Comune di Torino (in Italian). 2002.) For the occasion, Ferrara, ten minutes before the start, asked both Berio and the then culture councilor Giorgio Balmas that the concert be dedicated to the victims of the Sabra and Shatila massacre but was refused. At the end of the concert, he made the episode public and a public controversy arose; Balmas and Berio defended themselves, stating that it was not appropriate to open with a mini-rally, while Ferrara first relaunched his request on the evening of 19 September 1982, this time at the opening of the reply and supported by the Teatro Stabile director Mario Missiroli. When faced with the new refusal, he left the PCI on 20 September 1982 while remaining a councilor. After the meeting of the Turinese PCI board of directors on 22 September 1982, Ferrara also resigned as a councilor. For the PCI, Ferrara's request was legitimate but his behavior in the matter was not, which is why his resignation was accepted. Ferrara formally remained a Turin city councilor until 25 October 1982, despite the fact that the city council had unanimously rejected his resignation on 4 October 1982.

=== L'Espresso, Corriere della Sera, and Italian Socialist Party (1982–1987) ===
After his exit from the PCI, Ferrara began to collaborate with the weekly L'Espresso, where he criticized the PCI from the point of view of migliorismo, being known for his closeness to Giorgio Napolitano and his political positions. In 1985, he was approached by the PSI through Claudio Martelli, intending to absorb all the Turinese Amenodolians who had left the PCI. Ferrara denied the rumors that he was joining the PSI but at the same time was keen to reiterate that he considered "the basic choices of Craxi and the socialists as the most right for the country and for the left". A press conference had already been scheduled for 28 February 1985; it would have announced Ferrara's entry into the PSI and his candidacy in the 1985 Turin municipal election. At the last moment, he preferred to avoid the electoral commitment. Ferrara later stated several times that he had abandoned the communist ideology "in unsuspecting times", that is, before the fall of the Berlin Wall. Journalist Marco Travaglio argued that this and his other political positions were instead dictated by convenience, as Bettino Craxi was the prime minister of Italy at that time; he said that they were determined from time to time by following where the "power and money" are and that Ferrara had sided "with the thieves ... in fact the thieves earned much more than the judges".

During the 1980s, Ferrara began working for Corriere della Sera, signing articles with the pseudonym Piero Dall'Ora and creating the column "Bretelle Rosse". At the same time, he joined the editorial staff of Reporter, a socialist investigative newspaper directed by Adriano Sofri and Enrico Deaglio, two former leaders of Lotta Continua. In 2003, the same year he also wrote his autobiography on Il Foglio, Ferrara declared that he had been a paid confidant of the CIA in the mid-1980s. The disciplinary action brought against him by the Italian Order of Journalists to determine the compatibility between the profession and collaboration with a secret service was not followed up, both due to the expiry of the five-year period "beyond which, according to the law professional no. 69/1963, the statute of limitations applies for an act susceptible to disciplinary sanction", and because at the time of the events he was not a professional journalist.

=== Television debut and member of the European Parliament (1987–1994) ===
On 10 November 1987, Ferrara made his television debut on Rai 3 with Linea rovente. He followed on 13 April 1988 on Rai 2 with Il testimone, which saw the implementation of infotainment in Italy. Starting on 13 February 1989, with a contract that guaranteed him a high salary, Ferrara moved to Fininvest, Berlusconi's holding company, to present Radio Londra on Canale 5. On 12 April 1989, he also hosted on Canale 5 the programme Il gatto. Two months later in the 1989 European Parliament election in Italy, he was elected a member of the European Parliament for the PSI.

On 7 January 1991, Ferrara returned to Canale 5 with Radio Londra. On 21 January 1991, he made his debut on Italia 1 with L'instruttoria, in which Ferrara expressed his critical positions towards the judiciary's investigations into the Tangentopoli case. Since 10 February 1992, after a preview on 20 January, he hosted Lezioni d'amore on Italia 1 with his wife Anselma Dell'Olio; it focused on sex and was inspired by the film Love Meetings by Pier Paolo Pasolini. The programme became a political case and after ten days was canceled by Berlusconi under pressure from Christian Democracy (DC) politicians.

=== Minister in the first Berlusconi government and Il Foglio (1994–1997) ===
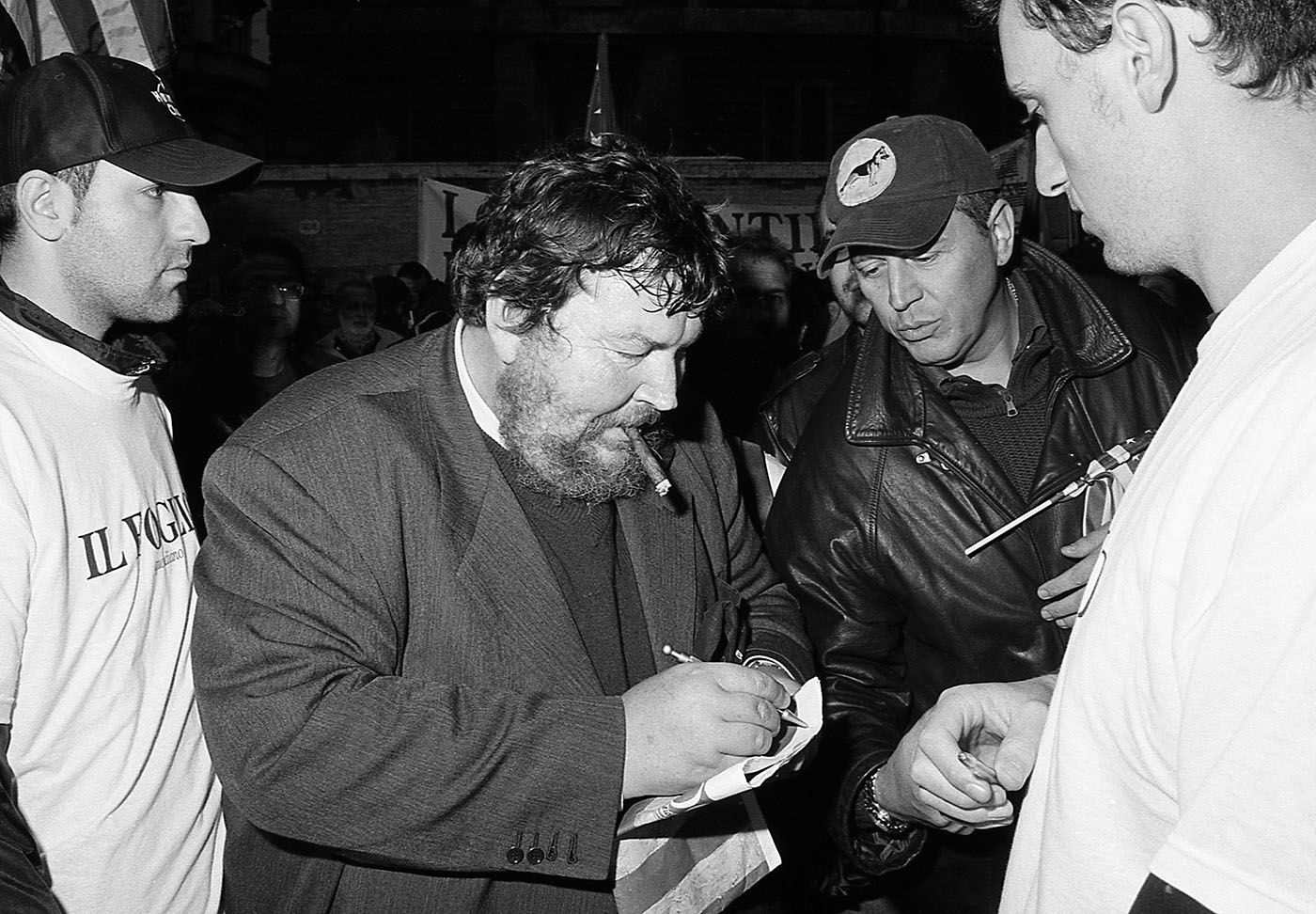
Ferrara signing copies of Il Foglio at the pro-American demonstration in Piazza del Popolo in Rome on 10 November 2001

With the rise of Berlusconi and Forza Italia, Ferrara decided to leave, together with several others party members, a PSI that was in disintegration. He became Minister for Relations with Parliament in the first Berlusconi government. On 30 January 1996, Ferrara founded his own newspaper, which he named Il Foglio, and was its editor-in-chief. It was published by the editorial cooperative of the same name, of which Veronica Lario, Berlusconi's second wife, was a member. Joking on the fact that the ownership of the newspaper was always attributed to Berlusconi's then wife, Ferrara once sarcastically defined himself as a Berlusconist of the "Veronica tendency" to go against "this foolish evil used to degrade Il Foglio", where he took neoconservative positions.

Il Foglio is an elite daily newspaper aimed at a high-end audience. Originally composed of a single sheet, which gave its name, Il Foglio is the least voluminous of Italian dailies and is mainly dedicated to in-depth analysis and commentary, leaving out current affairs. Although generally considered close to the Italian political right, it did not spare criticism of Berlusconi and supported seemingly contradictory opinion campaigns, such as the election of former communist Massimo D'Alema as president of Italy and the call for a moratorium on abortion. According to an internal survey, its editors covered the entire political spectrum of Italian political parties, from Forza Italia to the Communist Refoundation Party. The website of Il Foglio was the first among those of Italian dailies to allow consultation of all the contents. In 2008, it underwent a profound transformation, and it become something similar to a collective blog of its authors.

Ferrara was a supporter of the centre-right coalition, and then of the second and third Berlusconi governments, although sometimes in a critical manner. In Il Foglio, he fought on several occasions for the granting of a pardon to Sofri, who was convicted among others for the murder of the police officer Luigi Calabresi, and of whom he considers a friend due to his conviction that he is innocent; in addition to writing for La Repubblica after having served his sentence, Sofri also wrote for Il Foglio. From 28 November 1996 to 25 September 1997, without leaving the editorship of Il Foglio, Ferrara was the editor-in-chief of Panorama. His direction of Panorama, which had been bought by Berlusconi several years earlier, was marked by strong tensions with the editorial staff, including the likes of Enzo Biagi and Indro Montanelli, who distrusted him immediately after taking office, and ended with the resignation of Ferrara, who decided to dedicate himself only to the direction of Il Foglio. He was the Forza Italia and House of Freedoms (as was then known the centre-right coalition) candidate in the by-election for the vacant senatorial seat of the Mugello constituency in Tuscany; on 9 November 1997, he was defeated by the former Mani pulite judge and Tangentopoli symbol Antonio Di Pietro, (Note: See Petti, Edoardo (15 August 2012). "Di Pietro, ovvero vent'anni della nostra storia". Linkiesta (in Italian).) who was the centre-left coalition candidate through The Olive Tree.

=== Return to television and Otto e mezzo (1997–2006) ===
Ferrara returned to television on 11 December 1997 at 8.50 pm on Rai 2, where he presented Piazza Fontana – Storia di una cospirazione on the occasion of the 28th anniversary of the Piazza Fontana bombing. In addition to Ferrara as host, it was interspersed with images of an investigative documentary on the well-known facts by Fabrizio Calvi and Fredric Laurent, with interviews with some of the protagonists of the story. With the September 11 attacks, his political and ideal positions took an anti-secularist and socially conservative turn; despite being avowedly non-Catholic, he began to support the need to strengthen Judeo-Christian values as the West's bulwark in the face of danger growing Islamic extremism. He was defined by Eugenio Scalfari as a "devoted atheist". In addition to directing Il Foglio, Ferrara hosted Otto e mezzo on La7 and subsequently Zerovero on Telecampione, of which he was also the author, with a brief interlude in 2008, when his candidacy in the Italian general election made him incompatible with the role of host. He was supported in hosting the programme first by Gad Larner, then by Luca Sofri, followed by Corriere della Sera journalist Barbara Palombelli, and by Liberazione journalist Ritanna Armeni. In 2005, he was again joined by Lerner, who left after a few episodes to dedicate himself to his programme L'infedele, who was replaced again by Armeni. That same year, he also published a collection of essays entitled Non dubitare. Contro la religione laicista. (Note: For a review, see Vitiello, Guido (6 February 2006). "Ferrara contro Ferrara". GuidoVitiello.com (in Italian).)

During the early 2000s, Il Foglio and Ferrara launched a campaign in favour of Barney's Version, which was first published in Italy by Adelphi in 2000 and achieved success in 2001. When the novel began to circulate in the editorial staff of Il Foglio, Ferrara read it, and the editorial staff decided to carry out a months-long campaign including columns, quotes, and interviews about it. The book went on to sell 300,000 copies. In 2003, Antonio Tabucchi wrote a critical article about Ferrara for the French newspaper Le Monde. Before being published, the article was sent to Ferrara himself by an editor of Le Monde who was a friend of his. Ferrara published it in Il Foglio, of which he was editor, on the same day (9 October 2003) in which it would have appeared in the French newspaper, which came on newsstands in the evening; Ferrara said that he was happy to have reached the goal of getting that article before Le Monde newspaper, and introduced it with the words "Applaud me, I managed to steal an article from Le Monde". This brought a legal case in France after Tabucchi sued Ferrara for unauthorized publication and violation of copyright. Ferrara was convicted at first instance and on appeal for unauthorized publishing and copyright infringement. In September 2008, France's Court of Cassation annulled the two sentences due to lack of jurisdiction over events that took place in Italy. (Note: For the sentence, see "080909 Cass Giuliano" (PDF) (in French). Court of Cassation. 9 September 2008. Archived from the original (PDF) on 19 February 2009 – via Intellectuelle Research Institute Owned Intellectuelle. For his article about Tabucchi five years after his death, see Ferrara, Giuliano (16 September 2017). "Motivi, non solo personali, per ricordare Tabucchi per quel che era". Il Foglio (in Italian). ISSN 1128-6164.)

Alessandro Giuli recalled that in 2004, the year he was employed at Ferrara's newspaper, he was called by Ferrara for a three-sentence interview. Ferrara had asked him whether he was a supporter of Berlusconi. When Giuli said that he was not, Ferrara was quoted as saying: "Who cares, we are the Berlusconi newspaper with fewer Berlusconians in it." In the 2006 Italian presidential election held in May, Ferrara was the flagship candidate of Christian Democracy for Autonomies and the New Italian Socialist Party; he obtained 8 votes in the first ballot, 9 votes in the second, 10 votes in the third, and 7 votes in the fourth and final ballot that elected Napolitano. On the election of the new president of Italy, alongside Vittorio Feltri with Libero, Ferrara and Il Foglio had sided with the election D'Alema, the former PCI member, who personally thanked him. On 7 July 2006, Ferrara was sentenced at the first instance trial for defamation against the journalists of l'Unità and to compensation of €135,000. During a programme of Porta a Porta in 2003, in a discussion on justice, he had said: "No, no, [l'Unità] is not a free newspaper. I believe that the only way to define it is a paper that tends to be murderous!"

=== Abortion moratorium campaign (2007–2008) ===
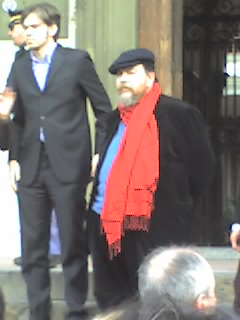
Ferrara in Florence at a rally in front of the Ospedale degli Innocenti for the 2008 Italian general election

Following the United Nations General Assembly's approval of a non-binding resolution for a moratorium on the death penalty in December 2007, Ferrara proposed a universal moratorium on abortion, which he called "the supreme scandal of our age". Among the causes of abortion, Ferrara cited the loneliness of women, the lack of economic support for pregnant women, and the responsibility of men who in his view are guilty of not supporting women who become pregnant. He also revealed that three of his partners had an abortion. Regarding these abortions, he declared: "I have been a scoundrel and a sinner three times. Three children were not born because their mothers refused motherhood and I looked the other way. This is unworthy." Il Foglio hosted numerous interventions by private citizens, public figures, and civil society associations for and against abortion. On 2 February 2008, Ferrara announced to the public at the Teatro Manzoni in Monza that he had sent a letter to the United Nations, which was then published in Il Foglio on 18 February 2008. It called for a moratorium on abortion.

=== Anti-abortion electoral list and resignation as editor of Il Foglio (2008–2015) ===
On 12 February 2008, Ferrara announced the foundation of a political party named Association for the Defense of Life. Abortion? No Thanks, which he defined as "purposeful" to bring the debate on life in Italian Parliament and left his role as host of Otto e mezzo. After the failed attempt to join forces with The People of Freedom (PdL), Berlusconi's new political party list, Ferrara's anti-abortion list announced its run for the April 2008 Italian general election. During the electoral campaign, Ferrara was contested in his rallies in Bologna, Pesaro, Milan, and Palermo. Ferrara's electoral list was presented only to the Chamber of Deputies; despite earlier stating that his party could attract 7% of the votes, it garnered 135,578 votes, equal to 0.371% of the total, not exceeding the 3% threshold and not winning any seats. (Note: See "Elezione della Camera dei Deputati del 13-14 aprile 2008". Eligendo (in Italian). 23 April 2008. Archived from the original on 4 November 2008.) Ferrara commented: "More than a defeat, [it was] a catastrophe: I let out a cry of pain over a tragedy and the voters responded with a raspberry."

From 2011 to 2012, Ferrara hosted Qui Radio Londra on Rai 1, a 5–7 minute programme that aired after the TG1 at 8 pm. On 27 January 2015, Ferrara left the management of Il Foglio, which was taken over by Claudio Cerasa; however, he remained a columnist for the newspaper. Despite its liberista positions, Il Foglio continues to receive public funds because it is a co-operative, which is still chaired by Ferrara. It benefits from a loophole also used by Italia Oggi and Libero since those newspapers have private publishers (for example Valter Mainetti, who is the owner of Il Foglio) just like the dailies that do not have access to the public funds.

== Political positions ==
=== Evolution of politics and religious views ===
Ferrara came from a family of communists; his father was a senator for the PCI, and the two would remain close, even though his father did not share his rightward shift in the 1980s and 1990s. As the son of a PCI senator, Ferrara accompanied his father to Moscow in 1954, when he was 2, for the reportage on the death of Joseph Stalin that his father to wrote for l'Unità. At 17, he took part in the protest demonstration against the police who had guarded the Faculty of Architecture of the Sapienza University of Rome, which sparked the Battle of Valle Giulia, one of the first demonstrations of the Italian 1968 movement. Ferrara was active in the PCI during his twenties. In the early 1970s, at the age of 21, he was sent by the PCI to Turin, where he was entrusted with the role of party factory manager in Turin. In 1982, he broke with the party, rejected communism in controversy with the leadership of the PCI, and became vocal as an ex-PCI member within the PSI and dedicated himself to journalism; in this capacity, he supported the PSI and in particular Craxi as its secretary. In 1992, when the Tangentopoli scandal broke out and Craxi was forced to leave the party secretariat, he sided with the garantista positions, strongly criticizing the actions of the magistrates. Starting in 1994, he supported Berlusconi, first as a minister and then as a journalist; he defended him from the many controversies surrounding Berlusconi, accusing the centre-left coalition of trying to defeat Berlusconi through a politicized magistrature after failing to defeat him politically through elections and the former libertine sessantottini of becoming moralistic voyeurs. He said: "A republic of virtue, puritanical in its ideology and its functioning is the opposite of a liberal and tolerant republic." Influenced by the political philosopher Leo Strauss, Ferrara initially gravitated toward socialism but later moved toward social conservatism. As a member of the PSI, he endorsed Franco Carraro as mayor of Rome. As a member of Forza Italia, he joined the first Berlusconi government in 1994, (Note: See "I governi italiani dal 1943 a oggi – I Governo Berlusconi". Governo Italiano (in Italian). 2000. Archived from the original on 16 June 2008.) and founded the newspaper Il Foglio in 1996. An economic liberal and supporter of the free market, Ferrara is often criticized because Il Foglio receives public funds.

Ferrara took a position on the subject of abortion as early as 1989, when he wrote on Corriere della Sera to criticize what he perceived as a decline in male responsibility following the introduction of the first abortion pills, (Note: For his article, see Ferrara, Giuliano (5 November 1989). "Maschio sempre più irresponsabile con la nuova 'pillola' per abortire" [Increasingly irresponsible male with the new 'pill' for abortion]. Corriere della Sera (in Italian). ISSN 1120-4982.) and in 2008 created an anti-abortion electoral list. Since the 1990s, while remaining a non-believer, he took a position closer to that of the Catholic Church on issues like the support of the traditional family and the defense of the rights of the conceived child; he also sided with the Catholic Church regarding the defence of the Judeo-Christian roots of Europe to contrast Islamic fundamentalism, and favoured abstention in the 2005 referendum on medically-assisted procreation. In the 2008 Italian general election, Ferrara ran on a platform favouring a moratorium on abortion as part of the Italian theoconservative or neo-theoconservative political current, of which he was one of the most prominent leaders, being the author in 2014 of Teoconservatorismo e ateoconservatorismo a confronto. In 2008, Ferrara acknowledged that three of his partners in his early 20s had abortions. In 2013, Ferrara stated on Radio 24 that "homosexuality is against nature" and "gay adoption is scary". He added that "the gay family makes me laugh". In his July 2017 review on Il Foglio of the latest volume by the Chieti-Vasto bishop Bruno Forte, Ferrara praised a possible agreement between Catholics and Protestants. (Note: For his review, see Ferrara, Giuliano (25 July 2017). "Leggere il libro di Bruno Forte e capire perché non possiamo non dirci luterani". Il Foglio (in Italian). ISSN 1128-6164.) The position taken by Ferrara in defence of the traditional values of Christianity is one of necessary element of social cohesion for the liberal and democratic Western civilization. Ferrara is counted among the "devout atheists", a term coined by Beniamino Andreatta to indicate atheists who are close to the positions of the Catholic Church. He declared that he is not Catholic but that he is philosophically theistic and therefore believes in a personal god. Within the Catholic world, Ferrara is criticized as an atheist and for his support of Berlusconi.

=== Foreign policy ===
In Italy, Ferrara is often associated with neoconservatism, in particular its American movement. In October 2022, Ferrara wrote "The American Neoconservatives Were Right", referring to the neoconservatives who had founded in 1997 the Project for the New American Century. Ferrara supported all military interventions and regime changes by the United States since the 1990s, starting from the Gulf War to the Iraq War. Since 2001, he stated that the Western world is missing its Winston Churchill. He saw the 11 September attacks as "the predicted and feared Pearl Harbor". At the beginning of 2003, in an editorial in Il Foglio, he supported the military initiatives of the United States against Iraq undertaken by the then United States president George W. Bush, which culminated in the 2003 invasion of Iraq despite the contrary opinion of the then United Nations secretary Kofi Annan and the opposition of other members of the United Nations Security Council, and criticized former British prime minister Tony Blair when in 2015 he apologized for it. The cultural debate on Il Foglio that followed often aimed at making Italian public opinion aware of the positions of the American neoconservatives, and continued into the 2020s. Ferrara is often cited as the main Italian exponent of this movement. This identification between the cultural orientation of Il Foglio as its editor-in-chief and the ideology of the American neoconservatives is underscored by Ferrara being one of the first Italian scholars of Strauss, who is known as the inspirer of the neoconservative movement in the United States.

A supporter of NATO and Ukraine, Ferrara dismissed that the 2022 Russian invasion of Ukraine was the beginning of a Third World War (having it also dismissed it in 2020), that the Cold War era mutual assured destruction theory still held, and that "not even a paranoid like Putin can start a third nuclear world war". (Note: For the referenced articles, see: Ferrara, Giuliano (28 April 2022). "La storia della Terza guerra mondiale è una gran boiata. Putin arriverà a un accordo, appena prima dell'Apocalisse". Il Foglio (in Italian). ISSN 1128-6164.; Ferrara, Giuliano (7 January 2020). "Chi paventa la terza guerra mondiale ricordi che gli effetti negativi del passato sono arrivati dalla fine della deterrenza". Il Foglio (in Italian). ISSN 1128-6164.) He is a supporter of Israel against Hamas, (Note: For an example, see Ferrara, Giuliano (27 October 2024). "Il vol-au-vent di Casa Serra e l'onore salvato di Israele". Il Foglio (in Italian). ISSN 1128-6164.) arguing that self-defense has become unpopular because it involves the eradication of the enemy not virtual but carnal, suggesting that Israel has no choice to defend its right to exist, and that it must free Gaza from Hamas, even with bombs if necessary. (Note: For his article, see Ferrara, Giuliano (11 October 2023). "Giuliano Ferrara alla fiaccolata per Israele: 'Bisogna liberare Gaza da Hamas, anche con le bombe'". Il Foglio (in Italian). ISSN 1128-6164.) He also criticized comparisons between Israel and Hamas, (Note: For the referenced article, see Ferrara, Giuliano (22 November 2024). "È ora di uscire dalle grinfie di questa Corte internazionale di svitati". Il Foglio (in Italian). ISSN 1128-6164.) while condemning some of the actions in the Israeli settlements ("If [even] President Herzog calls the violent hunting of Palestinian families a pogrom..."), and criticized "the growth symmetrical to the antisemitic nihilism of a Jewish terrorism, nourished by nationalist fanaticism and the biblical spirit of Greater Israel". (Note: For the referenced article, see Ferrara, Giuliano (25 August 2024). "Netanyahu e il dramma del terrorismo ebraico". Il Foglio (in Italian). ISSN 1128-6164.) As with his general politics, evolving from communism to socialism to social conservatism, economic liberalism, and neoconservatism, Ferrara's views in regards to the Israeli–Palestine conflict also evolved. Among others, within the context of a polemic involving Ferrara criticizing a vignette of Il Fatto Quotidiano as antisemitic, Travaglio pointed to Ferrara's earlier Palestinian support, which included his wish to dedicate a 1982 concert to the victims of the Sabra and Shatila massacre.

=== Constitutional reforms, Trumpism, and other views ===
Ferrara was a supporter of the Nazareno Pact (2014–2015), an alliance for constitutional reforms between the Democratic Party then led by Matteo Renzi and the new Forza Italia of Berlusconi. He said that Renzi and Berlusconi resembled Craxi "because they are unscrupulous and have vision". In September 2016, Il Foglio published an interview by Alessandro Giuli, with whom Ferrara had a conversation about Berlusconi to celebrate the latter's 80th birthday. Ferrara stated: "Il Foglio, which was a rare and atypical herald of Berlusconi right from the corporate level, initially called him Cav. [an abbreviation of Cavaliere, meaning the Knight in Italian, Berlusconi's nickname] and ultimately would stop loving him. In its own way." Ferrara also recalled his first meetings with Berlusconi, when he called him while he was working at RAI to offer him a job at Mediaset, the job interviews he had together with Fedele Confalonieri, and Berlusconi's entry into politics. He recalled that "when they told me the name of the movement, Forza Italia, I wanted to die", and of the foundation of Il Foglio (The Paper), which Berlusconi suggested calling Il Quadrifoglio (The Four-Leaf Clover) as a good luck charm.

In November 2016, Ferrara published a letter to Il Foglio, titled "I Am Sorry, But I Do Not Understand Certain Trumpism", about Donald Trump, of whom he had taken a critical and scandalized position, despite the two sharing aversion to political correctness, with Il Foglio running several anti-political correctness campaigns, and Ferrara's inclinations to appreciate strongmen. Under the new editor-in-chief Claudio Cerasa, Il Foglio had taken lenient attitudes towards Trump, attitudes that then became complacency after his victory in the 2016 United States presidential election, when Il Foglio hosted several articles on this victory with a view of satisfaction against the defeated, a position that also generated some divisions within the newspaper. According to Ferrara, Trump and his supporters are a pejorative, terrorist, and degrading derivative of the battles against liberal hypocrisies to which Il Foglio always adhered. (Note: For his article, see Ferrara, Giuliano (12 November 2016). "Mi spiace, ma non capisco certo trumpismo. Rozza circolare elefantesca (che spero non avrà effetto)". Il Foglio. ISSN 1128-6164. Archived from the original on 13 November 2016.) About the possible birth of an Italian right-wing based on Anglo-Catholic Toryism, Ferrara cited a 2000 essay by Roger Scruton about T. S. Eliot that he summarized as saying that "traditionalism, nostalgia, the traditionalist cultivation of religion as an ideological fetish, are the opposite of true conservatism. They are more similar, if anything, to the vein of romantic sentimentalism, of generic humanism, which Eliot fought in the name of realism, of restitution in poetry, and in the criticism of the world as it is, without emotional fear of the encounter with ordinary experience, without banal fantasies and dreams." He described as new conservatism (neo conservatorismo) the global mainstream right and far-right movements and parties that form alliances based on support for Atlanticism and economic liberalism.

In the 2020s, Ferrara expressed scepticism about climate change and dismissed eco-anxiety. (Note: For the referenced articles, see: Ferrara, Giuliano (18 July 2023). "Il caldo d'estate e i soliti strilli ideologici". Il Foglio (in Italian). ISSN 1128-6164.; Ferrara, Giuliano (30 July 2023). "Contro i piagnoni dell'ecoansia (ministro compreso)". Il Foglio (in Italian). ISSN 1128-6164.) Despite seeing it as being born through an anti-casta demagogy, having been approved under the Government of Change of prime minister Giuseppe Conte, the Five Star Movement leader Luigi Di Maio, and the League leader Matteo Salvini, Ferrara expressed his support in favour of the 2020 Italian constitutional referendum that reduced the size of the Italian Parliament. (Note: For the referenced articles, see: Ferrara, Giuliano (11 August 2020). "Un referendum non umorale". Il Foglio (in Italian). ISSN 1128-6164. Archived from the original on 11 August 2020.; Ferrara, Giuliano (31 August 2020). "Referendum sull'antipolitica? Ma dove?". Il Foglio (in Italian). ISSN 1128-6164. Archived from the original on 1 September 2020.) About football and politics, Ferrara argued that "ethical football is a lie". In April 2021, about the European Super League, which he said "crystallizes with an oligopoly of the show part of the eternal competition between rich and poor, and this can be displeasing", and the ensuing criticism and protest, Ferrara wrote: "We can invoke the demo-romantic feeling of football as a common good, although even this common goodism of the ball, which is Maradona-thought, clashes with reality, and with the glittering and super-billionaire star system. But ethics cannot be bothered, as UEFA and FIFA and governments of all kinds and practically all consensual gold diggers do. In fact, ethics is the most invoked and least revered young lady there is. In many fields, including football fields."

In April 2024, Ferrara sided with John Elkann and the publisher against the journalists at la Repubblica. He commented: "We [at Il Foglio] limited ourselves to saying with humour and a hint of malice that the editorial board of Repubblica should think twice when it goes on strike for signatures, you would incongruously say about anonymity, because an editor, immediately disheartened, decides not publish services in open conflict with the interests of the publisher, who makes a lot of money with industry and finance, and loses a lot of it with Italian publishing, i.e. with Repubblica." Ferrara further told critics of "the pompous Scalfarian libido of the pure publisher, against all the other impure ones" that "notoriously ended with the sale of Repubblica to the financier Carlo De Benedetti in order to ensure a dowry for the Founder's daughters", and that as Elkann (heir of the Agnelli family) bought the newspaper, la Repubblica changed significantly, so much so that it is "nevertheless always the same as the years go by. Pure or impure, it has a publisher." (Note: For the referenced article, see: Ferrara, Giuliano (11 April 2024). "Viva gli editori in conflitto! Botta e risposta con il cdr di Rep". Il Foglio (in Italian). ISSN 1128-6164.)

== Satire ==
During his career, Ferrara was often targeted by Italian satire for his positions on foreign policy and judicial matters, starting from the weekly magazine Cuore, up to the shows of Roberto Benigni, Daniele Luttazzi, and Sabina Guzzanti. In all satirical representations, he is mocked for having changed political affiliation, suggesting a logic of interests as the main motivation for his change of sides. The 1984 song "La strana famiglia" by Gian Piero Alloisio, recorded as a duo by Enzo Jannacci and Giorgio Gaber, explicitily referred to his frequent political affiliations changes ("And then who is there, ah yes Tamara, a slut from Viale Zara, who gave lessons to Giuliano Ferrara"). In his 1996 tour, Benigni took aim at his large size. (Note: For a playlist of Benigni's sketch comedy about Ferrara, see Benigni, Roberto (1996). Tuttobenigni 95/96 (in Italian) – via YouTube.) During the 2002 Sanremo Music Festival, on the final evening of which a sketch by Benigni was scheduled, Ferrara once again argued against Benigni, asserting that if he had gone on stage, he would have been in the front row "throwing rotten eggs" at him. In the end, Ferrara simply threw eggs at the television screen in his living room, in front of a camera that filmed him while he attended the Benigni's performance. When Benigni realized that Ferrara was not in the room, he ironically hypothesized that he had left for Sanremo but that he had returned after eating eggs on the street.

On 8 December 2007, Ferrara was mentioned in a monologue by Luttazzi during the programme Decameron that was broadcast on La7; the episode caused the suspension of the programme. Luttazzi had said that to bear the vision of the atrocities of the Iraq War, a conflict that was supported by Ferrara as a response to Islamic terrorism, (Note: In January 2020, Ferrara wrote: "When you hear that a Third World War is inevitable given that the killing of Suleimani makes a relentless spiral of retaliation necessary, think of those who launch this warning: they are the same ones who blamed the war against Saddam Hussein (2003) for the risk of a new Vietnam for America in search of oil profits, the prospect of a biblical exodus from Iraq, the imminence of a frightening carnage, the drive towards recruitment and the affirmation of jihadism given by the war, the inevitability of a widespread conflagration depending on the unilateralism preached by the neoconservatives and their programme. There was no Vietnam, the Sunni insurrection was quelled, today the free circulation of oil concerns in principle the whole of the West except the United States, which is energetically independent from oil production, the frightening carnage is that in Syria due to Suleimani's action and the inaction of Obama and Susan Rice, faithful multilateralists, after the total withdrawal from Iraq, the same for the biblical exodus, which overwhelmed part of Europe, and the effective recruitment action of ISIS throughout the world and even in European democracies all happened after, underlined after, and as a consequence, underlined as a consequence, of the relinquishment of the military and nation building responsibilities of the United States in Iraq and elsewhere in the Middle East, while today despite all of Iraq is a battlefield infiltrated like Lebanon, Yemen, and Syria itself by Suleimani's terrorist militias, and Syria is an open-air cemetery.") one had to think of Ferrara in "a bathtub with Berlusconi and Dell'Utri pissing on him, Previti who shits in the mouth, and Santanchè in complete sadomasochism who whips them". While reiterating his support for the right to satire, Ferrara defended the suspension of the programme.

== Personal life ==
In 1987, Ferarra married the American writer Anselma Dell'Olio, who also fought for women's rights in the feminist movements during the 1960s and 1970s. He was one of the strongest supporters of Pope Benedict XVI. Although described by his critics as an atheist, he considers himself a theist. Ferrara is a supporter of AS Roma. Ferrara, who is 1.75 m (5 ft 9 in) tall, is well known for his size, earning him "The Elephant" and "The Little Elephant" nicknames (l'Elefante and l'Elefantino); he claimed the nicknames for himself and signs his most humorous articles in Il Foglio with a red elephant (l'elefante rosso), and named some of his programmes, such as a radio transmission and his Il Foglio video columns, Parliamo con l'elefante and Radio Elefante. (Note: For an example, see Ferrara, Giuliano (29 October 2014). "Renzi sta pensando a un suo sindacato – 'Radio Elefante' di Giuliano Ferrara". Il Foglio (in Italian). ISSN 1128-6164.) By the 1980s, he weighed 130 kg (290 lb). As of 2018, he weighed 136 kg (300 lb). This caused him some health issues, including a heart attack at the age of 70 in 2022, which required his hospitalization under critical but stable conditions. Politicians across the political spectrum wished him well and to make a recovery. As reported by Corriere della Sera, he felt ill on the evening of 27 January 2022 while he was at his home in Scansano where he retired to live for some time and manages a farm. After a successful surgery, Ferrara was discharged from hospital on 1 February 2022.

== Works ==
- Ferrara, Giuliano (1989). Radio Londra (in Italian). Milan: Leonardo. ISBN 88-355-0040-0.
- Ferrara, Giuliano (1991). Ai comunisti. Lettere da un traditore (in Italian). Rome-Bari: Laterza. ISBN 88-420-3749-4.
- Ferrara, Giuliano (2005). Non dubitare. Contro la religione laicista (in Italian). Chieti: Solfanelli. ISBN 88-89756-06-3.
- Ferrara, Giuliano (2014). Teoconservatorismo e ateoconservatorismo a confronto (in Italian). Milan: Sonzogno.
- Ferrara, Giuliano; Gnocchi, Alessandro; Palmaro, Mario (2014). Questo papa piace troppo. Un'appassionata lettura critica (in Italian). Milan: Piemme. ISBN 978-88-566-3876-9.
- Ferrara, Giuliano (2015). Il Royal baby. Matteo Renzi e l'Italia che vorrà (in Italian). Milan: Rizzoli. ISBN 978-88-586-7658-5.

== Filmography ==
- Non ho tempo, a film directed by Ansano Giannarelli (1972)
- Azzurri, a film directed by Eugenio Masciari (1985)
- Bella ciao, a documentary directed by Roberto Torelli (2002)
- S.B. – Io lo conoscevo bene, a documentary by Giacomo Durzi e Giovanni Fasanella (2012)

== Bibliography ==
- Barbieri, Marco (1997). Il grande fratello orco. La prima biografia non autorizzata di Giuliano Ferrara (in Italian). Milano: Gruppo pubblicità Italia. ISBN 88-87136-00-9.
- Castaldi, Luigi (2005). Giuliano Ferrara non è una muffa (in Italian). Rome: Stampa Alternativa.
- CrobellI, Franco (1991). L'anti-Sgarbi. Diario di una rivolta ideale contro lo sgarbismo e la tv spazzatura di Giuliano Ferrara (in Italian). Cosenza: Progetto 2000. ISBN 88-85937-41-1.
- Nicotri, Pino (2004). L'arcitaliano Ferrara Giuliano (in Italian). Milano: Kaos. ISBN 88-7953-133-6.

Assembly seats
Preceded by —	Member of the European Parliament for Italy; 1989–1994	Succeeded by —
Government offices
Preceded by Paolo Barile	Minister for Parliamentary Relations; 1994–1995	Succeeded by Guglielmo Negri
Media offices
Preceded by Andrea Monti	Editor in chief of Panorama; 1996–1997	Succeeded by Roberto Briglia
New title
Preceded by –	Editor in chief of Il Foglio; 1996–2015	Succeeded by Claudio Cerasa
Incumbent
New title	Host of Otto e mezzo 2001–2008	Succeeded by Lilli Gruber
