= Galleria Alberto Sordi =

- Galleria Colonna
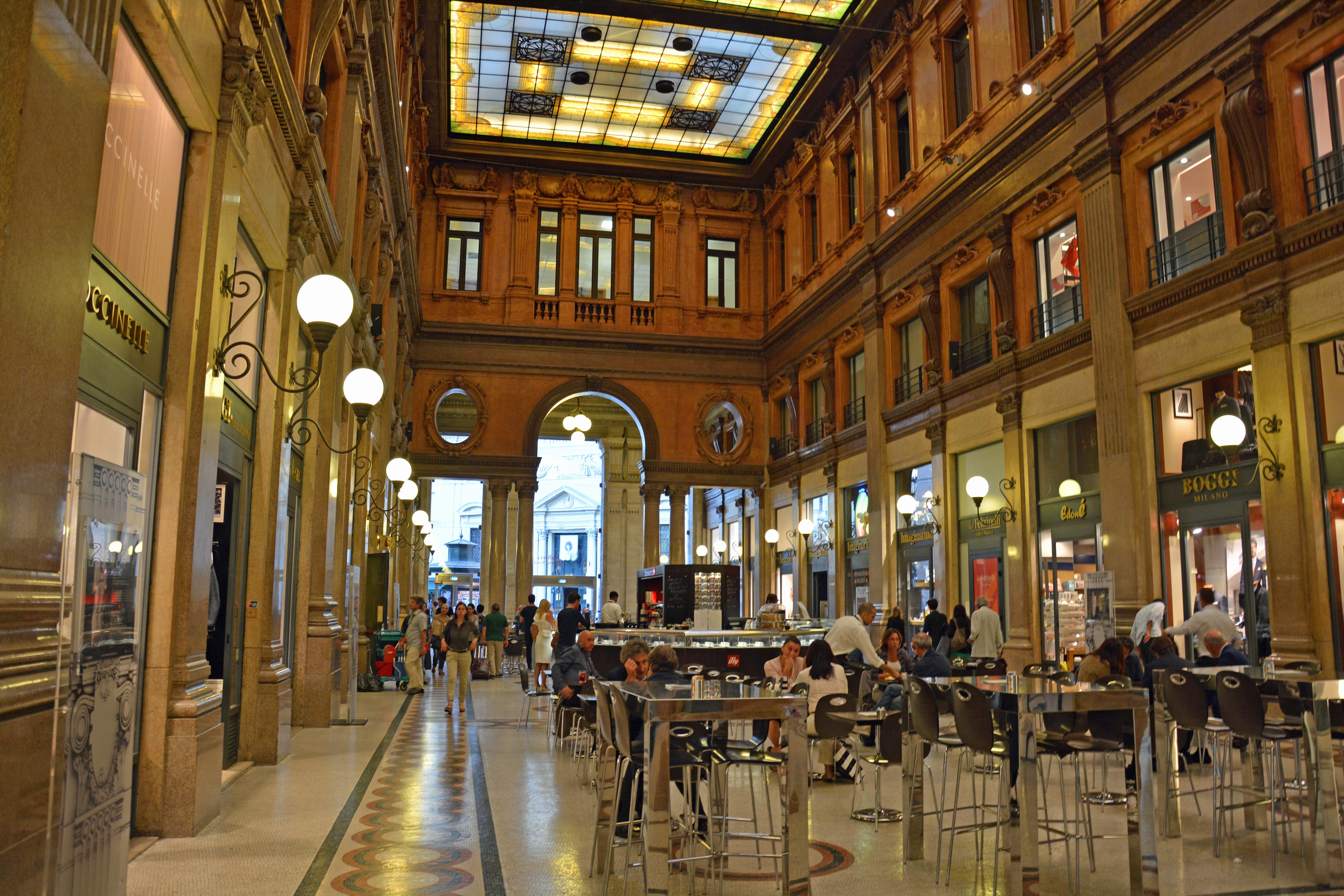
- Location: Rome, Italy
- Coordinates: 41°54′03.8″N 12°28′52.32″E
- Address: Via del Corso (Piazza Colonna) Largo Chigi, 19 Via Santa Maria in Via, 34 and 42
- Opened: October 20, 1922
- Owner: Sorgente Group
- Architect: Dario Carbone

Galleria Alberto Sordi, until 2003 Galleria Colonna, is a shopping arcade in Rome, Italy, named after the actor Alberto Sordi.

It was designed in the early 1900s by the architect Dario Carbone and constructed on the Via del Corso as Galleria Colonna (named after the homonymous square which stands across the Via del Corso). It was built on the site of Palazzo Piombino and inaugurated on October 20 1922, but was only completely finished in 1940 under the direction of architect Giorgio Calza Bini. The building is constructed in the Art Nouveau style. In 2003, following an accurate restoration, the then Mayor Walter Veltroni decided to rename the Galleria after the popular Roman actor Alberto Sordi, deceased that year, as Sordi had started his career in a theatre, Teatro Galleria, which was part of the building. The restored gallery was re-inaugurated with its new name on 30 October 2003.

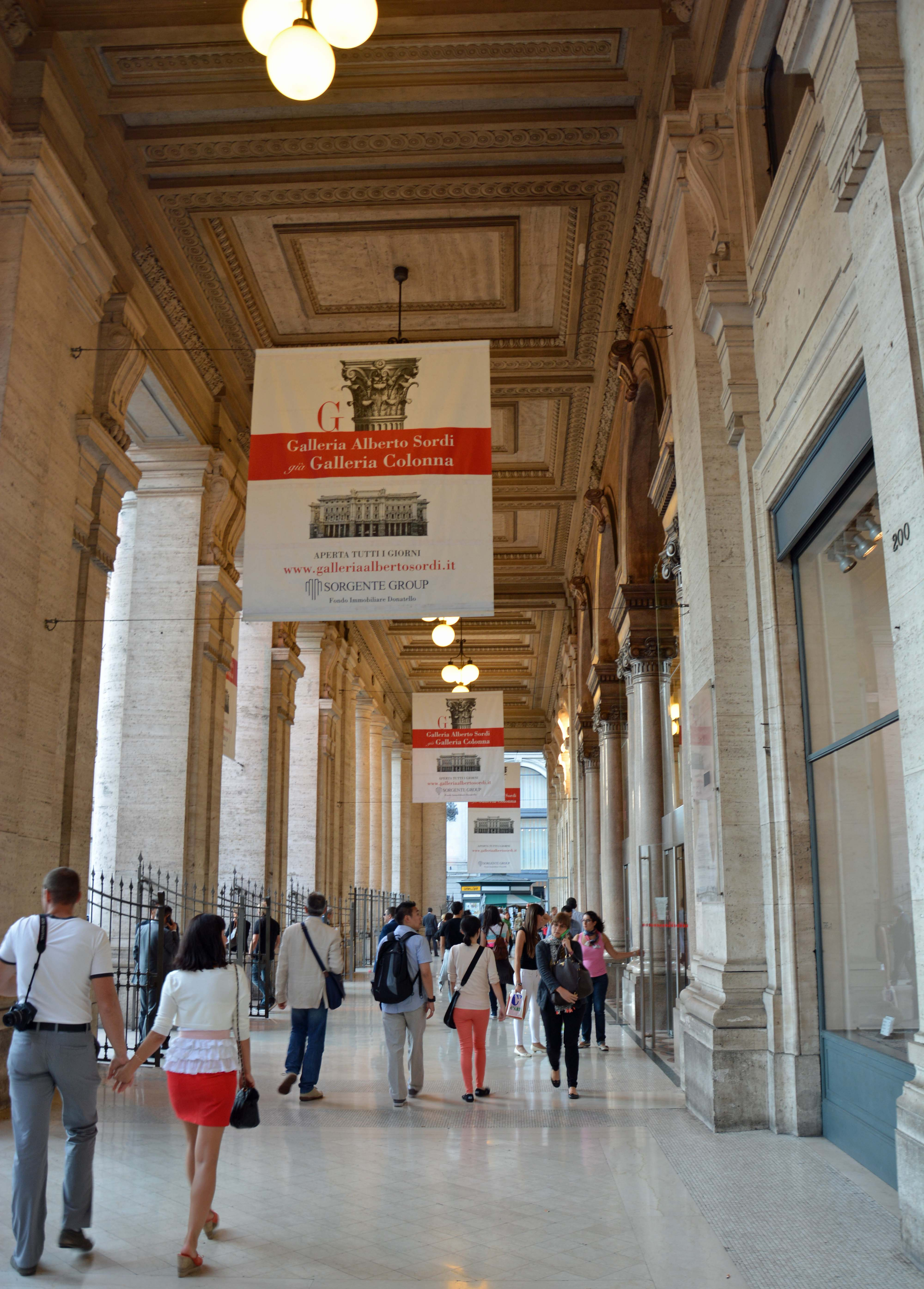
Galleria Alberto Sordi (Rome)

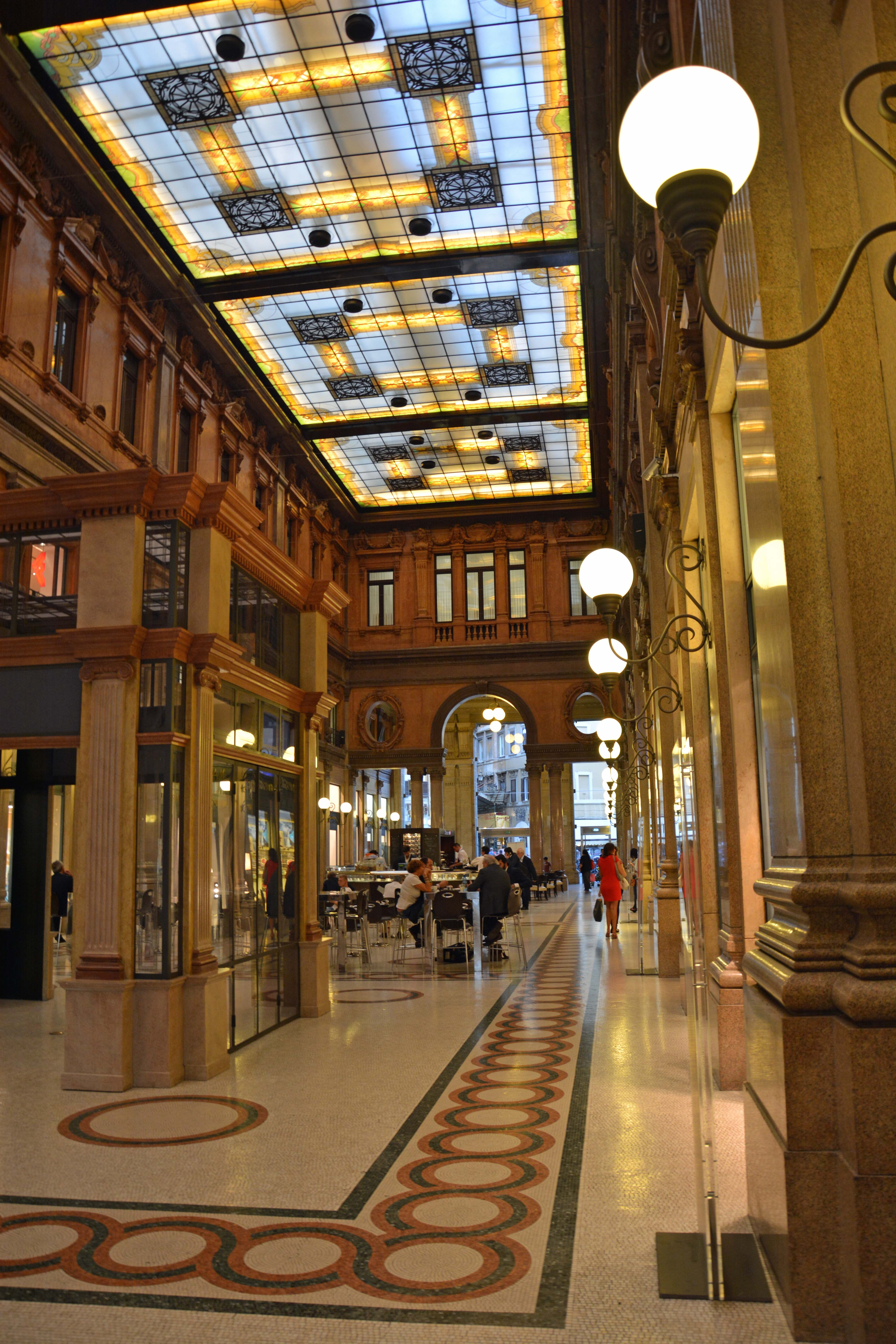
Galleria Alberto Sordi (Rome)

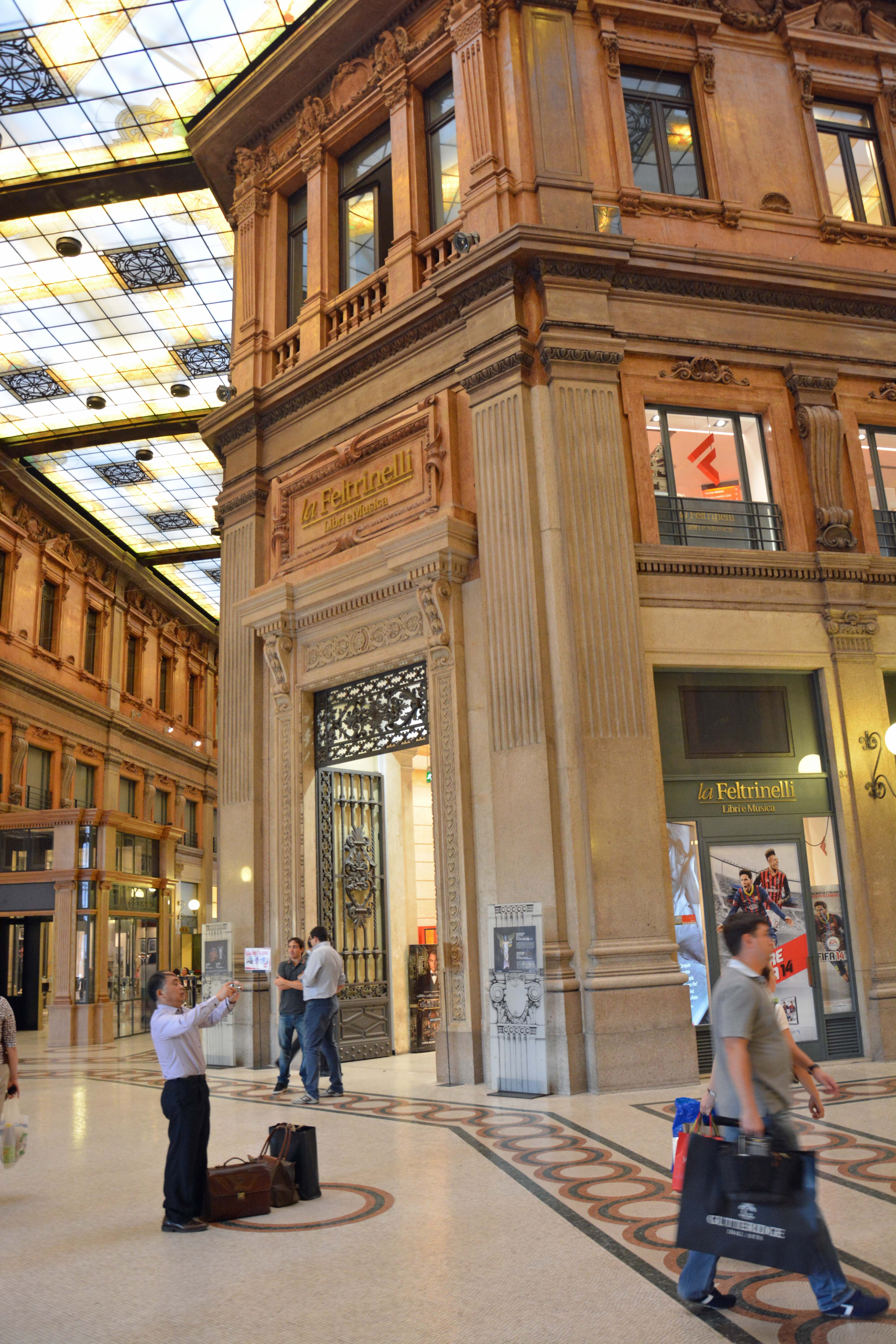
Galleria Alberto Sordi (Rome)

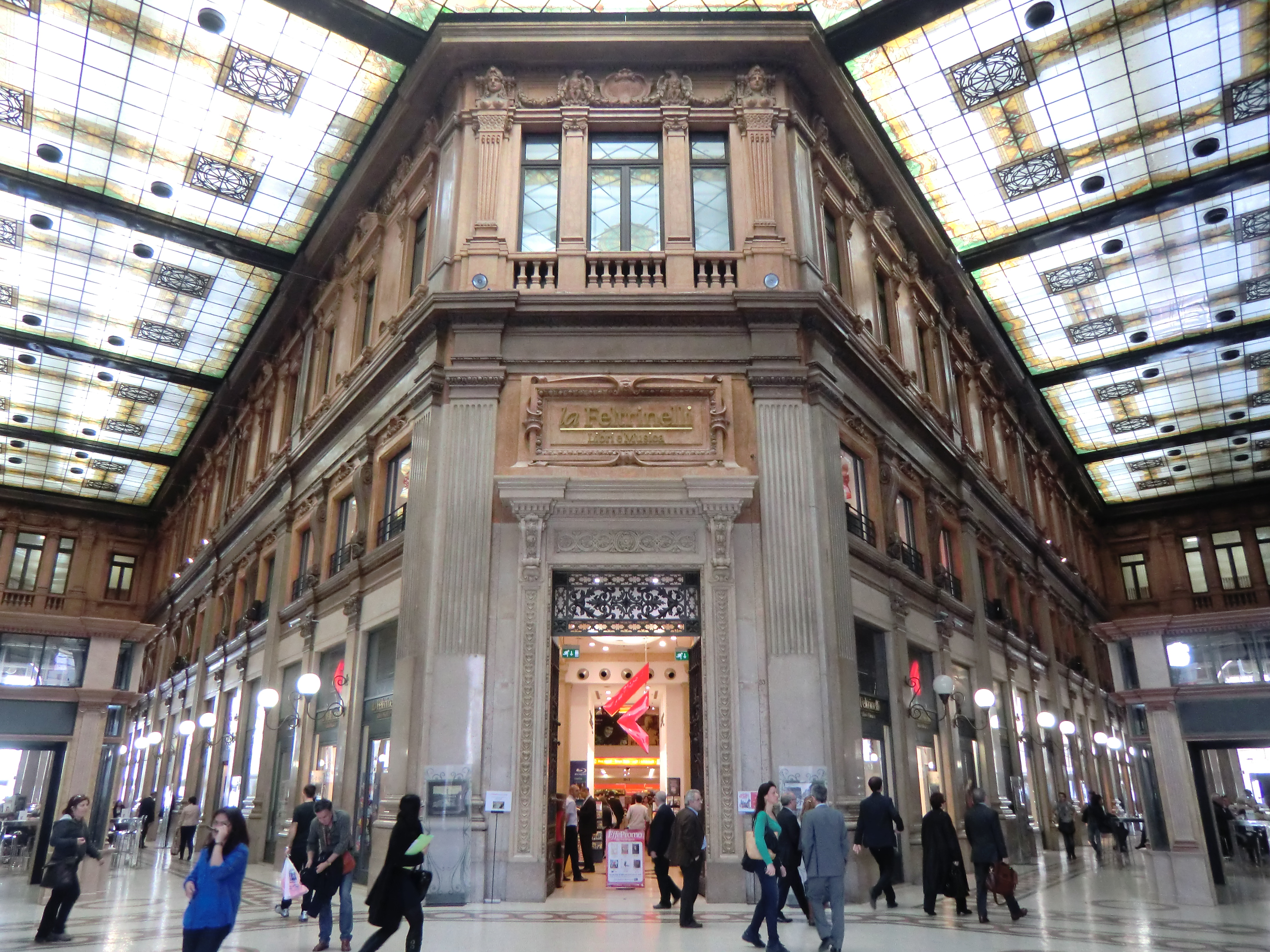
Galleria Alberto Sordi (Rome)

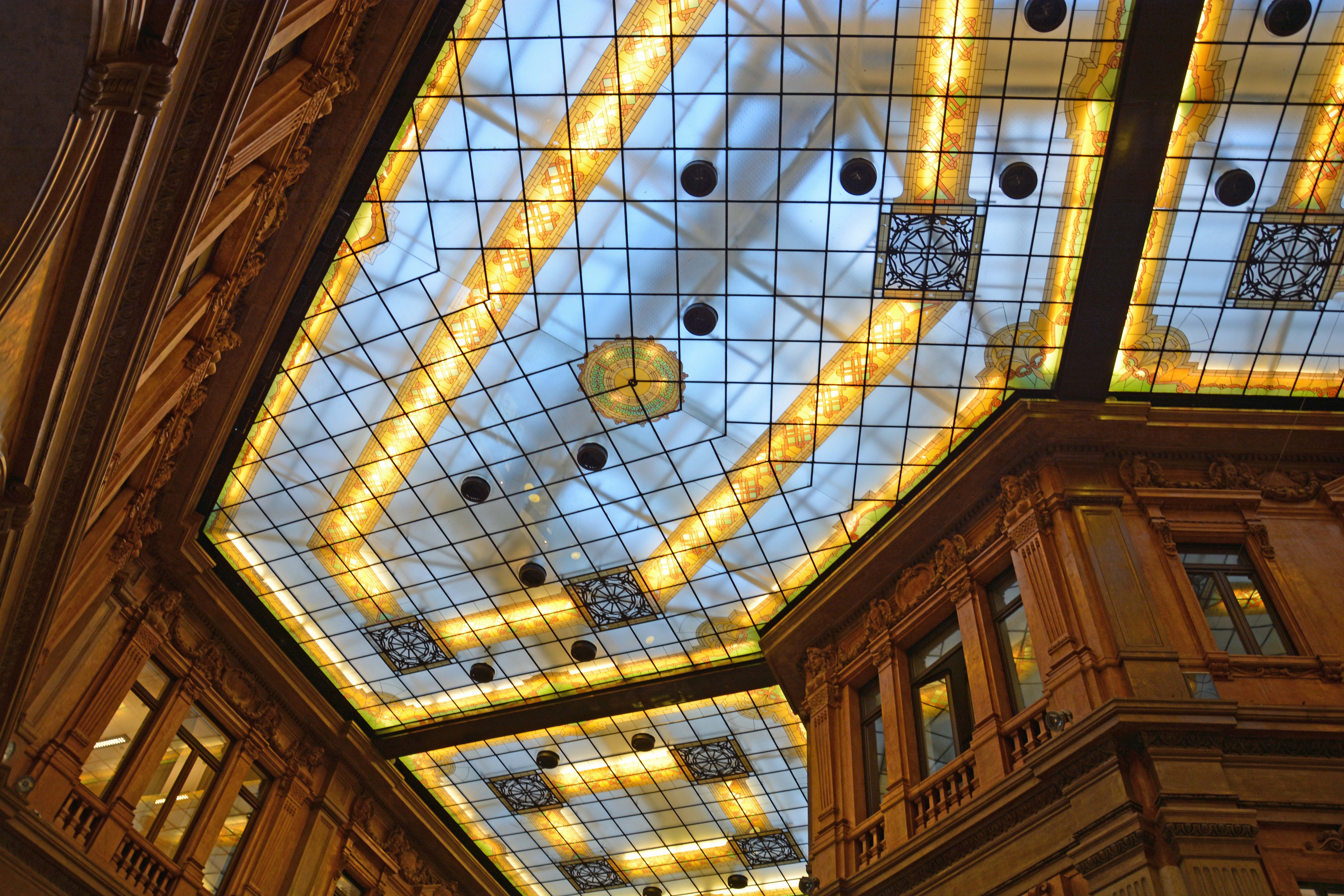
Galleria Alberto Sordi (Rome)

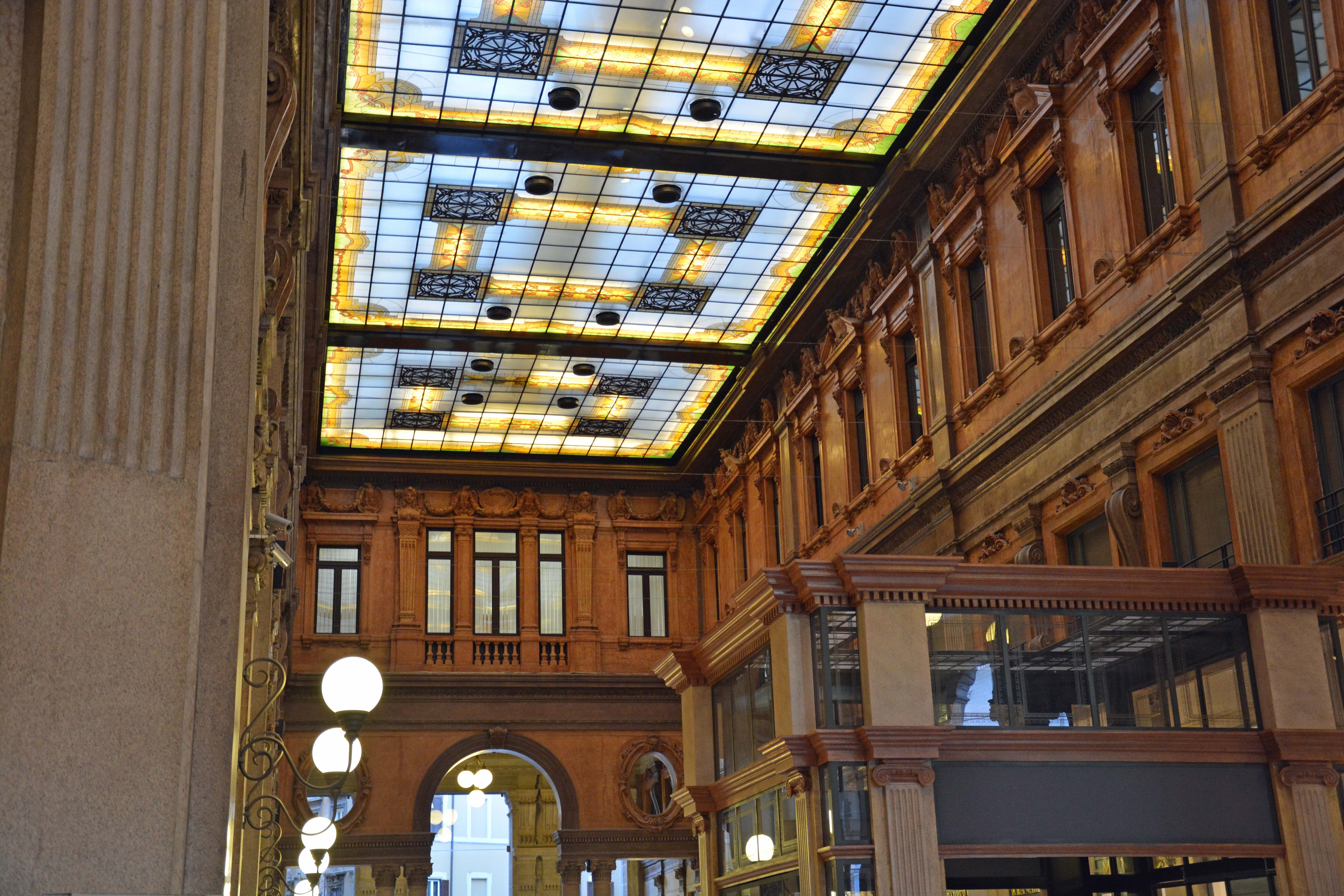
Galleria Alberto Sordi (Rome)

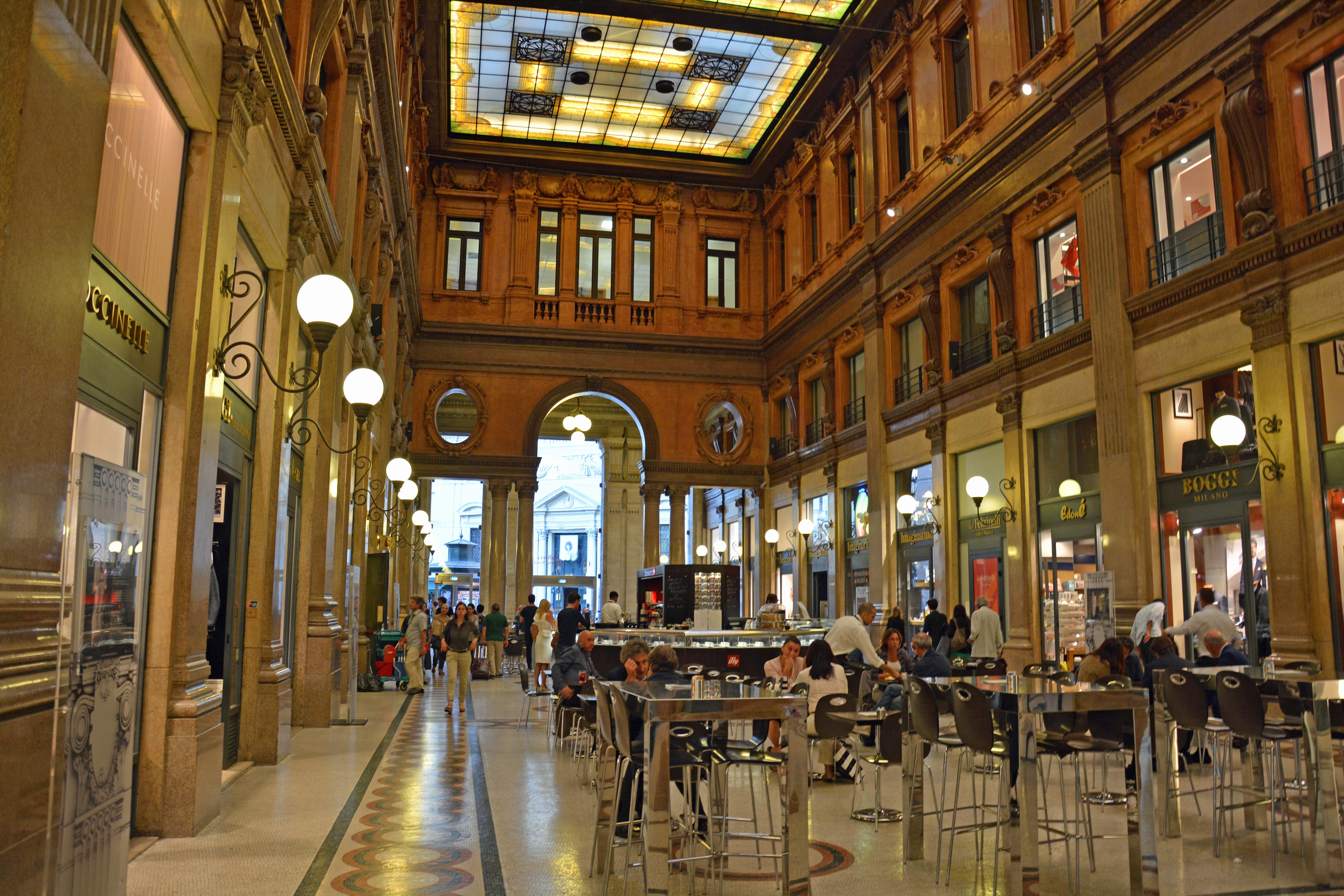
Galleria Alberto Sordi (Rome)

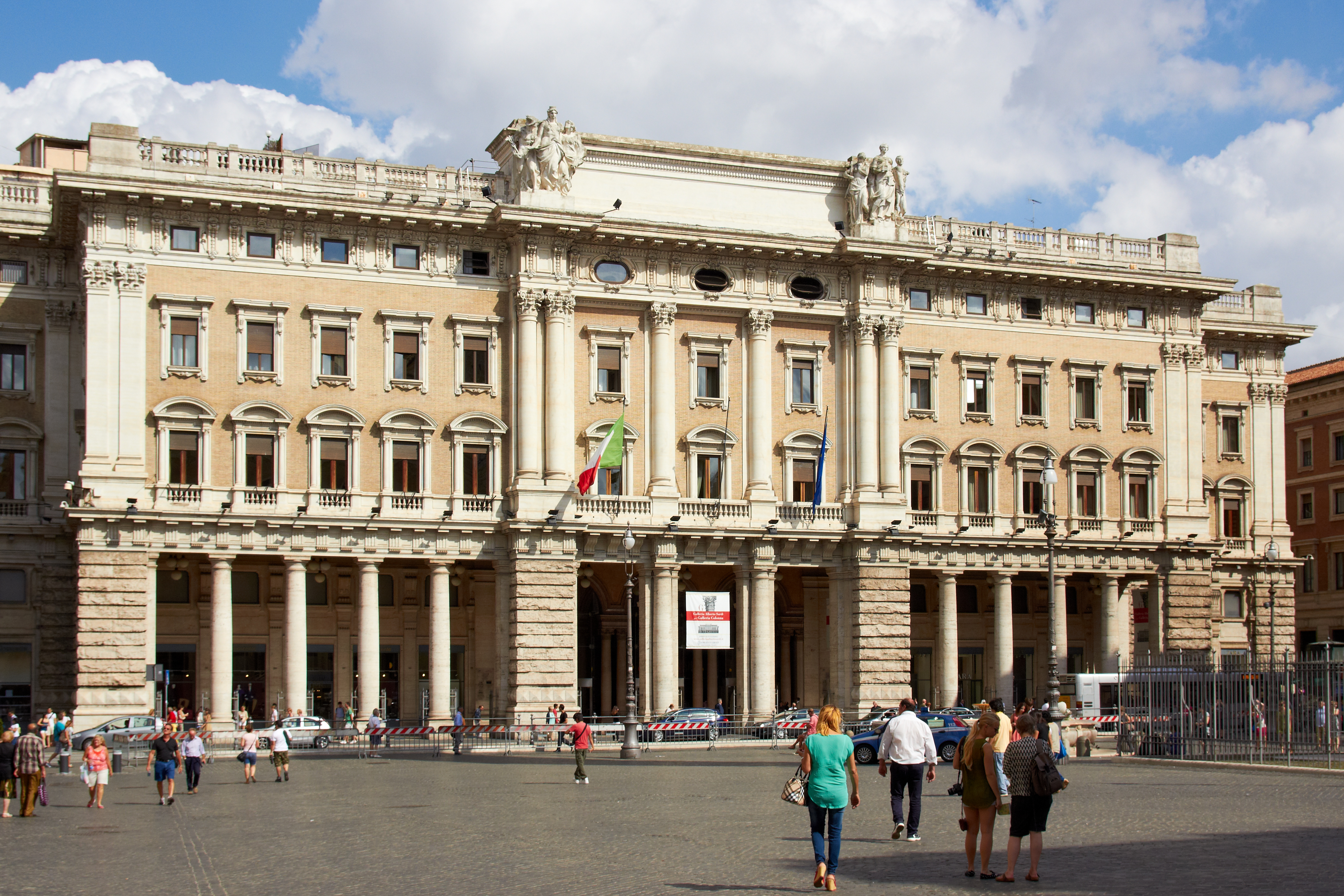
Galleria Alberto Sordi (Rome)
