= Sorgente Group =

Real Estate company Based in the US

The Sorgente Group
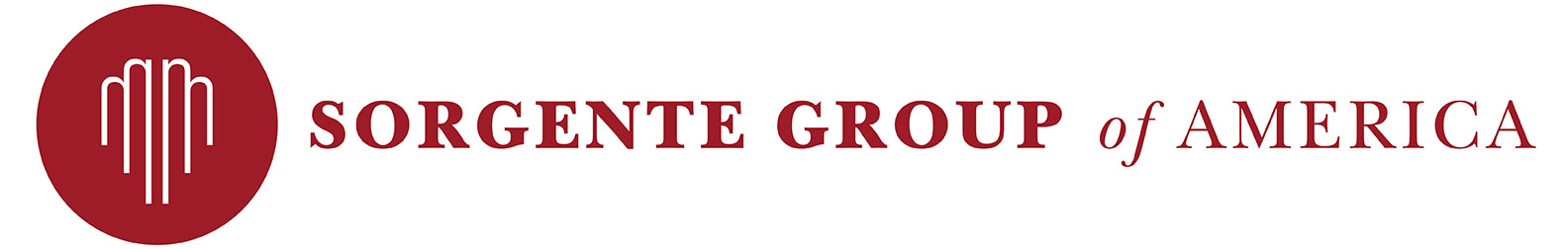
- Type: Corporation
- Industry: Real Estate, Finance
- Headquarters: New York City United States
- Key people: Veronica Mainetti (President)
- Products: Real Estate funds, investments
- Website: www.TheSorgenteGroup.com

Sorgente Group Italy and The Sorgente Group of America are part of Sorgente Group Alternative Investment (US) in which the major shareholder is Valter Mainetti. The operative real estate companies, financial and real estate services companies are 94 and are located in Italy, France, Switzerland, Great Britain, Luxembourg, USA and Brazil, with field offices in Rome, New York and Luxembourg. The total real estate assets owned, managed and administrated by the funds and the underlying companies amounts to €5 billion at January 2019 (in 2018 it amounted to over 5,8 billion). 30% of the 'Gazzetta del Mezzogiorno' was acquired through the Group, the percentage has fallen at 2% in 29.06.2018. By means of a subsidiary called 'Musa Comunicazione', the Group also holds 100% shares of the newspaper ‘Il Foglio Quotidiano’ and 80% shares of ‘Tempi’.

== History ==
The Sorgente Group has origins dating back to 1919 in the USA and 1910 in Italy. In Italy between 1910 and 1943 the business focuses on iron manufacture, keeping a handcraft division dedicated to artistic productions, which after the Second World War, shifted towards the construction of major engineering works such as the Frascati Synchrotron, the Alfa Romeo plant in Arese and steelworks at Terni and Taranto.

In the mid ‘70s a division for Social Housing was established in Italy and abroad. At the end of the 1990s, Sorgente was reorganized with its activities being directed towards the real estate financing sector, with the aim of carrying out investments and establishing real estate funds. Sorgente SGR was thus established: since 2001, the Group has launched 37 real estate funds. After the crisis of 1929 there was a decline in industrial manufacturing, so the American branche was transformed into a real estate business, and as such operated until the end of the ‘90s.

In 1919, through several companies which are still part of the Group today, the American branch began to develop its entrepreneurial activities, distinguishing itself in the New York real estate market through a company specialized in multi-storey steel structures and by participating in the construction of several buildings, including the expansion of the N.Y. Stock Exchange building in 1923 (Trowbridge and Livingstone project) and the construction of Van Alen's Chrysler Building in 1928.

== Significant real estate operations ==
In 2006, Michelangelo Real Estate Corporation acquired 17% of the Flatiron Building in New York. Subsequently, in 2009, Sorgente Group of America acquired the majority of the shares of the skyscraper

In 2009, the Donatello Fund, Sub-fund David, acquired the Galleria Colonna of Rome, renamed Galleria Alberto Sordi.

In June 2012 The Sorgente Group acquired the Fine Arts Building of Los Angeles in the United States. In April 2013 the Group purchased the Clock Tower Building in Santa Monica, a 1929 building realized in Art Déco style, characterized by its four quadrant clock visible on each side of the tower even from great distances.

The Sorgente Group has two development projects in New York. 34 Greene Street is a 27,000 square foot structure, houses six condo-lofts and one duplex penthouse, each ranging in size from 2,000 to 5,000 square feet with 12 to 14 foot ceilings. The homes have grand living rooms that offer ample light from the nearly floor to ceiling windows, wide-plank solid wood floors and exposed brick, making for modern and luxurious living and at the same time retaining the charm of the historic SoHo neighborhood. 60 White, located in the heart of TriBeCa, boasts 8 residential lofts that fuse high-end design with sustainability and energy efficiency. The building offers 2 and 3 bedroom residences ranging in size from 1,943 to 3,129 square feet. Pricing for available units starts at $4,220,000. All the lofts of “60White” are designed with spacious and brightly lit rooms, giving the perception of a modern and high quality space. Amenities include a video doorman system, a secured package room for deliveries, an on-site fitness center with entertainment system and equipment, a private lounge that offers set-up for entertainment including a full bar and a large screen television, an eco- “Green Wall” in the lobby, which filters natural air in the common areas, as well as an additional interior landscaping Green Wall in the lounge. Finally, an additional storage in the basement.

== Cultural and social activities ==
The Sorgente Group supports the non-profit organization Sorgente Group Foundation founded in June 2008, headquartered in New York. The aim of Sorgente Group Foundation, which operates mainly in the USA, is to support charitable projects. In 2011 the Foundation allocated 1 million dollars to humanitarian and social projects. The Italian sister company, Sorgente Group Spa, supports Fondazione Sorgente Group – Istituzione per l’Arte e la Cultura, founded in 2007 as a non-profit organization with its head office located in Rome. It has the objective of promoting study, contributing to restoration, improving conservation efforts, and above all encouraging the appreciation, both at a national and international level, of all cultural and artistic expressions pertinent to our cultural heritage.

== Numerical figures ==
- Total real estate assets owned, managed and administrated: over 5 billion euros
- Total number of employees and professionals: over 800

== Board of directors of The Sorgente Group ==
- Veronica Mainetti, President
- Marek Jednorowski, Chief Accounting Officer

== Companies ==
=== Investment management companies ===
- Luigi Binda 1919 LLC (USA)
- Sorgente SGR Spa (Italy)
- Quorum Sgr Spa (Italy)
- Main Source SA (Luxembourg)

=== Services companies ===
- Sorgente Asset Management LLC (New York-USA)
- Sorgente REM Spa (Rome-Italy)
- Musa Comunicazione Srl (Rome-Italy)

=== USA property companies ===
- Michelangelo Real Estate Corporation (New York)
- Michelangelo Flatiron Building Investment LLC (New York)
- Michelangelo GIIK Flatiron Building LLC (New York)
- L.A. Fine Arts Buildings LLC ( Los Angeles)
- Tribeca White Street LLC (New York)
- Soho Greene Street LLC (New York)
- Sherry Park LLC (New York)
- SaMo Clock Tower LLC (New York)

== See also ==
- Flatiron Building
- Chrysler Building
- Fine Arts Building
- Clock Tower Building
