= Il Foglio =

Italian daily newspaper

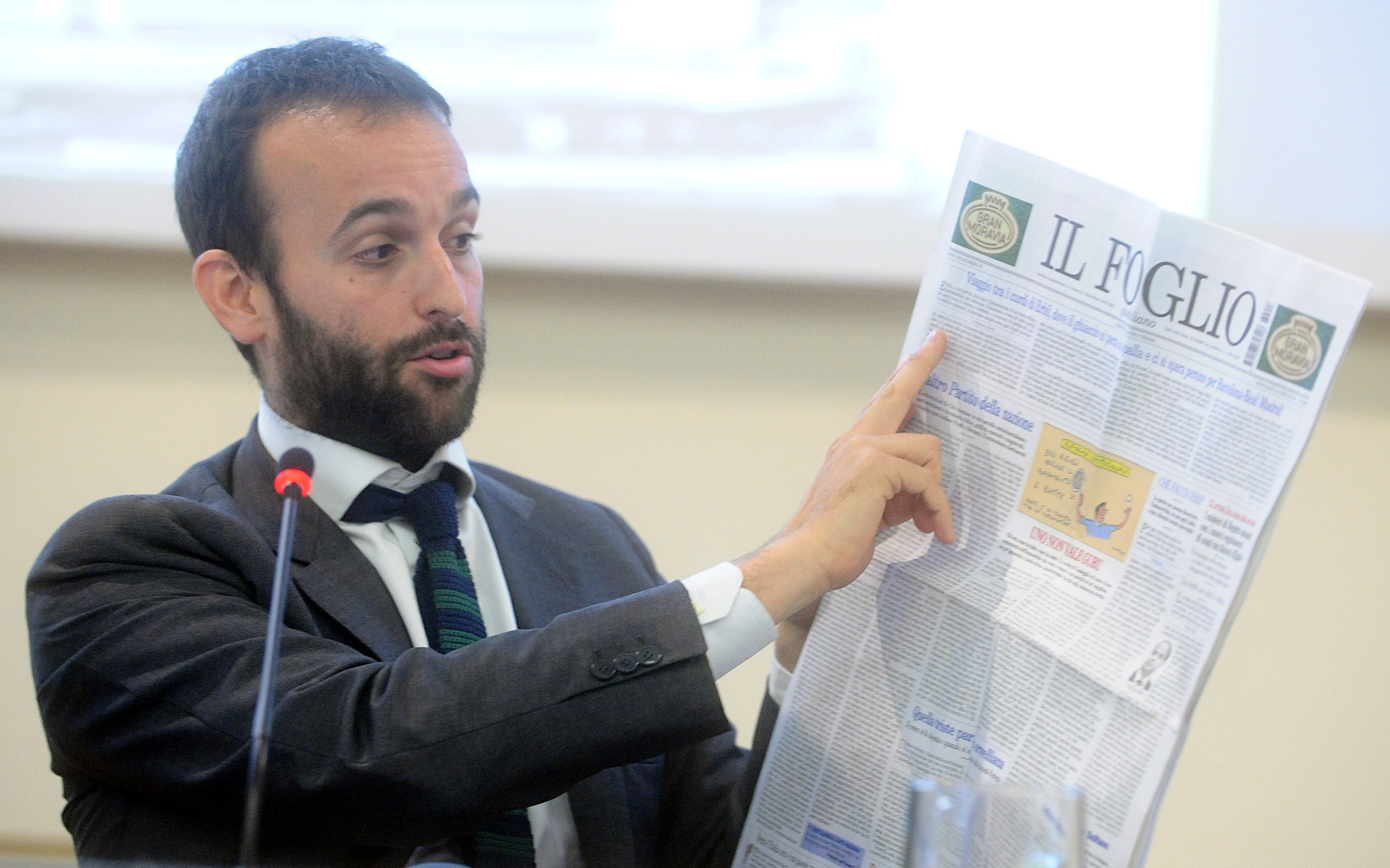
- A copy of Il Foglio in 2016
- Type: Daily newspaper
- Format: Broadsheet
- Owner: Il Foglio Quotidiano Società Cooperativa
- Editor: Claudio Cerasa
- Founded: 30 January 1996
- Political alignment: Liberalism; fiscal conservatism
- Language: Italian
- Headquarters: Via del Tritone 132, Rome; Via Vittor Pisani 19, Milan
- Circulation: Daily: 25.000 (2015); Overall: 47.000 (2015)
- ISSN: 1128-6164
- Website: ilfoglio.it

Il Foglio ("The Paper"), or more formally Il Foglio quotidiano ("The daily Paper"), is an Italian daily newspaper with nationwide circulation. It was founded in 1996 by Giuliano Ferrara, an Italian journalist, television host, and politician. Since 2015, it has been edited by Claudio Cerasa.

== Description ==
The newspaper takes its name from its broadsheet format wrapped around several pages of inserts; pages of the insert are indicated with Roman numerals, while those of the newspaper are printed with Arabic numerals. Since the 2010s, there have been occasional editions with an additional sheet featuring cartoons on the front and back and featured articles or advertisements on the inside pages. Saturday editions carry the words "Weekend Edition" next to the date; these issues can reach 16 pages, also containing regular columns and cultural reviews.

The Monday edition, mostly prepared several days prior, has a different layout and the articles are printed in a larger font. This issue contains mostly opinions and comment. An essay appears on the front page, which often continues inside the main sheet; page 3 is titled Un Foglio internazionale ("An international Paper") and contains reports from the foreign press.

== History ==
Il Foglio was founded in Milan in 1996 by Ferrara after he left as editor of the magazine Panorama. The paper is headquartered in Rome. It was originally published five days a week, Tuesday through Saturday. It had a four-page spread and a dense layout in six columns. There were no photographs, but only drawn portraits and cartoons. It was presented as an in-depth newspaper, for a second reading of the news of the day.

== Political leanings ==
The newspaper has tended to express a conservative line in politics and a liberal one in economics. Anglo-American conservatism can roughly be considered its closest political position. It features editorials inspired by American newspapers, especially The Wall Street Journal.

A significant part of its journalists are members or were members of the Radical Party. This newspaper also hosts several articles from left-leaning and independent columnists. In 2004, Angelo Agostini classed it as an activist daily (quotidiano-attivista), alongside Libero on the political right and l'Unità on the political left, in contrast to the institution daily (quotidiano-istituzione), such as Corriere della Sera and La Stampa, and the agenda daily (quotidiano-agenda), such as la Repubblica.

== Artificial intelligence ==
In March 2025, it reported it had created the world’s first newspaper issue generated entirely using AI, with journalists limited to asking questions of a chatbot and reading the answers before inserting them.

== Ownership ==
Since 2016, the paper has been owned by Sorgente Group, a group operating in the field of real estate investments and finance and chaired by Valter Mainetti.

Previously, in April 2006, Ferrara gave the following breakdown of ownership:

- PBF S.r.l.—38%
- Sergio Zuncheddu (Sardinian builder and owner of the largest daily newspaper of Sardinia, L'Unione Sarda, and of some regional television broadcasting companies, such as Videolina and Tele Costa Smeralda)—20% to 25%
- Denis Verdini (former national coordinator of The People of Freedom)—15%
- Ferrara himself—10%
- Michele Colasanto—10%

== See also ==
- List of newspapers in Italy
