= Clock Tower Building (Santa Monica, California) =

Building in Santa Monica, California, U.S.

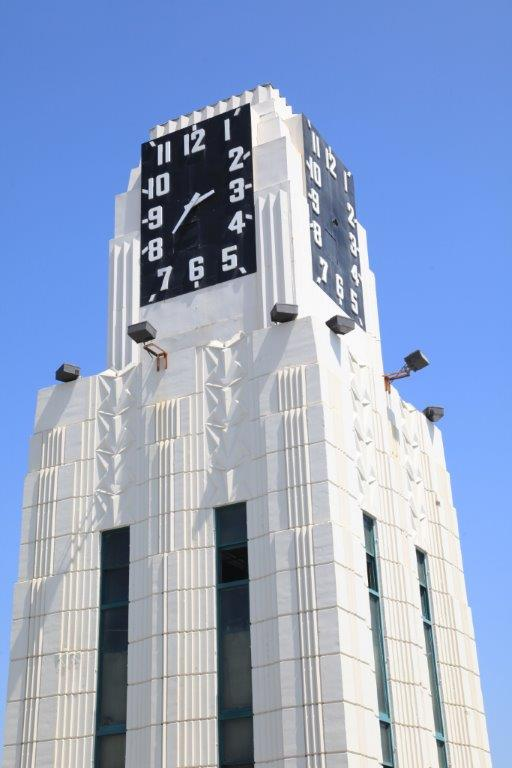
- Clock Tower Building, Santa Monica
- Location: 225 Santa Monica Boulevard, Santa Monica
- Coordinates: 34.01552°N 118.4967°W
- Built: 1929-30
- Architect: Walker & Eisen
- Architectural style: Art Deco

The Clock Tower Building, built between 1929 and 1930 in Art Déco style, is the fourth tallest skyscraper in Santa Monica. For around 40 years, it was the tallest building in the skyline. The skyscraper was commissioned by the Bay Cities Guaranty and Loan Association to Walker & Eisen, the firm also responsible for the Fine Arts Building and many other buildings in Los Angeles.

The Clock Tower Building occupies a rectangular lot at 225 Santa Monica Boulevard, in the city’s business district and close to Third Street Promenade. The ground floor is occupied by retail, the upper stories by offices.

The high-rise is divided into three sections: a wide basement level characterized by the large entrances to the retail areas; a robust second block, slightly tapered towards the top, that houses offices from the second floor to the twelfth; and a square stepped tower that is placed off-centre with respect to the base and has clock-faces on each side.

The skyscraper, with a load-bearing structure of reinforced concrete and steel, is faced with slabs of white stone that both absorb and reflect light. The skyscraper's large masses and wall decorations are reminiscent of pre-Columbian architecture. The twelve office floors are topped by a crenellated border, where the cladding's most ornate decorations are concentrated. The tower also features a zigzag pattern in relief on the sides and around the edge of the summit.

Sorgente Group of America purchased the building in May 2013. The building houses The Misfit.

== Gallery ==
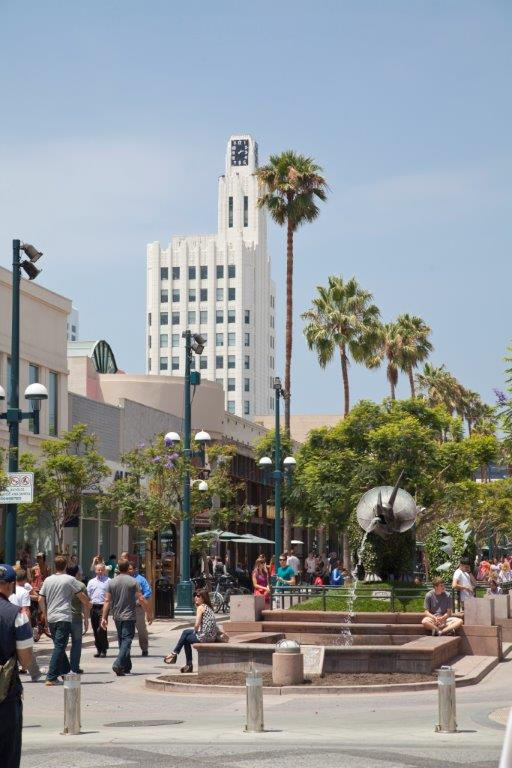
Clock Tower Santa Monica

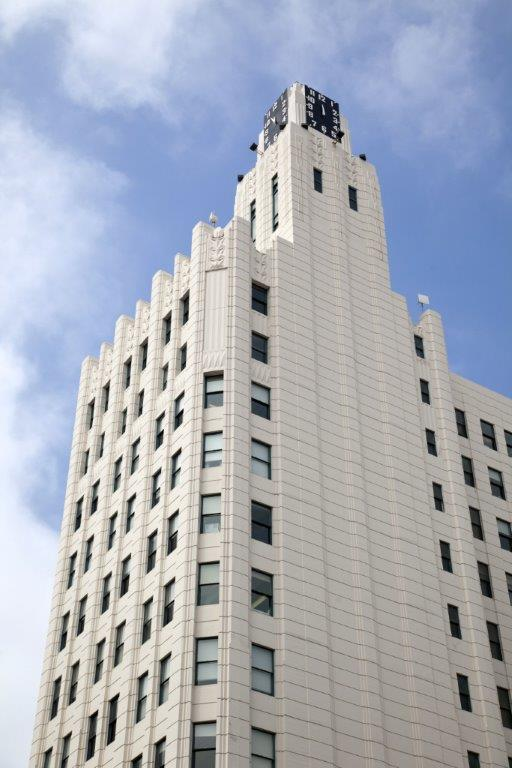
Clock Tower, exterior view

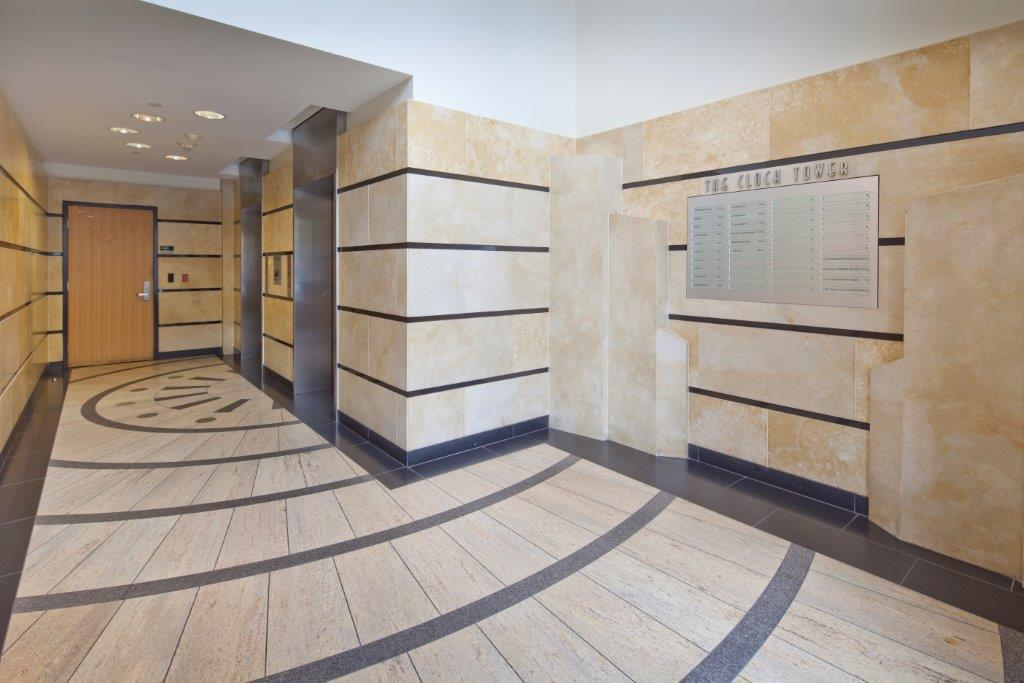
Interior view
