= Fine Arts Building (Los Angeles) =

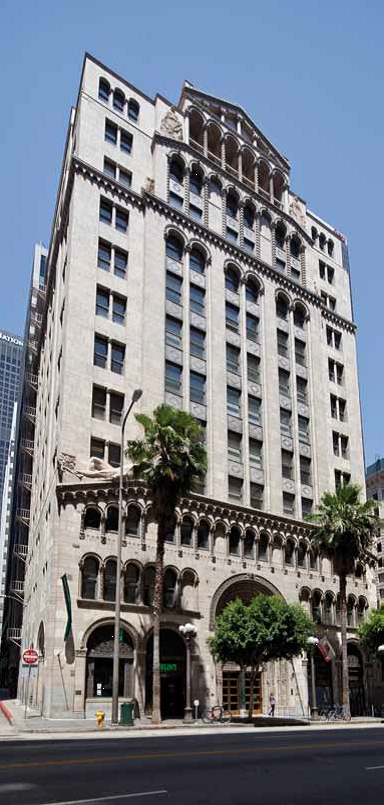
- Fine Arts Building Los Angeles
- Interactive map of Fine Arts Building
- Location: 811 West 7th Street, Los Angeles
- Coordinates: 34.0492°N 118.2590°W
- Built: 1927
- Architect: Walker & Eisen
- Architectural style: Romanesque Revival

Los Angeles Historic-Cultural Monument
- Designated: April 17, 1974
- Reference no.: 125

The landmark Fine Arts Building is located at 811 West 7th Street in Downtown Los Angeles, California. Also known as the Global Marine House, it was declared a historic cultural monument in 1974.

== Architecture ==
The building was designed by the architects Albert Raymond Walker (1881–1958) and Percy Augustus Eisen (1885–1946) in 1927. It is a compact twelve-storey block on a H-shaped layout plan with a façade of smooth and squared slabs of light-colored stone.

=== Façade ===
The first three stories present a striking façade with a trapezoidal profile. The building's streetside elevation is divided into three horizontal registers that echo the classic arrangement of a Renaissance palace in distinct lower, central and upper sections. As in Italian antiquity, the section closest to the viewer is given the greatest architectural definition.

The façade's central axis is emphasized by a large entrance portal, with a rounded arch that rises the height of two storeys. This deep, splayed passageway has an arched lintel decorated with plant motifs that introduces serried ranks of arches on either side. They are resting alternately on small columns and pillars variously decorated with fantastic creatures and inlaid geometric patterns. The wall beneath the great arch is densely worked with volutes of acanthus leaves and concatenated circles simulating rope made entirely of terracotta reliefs. The entrance is divided in two by a column of green marble with a capital and decorated entablature on which the two smaller arches rest.

Echoes of the architecture of the temple and the religious edifice return boldly in the three uppermost storeys, with a double order of arches on spiral columns, capitals decorated with foliage, and keystones with small animal heads. A tympanum with a curious internal colonnade crowns the façade in a riot of minute decoration and majestic architectural sculpture groups.

=== Interior ===
The two-storey interior lobby is set in large wall arches that enclose smaller arches on brackets at the lower level. A large balcony-type gallery is above, with spaces designed for artists’ studios. It is modelled on the matroneum overlooking the nave of a church. A shallow pool adorned with bronze sculptures, by the sculptor Burt Johnson, reflects light in the center of the lobby.

The lobby walls are decorated with ceramic relief panels, small sculptural inserts, and seventeen showcases made of glass and finely chased bronze like reliquaries. They now display a tenants’ paintings, sculptures and artworks.

== History ==
Oil wildcatter Russell E. Havenstrite owned a penthouse in the building. In June 2012, the building was purchased by Sorgente Group of America.

The building appears in the film (500) Days of Summer, where the protagonist — an aspiring architect — describes it as his favorite building.

The lobby has housed art galleries in recent years.

== Gallery ==
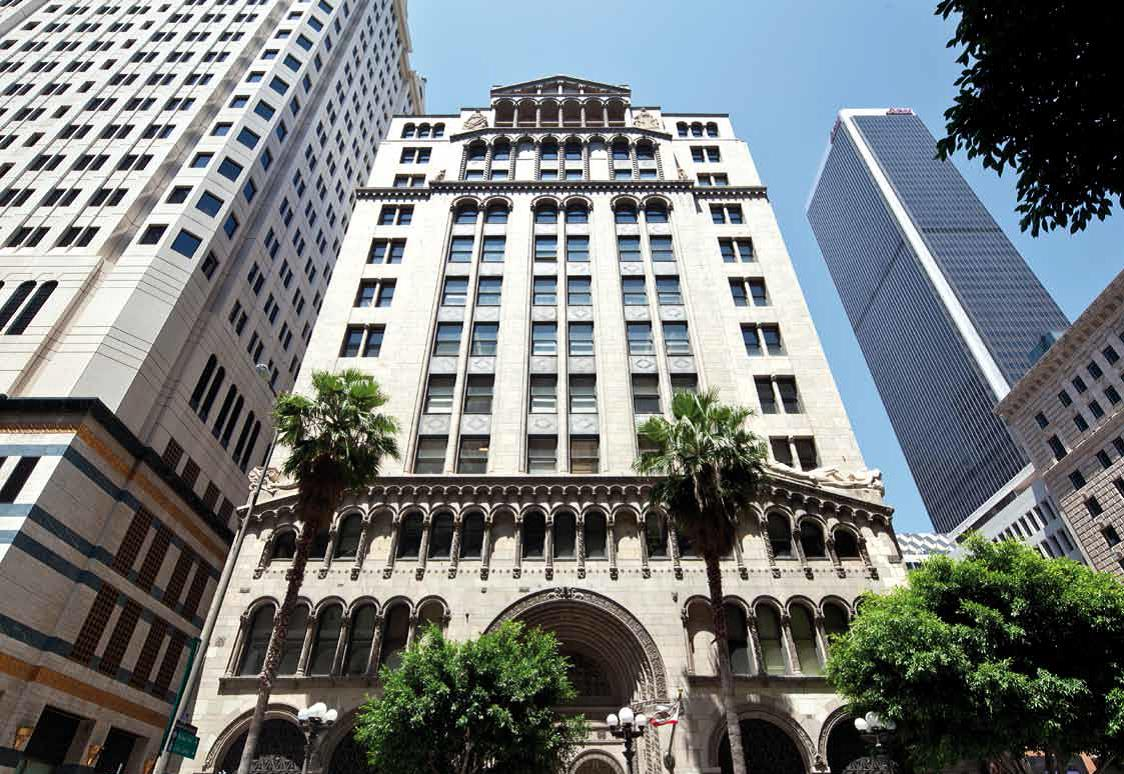
Façade on West 7th Street, Los Angeles

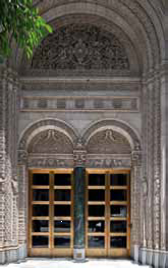
Main entrance on West 7th Street, Los Angeles

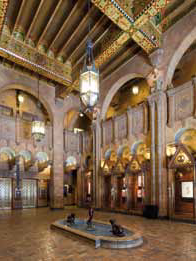
Lobby

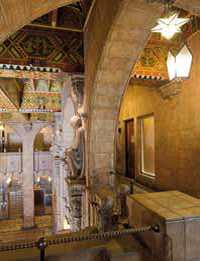
Interior

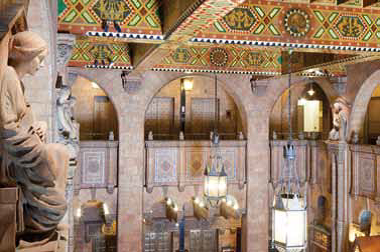
Interior, ceiling

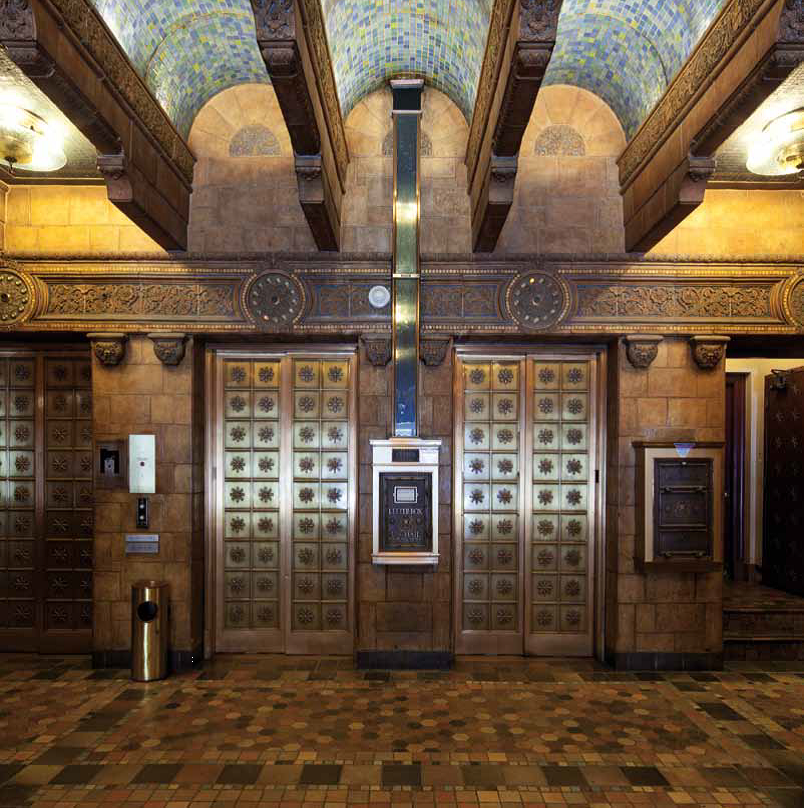
Interior, elevators

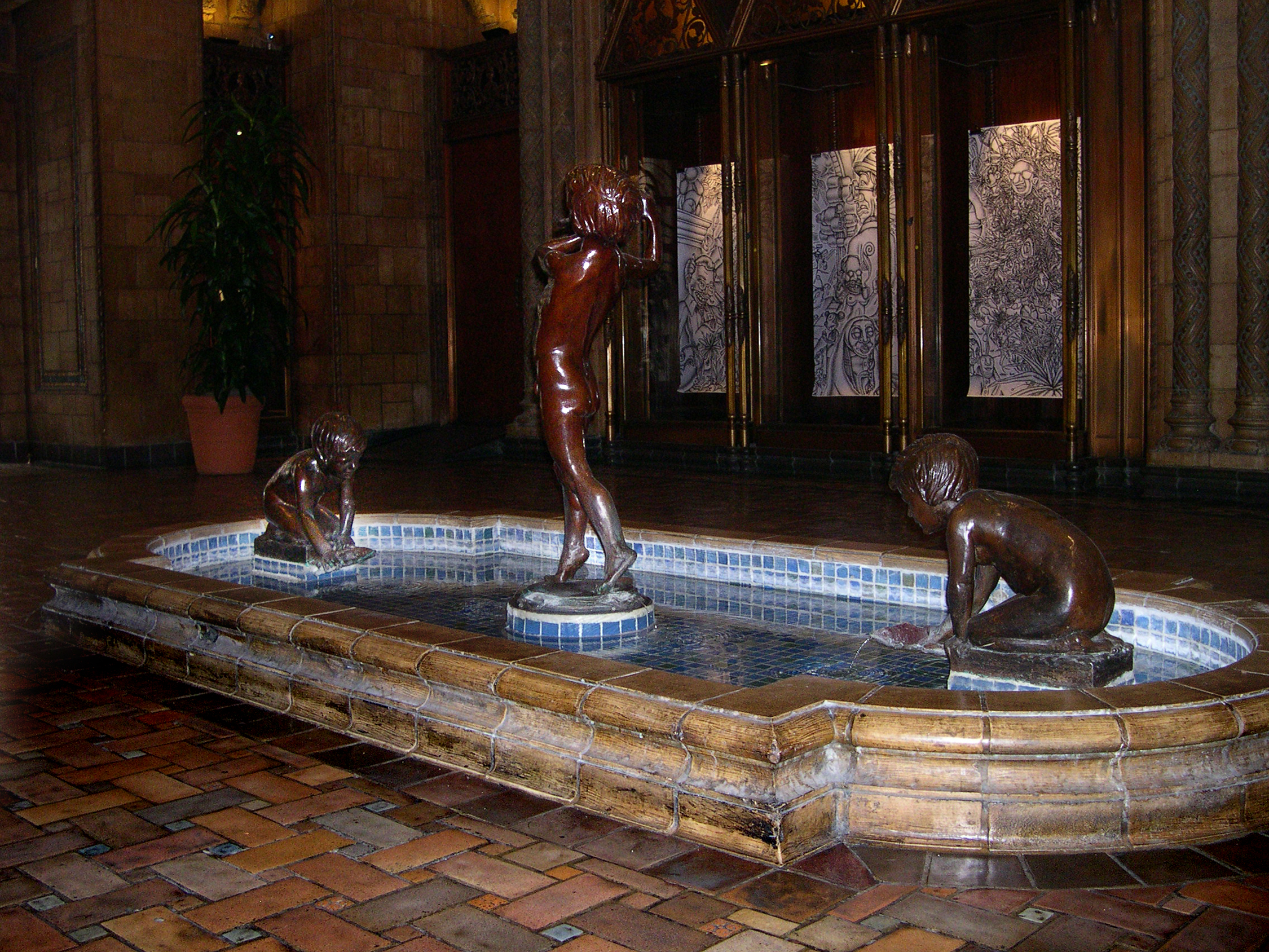
Lobby sculptures and pool

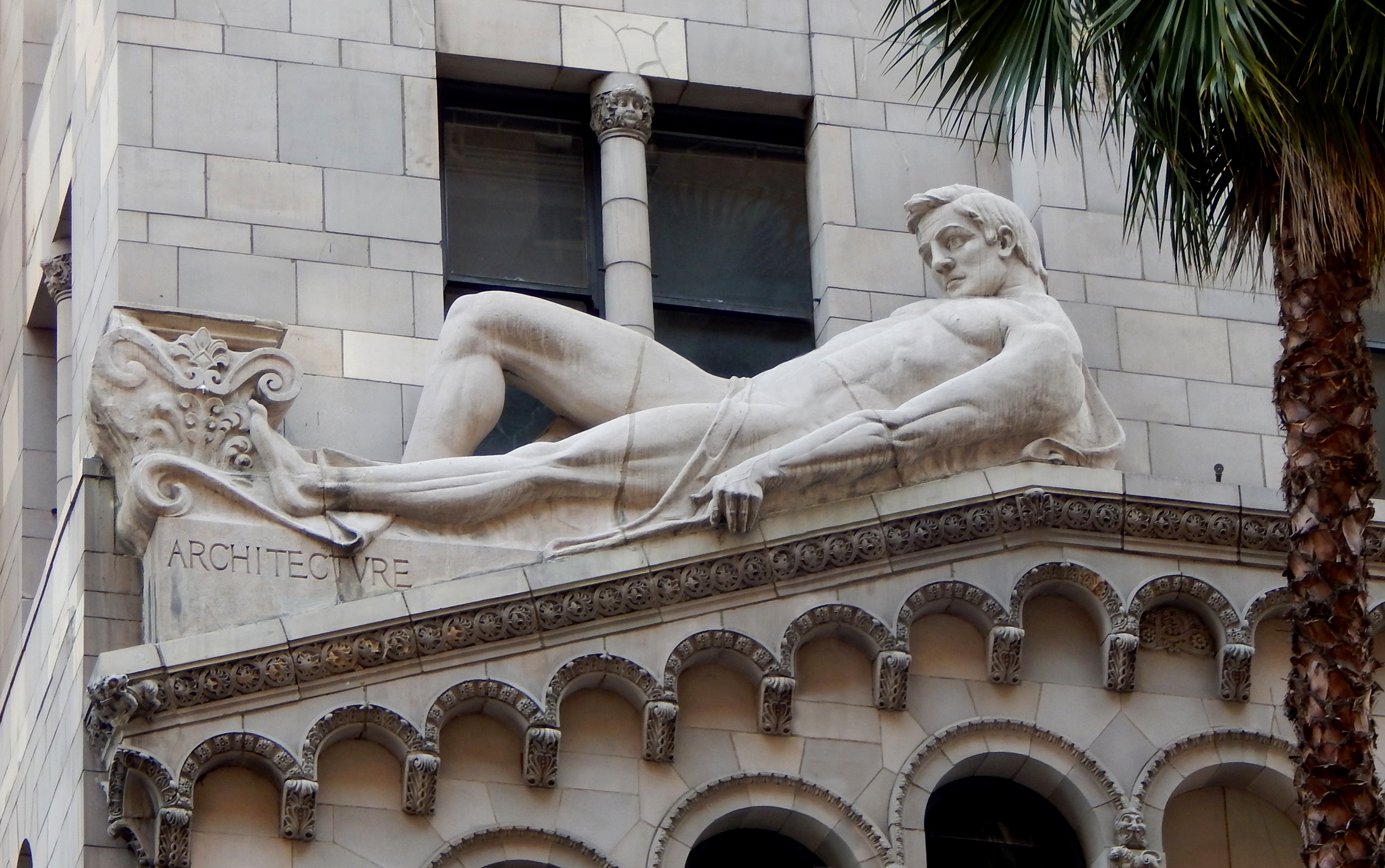
Architecture, façade sculpture at 4th floor, left side

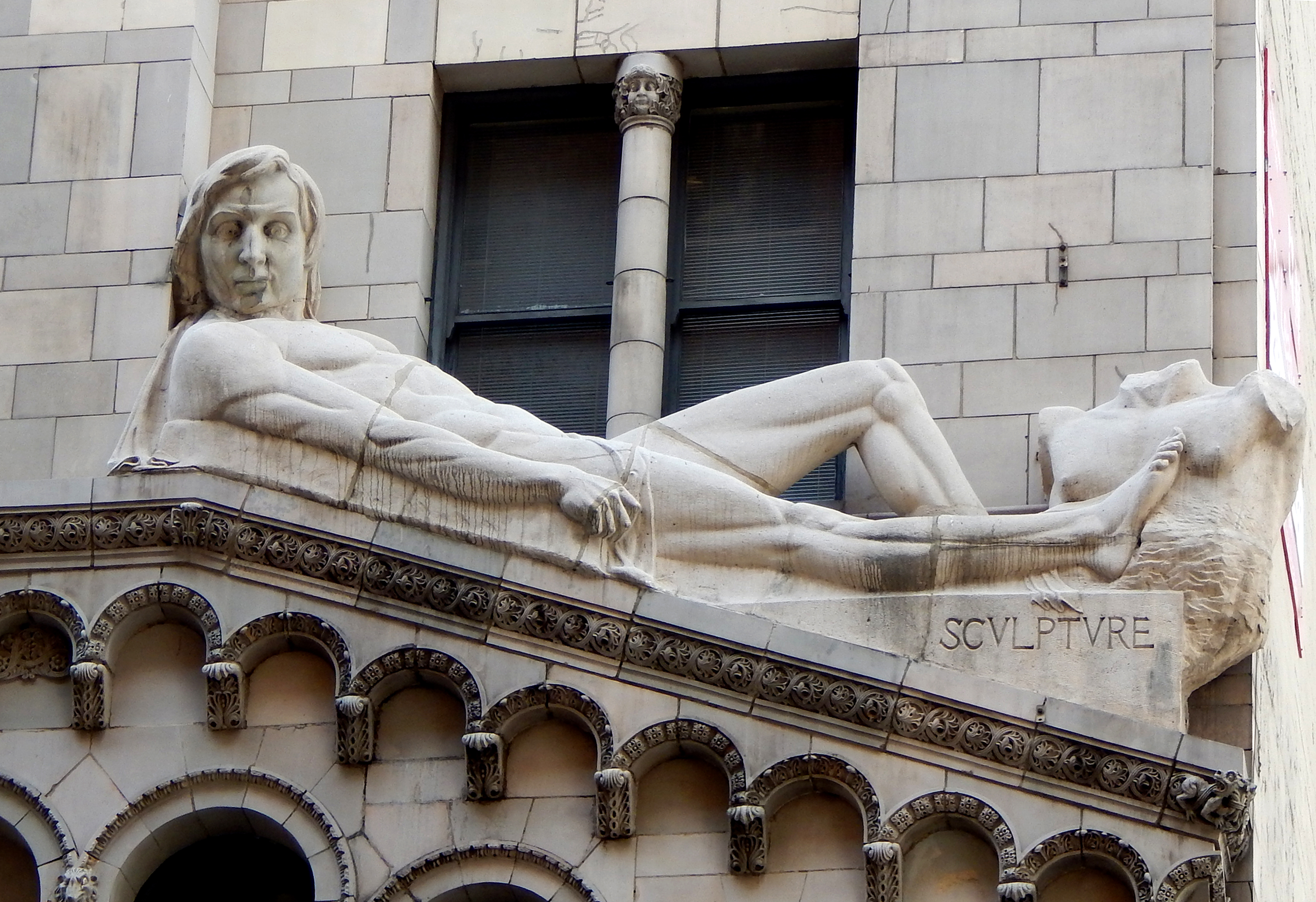
Sculpture, façade sculpture at 4th floor, right side

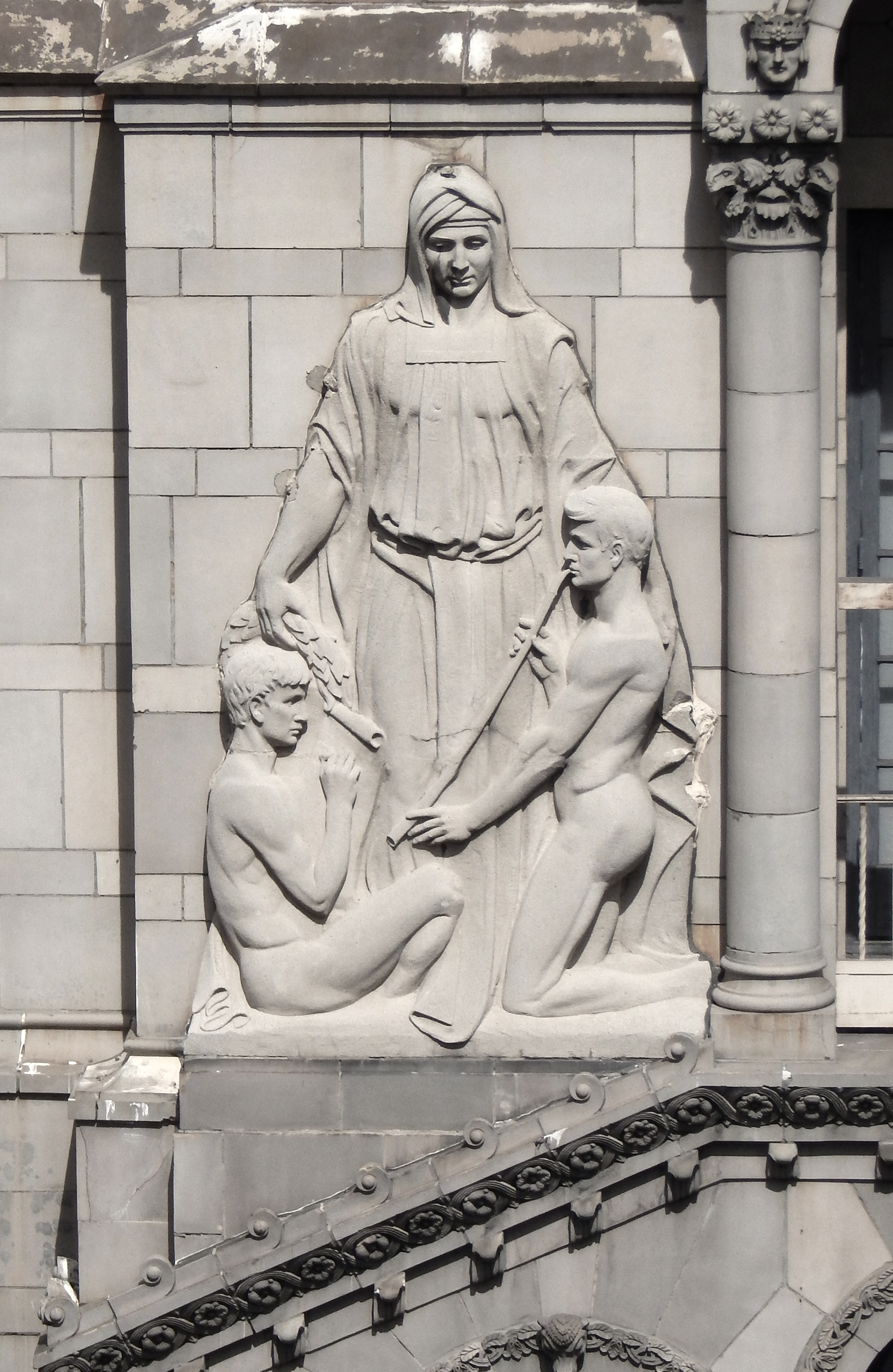
Façade bas relief at top, left side

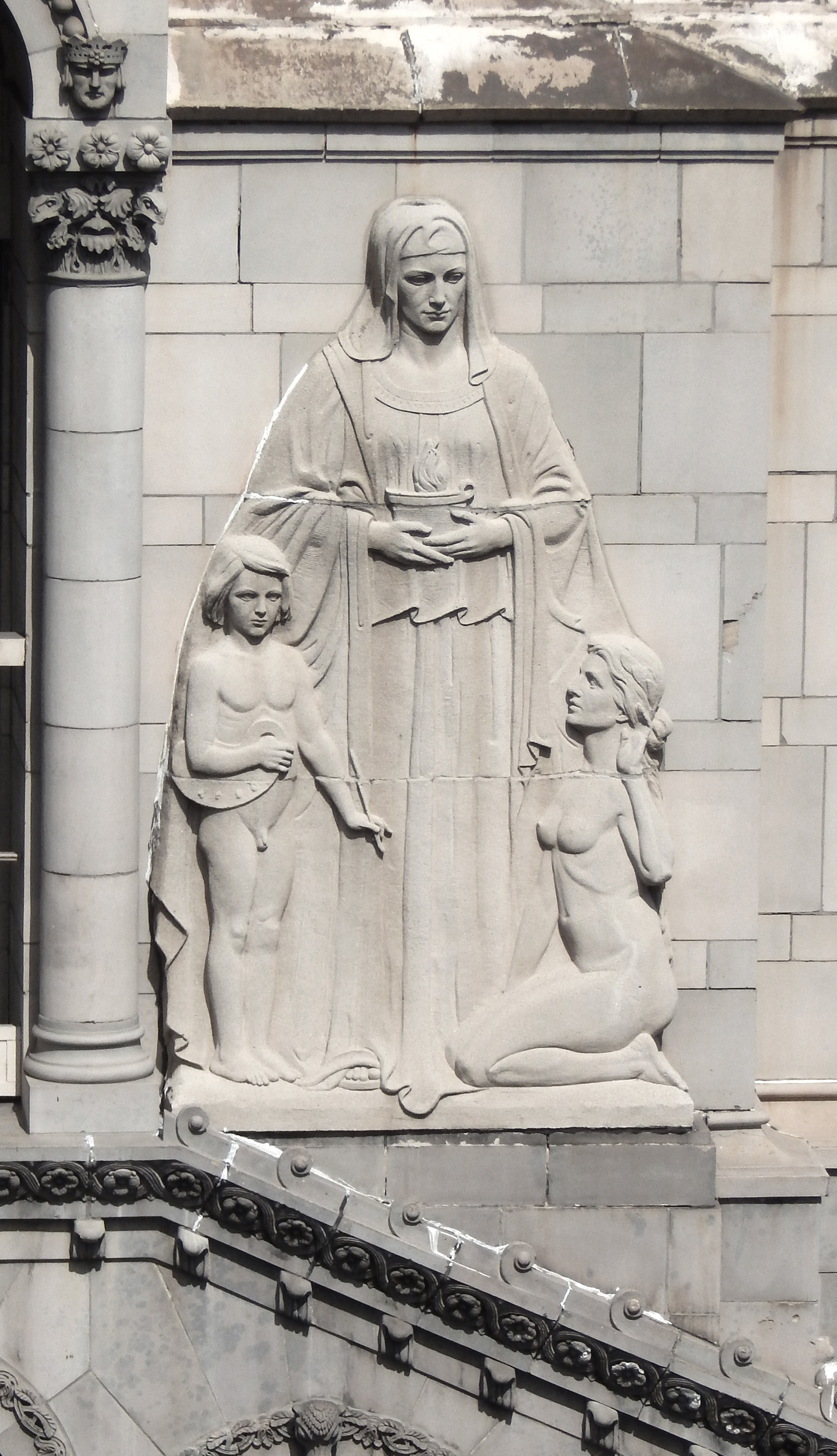
Façade bas relief at top, right side

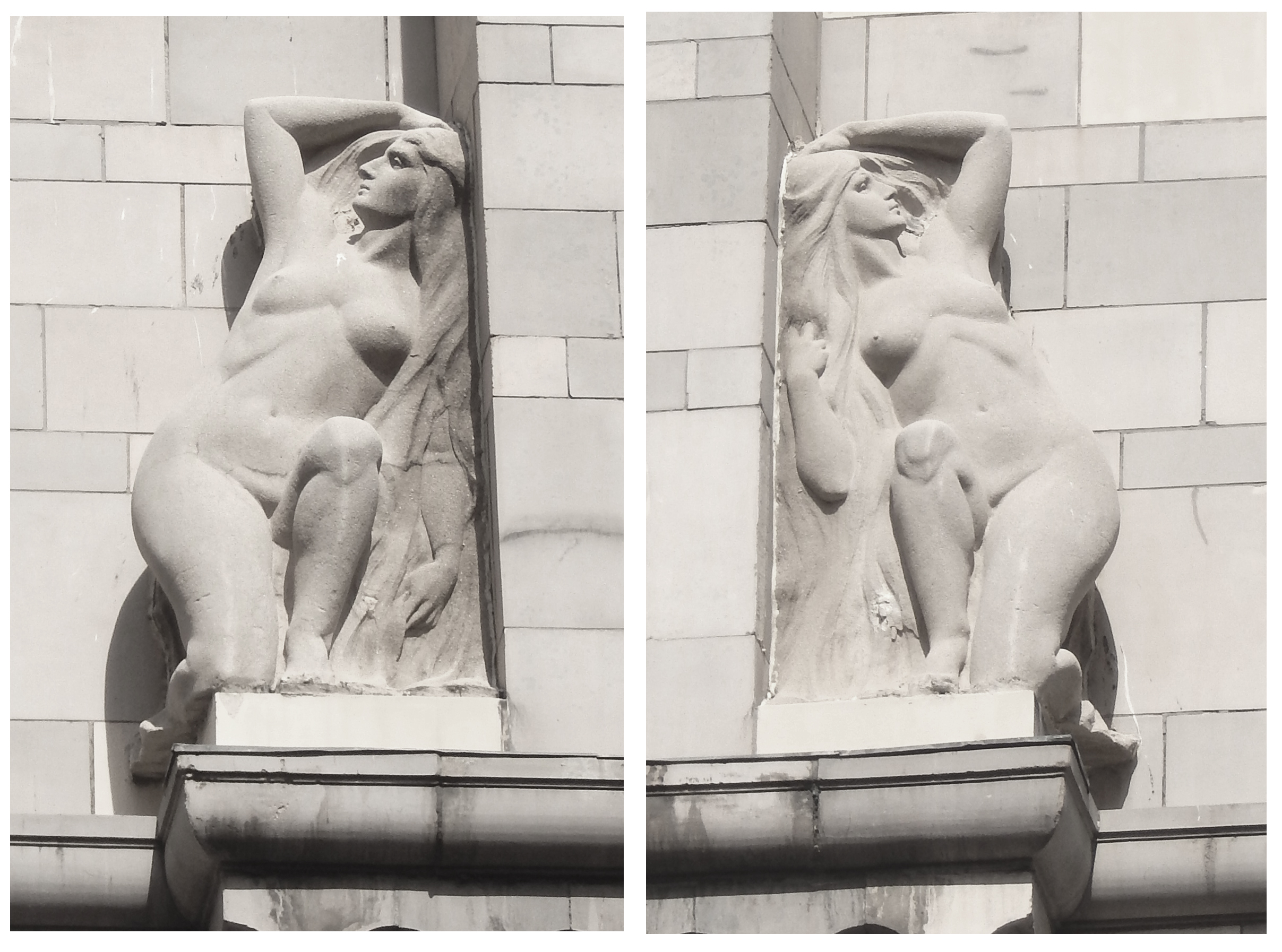
Façade sculptures at 10th floor, left and right sides

== See also ==
- List of Los Angeles Historic-Cultural Monuments in Downtown Los Angeles
