= Valter Mainetti =

Italian businessman

- Born: 28 October 1947 (age 79); Rome, Italy

Valter Mainetti (Rome, 28 October 1947) is an Italian entrepreneur, publisher and business manager, president of Tiberiade Holding owned by a branch of the Mainetti family, president of Società Italiana per le Condotte d'Acqua 1880, President of Musa Comunicazione and Foglio Edizioni, and president of the Fondazione Sorgente Group.

== Biography ==
He graduated in 1973 in Political Science at the Sapienza University in Rome, with Aldo Moro as his thesis supervisor.

In the mid-seventies he began working in the family businesses, in activity since the beginning of the 1900s in Italy and the United States, operating within the industry of iron construction and real estate. His maternal grandfather, Luigi Binda, had founded a company in New York City in 1919 specialized in the assembly of iron structures (amongst the works carried out there are also the Chrysler Building and the expansion of the New York Stock Exchange). Even his paternal family's company had been involved, since 1910, in the realization of works in iron, and then following World War II began building mechanical and industrial plants, such as the Sincrotrone in Frascati, the Alfa Romeo in Arese, the Steelworks in Terni and Taranto.

In 1987 he assumed the leadership of SAGEFIM Partecipazioni Spa, the parent company of the real estate business. The company's activities had gradually been oriented towards social housing.

In 1999, with the introduction in Italy of the law on real estate funds, he completely restructured the businesses both in Italy and in the US under the brand Sorgente Group, which he conceived, directing the activities towards real estate finance and the acquisition of iconic buildings.

As CEO of Sorgente Sgr, in 2001 he launched the first real estate fund, "Michelangelo", intended for institutional investors, with portfolio investments in prestigious buildings such as the Chrysler Building and Flatiron Building in New York City.

Through the funds managed by Sorgente Group, in 2004 Palazzo del Tritone in Rome was acquired. It is now the headquarters of Sorgente Group, hosting on the ground floor the Tritone Exhibition Space.

In 2006 the Palazzo la Rinascente in Piazza Fiume (Rome) was also acquired. This is the only building designed in Rome by Franco Albini, a modern-style work in the historical style of the Capital. The purchase of the Fine Arts Building in Los Angeles dates back to 2012, while the Clock Tower of Santa Monica to 2013. In 2014 a building was acquired in Lungotevere Aventino 4, 5, 6 in Rome, where now locates the headquarters of the Fondazione Sorgente Group.

The Group operates in the finance, building constructions, infrastructures and restoration. By means of a subsidiary 'Musa Comunicazione', the Group also holds 100% shares of the newspaper 'Il Foglio Quotidiano'.

In 2018 the Group companies were 94, including two SGR: Quorum and SORGENTE. The latter 8 January 2019 was placed in Extraordinary Administration by Banca d'Italia, following a dispute with Fondazione ENASARCO, which began in 2015, regarding the management of two funds subscribed by the Fondazione. The Extraordinary Administration finished 8 January 2022, without any sanctions.

In July 2023 he acquired, through Tiberiade Holding, belonging to a branch of his family, the Core branch of the historic construction and major works Company Condotte, relaunching it as Società italiana per le Condotte d'Acqua 1880. The transaction has a total value of 345 million euros (105 million euros as transaction cost and 240 million euros for the replacement of guarantees).

== Other activities ==
Mainetti is a collector of ancient artworks.

Together with the Fondazione Sorgente Group, of which he is president, he collects classical sculptures and antique paintings.

== Honors and awards ==
- Italy: Cavaliere del Lavoro 31 May 2013
- Italy: Honorary Professor from the University of Parma – 16 December 2016

== See also ==
- Sorgente Group

== Further projects ==
Wikiquote contains citations about or regarding Valter Mainetti
