= Acqui Award of History =

The Acqui Award of History (Premio Acqui Storia) is an Italian prize. The prize was founded in 1968 for remembering the victims of the Acqui Military Division who died in Cefalonia (September 13–26, 1943) fighting against the Nazis. The jury is composed of seven members: six full professors of history and a group of sixty (60) ordinary readers who have just one representative (and just one vote) in the jury. The Acqui Award Prize is divided into three sections: history, popular history, and historical novels. A special prize entitled “Witness to the Times,” given to individual personalities known for their cultural contributions and who have distinguished themselves in describing historical events and contemporary society, may also be conferred. Beginning in 2003 special recognition for work in multimedia and iconography--”History through Images”—was instituted.

== Winners of the prize ==
Source: Premio Acqui Storia

=== History section ===
- 1968 - Ivan Palermo - Storia di un armistizio - A. Mondadori
- 1969 - Nicola Tranfaglia - Carlo Rosselli dall’interventismo a Giustizia e Libertà - Laterza
- 1970 - Harrison E. Salisbury - I 900 giorni - L’assedio di Leningrado - Bompiani
- 1971 - Nuto Revelli - L’ultimo Fronte - Einaudi
- 1972 - Ottavio Bariè - Albertini - Utet
- 1973 - Karl D. Bracher - La dittatura tedesca - Il Mulino
- 1974 - Carlo Ghisalberti - Storia costituzionale d’Italia 1849 - 1948 - Laterza
- 1975 - George L. Mosse - La nazionalizzazione delle masse - Il Mulino
- 1976 - Giuseppe Boffa - Storia dell’Unione Sovietica - A. Mondadori
- 1977 - Franco Livorsi - Amadeo Bordiga - Editori Riuniti
- 1978 - Valerio Castronovo - Il Piemonte - Einaudi
- 1979 - Nello Ajello - Intellettuali e PCI 1944 - 1958 - Laterza
- 1980 - Charles S. Maier - La rifondazione dell’Europa borghese - De Donato
- 1981 - Giorgio Vaccarino - Storia della Resistenza in Europa 1938 - 1945 - Feltrinelli
- 1982 - Giorgio Candeloro - Il fascismo e le sue guerre 1922 - 1939 - Feltrinelli
- 1983 - Meir Michaelis - Mussolini e la questione ebraica - Ediz. Comunità
- 1984 - U.B. Alfassio-Grimaldi e Gherardo Bozzetti - Bissolati Rizzoli
- 1985 - Francesco Barbagallo - Nitti - Utet
- 1986 - Ennio Di Nolfo - Le paure e le speranze degli italiani - A. Mondadori
- 1987 - Giorgio Rochat - Italo Balbo - Utet
- 1988 - Andrea Riccardi - Il potere del Papa da Pio XII a Paolo VI - Laterza
- 1989 - Enzo Santarelli - Nenni - Utet
- 1990 - Paul Kennedy - Ascesa e declino delle grandi potenze - Garzanti
- 1990 - Mario Isnenghi - Le guerre degli italiani - A. Mondadori
- 1990 - Arno J. Majer - Soluzione finale - A. Mondadori
- 1991 - Roberto Vivarelli - Storia delle origini del fascismo - Il Mulino
- 1991 - Simona Colarizi - L'opinione degli italiani sotto il regime 1929 - 1943 - Laterza
- 1991 - Carlo Pinzani - Da Roosevelt a Gorbaciov - Ponte alle Grazie
- 1992 - Claudio Pavone - Una guerra civile 1943 - 1945 - Bollati Boringhieri
- 1992 - Mimmo Franzinelli - Il riarmo dello spirito - Pagus
- 1992 - Pietro Scoppola - La repubblica dei partiti - Il Mulino
- 1993 - Giorgio Spini - Le origini del socialismo - Einaudi
- 1993 - Michela De Giorgio - Le italiane dall’Unità a oggi - Laterza
- 1993 - Silvio Lanaro - Storia dell’Italia repubblicana - Marsilio
- 1994 - Enrico Decleva - Mondadori - Utet
- 1994 - Victoria De Grazia - Le donne nel regime fascista - Marsilio
- 1994 - Nicola Labanca - In marcia verso Adua - Einaudi
- 1995 - Giorgio Borsa - Dieci anni che cambiarono il mondo – Corbaccio

=== Scientific History ===
- 1996 - Raul Hilberg - La distruzione degli ebrei d’Europa – Einaudi
- 1997 - Guido Melis - Storia dell’Amministrazione Italiana - Il Mulino
- 1998 – (ex equo) Aga Rossi, Victor Zaslavsky - Togliatti e Stalin - Il Mulino and Maurilio Guasco - La storia del clero – Laterza
- 1999 - Paul Ginsborg - Storia d’Italia 1943–1996. Famiglia, società, Stato – Einaudi
- 2000 - Angelo d'Orsi - La cultura a Torino tra le due guerre – Einaudi
- 2001 - Mark Mazower - Le Ombre dell’Europa. Democrazie e totalitarismi del XX secolo – Garzanti
- 2002 - Jose Pirjevec - Le guerre Jugoslave – Einaudi
- 2003 - Walter Russell Mead - Il serpente e la colomba. Storia della politica estera degli Stati-Uniti d’America – Garzanti
- 2004 - Gaetano Quagliariello - De Gaulle e il gollismo - Il Mulino
- 2005 - Gabriele Hammermann - Gli internati militari italiani in Germania, 1943-1945 - Il Mulino
- 2006 - Sergio Soave - Senza tradirsi, senza tradire - Nino Aragno Editore
- 2007 - Piero Craveri - De Gasperi - Il Mulino
- 2008 - Raimondo Luraghi - La spada e le magnolie. Il Sud nella storia degli Stati Uniti - Donzelli editore
- 2009 - Orazio Cancila - I Florio. Storia di una dinastia imprenditoriale – Bompiani
- 2010 - Alessandro Orsini – Anatomia delle Brigate rosse. Le radici ideologiche del terrorismo rivoluzionario - Rubbettino (English Version by Cornell University Press: Alessandro Orsini, Anatomy of the Red Brigades. The Religious Mindset of Modern Terrorists)
- 2011 - Roberto de Mattei - Il Concilio Vaticano II. Una storia mai scritta - Lindau
- 2012 - Giovanni Tassani - Diplomatico tra due guerre. Vita di Giacomo Paulucci di Calboli Barone - Casa
- 2013 - Maurizio Serra - Malaparte. Vite e leggende - Marsilio Editori; Ottavio Barié - Dalla guerra fredda alla grande crisi. Il nuovo mondo delle relazioni internazionali - Il Mulino
- 2014 - Luciano Mecacci - La Ghirlanda fiorentina e la morte di Giovanni Gentile - Adelphi e Gianpaolo
- 2015 - Franco Cardini - L’appetito dell’Imperatore. Storie e sapori segreti della storia - Mondadori e Paolo Isotta - La virtù dell’elefante. La musica, i libri, gli amici e San Gennaro - Marsilio

=== Popular History ===
- 1996 Miriam Mafai - Botteghe oscure, addio - A. Mondadori
- 1997 Ilaria Porciani - La festa della nazione - Il Mulino
- 1998 Silvio Bertoldi - Il sangue e gli eroi – Rizzoli
- 1999 Antonio Gibelli - La grande guerra degli italiani. 1915-1918 – Santoni
- 2000 Arrigo Petacco - L’esodo - A. Mondadori
- 2001 Alfio Caruso - Italiani dovete morire – Longanesi
- 2002 Pasquale Chessa, Francesco Villari - Interpretazioni su Renzo De Felice - Baldini Castoldi
- 2003 Giampaolo Pansa - I figli dell’Aquila - Sperling & Kupfer
- 2004 Gian Enrico Rusconi - Cefalonia. Quando gli italiani si battono – Einaudi
- 2005 Federico Rampini - Il secolo cinese. Storie di uomini, città e denaro dalla fabbrica del mondo – Mondadori
- 2006 Angelo Del Boca - Italiani, brava gente? - Neri Pozza
- 2007 Mario Calabresi - Spingendo la notte più in là – Mondadori
- 2008 Maurizio Serra - Fratelli Separati. Drieu-Aragon-Malraux Edizioni Settecolori
- 2009 Roberto Riccardi - Sono stato un numero. Alberto Sed racconta – Giuntina
- 2010 Marco Patricelli – Il volontario - Laterza
- 2011 Andrea Vento - In silenzio gioite e soffrite. Storia dei servizi segreti italiani dal Risorgimento alla Guerra fredda - Il Saggiatore
- 2012 Giancarlo Mazzuca e Luciano Foglietta - Sangue romagnolo. I compagni del Duce - Minerva Edizioni
- 2013 Giuseppe Marcenaro - Una sconosciuta moralità. Quando Verlaine sparò a Rimbaud - Bompiani
- 2014 Giancristiano Desiderio - Vita intellettuale e affettiva di Benedetto Croce - Liberilibri
- 2015 Antonio De Rossi - La costruzione delle Alpi. Immagini e scenari del pittoresco alpino (1773-1914) - Donzelli.

=== Historical novel ===
- 2009 Raffaele Nigro – Santa Maria delle battaglie – Rizzoli
- 2010 Antonio Pennacchi – Canale Mussolini - Mondadori
- 2011 Stefano Zecchi - Quando ci batteva forte il cuore - Mondadori
- 2012 Mauro Mazza - L'albero del mondo. Weimar, ottobre 1942 - Fazi Editore
- 2013 Dario Fertilio - L’ultima notte dei fratelli Cervi. Un giallo nel triangolo della morte - Marsilio Editori
- 2014 Vasken Berberian - Sotto un cielo indifferente - Sperling&Kupfer
- 2015 Licia Giaquinto - La Briganta e lo sparviero - Marsilio

=== Witness to the Times ===
- Norberto Bobbio
- Giovanni Spadolini
- Altiero Spinelli
- Giulio Andreotti
- Alessandro Galante Garrone
- Giancarlo Pajetta
- Susanna Agnelli
- Carlo Bo
- Vittorio Foa
- Primo Levi
- Cesare Musatti
- Tullio Regge
- Bartolomeo Sorge
- Umberto Veronesi
- Alberto Cavallari
- Luigi Firpo
- Arrigo Levi
- Piero Ottone
- Franco Della Peruta
- Furio Diaz
- Giuseppe Galasso
- Jean Strarobinski
- Luigi Vittorio Ferraris
- Roberto Gaja
- Egidio Ortona
- Sergio Romano
- Natalia Ginzburg
- Rita Levi-Montalcini
- Margherita Hack
- Lalla Romano
- Adriana Zarri
- Enzo Biagi
- Oreste Del Buono
- Giorgio Fattori
- Luigi Ciotti
- Inge Feltrinelli
- Antonio Tabucchi
- Lietta Tornabuoni
- Ernesto Olivero
- Madre Teresa di Calcutta
- Indro Montanelli
- Alberto Sordi
- Cesare Romiti
- Cino Chiodo
- Giovanni Galliano
- Piero Galliano
- Ercole Tasca
- Marcello Venturi
- Giorgio Forattini
- Barbara Spinelli
- Michail Gorbacëv
- Mike Bongiorno
- Francesco Cossiga
- Marcello Lippi
- Gianluigi Buffon
- Nazionale Italiana di Calcio Campione del Mondo 2006 (2006)
- Claudia Cardinale (2007)
- Alberto Bolaffi (2007)
- Mauro Mazza (2007
- Franco Battiato (2008)
- Vittorio Feltri (2008)
- Rino Fisichella (2008)
- Uto Ughi (2008)
- Gianni Letta (2009)
- Alain Elkann (2009)
- Antonio Paolucci (2009)
- Sandro Bondi (2010)
- Vittorio Messori (2010)
- Massimo Ranieri (2010)
- Marcello Veneziani (2011)
- Brunello Cucinelli (2011)
- Ida Magli (2011)
- Ezio Greggio (2011)
- Bruno Vespa (2012)
- Carlo Verdone (2012)
- Maria Gabriella di Savoia (2012)
- Paola Pitagora (2012)
- Pupi Avati (2013)
- Giampaolo Pansa (2013)
- Roberto Napoletano (2013)
- Pier Francesco Pingitore (2013)
- Livio Berruti (2014)
- Lorella Cuccarini (2014)
- Mario Orfeo (2014)
- Enrico Vanzina (2014)
- Dario Ballantini (2015)
- Pietrangelo Buttafuoco (2015)
- Italo Cucci (2015)
- Maria Rita Parsi (2015)
- Antonio Patuelli (2015)

== See also ==
- List of history awards
