= Conferenza dei Rettori delle Università Italiane =

Association of public and private universities in Italy

The Conferenza dei Rettori delle Università Italiane (CRUI; English: Conference of Italian University Rectors) is an association of public and private universities in Italy. It began in 1963 as a private organization, later becoming an official advisor to the government. The supporting Fondazione CRUI (foundation) formed in 2001. CRUI operates from headquarters at the Piazza Rondanini in the Sant'Eustachio rione of Rome.

== History ==
CRUI has developed several guidelines for policy and implementation of scholarly open access publishing.

Since 2009, it has been the subject of numerous controversies due to a supposed political role and in support of the interests of the category of the rectors that compose it, despite the nature of university association. In particular, it was criticized for its support for the draft of the 1905 Law by Minister Gelmini. The criticisms have sometimes come from some of the rectors themselves.

== Officials ==
The following men have served as presidents of the group.

- 1963-1968: Guido Ferro (Università di Padova)
- 1968-1972: Alessandro Faedo (Università di Pisa)
- 1972-1976: Tito Carnacini (Università di Bologna)
- 1976-1984: Carmine Alfredo Romanzi (Università di Genova)
- 1984-1987: Vincenzo Buonocore (Università di Salerno)
- 1987-1994: Gian Tommaso Scarascia Mugnozza (Università degli Studi della Tuscia)
- 1994-1998: Paolo Blasi (Università di Firenze)
- 1998-2002: Luciano Modica (Università di Pisa)
- 2002-2006: Piero Tosi (Università di Siena)
- 2006-2008: Guido Trombetti (Università degli Studi di Napoli Federico II)
- 2008-2011: Enrico Decleva (Università degli Studi di Milano)
- 2011-2013: Marco Mancini (Università degli Studi della Tuscia)
- 2013-2015: Stefano Paleari (Università degli Studi di Bergamo)
- 2015-2020: Gaetano Manfredi (Università degli Studi di Napoli Federico II)
- 2020-2022: Ferruccio Resta (Politecnico di Milano)
- 2022-2023: Salvatore Cuzzocrea (Università degli studi di Messina)
- 2023-present: Giovanna Iannantuoni (Università di Milano-Bicocca)

== See also ==
- Open access in Italy
- Universities in Italy (in Italian)
- Higher education in Italy
- Rector (academia): Italy
