= Alessandro Orsini =

Alessandro Orsini may refer to:

- Alessandro Orsini (cardinal) (1592–1626), Italian cardinal
- Alessandro Orsini (sociologist) (born 1975), Italian sociologist
