= Alessandro Orsini (sociologist) =

Italian sociologist (born 1975)

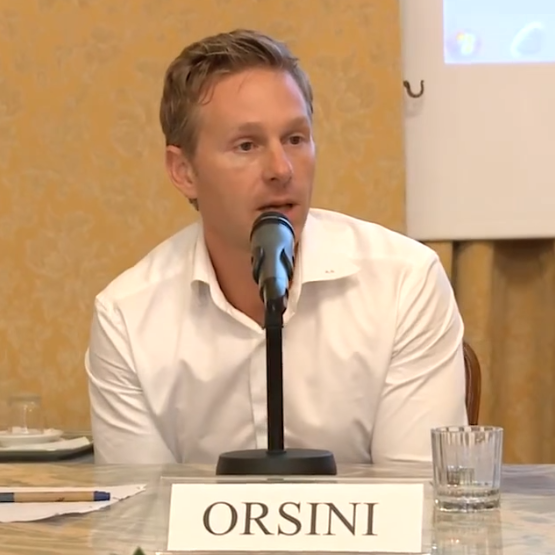
- Orsini in 2013
- Born: 14 April 1975 (age 51); Naples, Italy
- Occupations: Sociologist, writer

Alessandro Orsini (born 14 April 1975) is an Italian sociologist and scholar of terrorism who is an associate professor at LUISS University. He is the author of several works, most notably L'eretico della sinistra (2004), Anatomy of the Red Brigades (2009), and Sacrifice: My Life in a Fascist Militia (2017), attracting both praise and criticism. In the 2020s, he attracted controversy for his views over the Russian invasion of Ukraine and the broader Russo-Ukrainian war.

== Early life and education ==
Orsini was born on 14 April 1975 in Naples, the son of Arturo Orsini, a Jungian psychologist who was later a professor of theory and techniques of personality testing and director of the School of Clinical Psychology at Sapienza University of Rome. When he was fifteen, his family moved to Latina, where he graduated from the Liceo Classico Dante Alighieri. He earned a degree in sociology from Sapienza University followed by a doctorate from Roma Tre University.

== Career ==
In November 2004, Orsini took up a position as a researcher at Libera Università Mediterranea. He had teaching duties, and in 2007, was disciplined by the university for absenteeism. Several well-known sociologists and the Federation of Education Workers union wrote to the university in Orsini's support. He was subsequently a researcher in the sociology of political phenomena at the University of Rome Tor Vergata, where from 2013 to 2016 he directed the Centre for Terrorism Studies, with a focus on Islamist terrorism in Europe. His book on ISIS published by Rizzoli Libri won the Cimitile Prize for best work on a current-affairs topic in 2016.

At LUISS University, Orsini is an associate professor and teaches general sociology and sociology of terrorism. From 2011 to 2022, he was also a research affiliate at the Center for International Studies at MIT, in the United States, where he was a Visiting Scholar at both the Department of Political Science and the Center for International Studies. His research interests focus on "strategies for access to violent groups motivated by ideological hate". He is the founder and director of LUISS University's Observatory on International Security and of the news website Sicurezza Internazionale. He is a member of the scientific advisory board of the journal Studies in Conflict and Terrorism, of the Radicalisation Awareness Network of the Council of Europe, and of the "future scenarios" committee of the Stato maggiore della difesa of the Italian Armed Forces.

From 2019 to 2022, Orsini was a columnist on Il Messaggero, writing articles on geopolitical and international issues. Following the beginning of the Russian invasion of Ukraine, he left Il Messaggero due to conflicts with the editor Massimo Martinelli. He subsequently became a columnist for Il Fatto Quotidiano upon the invitation of the editor Marco Travaglio.

== DRIA model ==
Based on terrorists' biographies, Orsini has developed what he calls the DRIA model (disintegration, reconstruction, integration, alienation) to explain the process of radicalization. Orsini says this analysis applies to "vocational terrorists". He defines these as people prepared to sacrifice their lives for a politico-religious ideology – an ideology that is marked by the belief that the world, as it is, is entirely corrupted ("radical catastrophism") and destined to be destroyed ("waiting for the end"), as well as an obsession with ridding the world of evil, the dehumanization of enemies, the relishing of martyrdom and persecution, and a belief that the end justifies the means. According to Orsini, this activity answers an unmet spiritual need for meaning in terrorists' lives. The model comprises four stages:

- D – disintegration of social identity stage (social marginality). The individual undergoes a crisis in which their previous sense of self is destroyed, leading to a "cognitive opening" and the search for a new way of life. Radicalization is only one possible outcome, and many other healthy developments are possible at this point.
- R – reconstruction of social identity stage (acquisition of "binary code" mentality). The individual comes into contact with and adopts a radical ideology, fundamentally altering their view of the world and the meaning of human life in terms of a struggle between good and evil.
- I – integration in the revolutionary sect stage (entry into a politico-religious group or "community of absolute revolution"). The individual becomes more or less closely affiliated with a terrorist group, be it through actual contact and integration or by imagining themselves to be part of the group (lone wolf).
- A – alienation from the surrounding world stage (detachment from reality). This is the crucial stage that brings the terrorist to a point where they are able to murder others and marks the completion of the radicalization process.

== Works and reception ==
=== L'eretico della sinistra ===
In 2004, Orsini wrote L'eretico della sinistra. Bruno Rizzi élitista democratico, which was published by FrancoAngeli. João Bernardo, a Portuguese historian of communism, capitalism, and fascism, stated that while the book "usefully" discusses the development of Bruno Rizzi's political stances from 1937 on, a topic that has been largely lacking in scholarship, he found the book to be "seriously wanting" by not including the broader debate of critical leftist thoughts on the Soviet Union beyond "Trotsky's views pertaining to the Stalinist USSR". By the omission of multiple other views from Italian political thinkers throughout Rizzi's lifetime and their impact on his thinking, the book creates a "Bruno Rizzi palatable to contemporary taste, expurgating everything of which neoliberals are not fond" and ultimately harms understanding of the individual being presented.

=== Anatomy of the Red Brigades ===
==== Italian edition ====
In 2009, Orsini published a monograph on the motivations of those who joined the Red Brigade, a far-left group, from Rubbettino Editore; it was originally submitted to il Mulino, Italy's premier publisher in social sciences, who rejected it. Spencer M. Di Scala, a historian specialized in Italian socialism, prefaced the book. Orsini uses the Red Brigades as a case study for his view that political homicide, whether coming from the extreme left or from neo-Nazi groups, whether from non-state actors or from groups such as the Pol Pot regime that have taken over the state apparatus, is motivated by a messianic form of thinking. Violent religious or political sects succeed in turning their members into terrorists only to the extent that they succeed in indoctrinating them into believing that the group has a spiritual mission to purify the world of corruption.

Upon publication, Richard Drake, a historian of contemporary Europe, Italian history, and terrorism, characterized Orsini's discussion of the background of the Red Brigades as a "tour de force of intellectual history" in its attempts to explain not only the history of Italian terrorism, but the source of terroristic thought as well. Guido Panvini, a social historian focused on European history and political violence and terrorism, thought the wide range of historical parallels cited by Orsini, while offering many insights, might leave the reader somewhat disorientated but found the link Orsini had established between terrorist violence and the behaviour of right-wing radicals and totalitarian regimes particularly interesting. The work went on to win the Acqui Award of History.

==== English translation ====
Two years later, a translation was published by Cornell University Press. This received quite mixed reviews: while some highlighted its contribution to understanding terrorists' mindset, others criticized, in particular, a lack of historicism. Lawrence Freedman, a scholar in strategic studies and resident reviewer for Foreign Affairs, included the work in his choice of the top three titles on "military, scientific, and technological" topics published in 2011, while R. J. B. Bosworth, a historian specializing in Fascist Italy, panned the book and attributed its positive reception in Italy to pro-Silvio Berlusconi sentiments. Anna Cento Bull, a professor of Italian history, politics, and fascism, found Orsini's conclusions provocative but "too one-sided to be convincing" in that they were marked by a total disregard not only for the historical and cultural context that gave rise to the Red Brigade but also the group's evolution over time; his usage of interviews and internal documents as objective sources also drew criticism.

Tobias Hof, a historian of European terrorism, raised similar issues, writing that although it offered a "stimulating insight" into the mindset of the Red Brigades, it lacked "thorough historical contextualisation" and neglected "the political and social background as well as the historic tradition of violence in Italy", thereby potentially overgeneralizing the phenomenon of radicalization. Much the same critique was made by Ryan Shaffer, a historian focused on Asian and European history with a particular interest in extremism and political violence, although he thought that despite these shortcomings, the book provided an "insightful look at the mindset of modern political terrorists" and gave scholars "a theoretical model to explain an individual's route from marginal existence to 'revolutionary' action". Brian Sandberg, specializing in the intersections of religion, violence, and European political culture, found Orsini to have adopted a "completely ahistorical approach", adding that his failure to interrogate his source materials and superficial readings led him to problematic generalizations.

Gearóid Barry, a historian of pacifism and religion in interwar Europe, found Orsini's portrayal of the historical lineage of the Red Brigades "deeply problematic" because it ignored the role the "Christian Democrats' hegemony" had played in the group's formation; discussing Orsini's attempt to portray the Red Brigades as firmly within the tradition of Italian Communism rather than communists who had "gone bad", Barry said "the tone of sorrowing indignation adopted by Orsini cannot hide the weaker points in his circular arguments". Phil Edwards, a historian specializing in Italian radicalism, was scathing in his assessment—Orsini's analysis was "deliberately ahistorical", shaded by pro-right political partisanship, and his usage of primary sources, marked by an inquisitorial tendency and selective quoting, had no regard for either context or accuracy; the end result, despite some genuinely interesting material on radicalization, was not an "anatomy" of the Red Brigades but an "anathema".

Julian Bourg, specializing in intellectual histories of European terrorism, panned the book; Orsini relied on "dehistoricized political theology to explain wildly dissimilar worldly phenomena"—going so far as to claim that Müntzer, Robespierre, Mao, and Brigadist Mario Moretti shared the same worldview—and like early 20th-century philosophers, located the root cause of all political dilemmas in the religious sphere. John Veugelers, specializing in Italian far-right and social movements, found the book frustrating; he said the central argument of the book stood on cherry-picked evidence, the historical and cultural context was lacking in that the influences of the Catholic Church and the Italian Civil War did not feature at all, and Orsini's theoretical apparatus was decades old, having had its heyday in the 1960s.

Jeffrey Herf, a historian specializing in European history and communism during the Cold War, was more critical of these imperatives of historicism, calling the work a "welcome turn away from social science reductionism"; for Herf, the primary sources Orsini uncovered were invaluable as they allowed him to show how "eschatological ideology" rather than "material concerns" can motivate violence. Likewise, Paul J. Smith, a professor of National Security Affairs, described the book as a "powerful and sweeping study" that provided an "explanatory framework" for the Red Brigades' actions and motivations and made an "enormous contribution" to the field.

John R. Hall, a professor of sociology at the University of California, Davis, said he found Orsini's analysis of the Red Brigades as a quasi-religious "active sect" convincing and consistent with his own analysis of utopian movements. Hall concluded that the book offered "a compelling and descriptively thick portrait of religious terrorism as a type of organized social action." Soma Chaudhuri, a sociologist studying gender, social movements, and violence, said Orsini had analyzed the process by which ordinary people become killers through the concept of a "pedagogy of intolerance"—an "apocalyptic vision of history" where the world is seen as ruled by enemies of humanity—"pigs". She concluded: "This is a uniquely organized book, and it is my assessment that scholars in the future will be comparing it with Christopher Browning's monograph on Nazi holocaust, Ordinary Men." Alex P. Schmid of the International Centre for Counter-Terrorism (ICCT) praised the book as an "excellent" work in 2014 and highlighted it as an example of an increasing number of good researchers joining the field.

=== Sacrifice: My Life in a Fascist Militia ===
In the early 2010s, Orsini embedded himself within two fascist militias for a span of three months to gain an auto-ethnographic perspective, later published as Sacrifice: My Life in a Fascist Militia. R. J. B. Bosworth found the work to be an uncritical portrayal that was quite sympathetic towards fascists. Christiane Olivo, specializing in the politics of social dissent in post-Communist East-Central Europe, was struck by Orsini's first-hand description of the rupture with the ambient "bourgeois ideology" of conflict-avoidance and self-preservation that resulted from the fascist groups' emphasis on the practice of combat sports like MMA, which instilled values of self-sacrifice and encouraged seeking out violent conflict (by brawling with far-left groups) as a valorous way of life.

== Views ==
=== Russo-Ukrainian war ===
Orsini had a rapid rise in popularity as a controversial talk-show guest during the Russian invasion of Ukraine, where he repeatedly expressed his criticism of the enlargement of NATO and its expansionism towards Russia and the European Union's diplomatic failure, which he considers to be co-factors of the war in Ukraine. Although Orsini also condemned Russian aggression against Ukraine, he was criticized for spreading Russian propaganda. His views were broadcast on Italian media through his many appearances, which in turn raised his profile. LUISS University, fearing reputational harms, issued a statement in 2022 expressing its "full solidarity with the Ukrainian people".

In March 2024, Orsini wrote an article in Il Fatto Quotidiano stating that Italian soldiers and vehicles were on duty at the Constanța base in Romania and that they were in imminent danger from a Ukrainian military defeat. The Italian Ministry of Defence rejected the claims stating that Orsini's statements were "completely false. The Italian Air Force servicemen, who were part of the Task Force 'Gladiator' in Constanța, returned to Italy as early as 31 July 2023", adding that "Orsini is either in absolute bad faith or he is not even able to consult normal web sources."

=== Italian affairs ===
In June 2023, Orsini endorsed a law proposed by the Meloni government prohibiting the creation of mosques in garages and sheds. He argued that the law was intended to encourage Muslims to gather in large mosques and thus to prevent isolation and radicalization.

== Books ==
- — (2002). Ripensare la nazione [Rethink the Nation] (in Italian). Seam. p. 183. ISBN 978-88-8179-412-6.
- — (2003). Alle origini del nazionalismo [At the Origins of Nationalism] (in Italian). Kappa. p. 184. ISBN 978-88-7890-502-3.
- — (2004). L'eretico della sinistra. Bruno Rizzi élitista democratico [The Heretic of the Left: Bruno Rizzi Democratic Elitist] (in Italian). FrancoAngeli. p. 176. ISBN 978-88-464-5286-3.
- — (2005). In difesa della sociologia storica [In Defense of Historical Sociology] (in Italian). FrancoAngeli. p. 182. ISBN 978-88-464-6520-7.
- — (2008). Le origini del capitalismo. Storia e interpretazioni [The Origins of Capitalism: History and Interpretations] (in Italian). Marco. p. 324. ISBN 978-88-88897-26-4.
- — (2009). Anatomia delle Brigate rosse. Le radici ideologiche del terrorismo rivoluzionario [Anatomy of the Red Brigades: The Religious Mind-set of Modern Terrorists] (in Italian). Rubbettino. p. 456. ISBN 978-88-498-2491-9. Translated by Sarah J. Nodes (2011) and published by the Cornell University Press.
- — (2010). Il rivoluzionario-benestante. Strategie cognitive per sentirsi migliori degli altri [The Revolutionary-Wealthy: Cognitive Strategies to Feel Better than Others] (in Italian). Rubbettino. p. 81. ISBN 978-88-498-2701-9.
- — (2012). Gramsci e Turati. Le due sinistre [Gramsci and Turati: The Two Lefts] (in Italian). Rubbettino. p. 147. ISBN 978-88-498-3214-3.
- —; Ferrero, Guglielmo (2013). Le due rivoluzioni francesi [The Two French Revolutions] (in Italian). Rubbettino. p. 182. ISBN 978-88-498-3247-1.
- — (2016). ISIS. I terroristi più fortunati del mondo e tutto ciò che è stato fatto per favorirli [ISIS: The Luckiest Terrorists in the World and All that Has Been Done to Favour Them] (in Italian). Rizzoli Libri. p. 256. ISBN 978-88-586-4703-5.
- — (2017). Sacrifice: My Life in a Fascist Militia. Cornell University Press. p. 228. ISBN 978-1-5017-1227-2.
- — (2018). L'Isis non è morto. Ha solo cambiato pelle [ISIS Is not Dead: It Just Shed its Skin] (in Italian). Rizzoli Libri. p. 235. ISBN 978-88-17-09969-1.
- — (2019). Viva gli immigrati! [Long Live the Immigrants!] (in Italian). Rizzoli Libri. p. 224. ISBN 978-88-586-9721-4.
- — (2021). Teoria sociologica classica e contemporanea [Classical and Contemporary Sociological Theory] (in Italian). UTET University. p. 716. ISBN 978-88-6008-677-8.
- — (2022). Ucraina. Critica della politica internazionale [Ukraine: Critique of International Politics] (in Italian). PaperFIRST. p. 305. ISBN 978-88-31431-87-3.
- — (2025). Gaza Meloni. La politica estera di uno Stato satellite [Gaza Meloni: The Foreign Policy of a Satellite State] (in Italian). Piemme. p. 256. ISBN 979-1223800942.
