= Furio Colombo =

Italian journalist and politician (1931–2025)

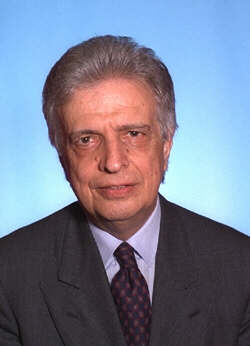
- Colombo in 1996

Member of the Chamber of Deputies
- In office 29 April 2008 – 14 March 2013
- Constituency: Piedmont
- In office 9 May 1996 – 29 May 2001
- Constituency: Turin

Member of the Senate of the Republic
- In office 28 April 2006 – 28 April 2008
- Constituency: Lombardy

Personal details
- Born: 1 January 1931 Châtillon, Italy
- Died: 14 January 2025 (aged 94) Rome, Italy
- Party: PDS (1991–1998); DS (1998–2007); PD (2007–2013); NRPTT (2015–2025)
- Education: University of Turin
- Occupation: Journalist, politician, academic

Furio Colombo (1 January 1931 – 14 January 2025) was an Italian journalist and politician. He started his career in the mid-1950s, working with RAI. In the late 1980s, after moving to New York, he worked as a correspondent for La Stampa and La Repubblica. He wrote for various newspapers and taught at the University of Bologna, Columbia University, and the University of California, Berkeley, at different phases of his life, and served as the director of the Italian Cultural Institute in New York City.

He then served as the editor-in-chief of L'Unità, an Italian leftist newspaper, before leaving due to criticism he faced for his excessive independence from the party line. He later cofounded and became a columnist for Il Fatto Quotidiano, from which he resigned during the Russian invasion of Ukraine because he said the paper had taken a pro-Russian stance and in protest of the hiring of Alessandro Orsini. He died on 14 January 2025.

== Life and career ==
=== Journalistic and academic career ===
Colombo was born in Châtillon, Aosta Valley, into a Jewish family. In the mid-1950s, he started working for the Italian national broadcasting corporation RAI, where he collaborated on the creation of cultural radio and television programs, documentaries and journalistic reportage. In the early 1970s, Colombo taught "Theory and Techniques of Media" and "Radio and Television Language" in the newly founded Department of Art, Music and Entertainment at the University of Bologna.

In the late 1980s, Colombo moved to New York, where he worked as a correspondent from the United States for La Stampa and La Repubblica, of which he has been a columnist. He wrote for The New York Times and the New York Review of Books, and taught journalism at the Columbia University and the University of California, Berkeley. From 1991 to 1994, he was the director of the Italian Cultural Institute in New York City.

From 2001 to 2005, Colombo was the editor-in-chief of the left-wing newspaper L'Unità. According to Marco Travaglio, Colombo left the paper after four years due to the objections by leading personalities from the Democrats of the Left (DS) party to what they saw as his excessive autonomy from the party line.

From 2006 to 2022, Colombo was a columnist for Il Fatto Quotidiano, which he co-founded. Following the start of the Russian invasion of Ukraine, Colombo said the paper had taken a pro-Russian stance, and resigned from the paper due to its hiring of Alessandro Orsini. He was also critical of the theories of Massimo Fini, a fellow columnist, on the German occupation of Italy during World War II.

=== Political career ===
Colombo was elected to the Italian Chamber of Deputies in 1996 with the Democratic Party of the Left (PDS) and in 2008 with the Democratic Party (PD), and to the Italian Senate in 2006 with the DS. After the 2008 Italian general election, Colombo became a member of the Foreign Affairs Committee of the Chamber of Deputies. From 2011, with the death of Mirko Tremaglia, until the end of the legislature in 2013, Colombo was the oldest Deputy of the 16th Legislature. On 16 July 2007, with an article published on L'Unità, Colombo announced his candidacy for the PD secretariat, focusing on strong criticism of Silvio Berlusconi. By 1 August 2007, he gave up his candidacy, just as Antonio Di Pietro and Marco Pannella did, due to excessively bureaucratic rules that made it difficult to advance his candidacy. On 2 May 2015, on occasion of Pannella's 85th birthday, Colombo joined the Transnational Radical Party (NRPTT).

=== Death ===
Colombo died in Rome on 14 January 2025, at the age of 94.
