= Pino Grimaldi =

Italian designer and academic (1948–2020)

Pino Grimaldi, born Giuseppe Grimaldi (16 April 1948 – 22 March 2020), was an Italian designer and academic.

== Biography ==
Grimaldi, born in Salerno in 1948, studied at the University of Salerno, but carried out his activity mainly in Naples. He was a member of the national board and honorary member of AIAP – Associazione Italiana design della comunicazione visiva – and a member of the BEDA, Bureau of European Designers Associations, register of European designers. He dealt with communication design and political graphics by attending a course at PCI school of Frattocchie, at the invitation of Michele Santoro. In 1973 he founded the "Studio Segno" (which in 1984 would become "Segno Associati") along with designer and artist Gelsomino D'Ambrosio.

Some of his works were published in Prima Biennale della Grafica. Propaganda e cultura: indagine sul manifesto di pubblica utilità dagli anni '70 ad oggi, edited by Giovanni Anceschi, Arnoldo Mondadori Editore, Milano, 1984; Fioravanti G., Passarelli L., Sfligiotti S., La grafica in Italia, Leonardo, Milano, 1997; Grafica utile, il manifesto di pubblica utilità dal 1975 al 2000, edited by Luciano Cheles, Mediateca, Poitiers 2000.

He was among the protagonists of the debate on the disciplinary foundation of Italian graphic design, together with D'Ambrosio himself; in 1984 he conceived and designed the magazine "Grafica. Teoria, storia e metodologia" (19851995, sponsored by AIAP from 1985 to 1993), trying to provide a solid disciplinary corpus to graphic design. In 1989 he was among the creators and promoters of the "Carta del Progetto Grafico" in Aosta.

From 1993 he taught Experimental Research Design at the Higher Institute for Artistic Industries of Urbino. He was a consultant for the Higher Institute of Design in Naples, and created the Communication Design course. In 1993 he obtained the chair of Industrial Design at the University of Salerno and, in 1995, that of Business communication project at the Faculty of Architecture of the Second University of Naples, present-day Università degli Studi della Campania Luigi Vanvitelli.

From 2005 to 2007 he directed the Industrial Design course at the SDOA Business School in Vietri sul Mare. He also taught design methodology at the Accademia di Belle Arti di Napoli.

In 2007 he elaborated the concept of blur design, in the book Dalla grafica al blur design, presented for the first time at the 2008 conference "Estetica e marketing".

After interrupting the publication of the magazine Grafica following the death of Gelsomino D'Ambrosio in 2006, Grimaldi decided, in 2009, to leave Segno Associati to found a new communication company called "Blur Design".

In 2018 he published his last book, Blur design. Il branding invisibile (Fausto Lupetti Editore). Subsequently he devoted himself to the preparation of a personal photographic exhibition, which remained unfinished owing to his sudden death.

Grimaldi died in Maddaloni on 22 March 2020, aged 71, of complications caused by SARS-CoV-2 during the COVID-19 pandemic in Italy.

== Books ==
- Prove di Stampa. Riflessioni e materiali di progettazione grafica (with G. D'Ambrosio), Kappa Editore, Rome, 1983
- Lo Studio grafico. Da Gutenberg al Piano d'Identità visiva (with G. D'Ambrosio), Edizioni 10/17, Salerno, 1995
- Il Piano di Comunicazione nella piccola e media impresa. Di tutto quello che non cambia nell'era digitale, FrancoAngeli, Milan, 2004
- Segni e disegni 2. Manuale di disegno grafico, (with M. Privitera), Clitt, Rome, 2005
- Segni e disegni 3. Manuale di disegno grafico, (with M. Privitera), Clitt, Rome, 2006
- Dalla grafica al blur design. La comunicazione visiva in Campania, Mondadori Electa, Naples, 2007
- Blur design. Per Mino, Edizioni 10/17, Salerno, 2009
- Blur design. Il branding invisibile, Fausto Lupetti Editore, Bologna, 2018
