= Antonio Pennacchi =

Italian writer (1950–2021)

Antonio Pennacchi (26 January 1950 – 3 August 2021) was an Italian writer, winner of the Strega Prize in 2010 for his novel, Canale Mussolini.

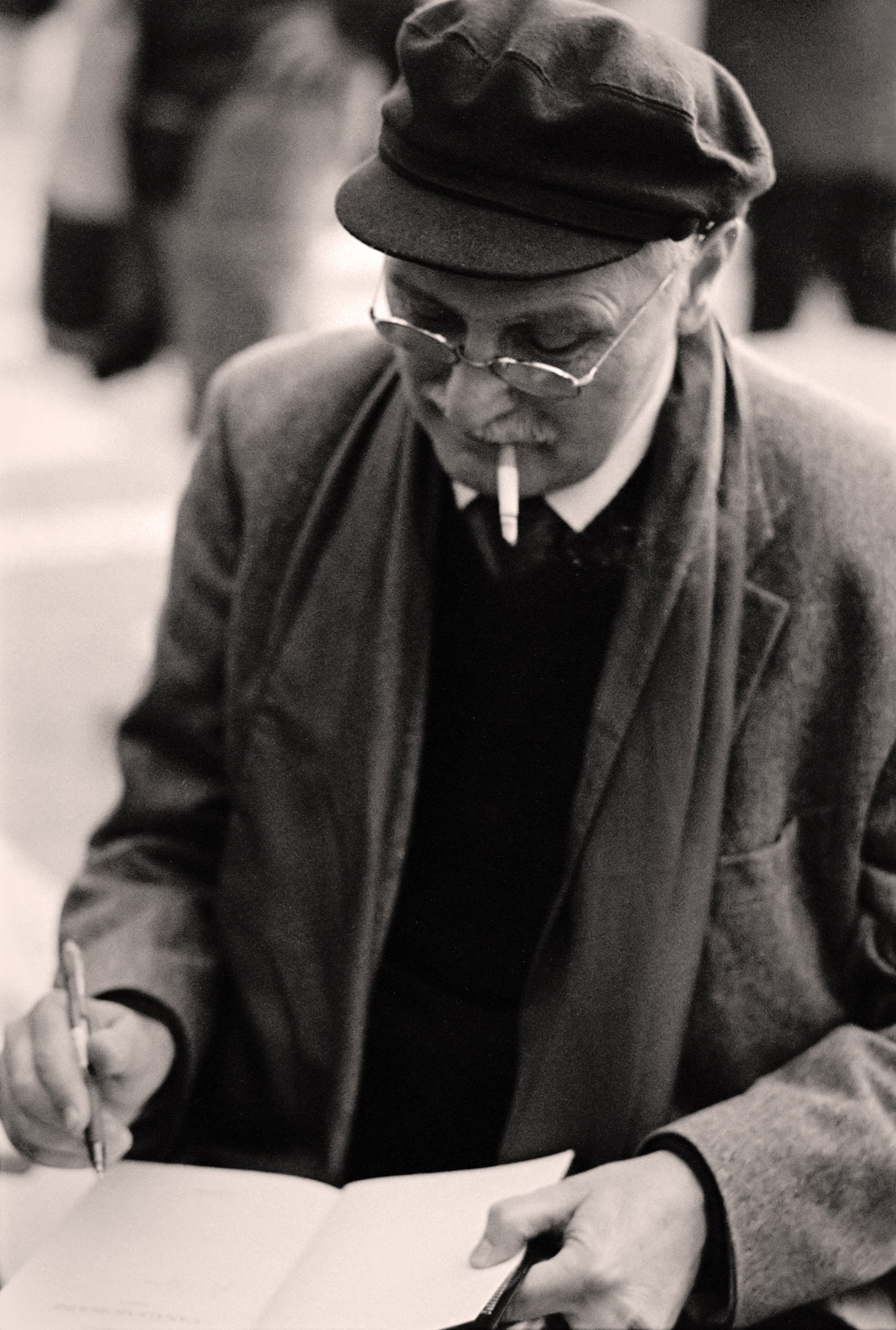
Antonio Pennacchi (2010)

== Biography ==
Born in Latina in a family of workers from Umbria (on the paternal side) and of settlers from Veneto (on the maternal side), who arrived in Lazio for the reclamation of the Agro Pontino, Pennacchi was part of a large family with seven children, including the journalist Gianni Pennacchi and the economist and politician Laura Pennacchi. He devoted himself to politics from an early age, but, unlike his brothers, who all adhered to left-wing organizations, he enrolled in the Italian Social Movement, a neo-fascist nationalist and national-conservative party. However, while increasing his political culture, he rejected the neo-fascist ideology, came into conflict with the party leaders and was expelled. After a long reflection, he approached Marxism and converted to Communism, joining the Italian (Marxist–Leninist) Communist Party and participating in the Protests of 1968.

In the meantime, he began working as a worker at the Alcatel Cavi in Latina (at the time called "Fulgorcavi"), where he remained for over thirty years. At the end of the seventies, he entered the Italian Socialist Party and in the CGIL, from which he was expelled. He then joined the UIL and moved to the Italian Communist Party and back to the CGIL, from which he was expelled again in 1983. He then left politics and graduated in literature at the Sapienza University of Rome, starting his activity as a writer.

His debut novel, Mammut, received 55 rejections from 33 publishers before being published by Donzelli in 1994, winning the Premio del Giovedì Marisa Rusconi. In 1995 he wrote Palude, winner of the Premio nazionale letterario Pisa, dedicated to the city of Latina. He then wrote A red cloud in 1998, a story inspired by the murder of a young couple in Cori, which took place the year before and had great prominence in the national news.

In 2001 he left the publisher Donzelli and moved to the Arnoldo Mondadori Editore. In 2003, the autobiographical Il fasciocomunista was released, winning the Premio Napoli. The film was adapted into a movie, titled My Brother Is an Only Child directed by Daniele Luchetti. The film was a success at the box office and won a special award at the Cannes Film Festival, but Pennacchi has strongly argued with the director, as in the second part of the film the plot of the book was changed. Also in 2001, the essays Viaggio per le città del Duce were released. In 2005, the essays of L'autobus di Stalin were released.

In June 2006, the collection of short stories Shaw 150. Stories of factory and its surroundings was released. Pennacchi collaborated and started a collaboration with Limes. His writings have also appeared in Nuovi Argomenti, MicroMega and Nouvelle Revue Française. Starting in 2007, the author was engaged in a project, together with the Anonymity Writers, which involved the writing of the novel Cronache da un pianeta abbandonato, through the participation and collaboration of unknown authors. Also in 2007, he joined the Democratic Party. In 2008 the essay Fascio e martello was released, in which he described the founding cities of fascism throughout Italy and wrote the subject of the short film Occhi verdi for director Clemente Pernarella.

On 2 March 2010, Canale Mussolini, a novel on the reclamation of the Agro Pontino, was released. The book, defined by the author as "the work for which I came into the world", won the 64th edition of the Strega Prize on 2 July of the same year, the Acqui Award of History as "historical novel of the year", the Book of the Year award, and was a finalist at the Premio Campiello. The novel was acclaimed by a large part of critics and climbed to the top of the sales charts. On 14 November of the same year, he received the Asti d'Appello award in Asti.

On 3 August 2021, Pennacchi died of a heart attack at his home in Latina. Just moments before his death, he was talking on the phone with his wife when he suddenly collapsed. His wife alerted an ambulance for medical aid. After arriving at home, the ambulance rescuers found Pennacchi dead. He was aged 71.

== Works ==
- Mammut, Roma, Donzelli, 1994. ISBN 88-7989-086-7.
- Il fasciocomunista. Vita scriteriata di Accio Benassi., Milano, Mondadori, 2003. ISBN 88-04-48822-0.
- L'autobus di Stalin e altri scritti, Firenze, Vallecchi, 2005. ISBN 88-8427-116-9.
- Shaw 150. Storie di fabbrica e dintorni, Milano, Oscar Mondadori, 2006. ISBN 88-04-55812-1.
- Fascio e martello. Viaggio per le città del duce, Roma-Bari, Laterza, 2008. ISBN 978-88-420-8720-5.
- Canale Mussolini, Milano, Mondadori, 2010. ISBN 978-88-04-54675-7.
