= Walter Russell Mead =

American academic (born 1952)

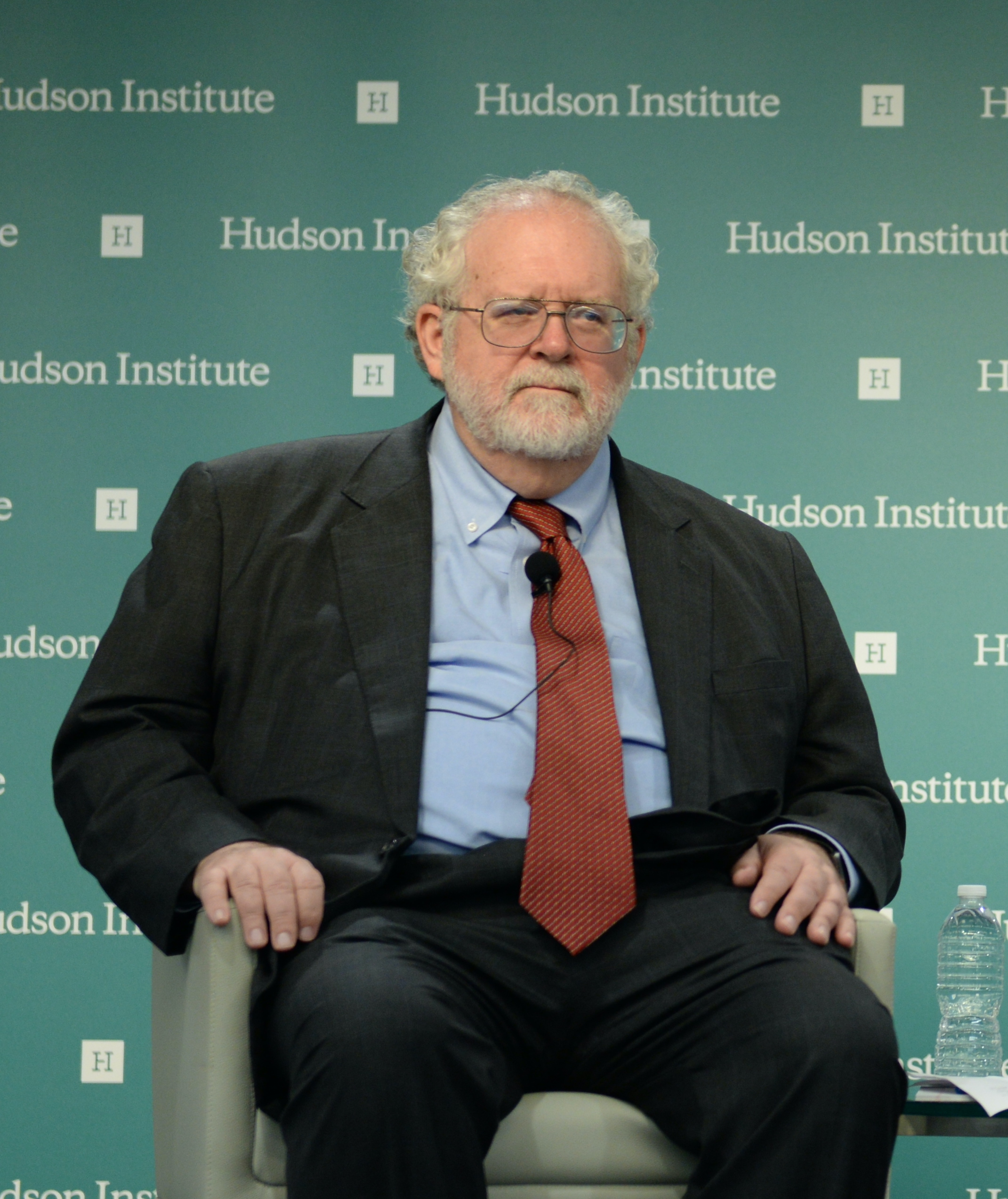
- Mead at a 2019 Hudson Institute event
- Born: June 12, 1952 (age 74); Columbia, South Carolina, U.S.
- Education: Yale University (BA)
- Occupation: Academic

Walter Russell Mead (born June 12, 1952) is an American academic. He is the Alexander Hamilton Professor of Strategy and Statecraft at the University of Florida's Hamilton Center, and taught American foreign policy at Yale University. He was also the editor-at-large of The American Interest magazine. Mead is a columnist for The Wall Street Journal, a scholar at the Hudson Institute, and a book reviewer for Foreign Affairs, the bimonthly foreign policy journal published by the Council on Foreign Relations.

== Early life and education ==
Mead was born on June 12, 1952, in Columbia, South Carolina. His father, Loren Mead, was an Episcopal priest and scholar who grew up in South Carolina. His mother is the former Polly Ayres Mellette. Mead is one of four children with two brothers and one sister. Mead was educated at the Groton School, a private boarding school in Groton, Massachusetts. He then graduated from Yale University, where he earned a Bachelor of Arts degree in English literature.

== Career ==
Mead is the Alexander Hamilton Professor of Strategy and Statecraft at the University of Florida's Hamilton Center, and previously taught American foreign policy at Bard College and Yale University. He was also the editor-at-large of The American Interest. In 2014, he joined the Hudson Institute as a Distinguished Scholar in American Strategy and Statesmanship. He served as the Henry A. Kissinger Senior Fellow for U.S. Foreign Policy at the Council on Foreign Relations until 2010, and is a Global View Columnist for The Wall Street Journal. He is a cofounder of the New America Foundation, a thinktank that has been described as "radical centrist" in orientation.

An active faculty member at Bard's campus in Annandale and its New York-based Globalization and International Affairs Program, he taught on American foreign policy and Anglo-American grand strategy, including curriculum addressing Sun Tzu and Clausewitz. He has conducted coursework on the role of public intellectuals in the internet age, as well as the role of religion in diplomacy. Mead is also a regular instructor for the U.S. State Department's Study of the U.S. Institutes (SUSIs) for Scholars and Secondary Educators. His past teaching positions have included Brady-Johnson Distinguished Fellow in Grand Strategy, at Yale University, from 2008 to 2011, as well as Presidents Fellow at the World Policy Institute at The New School, from 1987 to 1997.

== Books ==
=== The Arc of a Covenant ===
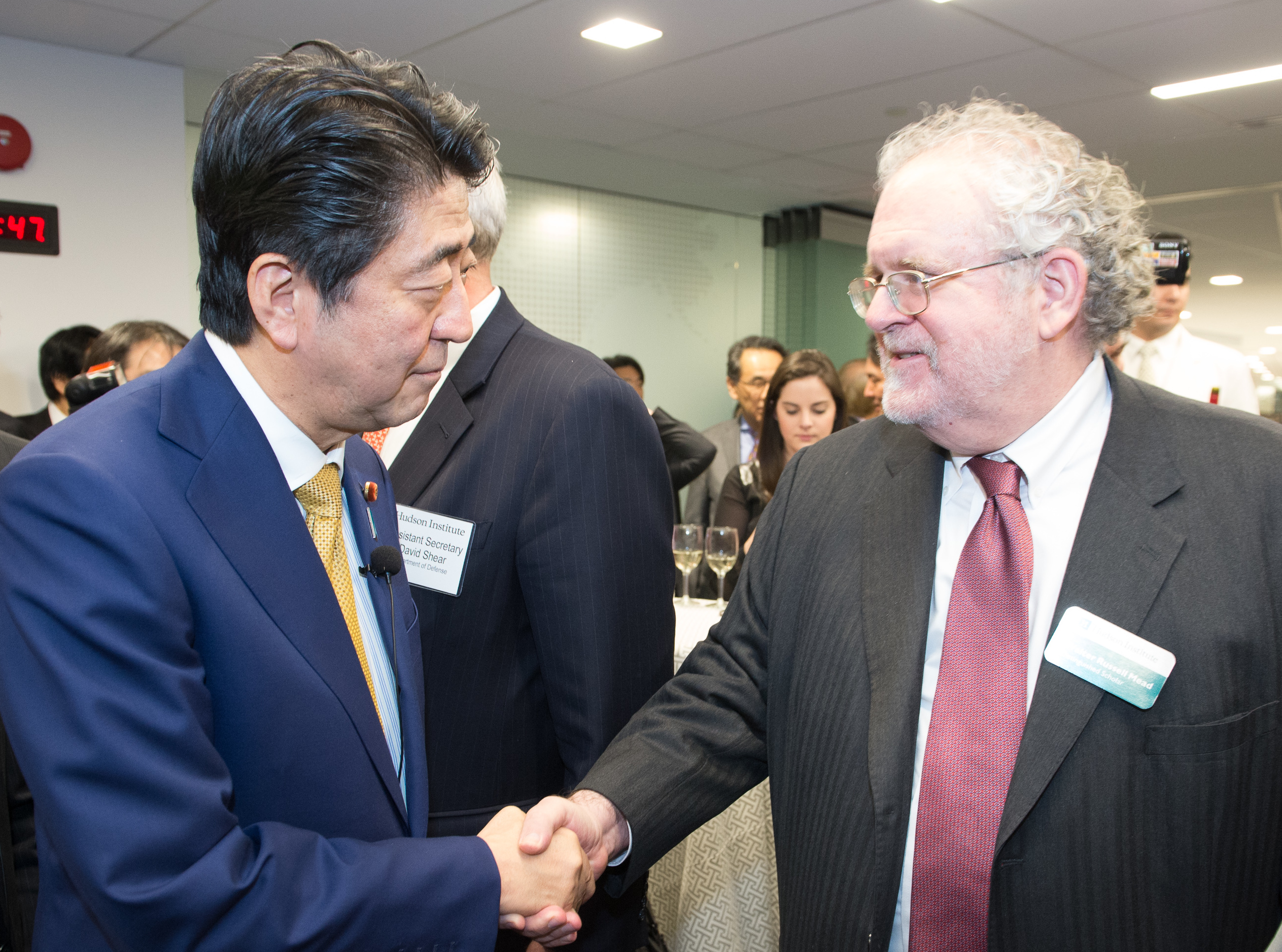
Mead with Shinzō Abe, Prime Minister of Japan, 2016

His most recent book, The Arc of a Covenant: The United States, Israel, and the Fate of the Jewish People was published by Knopf in 2022. With this book, Mead seeks to overturn much of the conventional wisdom about the U.S.-Israel relationship, arguing that both pro-Zionists and anti-Zionists often attribute U.S. policy towards Israel as the work of a monolithic US Jewish community which wields outsized influence and pushes for policy in Israel's interest. Mead presents a case against this view and takes the readers on a survey of the history of Zionism and US-Israel relations, arguing that throughout history, Gentile support for a Jewish state as well as geopolitical realities have influenced US policy towards Israel as much as anything else.

=== God and Gold ===
In October 2007, he published God and Gold: Britain, America, and the Making of the Modern World about the Anglo-American tradition of world power since the 17th century. It argues that the individualism inherent in British and American religion was instrumental for their rise to global power and integrates Francis Fukuyama's "end of history" with Samuel Huntington's "clash of civilizations" in its predictions for the future. The Economist, The Financial Times and The Washington Post all listed God and Gold as one of the best non-fiction books of the year.

=== Power, Terror, Peace and War ===
In June 2005, Mead published Power, Terror, Peace and War: America's Grand Strategy in a World at Risk. The book outlines American foreign policy under the Bush administration after September 11, 2001, and contextualizes it in the history of U.S. foreign policy. In it, Mead recommends changes in the American approach to terrorism, the Israel-Palestine conflict, and international institutions. The New York Times Book Review called him one of the "country's liveliest thinkers about America's role in the world." The book attempts to elaborate on Joseph Nye's "soft power" concept, adding the ideas of "sharp" power, "sticky" power, and "sweet" power, which together work towards "hegemonic power" and "harmonic convergence."

=== Special Providence ===
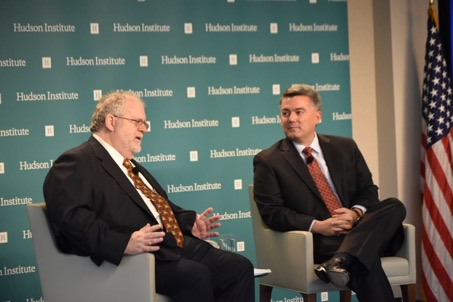
Walter Russell Mead discussing foreign policy challenges with Senator Cory Gardner in October 2017

In 2001, Mead published Special Providence: American Foreign Policy and How it Changed the World. It won the Lionel Gelber Award for the best book in English on International Relations in 2002. The Italian translation won the Premio Acqui Storia, an annual award for the most important historical book published. Special Providence, which stemmed from an article originally published in the Winter 1999/2000 issue of The National Interest, "The Jacksonian Tradition," describes the four main guiding philosophies that have influenced the formation of American foreign policy in history: the Hamiltonians, the Wilsonians, the Jeffersonians, and the Jacksonians.

The Hamiltonian school holds that economic prosperity is necessary for America as a nation and is beneficial for global peace. Historically, Hamiltonians sought to preserve a good relationship with Great Britain, largely for commercial reasons. Since the Second World War, their focus has shifted toward promoting international free trade. The Wilsonian school sees moral significance in American engagement with the world. With a missionary or idealist mindset, Wilsonians promote democracy and peace around the world. The Jeffersonian school is concerned primarily with the preservation of American democracy and civil liberties at home, restricting American engagement abroad to narrowly advance national interests when needed.

The Jacksonian school is similarly isolationist compared to Hamiltonians and Wilsonians, but is more populist than Jeffersonians. Jacksonianism arises particularly from American folk culture, and is consequently suspicious of elites and eager to fight in defense of what Jacksonians see as uniquely American values and culture. According to Mead, the ability of each of these schools to form coalitions at various points in history has allowed American foreign policy to adapt and succeed. He warns that neglect of Jacksonians on the part of political elites in the wake of the Cold War could diminish the effectiveness of American foreign policy in the near future.

The New Left Review described the book as a "robust celebration of Jacksonianism as it historically was... an admiring portrait of a tough, xenophobic folk community, ruthless to outsiders or deserters, rigid in its codes of honour and violence." Not all critics praised the book, however. "Despite the hype surrounding the book, it ultimately challenges little," the geographer Joseph Nevins wrote. "To the contrary, it reinforces the tired notion of U.S. exceptionalism. Thus, he [Mead] paints U.S. deployment of violence as inherently less brutal than that of Washington's enemies. In doing so, he sometimes grossly understates the human devastation wrought by the United States."

==== Jacksonianism and Trump administration ====
Of the four traditions of American politics described in Special Providence, Jacksonianism has received the most attention. Mead has expanded and applied his description of Jacksonianism in his other writings. He describes Jacksonianism as largely uninterested in foreign affairs, deeply suspicious of elites and cosmopolitanism, and deeply patriotic, subscribing whole-heartedly to American Exceptionalism. Despite their general disinterest in foreign policy or the international order, Jacksonians support aggressive military action when the United States is threatened. Gun control and immigration are the issues most important to Jacksonians; they oppose gun control out of desire to defend themselves and their family, and consider the Second Amendment an important failsafe against tyranny. Jacksonians are responsive to debates over immigration and favor policies that restrict it because they view open-border policies as attempts by elites to dilute or depose their way of life.

The idea of a Jacksonian tradition in American politics has received greater interest and attention since the candidacy and election of Donald Trump, particularly because of both former White House Chief Strategist Steve Bannon's references to Jackson and comparisons of Jackson to Trump. The New York Times has speculated that Bannon drew inspiration from Mead's description of Jacksonianism in Special Providence.

In an interview with Politico, Mead was dubbed the "Trump Whisperer" by the author Susan Glasser.

=== Mortal Splendor ===
Mead's first book, Mortal Splendor: The American Empire in Transition, was published in 1987. Mead highlights what he sees as the failures of American neoimperialism in the Cold War and argues that American policy under Nixon and Carter had stifled sustainable development in the Third World. In the concluding chapters, Mead seeks to lay out the foundations of a new global commonwealth in which America acts as steward and helps ensure that Third World nations are able to address their development issues. Reviewing the book in Foreign Affairs, John C. Campbell called Mortal Splendor "a brilliantly written demolition of both liberal and especially conservative shibboleths concerning the political economy of the United States, both in its domestic and international arrangements."

== Political positions ==
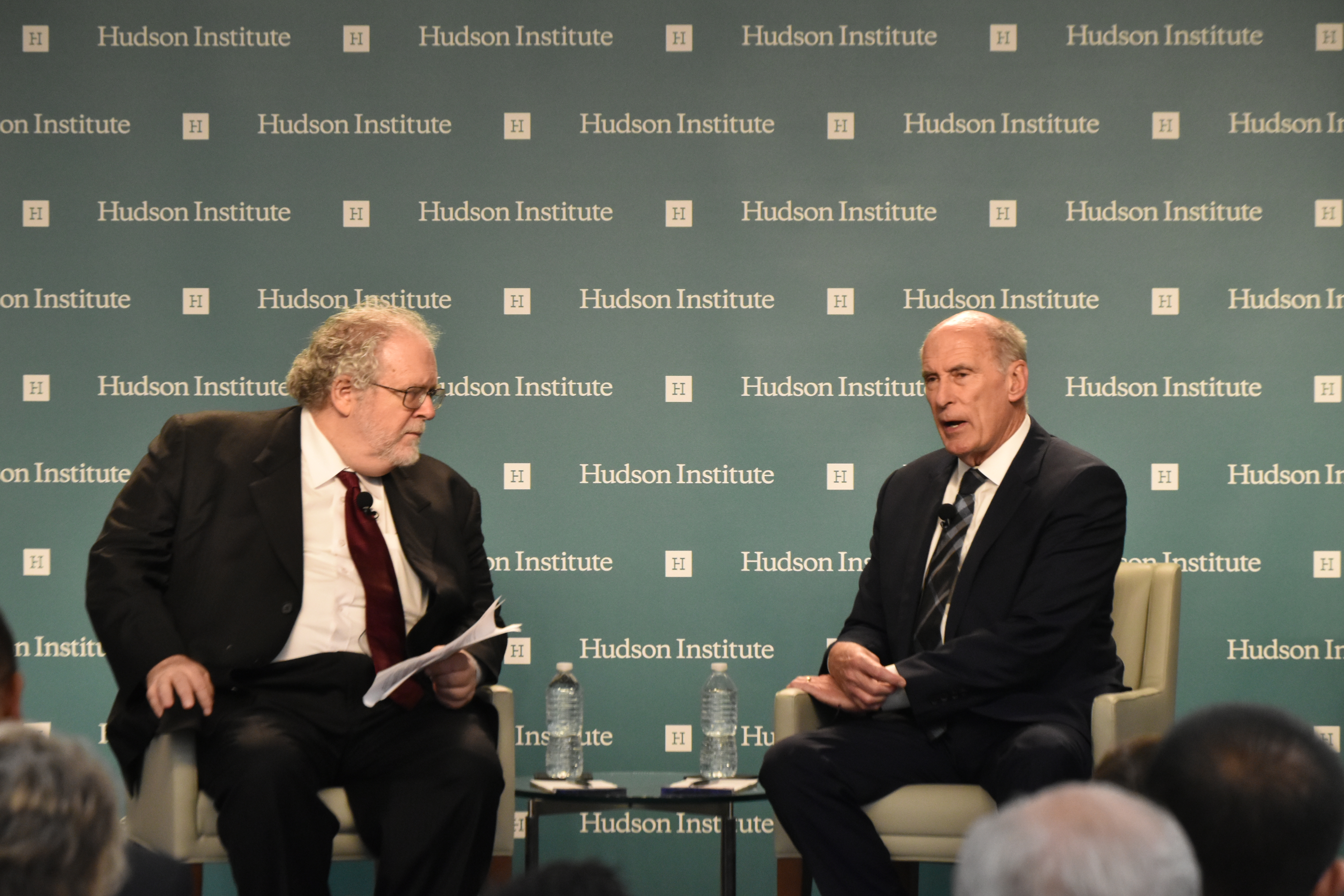
Dan Coats and Walter Russell Mead at the Hudson Institute, 2018

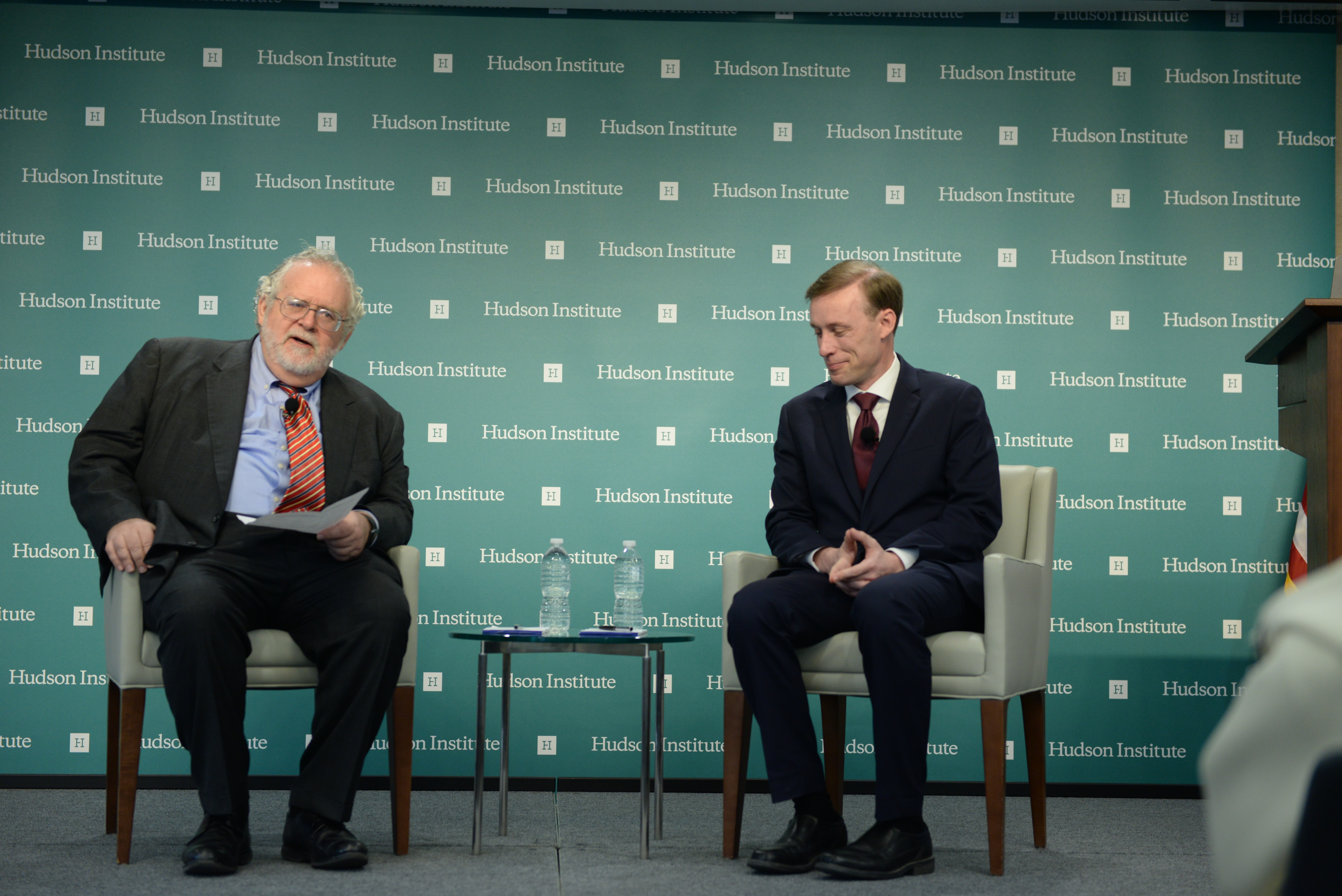
Mead in conversation with Jake Sullivan in March 2019

Mead is a Global View Columnist for Wall Street Journal, and a regular and influential contributor to Foreign Affairs.

In the early 1990s, Mead advocated for a "grand bargain" with the Russian Federation, suggesting that the "United States buy about 3.5 million square miles of Eastern Siberia and the Russian Far East and pay Russia $3 trillion -- half of which would be used to purchase goods produced in the United States". Although the proposal was made "tongue in cheek", Mead maintained that the United States should give "Russia the money it needs in exchange for some tangible quid pro quo", offering "the highest possible price for the largest possible concession".

From 2009 until August 2017, Mead oversaw a popular daily blog, "Via Meadia", on the website of the journal American Interest. Via media is a Latin phrase meaning "the middle road" and is a philosophical maxim for life which advocates moderation in all thoughts and actions. In frequent posts throughout the day, he and Via Meadia's staff wrote about two primary areas: America's foreign policy and how well it is working in various situations throughout the world and America's domestic state of affairs, particularly the decline of what he terms the Blue Social Model of governing following World War II. Via Meadia was read regularly by U.S. congressmen, foreign dignitaries, and high-level government officials in the State Department and the White House.

=== The Return of Geopolitics ===
Mead published an influential piece in the 2014 May/June issue of Foreign Affairs titled "The Return of Geopolitics." Writing in the wake of Russia's annexation of Crimea, ongoing turmoil in the Middle East, and rising tensions in East Asia, Mead argued that much of the foreign policy consensus among Western elites since the end of the Cold War had been naïve in assuming that traditional questions of geopolitics would no longer dictate international affairs. Mistaking the fall of the USSR as the ultimate triumph of liberal democracy and capitalism over alternative systems of government, Mead argued that the US and EU subsequently turned their attention to transnational issues of trade liberalization, climate change, and human rights while foolishly neglecting the dynamics of great-power politics. "China, Iran, and Russia never bought into the geopolitical settlement that followed the Cold War," Mead warned, "and they are making increasingly forceful attempts to overturn it. That process will not be peaceful, and whether or not the revisionists succeed, their efforts have already shaken the balance of power and changed the dynamics of international politics." In many of his Via Meadia blog posts for American Interest, Mead alluded to Game of Thrones to describe power dynamics among Asian countries.

=== Positions on interventions in recent conflicts ===
In 2003, he argued that an Iraq War was preferable to continuing UN sanctions against Iraq, because "Each year of containment is a new Gulf War", and that "The existence of al Qaeda, and the attacks of Sept. 11, 2001, are part of the price the United States has paid to contain Saddam Hussein." He has since become more critical of the war, and advocated for the Republican Party to change its official policy on it.

Mead was critical of the Obama administration's failure to contain the fallout from the "reckless and thoughtless" 2011 NATO intervention in Libya. Noting that while the administration had trumpeted the intervention as a humanitarian one, "NATO didn't so much prevent massacres as move them offstage" to places like neighboring Mali where Tuareg mercenaries formerly on Qaddafi’s payroll returned home following the intervention in order to begin their own insurgency.

Mead was also critical of President Barack Obama's decision not to launch a military strike against Syria in retaliation for Syrian President Bashar al-Assad's use of chemical weapons against civilians. He argued that Obama made an "empty statement" by condemning the attacks without accompanying military force, had damaged American credibility, and encouraged Russia and Iran to ramp up their direct support for al-Assad's regime. Mead supported arming certain elements in the Syrian resistance as a stop-gap measure, but was realistic about the character of most rebel groups as well as the prospects for a post-conflict Syria. Mead suggested that supporting Syrian rebels who may be unsavory but are not openly antagonistic to the US could shorten the conflict, weaken Iran's influence in the region, increase the relative power of non-jihadist rebels post-conflict, and decrease the likelihood of a more robust American intervention being required in the future.

=== Decline of the "Blue Social Model" ===
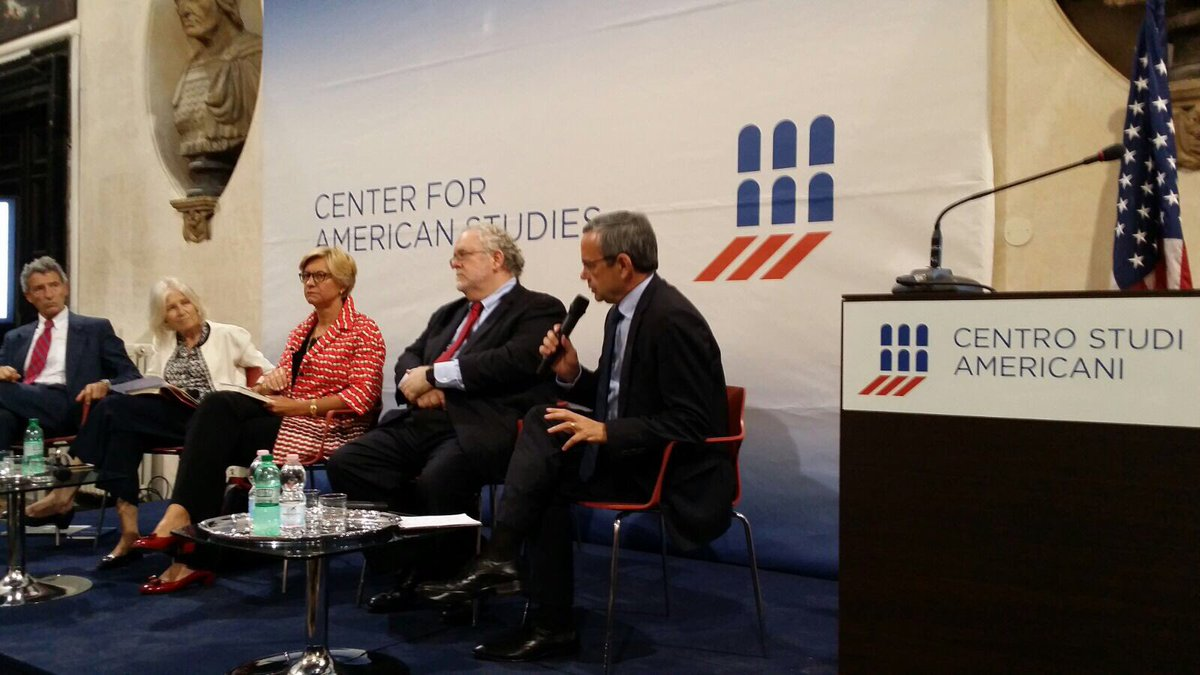
Mead speaking with co-panelists in Rome at an event hosted by the Italian Minister of Defense, 2017

Mead has written extensively about the decline of the "Blue Social Model," which refers to the political and economic status quo of the United States following the New Deal and the Second World War. Under this Model, a small group of American corporations such as AT&T and the Big Three auto manufacturers faced little competition, either domestically or internationally. These corporations felt little pressure to change, while regulation by the federal government kept their prices down. Jobs were stable and a high school diploma sufficed for a stable career and income. Labor unions were large and membership affordable. The Blue Social Model was able to sustain a faith that American quality of life would steadily improve and that no major disruptions in the domestic or global order would come. Mead sees the transition from an industrial economy to an information economy since 1970 as a fundamental challenge to the Blue Model, causing greater global competition due to automation and low-wage labor in developing nations. Government, meanwhile, has had greater difficulty departing from the Blue Model due to the size of the federal bureaucracy and of benefits that originated under the Model, such as Social Security.

=== Dispute with Walt and Mearsheimer ===
Mead has been a strong critic of the "Israel Lobby" hypothesis advanced by political scientists Stephen Walt and John Mearsheimer. In a review of their book The Israel Lobby and U.S. Foreign Policy in Foreign Affairs, Mead raised concerns about Walt and Mearsheimer's methodology and conclusions, as well as their theoretical consistency, pointing out that the structural realist view of international relations that Walt and Mearsheimer advance elsewhere insists that domestic factors are generally irrelevant to foreign policy, while the "Israel Lobby" hypothesis strongly insists on the opposite. Mead also notes that, contrary to Walt and Mearsheimer's claim that pro-Israel groups exert influence through campaign finance, pro-Israel groups contributed less than one percent of PAC contributions in the 2006 election cycle. Mead agreed that pro-Israel political advocacy is a topic worthy of study, but argued that the United States' policy on Israel grows out of more diverse and complicated historical reasons than described in The Israel Lobby.

=== Transatlantic relations ===
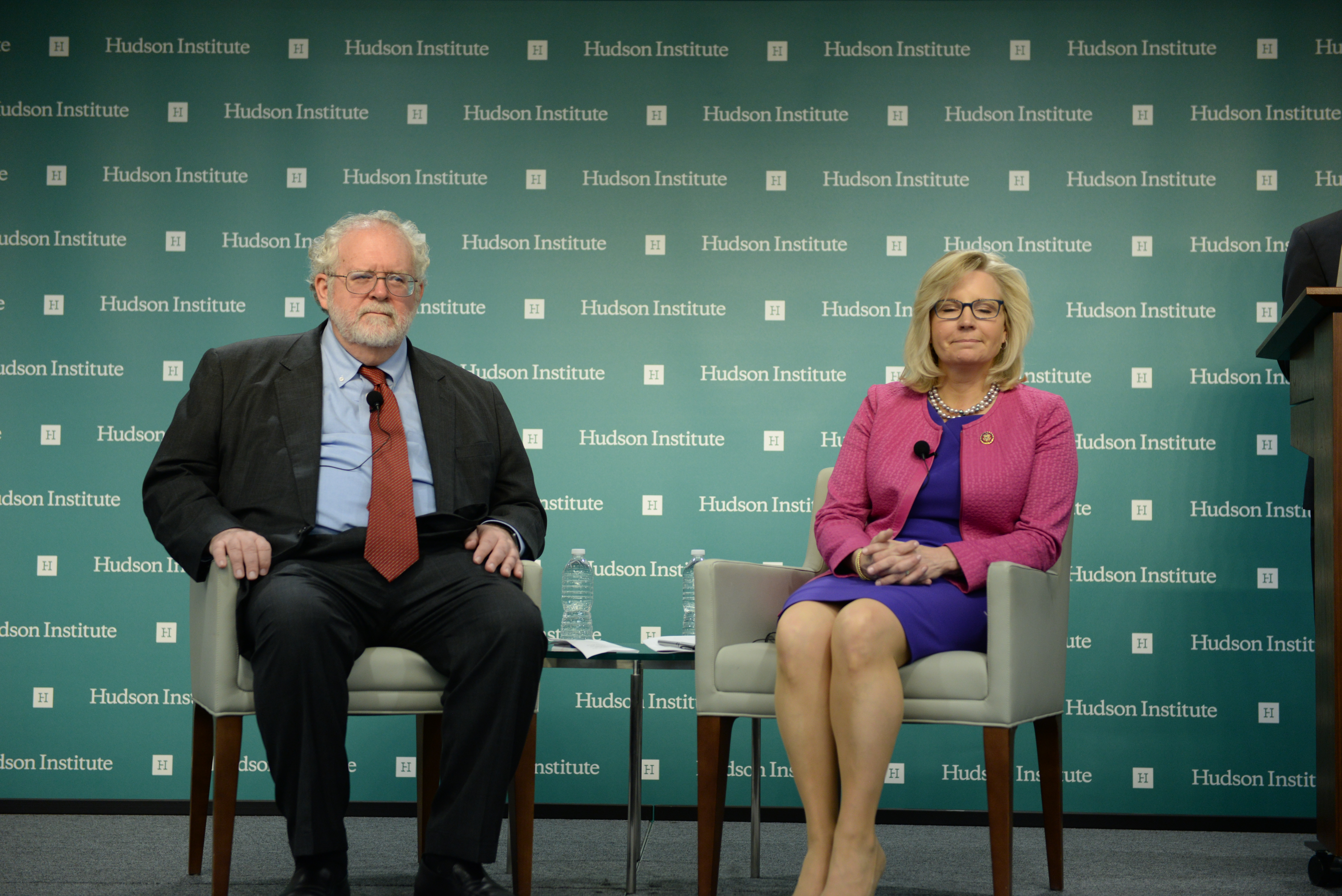
Mead and Liz Cheney at a Hudson Institute event, 2019

Mead has been a strong supporter of Transatlantic relations. As one of America's leading analysts of international affairs, Mead has had a belief that global prosperity, the defense of human rights, and the establishment of a secure and peaceful order in Transatlantic relations require a foreign policy that places a robust America at the center of a vigorous network of allies. In his article "What Truman Can Teach Trump" for The Wall Street Journal, Mead compares a foreign policy of Truman and Trump and states that "The U.S. needed to take on the global role that the British Empire had played at its zenith" and "A Trumanist approach would start by showing some trust in the foreign policy instincts of the American People." Mead is currently a Richard von Weizsäcker Fellow at the Bosch Stiftung.

=== "China Is the Real Sick Man of Asia" controversy ===
In February 2020, Mead published an opinion piece in The Wall Street Journal titled "China Is the Real Sick Man of Asia". The title, chosen by the Journal's editors, was criticized by a Chinese foreign spokesperson and some professors in the United States as racist; the article was defended by the CEO of Dow Jones, the company that publishes the Journal. 53 reporters and editors of the Wall Street Journal signed an open letter criticizing the headline and urging the newspaper's leaders "to consider correcting the headline and apologizing to our readers, sources, colleagues and anyone else who was offended" by it. Arguing against such an apology was former U.S. diplomat Susan L. Shirk who, according to an article in The New York Times, argued that the newspaper should refrain from making an apology because the Chinese government had demanded one. In March 2020, the Chinese government expelled three Wall Street Journal reporters from China over the article, the first such expulsion since 1998. This decision drew criticism from the State Department, the Foreign Correspondents' Club of China, and an article in USA Today.

== Personal life ==
Mead lives in Washington, D.C. He is a member of the Church of the Advent, an Anglican church in Washington.
