= Stefano Paleari =

Italian academic and public official

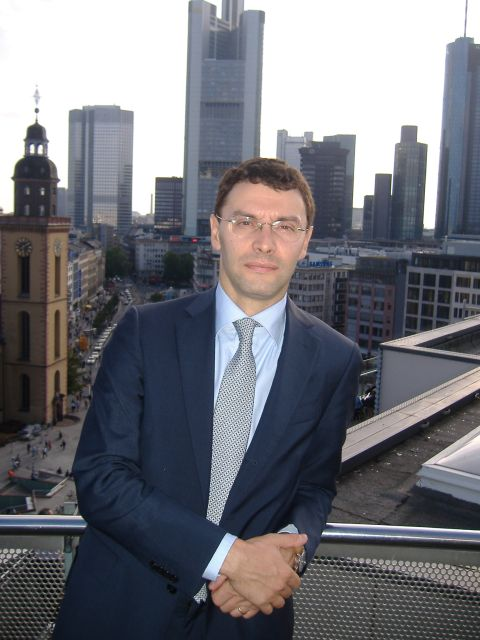
- Born: January 24, 1965 (age 61); Milan, Italy
- Occupations: Academic, public official
- Known for: Financial systems analysis; university governance; Alitalia extraordinary commissioner
- Awards: Grande Ufficiale dell’Ordine al Merito della Repubblica Italiana (2015); Cavaliere di Gran Croce dell’Ordine al Merito della Repubblica Italiana (2021)

Academic background
- Education: Politecnico di Milano

Academic work
- Discipline: Financial systems analysis
- Institutions: University of Bergamo

Stefano Paleari (born 24 January 1965) is an Italian academic specializing in financial systems analysis and public management. A professor at the University of Bergamo, he served as its Rector from 2009 to 2015. He later became one of the government-appointed commissioners of Alitalia and has held positions in national and European university bodies. He has received honours from the Italian Republic.

== Early life and education ==
Stefano was born in Milan on 24 January 1965. He graduated cum laude in Nuclear Engineering from the Politecnico di Milano in 1990.

== Academic career ==
Paleari has been a professor of financial systems analysis at the University of Bergamo. He became a researcher in management engineering at the University of Bergamo in 1996, and an associate professor in Economics and Business Organization at the Politecnico di Milano in 1998. He has been a full professor of financial systems analysis at the University of Bergamo since 2001.

From 2009 to 2015, he served as Rector of the University of Bergamo. He was a member of the Conference of Italian University Rectors (CRUI) executive board and served as CRUI Secretary General from 2011 to 2013. He was elected President of CRUI in 2013, serving until 2015. He also served on the board of the European University Association from 2013 to 2017.

Since 2006, he has been Scientific Director of ICCSAI, the International Center for Competitiveness Studies in the Aviation Industry. He was external examiner for the MSc in Air Transport Management at Cranfield University, and visiting scholar at the Max Planck Institute for the History of Science in 2016.

In 2016, he received an honorary doctorate in economics from the Mediterranea University of Reggio Calabria.

== Public service ==
In 2017, the Italian government appointed Paleari as one of the three extraordinary commissioners of Alitalia, together with Luigi Gubitosi and Enrico Laghi. He was indicated by the Ministry of Transport as an expert in air transport. He previously carried out a preliminary study on the possible integration of the airport companies of Malpensa, Linate and Bergamo, namely SEA (Società Esercizi Aeroportuali) and SACBO (Società per l’Aeroporto Civile di Bergamo Orio al Serio), in 2015.

He has served as president of the Coordination Committee of Human Technopole since 2016. He has been a member of the Steering Committee of the Istituto Toniolo since January 2016, and a member of the Coordinating Council for Higher Education of Portugal since July 2016.

On 2 June 2015, he was awarded the title of Grande Ufficiale dell’Ordine al Merito della Repubblica Italiana. On 15 June 2021, he received the title of Cavaliere di Gran Croce dell’Ordine al Merito della Repubblica Italiana.

Since 2022, he has served as president of the ANTHEM Foundation (AdvaNced Technologies for Human centrEd Medicine), an institution dedicated to promoting research and innovation in advanced technologies applied to healthcare.

== Selected articles ==
=== Financial economics ===
- Audretsch, D. B., Lehmann, E. E., Paleari, S., & Vismara, S. (2016). Entrepreneurial finance and technology transfer. The Journal of Technology Transfer, 41(1), 1–9.
- Vismara, S., Paleari, S., & Ritter, J. R. (2012). Europe's second markets for small companies. European Financial Management, 18(3), 352–388.

=== Air transportation ===
- Malighetti, P., Paleari, S., & Redondi, R. (2009). Pricing strategies of low-cost airlines: The Ryanair case study. Journal of Air Transport Management, 15(4), 195–203.
- Malighetti, P., Paleari, S., & Redondi, R. (2008). Connectivity of the European airport network:“Self-help hubbing” and business implications. Journal of Air Transport Management, 14(2), 53–65.

=== Higher education ===
- Seeber, M., Cattaneo, M., Huisman, J., & Paleari, S. (2016). Why do higher education institutions internationalize? An investigation of the multilevel determinants of internationalization rationales. Higher education, 72(5), 685–702.
- Donina, D., Meoli, M., & Paleari, S. (2015). Higher education reform in Italy: Tightening regulation instead of steering at a distance. Higher Education Policy, 28(2), 215–234.
