= Il Fatto Quotidiano =

Italian daily newspaper

il Fatto Quotidiano
- Non riceve alcun finanziamento pubblico ("It does not receive any public funding")

- Front page of the first issue of the newspaper on 23 September 2009
- Type: Daily newspaper
- Format: Compact
- Owner: Editoriale Il Fatto S.p.A.
- Editor: Marco Travaglio
- Founded: 23 September 2009
- Political alignment: Left-wing populism Anti-establishment
- Language: Italian
- Headquarters: Rome, Italy
- Circulation: 53,242 (September 2022)
- ISSN: 2037-089X
- Website: ilfattoquotidiano.it

il Fatto Quotidiano (English: "The Daily Fact") is an Italian daily newspaper founded in 2009 by journalists Marco Travaglio, Peter Gomez, Marco Lillo, Furio Colombo, Bruno Tinti, Cinzia Monteverdi and Antonio Padellaro. Padellaro served as editor-in-chief from the paper's founding until 3 February 2015, when he was succeeded by Marco Travaglio, previously deputy editor and co-editor. As of 2022 it has an average combined print and digital circulation of about 50,000 copies and an average readership of approximately 475,000.

== History ==
=== Origins and founding ===
In May 2008, journalist Marco Travaglio announced the creation of a new newspaper on his blog voglioscendere.it. From 28 June 2009, the website l'AnteFatto went live, keeping readers updated on the newspaper's development during a lengthy preparatory phase; according to the paper's first issue, the site reached roughly 3.5 million contacts within about three months, and an initial subscription campaign attracted around 30,000 readers.

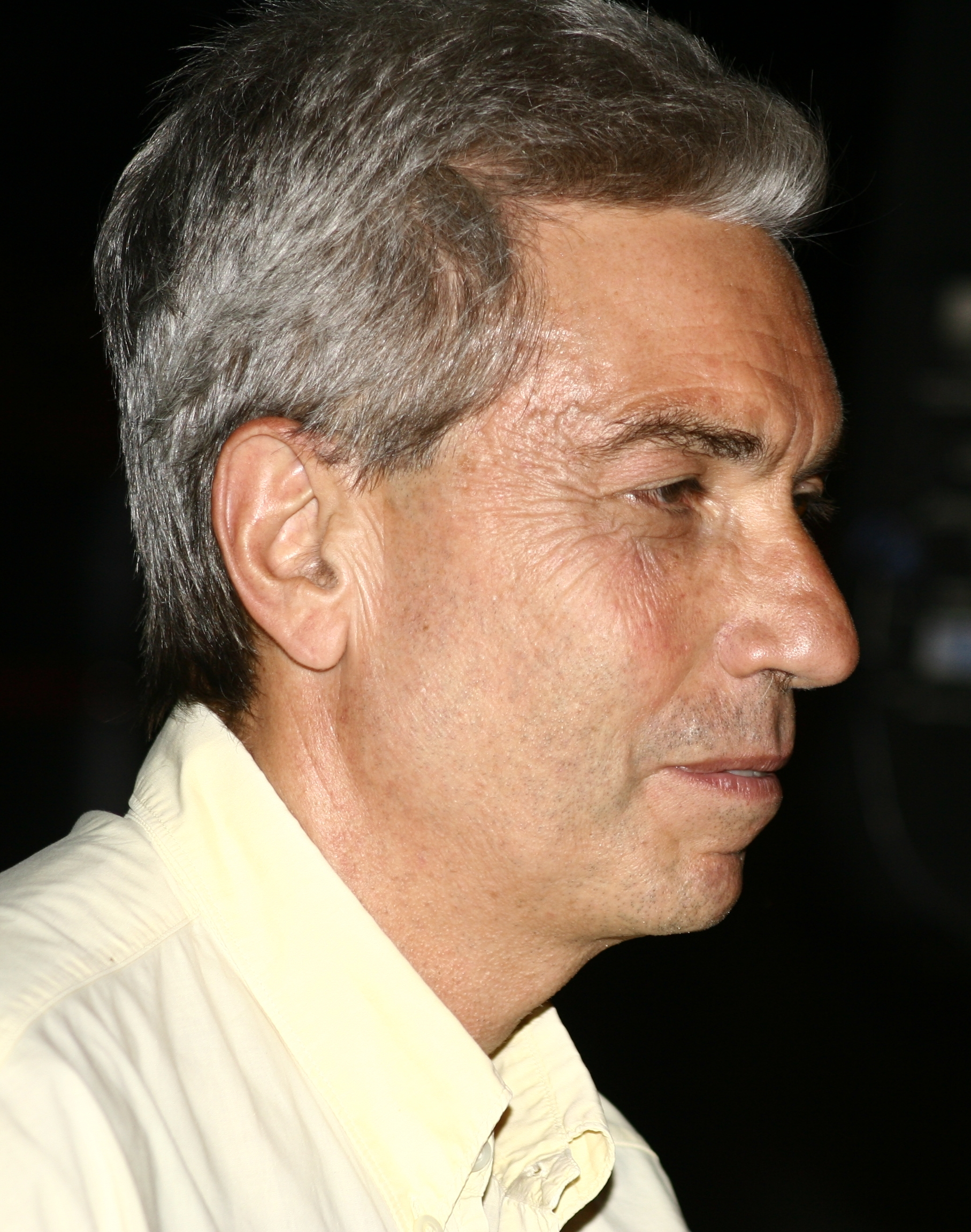
Antonio Padellaro, founder and editor until 2015

The newspaper was first printed on Wednesday, 23 September 2009, under the title Il Fatto Quotidiano. The name was chosen in memory of journalist Enzo Biagi, host of the television programme Il Fatto, while the paper's logo — depicting a newsboy — was inspired by the newspaper La Voce, as a tribute to its founder Indro Montanelli. According to the paper's editors, by 8 a.m. copies had nearly sold out at newsstands nationwide, prompting a reprint in the following days as well as the release of a digital version of the issue.

In the paper's first editorial, titled "Linea politica, la Costituzione" ("Political line, the Constitution"), founding editor Antonio Padellaro laid out the newspaper's editorial stance: "They ask us: what will your political line be? We answer: the Constitution of the Republic." In the same editorial, Padellaro positioned the paper in opposition, stating: "To Berlusconi, certainly, because he has reduced a great democracy to a degrading sultanate. But we will make no allowances for the leaders of the Democratic Party and the fractured left, who in all these years have failed to build any real alternative."

From its earliest days, publisher Editoriale Il Fatto S.p.A. stated its intention not to make use of public press subsidies, relying instead solely on advertising and sales revenue. To underline this, from the issue of Thursday 21 January 2010 the paper's masthead carried the phrase "Non riceve alcun finanziamento pubblico" ("Receives no public funding"). The paper did, however, continue to benefit from the reduced postal rates available by law to all Italian publishers for paper, digital services and distribution costs, until these were abolished in April 2010.

=== 2010: corporate consolidation ===
A year ago we told ourselves: if in a year we sell fewer than fifteen thousand copies, we'll close anyway. A year later we are selling on average 74,000 copies, plus more than 40,000 subscribers who put their trust in us right away.

— Antonio Padellaro, "Il nostro primo anno", editorial of 23 September 2010

Less than five months after launch, on 1 February 2010 the editorial offices moved from Via Orazio 10 to the larger, more modern premises at Via Valadier 42. Later that month, on 28 February 2010, the paper launched the satirical supplement Il Misfatto, headed initially by Roberto Corradi and, from 24 April 2011, by Stefano Disegni; the supplement ceased publication on 29 September 2013 after more than two years.

In March 2010, Telebavaglio ("Gag TV"), a nine-episode political commentary programme, was streamed live to circumvent the suspension of political talk shows on RAI during the March 2010 regional elections. It was hosted by staff journalists Stefano Feltri and Carlo Tecce and Silvia Truzzi, with cartoonists Mario Natangelo, Michele De Pirro and Luca Bertolotti.

On 22 June 2010 the newspaper's website was launched in beta, headed by Peter Gomez. Traffic was so heavy in the hours following launch that access had to be temporarily suspended on several occasions in the following days. On 25 September 2010, ilfattoquotidiano.it won the 2010 "Oscar" for Best Online News Outlet, awarded by the magazine Macchianera on the basis of a public online vote. The online edition's newsroom is based in Milan, at Viale Francesco Restelli 5, opposite the headquarters of the Lombardy Regional Government.

A new nine-episode run of Telebavaglio aired in late August 2010, distributed on the website and, on a delayed basis, on the satellite channel Current TV.

Fifteen months after launch, the company reported a profit in both 2009 and 2010; in 2010, revenue and profit totalled €29.6 million and €5.8 million respectively.

=== 2011: the year of Annozero ===
The year opened with the 20 January broadcast of Annozero on Rai Due, a programme closely associated with the newspaper.

A year after the satirical supplement's launch, the paper introduced a cultural supplement. From Friday 25 February 2011, the weekly eight-page insert Saturno, covering literature, science, the arts, multimedia, cinema and philosophy, was edited by Riccardo Chiaberge. It ceased publication on 2 March 2012 following Chiaberge's resignation.

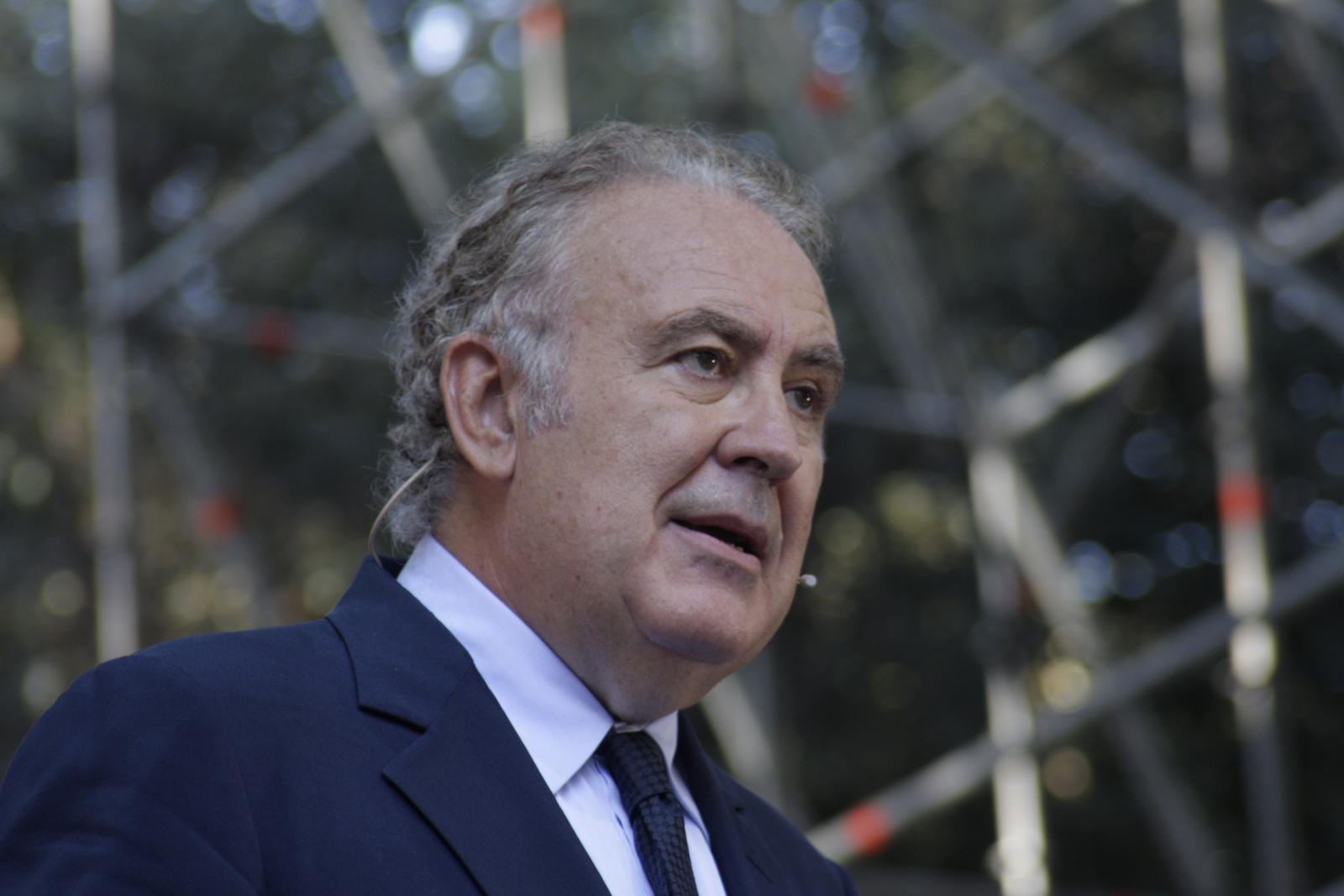
Michele Santoro, host of Servizio pubblico

From late July 2011, the newspaper produced the talk show È la stampa, bellezza! ("That's the press, baby!"), eight episodes streamed live on the paper's website and hosted by web-desk journalist David Perluigi.

On 20 September 2011, publisher Editoriale Il Fatto S.p.A. unanimously approved a €350,000 capital increase in order to become a shareholder in Zerostudio's, the production company through which Michele Santoro produced his programme Servizio pubblico. On 1 October 2011, for the second consecutive year, ilfattoquotidiano.it won the Macchianera Oscar for Best Online News Outlet.

Following the formation of the Monti Cabinet in November 2011, the newspaper maintained a strongly oppositional line throughout its term, setting itself apart from most other Italian outlets, arguing the new parliamentary majority could not realistically enable meaningful reform, and repeatedly criticising the government's perceived ineffectiveness and unreliability.

=== 2012–2014: expansion of the online edition ===
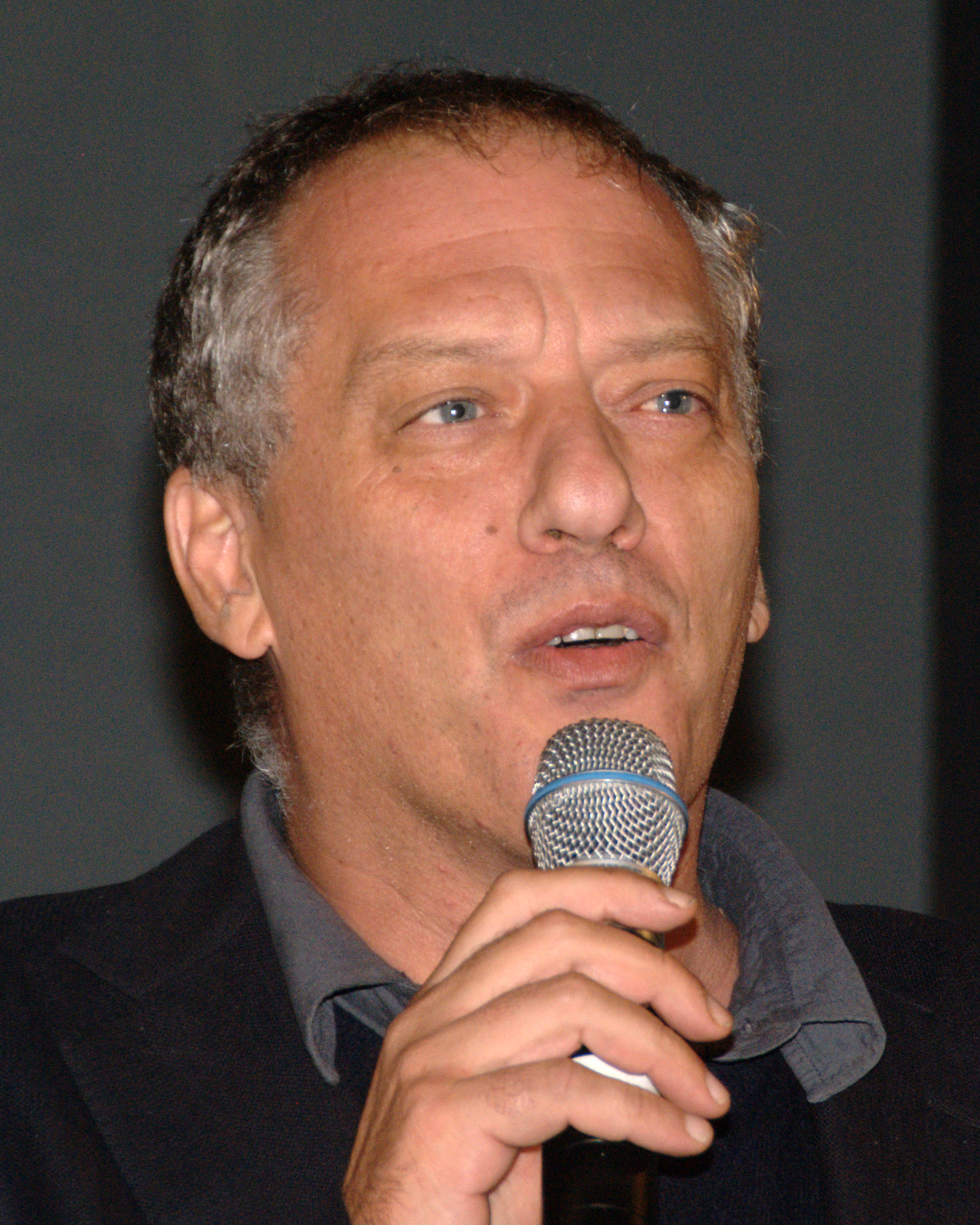
Peter Gomez, editor of ilfattoquotidiano.it

From 15 October 2012, the paper began publishing on Mondays as well. That same year, ilfattoquotidiano.it was named the best political-opinion website at the Macchianera BlogFest awards.

To support the online edition financially, from 3 May 2013 the paper introduced a "supporting user" subscription scheme, a lighter form of subscription letting readers propose and select investigative stories for the website to pursue. Partly as a result, in 2013 ilfattoquotidiano.it was named Best Italian Website of the Year at BlogFest.

From 8 May 2013, the newspaper began distributing a weekly four-page economic supplement, il Fatto economico, overseen by economics editor Stefano Feltri.

Following the start of the XVII Legislature of Italy in March 2013, the paper again positioned itself in opposition, a stance reinforced when deputy editor Marco Travaglio publicly stated he had voted for Antonio Ingroia's Rivoluzione Civile list for the Chamber of Deputies and for the Five Star Movement for the Senate in the 2013 Italian general election.

=== 2015: leadership passes from Padellaro to Travaglio ===
As of today I am leaving the editorship of Il Fatto Quotidiano to Marco Travaglio, but I am not leaving our newspaper, because we are a team and we play as a team.

— Antonio Padellaro, editorial of 4 February 2015

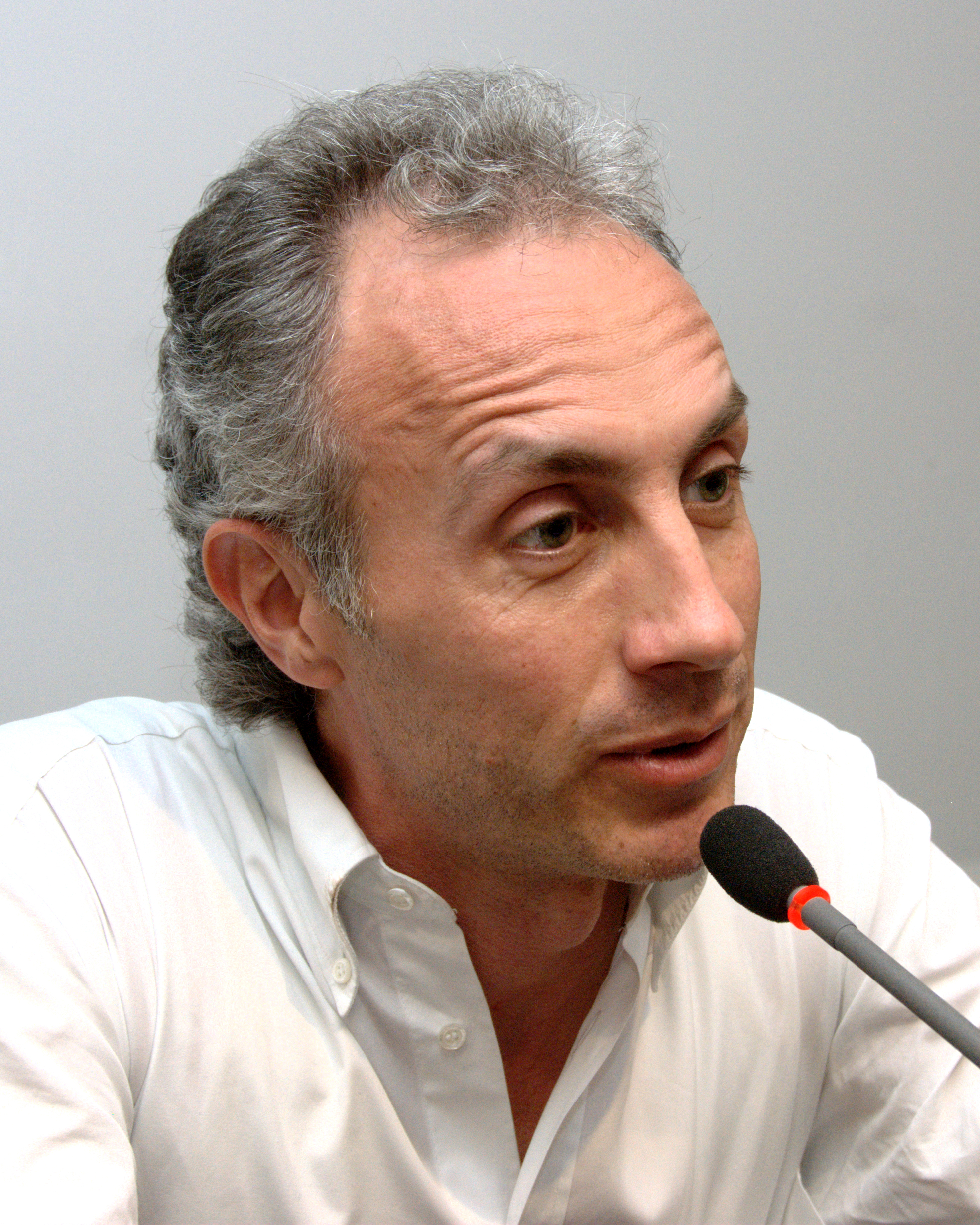
Marco Travaglio, editor of the newspaper since February 2015

2015 began with the bloody Charlie Hebdo shooting. In response, on 14 January 2015 the newspaper was distributed with a reprint of Charlie Hebdo issue No. 1178 attached.

That same day, editor Antonio Padellaro told the weekly magazine Panorama of his intention to leave the paper he had founded. On 3 February 2015, editorship of the newspaper officially passed to former deputy editor Marco Travaglio. Padellaro instead became chairman of the publishing company while continuing to write as a columnist.

Until the day before yesterday, when someone called me "editor", I turned around, thinking Antonio Padellaro was behind me. Starting today I will keep turning around, hoping to find Antonio Padellaro behind me.

— Marco Travaglio, editorial of 5 February 2015

On 5 February, Marco Travaglio published his first editorial as editor, confirming the paper would maintain the editorial line established under Padellaro, oriented toward respect for the Constitution of Italy and critical opposition.

=== 2016: campaigning for "No" in the constitutional referendum ===
In May 2016, television host Michele Santoro, through his majority-owned production company Zerostudio's, acquired a 7% stake in the newspaper. A committee of guarantors was also established, made up of Peter Gomez, Marco Lillo, Antonio Padellaro, Marco Travaglio and Santoro himself.

The newspaper campaigned openly against the 2016 Italian constitutional referendum of 4 December 2016, taking numerous initiatives: changing its Facebook profile picture to read "I vote No", promoting petitions against the reform, giving broad coverage to prominent supporters of the "No" campaign — from Dario Fo to constitutional scholar Gustavo Zagrebelsky — organising conferences on the subject, and inviting readers to share their reasons for voting against the reform. Santoro publicly criticised the paper's unconditional support for "No" in an interview with Il Foglio, hinting he might divest from the newspaper.

=== 2017: the launch of Loft ===
In February 2017 the paper moved offices for the third time in its history, relocating from the Prati district to its current headquarters at Via di Sant'Erasmo 2 in Rome; the web edition's newsroom, headed by Peter Gomez, remained in Milan at Via Francesco Restelli 5.

On 9 May 2017, Michele Santoro told Italia Oggi he would divest his shares in the newspaper, citing "political and cultural differences" with the paper that meant the two no longer collaborated on joint projects, including a planned television venture. He did not sell his shares immediately, remaining a 7% shareholder (through Zerostudio's) until a more favourable arrangement could be found. Chief executive Cinzia Monteverdi noted that a possible solution could involve a cross-compensation of shareholdings. On 20 July 2017, Santoro resigned from the committee of guarantors and sold Zerostudio's shares in the paper, ending all ties to the newspaper.

On 8 August 2017, columnist Bruno Tinti ended his collaboration with the paper to write for La Verità.

On 3 November 2017 the newspaper launched Loft, an online TV platform on which various Fatto journalists host their own news and entertainment programmes.

=== 2018–2020 ===
In May 2018, chief executive Cinzia Monteverdi succeeded Antonio Padellaro as chairman of the company.

On 19 November 2018, reporter Davide Vecchi left Il Fatto Quotidiano to become editor of Corriere dell'Umbria and its associated local editions.

In May 2020, Stefano Feltri left Il Fatto Quotidiano to become editor of Domani, a new newspaper published by Carlo De Benedetti. That same month, journalist Gad Lerner began contributing to the paper after ending his collaboration with la Repubblica.

=== 2021 ===
In 2021, Il Fatto Quotidiano launched the app PlayToday, an original game based on current affairs, politics and news, available on iOS 13.0+ and Android 8.0 Oreo+, built around four weekly games and also offering an in-app newspaper subscription.

On 30 July 2021, the board of directors of Società Editoriale il Fatto S.p.A. ("SEIF") approved the creation of the Fondazione Il Fatto Quotidiano, a foundation with a stated humanitarian purpose of strengthening social engagement, reducing inequality and fostering dialogue with civil society through solidarity-based projects.

=== 2022 ===
On 18 March 2022, Alessandro Orsini, who had recently resigned from Il Messaggero, became a contributor to Il Fatto Quotidiano. The newspaper's stance following the 2022 Russian invasion of Ukraine, seen by some critics as sympathetic to Putin, prompted columnist Furio Colombo to resign, returning to write for la Repubblica.

The paper's circulation declined during this period: in June 2021, average newsstand sales stood at 25,456 copies (51,383 total print and digital), falling to 23,201 copies (48,395 total) by June 2022.

=== 2023–2024 ===
Industry-wide ADS circulation data (combined print and digital) showed declines for nearly all of the top 20 Italian newspapers, with Il Fatto Quotidiano the sole exception, rising 5.57% (from 51,521 to 54,393 copies). The company nonetheless posted a net loss of about €2.38 million for 2023, a marked improvement on the roughly €4.29 million loss recorded in 2022.

=== 2025 ===
On 21 April 2025, Gad Lerner announced he had left the paper a month earlier, citing his objection to Travaglio's editorial line, which he characterised as excessively lenient "in the face of the rise of nationalist and quasi-fascist right-wing movements: from Trump to Putin and at home too."

== FQ Magazine ==
FQ Magazine is a section of Il Fatto Quotidiano devoted to television, music, film and viral news content.

== MillenniuM ==
On 6 May 2017 the newspaper launched MillenniuM, a monthly magazine whose title was inspired by the fictional magazine in Stieg Larsson's Millennium series, available in print and, since May 2019, also as a digital PDF edition. Each issue is devoted to a specific theme.

== Corporate structure ==
The newspaper is published by Società Editoriale Il Fatto (SEIF), a joint-stock company with no controlling shareholder. Its chair and chief executive is Cinzia Monteverdi; the board of directors also includes Luca D'Aprile, Lucia Calvosa and Antonio Padellaro. On 14 March 2019, SEIF debuted on the Borsa Italiana, trading on the AIM Italia segment reserved for small and medium-sized enterprises.

=== Corporate statute ===
The company's statute stipulates that share capital (€2,460,000 as of 14 May 2012) is divided into three classes of shares:

- Category A, for entrepreneur shareholders
- Category B, for staff shareholders (editorial journalists)
- Special shares (not yet issued), reserved for readers and subscribers

The statute prohibits any controlling shareholder, since no single shareholder may hold more than 16.67% of share capital, and Category A (entrepreneur) shareholders together may not hold more than 70% of the total. As a result, key decisions — such as changes to editorial line or the appointment of the editor — require a qualified majority of at least 70% plus one, meaning the consent of journalist (Category B) shareholders cannot be bypassed.

=== Shareholders ===
Shareholders of Il Fatto Quotidiano include journalists Antonio Padellaro, Marco Travaglio, Peter Gomez and Marco Lillo. As of 12 May 2022, share capital of €2,501,000 was divided as follows:

- Antonio Padellaro — 16.25%
- Cinzia Monteverdi — 16.25%
- Chiarelettere — 9.84%
- SEIF – Società Editoriale Il Fatto — 9.64%
- Francesco Aliberti — 6.85%
- Other shareholders — 12.89%
- Free float — 28.25%

Newsstand price history: €1.20 (2009–2013); €1.30 (2013); €1.40 (2014–2015); €1.50 (from June 2015); €1.80 (2015–2019); €2.00 (2019–2024).

== Staff ==
At its founding, the newspaper's editorial staff numbered 16 journalists, in addition to editor Antonio Padellaro and deputy editor Marco Travaglio (who later became editor). The paper's commercial success later allowed for further hires and outside collaborations.

Notable contributors have included Nando dalla Chiesa, Massimo Fini, Marco Lillo, Daniele Luttazzi, Tomaso Montanari, Barbara Spinelli, Alessandro Barbero, Salvatore Cannavò, and cartoonists Riccardo Mannelli, Mario Natangelo and Vauro, among many others.

Former contributors include Gad Lerner (2020–2025), Furio Colombo (2009–2022), Pietrangelo Buttafuoco (until 2020), Stefano Feltri (2009–2020), Piergiorgio Odifreddi (2018–2020), Bruno Tinti (2009–2017) and Davide Vecchi (2010–2018), among others.

The paper's front-page daily satirical column, "Cattiverie" ("Nasty remarks"), frequently draws on material from the satirical website Spinoza.

=== Web edition staff ===
The website ilfattoquotidiano.it, registered as an independent publication, is directed by Peter Gomez, with Simone Ceriotti as deputy editor.

=== Committee of guarantors ===
The committee is charged with safeguarding the independence and quality of the newspaper's reporting across all media, including through a code of journalistic ethics. Its members are Peter Gomez, Marco Lillo, Antonio Padellaro and Marco Travaglio.

== Distribution ==
The newspaper is distributed with a print run of approximately 150,000 copies to more than 25,000 of Italy's roughly 38,000 newsstands, covering major cities and the whole of Emilia-Romagna, Friuli-Venezia Giulia, Lazio, Liguria, Lombardy, Marche, Sardinia, Sicily, Piedmont, Tuscany, Umbria, Veneto and Calabria. An online edition is available to subscribers, including via mobile apps for iOS and Android. The newsstand price is €2.

Circulation figures have varied considerably over the newspaper's history. In its first year (October 2009 – September 2010) the paper averaged 75,963 copies daily, excluding digital subscriptions, rising to 78,049 in the following twelve months. Sales then declined sharply, falling to around 52,849 copies per day in early 2012 (a drop of about 24% from the previous year's average of 71,109 copies, per data reported by Libero), while the number of paid subscriptions fell to 21,900 from 30,000 in 2011.

According to figures from Accertamenti Diffusione Stampa (ADS), circulation gradually declined over the following two years, from around 57,000 copies per day in April 2012 to a range of roughly 40,000–50,000 copies through most of 2013, before falling further to around 38,000 copies from November 2014. On 8 October 2009, the day after the Lodo Alfano was struck down by the Constitutional Court, the paper sold approximately 133,000 copies — its highest single-day figure.

From September 2015 to March 2017 the paper maintained average daily sales of around 36,000 copies, a figure that gradually declined to below 30,000 by January 2019. Excluding a temporary rise during the politically eventful months of August and September 2019 (36,199 and 30,847 copies respectively), the paper has since maintained daily sales of between roughly 25,000 and 29,000 copies, with a historic low of 24,811 copies in January 2020.

=== Circulation table ===
Combined print and digital circulation, selected years (ADS data)
Year	Total circulation (print + digital)	Digital circulation	Print circulation	Print run
2018	47,277	12,639	34,638	83,491
2017	43,996	10,471	33,525	82,549
2016	50,320	10,506	39,814	86,689
2015	45,380	9,086	36,294	81,734
2014	49,329	10,497	38,832	84,672
2013	60,758	13,145	47,613	104,364

Circulation moving average, 2010–2014
Year	Moving average
2014	43,552
2013	54,604
2012	49,640
2011	75,963
2010	78,584

Source: Accertamenti Diffusione Stampa (ADS)

=== Creative Commons licensing ===
Until 28 February 2014, content on the Il Fatto Quotidiano website was released under a Creative Commons Attribution-NonCommercial-NoDerivs 2.5 Italy licence. Although the site's terms of use were subsequently changed, content published before that date remains under the Creative Commons licence, since the licence terms specify that a licensor cannot revoke the granted rights so long as the licence's conditions continue to be met.

== Editors ==
=== Print edition ===
- Antonio Padellaro (23 September 2009 – 3 February 2015)
- Marco Travaglio (since 3 February 2015)

=== Online edition ===
- Peter Gomez (since 23 September 2009)

== Relations with the Five Star Movement ==
Some journalists and commentators — including former shareholder Michele Santoro and former contributor Luca Telese — have characterised the newspaper as politically close to the Five Star Movement.

According to a report in Il Foglio, in May 2019 Il Fatto Quotidiano journalists, following a newsroom meeting, sent a letter to editor Marco Travaglio accusing him of losing editorial impartiality and softening the paper's coverage of the Five Star Movement. In response, Il Fatto Quotidiano sent Il Foglio a rebuttal stating that the letter sent on 22 May by the newsroom committee to company management and the editor did not contain "harsh criticism of an editorial line increasingly slanted in support of the Five Star Movement," nor was there any "attempted mutiny," and that the newsroom had never questioned Travaglio's professionalism or independence, reaffirming its full confidence in him; the paper characterised the episode as ordinary dialogue between newsroom, management and editor, typical of a free press, and dismissed further characterisations as an attempt to discredit the newspaper and its staff.
