= Marco Patricelli =

Italian historian

Marco Patricelli (Pescara, 1963-) is an Italian historian, specializing in the history of Europe of the 20th century and the Second World War.

He is the author of a book about Witold Pilecki, Il volontario (2010), which received the Acqui Award of History that year.
