= Enrico Decleva =

Italian historian (1941–2020)

magnifico rettore Enrico Decleva
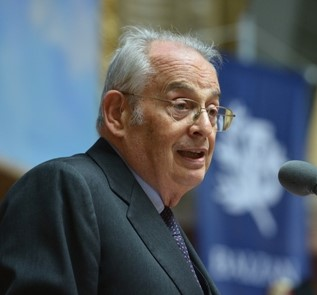

Rector of the University of Milan
- In office 2001–2012
- Preceded by: Paolo Mantegazza
- Succeeded by: Gianluca Vago

Enrico Decleva (18 April 1941 – 19 March 2020) was an Italian historian.

He became professor of modern history in the University of Milan in 1974 and full professor of contemporary history in 1976. He authored books on Carlo Rosselli, on the Società Umanitaria of Milan, and on the founder of the Arnoldo Mondadori Editore. For the latter, in 1994 he won the 27th Acqui Award of History.

He was dean of the Humanities school from 1986 to 1997, deputy rector from 1997 to 2001, and rector from 2001 to 2012. He served as vice president (2004) and then president (2008–2011) of the Conferenza dei rettori delle università italiane (CRUI; association of Italian rectors), and held several other offices in public and private entities.
