= Maria Rita Parsi =

Italian psychotherapist, writer and television commentator (1947–2026)

Maria Rita Parsi (5 August 1947 – 2 February 2026) was an Italian psychotherapist, writer and television commentator.

== Life and career ==
Parsi was born in Rome on 5 August 1947. She worked as teacher, educational psychologist and psychotherapist, and founded and directed SIPA (Italian School of Psychoanimation), a humanistic research institute.

In 1992, Parsi created the non-profit association "Fondazione Movimento Bambino", which works for legal and social protection of minors, against abuse and mistreatment, and to assist the cultural growth of children, parents, teachers, social-health and communication workers. She participated in numerous television programs as an expert in her disciplines and collaborated as a columnist for many national newspapers and periodicals and wrote, among others, for Il Messaggero, Il Resto del Carlino, Il Giorno, and La Nazione.

From 1995, she was registered as a freelance journalist with the Order of Journalists of Lazio.

Parsi died in February 2026, at the age of 78.
