= Gian Tommaso Scarascia Mugnozza =

Italian agronomist and geneticist

Gian Tommaso Scarascia Mugnozza (27 May 1925 – 28 February 2011) was an Italian agronomist and geneticist. He was born in Rome, Italy.

After graduating in agriculture at the University of Bari in 1946, he started teaching there and became a full professor in 1968. He was director of the ENEA Casaccia laboratory in Cesano, Rome. Other positions include; Dean of the Faculty of Agriculture at the University of Bari, chairman of the Agriculture and Forestry Commission of the Italian National Research Council, and rector at Tuscia University at Viterbo. He was president of the Accademia Nazionale delle Scienze and was a fellow of several Italian and foreign academies. His scientific research focused on wheat breeding and adaptation to arid and semi-arid climates. He coordinated national and international research programs in agriculture and plant breeding.

He also served as rector of Tuscia University.
