= Pietro Scoppola =

Italian politician

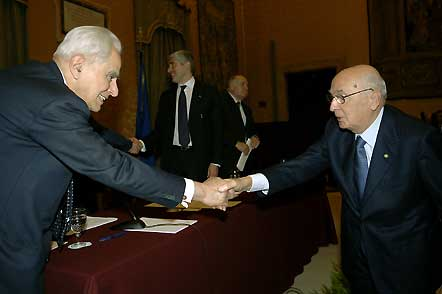
- Pietro Scoppola with Giorgio Napolitano

Senator of the Italian Republic
- In office 12 July 1983 – 1 July 1987
- Constituency: Lazio

Personal details
- Born: December 14, 1926
- Died: October 25, 2007 (aged 80)
- Party: Christian Democrat
- Occupation: Professor and historian

Pietro Scoppola (December 14, 1926 – October 25, 2007) was an Italian historian, academic, and politician.

== Biography ==
He taught at University of Rome La Sapienza and was senator for Christian Democracy from 1983 to 1987. He was also a Catholic who examined the church's relationship with the rise of fascism in Italy.

== Works ==
- Dal neoguelfismo alla Democrazia cristiana, Studium, 1957
- Crisi modernista e rinnovamento cattolico in Italia, Il Mulino, 1961
- Chiesa e Stato nella storia d'Italia, Laterza, 1967
- La Chiesa e il fascismo, Laterza, 1971
- La proposta politica di De Gasperi, Il Mulino, 1977
- La "nuova cristianità" perduta, Studium, 1985
- 25 aprile. Liberazione, Einaudi 1995
- La Repubblica dei partiti. Evoluzione e crisi di un sistema politico, Il Mulino, 1997
- La Costituzione contesa, Einaudi, 1998
- La democrazia dei cristiani, Il Mulino, 2005
