= Nicola Tranfaglia =

Italian politician (1938–2021)

Nicola Tranfaglia (Italy, 2 October 1938 – 23 July 2021) was an Italian politician who served as a member of the Chamber of Deputies.
