= Ernesto Olivero =

Italian activist and writer (born 1940)

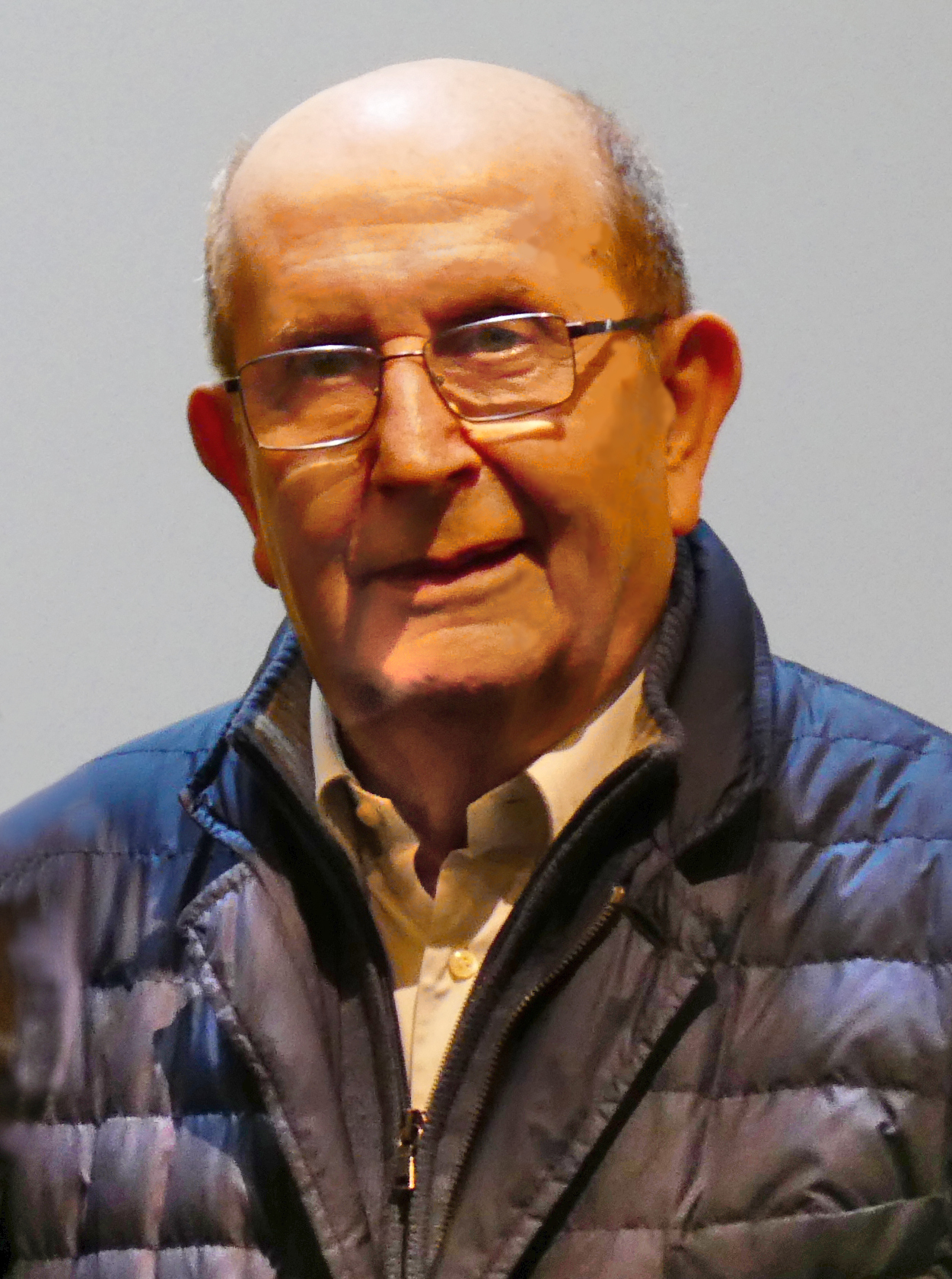
Ernesto Olivero in 2024

Ernesto Olivero (born 24 May 1940) is an Italian activist and writer, as well as the founder of the organisation Servizio missionario giovani (Sermig).

== Biography ==
Olivero is the youngest of nine brothers. He was born in Pandola, a village in the Province of Salerno, where his family moved for work. His father was originally from Boves (CN) and his mother from Avellino. He went to school first in Campania and then in Chieri, where he moved when he was 12 years old. He worked in some factories in the area, and later in a branch of San Paolo bank, until he decided to resign and to dedicate his life to fighting poverty.

=== Sermig ===
On his 24th birthday, on 24 May 1964, he founded Sermig (Servizio Missionario Giovani) together with his wife Maria Cerrato, whom he had met organizing the “Giornate Mossionarie Mondiali”, and with some friends that he was meeting weekly at home. This group, gathering young people, couples, monks and nuns, began to take care of poor and marginalized people in Turin following the Gospel teachings. The goal of the organisation is to eliminate hunger and big injustices in the world, to build peace, to help young people to find an ideal in life, raise public awareness about the problems of the poor in the third world.

Very soon the number of people engaged in the project increased. The seat of the group at the beginning was in the office of “Pontificie Opere Missionarie” and then, starting from 1969, in the church of Arcivescovado street.

The first years of the group overlapped with the protests of 1968. Even though the cultural climate pushed many Catholics at the time to support Gospel with Marx’s writings, Sermig volunteers wanted to position themselves as “simple Christians” without any political affiliation. In that period, the group raised founds and organized exhibitions, markets and benefit concerts with Nomadi, Al Bano and Romina Power, Adriano Celentano and others, with sometimes a big public response. In particular, on February 23, 1969, Olivero and the other Sermig activists managed to fill the urin for a concert by Celentaro, when, at that time, Celentano never had had a bigger audience than 3.000.

=== Peace Arsenal ===
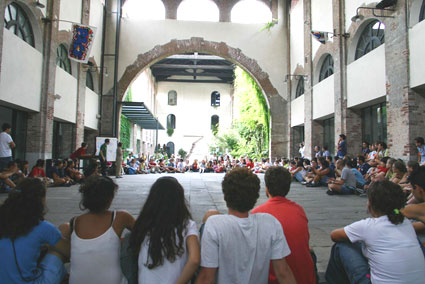
Entrance to the Peace Arsenal

On 2 August 1983 Olivero took over the management, after years of requests to the municipality of Turin, of a part of the structures of the old military arsenal located in the district of Borgo Dora, one of the infamous neighborhoods in town. Sermig together with the help of thousands of young volunteers coming from all over Italy restored completely the building, which then was in a bad state. The building was turned into "Peace Arsenal" ("Arsenale della Pace"), a structure extended over about 40.000 m^{2}.

From that time, the Arsenal defined itself as a “metropolitan monastery“ and gave assistance to immigrants, drug addicts, alcoholics, AIDS patients and homeless. In the 1990s, young people of the Arsenal started the movement Giovani della Pace.

In 1996, Olivero opened Arsenal of Hope in São Paulo in Brazil and in 2003, Arsenal of Meeting in Madaba in Jordan.

In 2006, Olivero and his fellows took over four kids for social care, who were famous for bullying a handicapped person.

== Activities ==
Many people (prisoners, young people in difficulty, abandoned mothers, and others) were reintegrated into society thanks to Ernesto Olivero and his movement: among them also some famous ex-prisoners and former prisoners who had life sentences, such as the crime boss Pietro Cavallero, personally known by Olivero in the 1970s. Meetings like these made him come up with the idea to implement, first in Italy, a cooperative between prisoners and free people during the Years of Lead.

Due to his reputation as a mediator and neutral person, he could also be, for example, one of the few civilians allowed into Lebanon for a peace mission in 1988 after many years in civil war. He was sent there by the Maronite patriarch Nasrallah Pierre Sfeir. He was also officially appointed a mediator by the Minister of Justice Giuliano Vassalli during the revolt in the prison of Porto Azzurro, on Elba island, in 1987.

He was friends with Mother Teresa and Pope John Paul II.

Among many young people who dedicate their life to the cause of his organisations, several opt for celibacy and choose the Arsenal as their home. This is why the Arsenal is recognized as an Institute of consecrated life by the Archdiocese of Turin.

Starting from 1976 Olivero published several books. The proceeds go into the Peace Arsenal project.

== Acknowledgments ==
Olivero has been awarded the Gold Medal for Civil Merit for his services. King Hussein of Jordan awarded him the first category Kawkab title. The Israeli organization Karen Keyemeth Leisrael dedicated the plantation of 18 trees in Jerusalem to him. The Path to Peace foundation of the United Nations nominated him as a Servitor Pacis in 1997.

In 2002, he was awarded the title Man of peace of Bethlehem and Jerusalem for his contribution to solve the siege of Siege of the Church of the Nativity in Bethlehem.

Pope John Paul II. entrusted him with the task of being “a faithful friend of all the abandoned children of the world“. In 1999, he received an honorary degree in sociology from Turin University.

Mother Teresa, John Paul II and Italians such as Norberto Bobbio and Giovanni Agnelli and foreign religious and secular personalities have repeatedly nominated him for the Nobel Peace Prize.

During a festival by Avvenire, held on 1 August 2018 in Lerici, he received the prize “Angelo Narducci” from Luigi Ernesto Palletti, bishop of La Spezia-Sarzana-Brugnato, in occasion of the 35th anniversary of the foundation of Peace Arsenal.
