= Luciano Modica =

Italian politician (1950–2021)

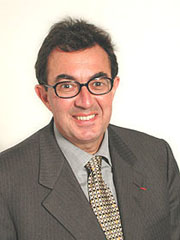
Luciano Modica

Luciano Modica (4 January 1950 – 4 May 2021) was an Italian politician. He was a senator from 2002 to 2006.
