= Cognitive opening =

A cognitive opening is a concept in social movement theory defined as a moment in which a catalytic event, sometimes a personal crisis or socioeconomic pressure, makes a person receptive to new ways of thinking because life changes challenge previously accepted beliefs, prompting a re-assessment of world views.

It is described as a potential stage towards radicalization. The catalytic event can be personal, such as a death in the family or a crime, or broader, such as being confronted by discrimination, socioeconomic crisis, or political repression directly as an individual or as a member of a group.

The origin of the concept is credited to Quintan Wiktorowicz's 2005 book, Radical Islam Rising: Muslim Extremism in the West.
