= Pietrangelo Buttafuoco =

Italian journalist and writer

Buttafuoco at the Biennale di Venezia 2026

Pietrangelo Buttafuoco, also known as Giafar Buttafuoco, is the president of the Venice Biennale, an Italian rightwing journalist and a public intellectual.

== Early life ==
Buttafuoco was born and raised in Catania, Sicily.

In 2015 he converted to Shia Islam, saying his change of faith was a reconciliation with the history of his native region.

== Career ==
Buttafuoco was a national leader of the youth wing of the Italian Social Movement (MSI), a neofascist party. He was a contemporary of Claudio Mutti, another former MSI convert to Shia Islam.

As a journalist, he worked with rightwing magazines and the then the publication, Il Secolo d'Italia. He served for five years as president of the regional theatre Teatro Stabile di Catania, and also as the president of the Teatro Stabile d'Abruzzo.

== Venice Biennale ==
Buttafuoco was nominated to be new head of the Venice Biennale Foundation in October 2023. Critics said his appointment was a sign of the rightwing takeover of Italian cultural posts.

Buttafuoco supported the inclusion of Russia and Israel into the 2026 Venice Biennale despite the protests over numerous artists and the Italian government which appointed him.

=== Controversy with Pussy Riot ===
On March 4, 2026, the performance group Pussy Riot issued a warning to "expect resistance", after the news became public about Russia's inclusion in the 2026 Biennale.

On March 10, 2026 a letter was signed by over 6,000 artists, including Nadya Tolokonnikova of Pussy Riot, claiming the decision to allow Russia to return to the Venice Biennale was part of Russia's soft power military doctrine.

On March 19, 2026 the group Pussy Riot published an open letter to Buttafuoco requesting access to the Giardini della Biennale during the Venice Biennale and claiming his support of Russian State artists but not dissidents was "performative".

On May 3 Luca Zaia commented that he had received a message from Pussy Riot and noted he had raised the issue directly with Buttafuoco.

On May 6, 2026, the group Pussy Riot staged a protest about Russia's inclusion. In a press conference after they claimed Buttafuoco denied any attempts at communication.

On May 7, 2026 police blocked the door to Buttafuoco's office, but had Nadya Tolokonnikova of Pussy Riot enter and hand write a letter to be delivered to him. Tolokonnikova appeared on a Euronews broadcast outside the blockaded door and claimed "We tried to contact [Buttafuoco] through every available means, but unfortunately, we received no response."

On May 12, 2026, in an interview, Tolokonnikova called Buttafuoco "a man as small as Putin" due to his avoidance of communication while championing open dialogue.
