= Teatro Stabile d'Abruzzo =

Teatro Stabile d'Abruzzo (TSA) is a theatre based in L'Aquila, Abruzzo, Italy which was formed in 2000.

Directed by Alessandro D'Alatri today, the theatre has performed at many major Italian festivals, including the Venice Biennale, the Festival dei Due Mondi in Spoleto, the Festival del Teatro di San Miniato, and at numerous theatrical festivals in Vicenza and Verona. Many of the productions of the Teatro Stabile d'Abruzzo have been recorded by the RAI.

In association with the Associazione Culturale Mamo, the theatrical group has put on productions of Jekyll & Hyde throughout Italy.
