= FrancoAngeli =

Coordinates: 45.4995°N 9.2214°E

- Status: Active
- Founded: 1955; 70 years ago
- Founder: Franco Angeli
- Country of origin: Italy
- Headquarters location: Milan
- Publication types: Books and journals for academic, professional and vocational training.
- Nonfiction topics: Social science, Law, Medicine, Sociology, Psychology, Education, Economics, Politics, Design
- Official website: www.francoangeli.it

FrancoAngeli is one of the largest Italian publishing houses specialized in books and journals for university and post-university studies, as well as for professionals.

Based in Milan and founded in 1955, it has one of the largest Italian catalogues, with more than 17,000 titles and more than 30,000 authors. Each year it publishes more than 1,000 new books and more than 80 journals. The main fields of its publishing activity are: management, psychology, sociology, education, vocational training, economics, business administration, social services, medicine and health, architecture, design, environment, politics, and law.

The founder, Franco Angeli, died November 3, 2007, at the age of 77 years. On November 2, 2008, his name was entered in the "Famedio" (Pantheon) of Milan.
