= Marco Travaglio =

Italian journalist and writer (born 1964)

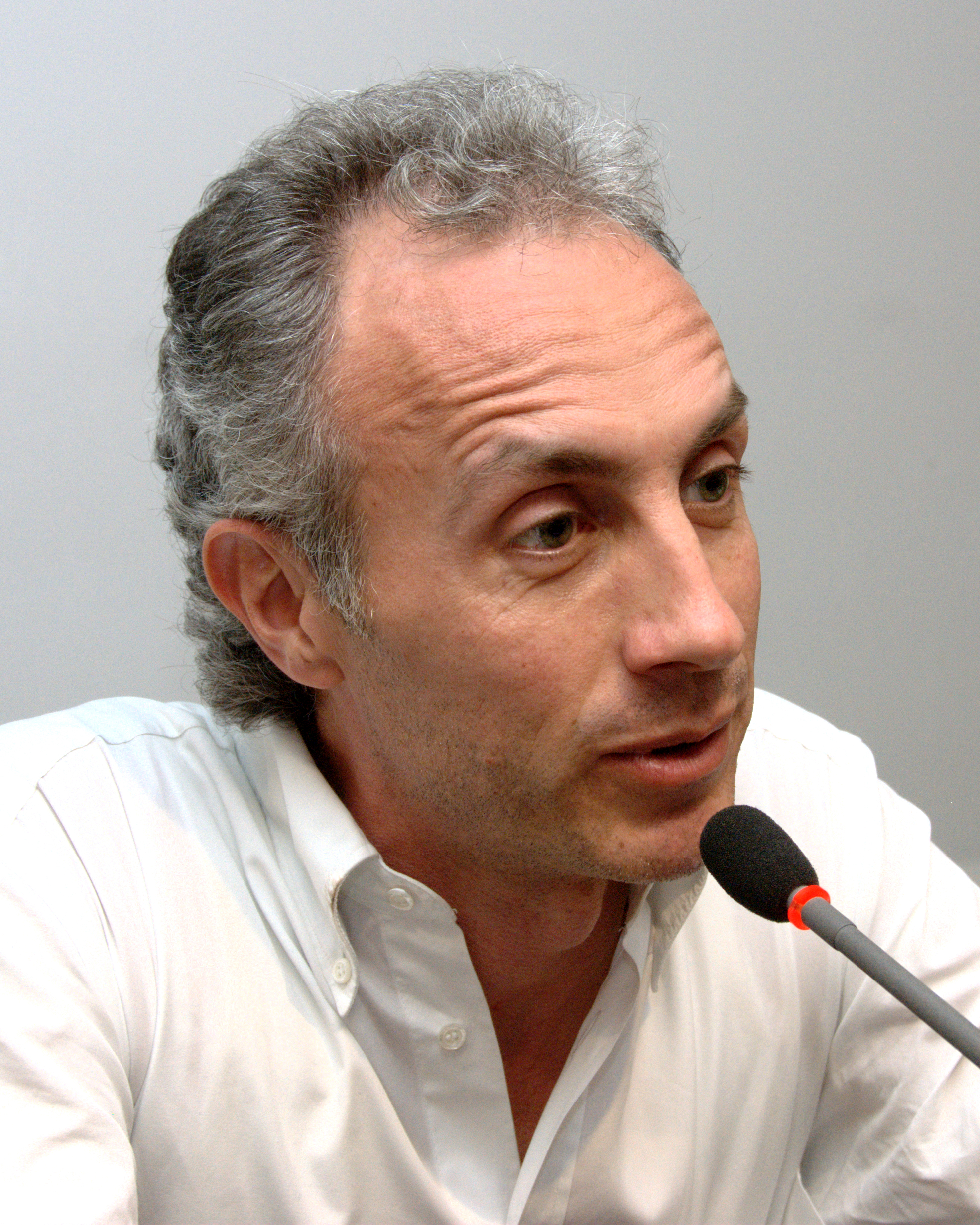
- Travaglio in 2010
- Born: 13 October 1964 (age 62); Turin, Italy
- Education: University of Turin
- Occupation: Journalist
- Years active: 1986–present

Marco Travaglio (Italian pronunciation: [ˈmarko traˈvaʎʎo]; born 13 October 1964) is an Italian journalist, writer, and pundit. Since 2015, he has been the editor-in-chief of the independent daily newspaper Il Fatto Quotidiano. Travaglio began his journalistic career in the late 1980s under Indro Montanelli at Il Giornale and La Voce, then in the 2000s worked at La Repubblica and L'Unità, before becoming one of the founders of Il Fatto Quotidiano in 2009. He is also the author of many books and a columnist for several other national newspapers and magazines, his main interests have been judicial reporting and current affairs and politics, dealing with issues ranging from the fight against the Italian Mafia to corruption.

An early critic of Silvio Berlusconi, Travaglio became one of the leading voices of anti-Berlusconism. Politically, he has described himself as a liberal, in the mold of Montanelli, and as being closer to the political right than the political left but that his criticism of Berlusconi found him asylum on the Left. He praised right-wing politicians, such as Ronald Reagan and Margaret Thatcher, and said he belongs to the liberal Right of Camillo Benso, Count of Cavour, Luigi Einaudi, Alcide De Gasperi, and Montanelli. He said he voted for those who had the best chance to remove Berlusconi from power and for anti-corruption parties, such as Italy of Values and Civil Revolution. Since the early 2010s, he has been politically close to and supportive of the Five Star Movement.

== Career ==
Travaglio was born in Turin, Italy, the son of a Turinese surveyor who was a train designer at Fiat Ferroviaria; his brother, Franco Travaglio, is an author, director, and librettist of modern musicals. After having obtained his classical high school diploma at the Liceo salesiano Valsalice in Turin with a score of 58/60, he graduated in modern literature with a thesis on contemporary history at the University of Turin at the age of 32, after becoming a professional journalist in 1986.

In the late 1980s, Travaglio began to pursue journalism as a career, and he started out writing for Catholic publications, such as Il nostro tempo ("Our Time"), where he met Mario Giordano. He then worked under the renowned journalist Indro Montanelli for newspapers like Il Giornale (1987–1994) and La Voce (1994–1995), and gained the attention of Montanelli himself, who once said of him that he makes use of "a more refined and not legally punishable weapon: the archives". During this period, Travaglio began to collaborate with Enzo Biagi, who hosted the television program Il Fatto. After the closure of La Voce, this activity was joined by collaboration with various newspapers and periodicals. From 1998 to 2009, Travaglio worked at La Repubblica (1998–2002) and L'Unità (2002–2009), where he hosted columns like "Bananas", "Uliwood Party", and "Zorro". Between 2006 and 2011, he was also a regular guest of the TV program AnnoZero, hosted by Michele Santoro.

During his career, Travaglio contributed as a columnist to prominent national newspapers and magazines, such as Sette, Cuore, Il Messaggero, Il Giorno, L'Indipendente, Il Borghese, La Padania, L'Espresso (hosting the "Sigornò" column after the death of Claudio Rinaldi), MicroMega, A, linus, Giudizio Universale, and La voce del ribelle. From 2008 to 2011, he edited the weekly streamed column "Passaparola" for the political commentator and future leader Beppe Grillo's blog, which was later also broadcast by Current TV. In September 2009, alongside Furio Colombo, Peter Gomez, Marco Lillo, Cinzia Monteverdi, and Antonio Padellaro, Travaglio contributed to the founding of the independent newspaper Il Fatto Quotidiano ("The Daily Fact"). He became editor-in-chief of the paper in 2015. Since 2018, he has edited a weekly column called "Balle Spaziali" on the Loft web portal of Il Fatto Quotidiano.

Political and judicial events of national importance, from Mani pulite to the troubles of controversial political figure Silvio Berlusconi, have been Travaglio's main area of interest. As a journalist, he gained public attention in 2001 after participating in a TV show on the state-owned national channel Rai 2 called Satyricon and hosted by Daniele Luttazzi. He then introduced his bestseller book L'odore dei soldi ("The Scent of Money", co-authored by Elio Veltri), which investigates the origin of Berlusconi's early fortunes. Berlusconi filed a lawsuit for slander; since the information was accurate and well documented, he was condemned to pay the legal expenses. The show, which aired during the campaign for the 2001 Italian general election, was heavily criticized by Berlusconi and his party, and labelled by them as a politically motivated, non-objective personal attack. After his victory in the general election, Berlusconi banned Luttazzi (together with Enzo Biagi and Michele Santoro, two prominent journalists who had criticized Berlusconi or investigated his history) from state-owned TV shows (the editto bulgaro), causing a long debate about freedom of information and censorship in Italy.

On 10 May 2008, Travaglio commented on Renato Schifani's election as president of the Senate of the Republic that one should "simply ask of the second highest office of the state to explain those relationships with those men who have subsequently been condemned for association with the Mafia" on the RAI current affairs talk show television program Che tempo che fa. The statement of Travaglio resulted in fierce negative reactions from Italian politicians, including from the Italian centre-left, except for Antonio Di Pietro, who said that Travaglio was "merely doing his job". Some called for chief executives at RAI to be dismissed. Grillo supported Travaglio, while Schifani announced he would go to court and sue Travaglio for slander. Schifani said Travaglio's accusation was based on "inconsistent or manipulated facts, not even worthy of generating suspicions", adding that "someone wants to undermine the dialogue between the government and the opposition". In February 2009, the German Association of Journalists assigned Travaglio its annual award for Freedom of the Press, describing him as a "brave and critical colleague ... exposing continually the attempts of Italian politicians, especially Silvio Berlusconi, to influence the media to their advantage and to negate critical reports."

Since his rise to prominence, Travaglio has been a polarizing and at times controversial figure. Of Travaglio, Grillo said in October 2007 that he wanted him as the Italian Minister of Justice. Of the oppositive view was Fausto Bertinotti, then leader of the Communist Refoundation Party, who said that Travaglio was distant from his way of thinking, methods, and polemics, including what he described as Travaglio's justicialism (giustizialismo) compared to his cultural garantismo, and in October 2005 had joked that hearing his name gave him hives. In 2005, former Italian president Francesco Cossiga described Travaglio as "a dirty, right-wing fascist", while Pier Ferdinando Casini, the then president of the Chamber of Deputies, joked in 2006 that Travaglio would become jobless if Berlusconi were to die.

== Political views ==
Travaglio considers himself as having always been a liberal or, in his own words, "liberal-Montanellian". During his 2001 interview given to Daniele Luttazzi in the television program Satyricon, he said he was a liberal ("a pupil of Montanelli") who found asylum in the Left without identifying himself as leftist. In 2010, he confirmed such statements, saying he has ideas closer to positions that in other countries are normally represented by the Right. A Catholic, he has been described as coming from the Catholic right. In a letter sent to Il Giornale in 2007, he referred to himself as an anti-communist Catholic.

In a 2008 interview given to Claudio Sabelli Fioretti contained in the book Il rompiballe, Travaglio said: "In France I would vote with closed eyes for a Chirac, a Villepin. ... I would surely vote for Merkel. I liked very much Reagan and Thatcher." In Il rompiballe, he described Giorgia Meloni, a right-wing politician and future prime minister of Italy, as "fantastic, very good", and "committed, enthusiastic, competent", while of Roberto Maroni, a minister in Berlusconi's government, he said that he was "a decent minister". Travaglio concluded that "my Right doesn't exist. It's imaginary. It's the liberal Right. Cavour, Einaudi, De Gasperi, Montanelli. All dead."

During Rai 2's television program Dodicesimo round, Travaglio stated that in the 2006 Italian general election he had voted on the Senate "without holding my nose for the first time" because, in his own words, "Italy of Values made me the gift of candidating a person that I esteem and that has honored me of her friendship, Franca Rame." On 29 March 2008, Antonio Di Pietro's blog published an article by Travaglio in which he publicly expressed his vote for Italy of Values for the 2008 Italian general election and confirmed his liberal leanings, adding that he was still "waiting for a new Einaudi or a new De Gasperi". On 5 June 2009, on the eve of the 2009 European Parliament election in Italy, he stated he would vote for Italy of Values because he was satisfied with its way of opposing the fourth Berlusconi government.

Interviewed by Antonello Piroso on 22 March 2011 on the television programme Niente di personale on La7, Travaglio revealed that in the 1996 Italian general election he had voted for Lega Nord in one of the two legislative chambers and for Romano Prodi's The Olive Tree in the other chamber. He explained his vote for Lega Nord as the fulfillment of a promise he had made to himself after leaving Il Giornale in 1994: he would have voted for whoever would throw down Berlusconi. For the 2013 Italian general election, in an article published on MicroMega and also in the La7 television programs Servizio pubblico by Michele Santoro and Otto e mezzo by Lilli Gruber, he announced his vote for Civil Revolution in the Chamber of Deputies and the Five Star Movement in the Senate. For the 2016 Italian constitutional referendum about the Renzi–Boschi reform, Travaglio supported the "No" campaign and wrote a book against the reform. On the 8 March 2018 episode of Otto e mezzo, Travaglio stated that he had voted for the Five Star Movement in the 2018 Italian general election. For the 2020 Italian constitutional referendum about the reduction of the number of MPs, Travaglio supported the "Yes".

In February 2022, Travaglio called the news of an impending Russian invasion of Ukraine an "American fake news", doing so even the day before the invasion started, which resulted in criticism, as well as being listed among denialists of the invasion. He is a leading critic of Volodymyr Zelenskyy, and his stances have been criticized as anti-Ukraine and pro-Vladimir Putin.

In June 2023, upon the death and state funeral of Berlusconi, Travaglio was critical towards what he perceived as a beatification of the deceased leader, citing his multiple scandals.

== Awards and honours ==
Travaglio won the Political Satire Award in Forte dei Marmi (2007) for his columns on L'Unità, the Press Freedom Award (2009) of the National Association of German Journalists, and the Premiolino (2010).

== Works ==
Travaglio is the author of over fifty books. Some of Travaglio's works, such as È Stato la mafia (2013) and Slurp (2015), were adapted for the theatre and theatrical monologues. Additional theatrical works include Promemoria: 15 anni di storia d'Italia (2009) and Anestesia totale (2011). Several books by Travaglio are co-authored, usually with other investigative journalists.

2000s

- Il manuale del perfetto impunito. Come delinquere e vivere felici ("The Manual of the Perfect Unpunished: How to Commit a Crime and Live Happily"). Milan: Garzanti. ISBN 978-88-1173-870-1. Published in 2000, it is a witty denouncement of the linguistic trickery used by certain politicians, jurists, and writers to delegitimate the Italian magistrature's inquiries into corruption, such as during the Mani pulite (Italian for "Clean Hands") national scandal of the 1990s.
- L'odore dei soldi. Origini e misteri delle fortune di Silvio Berlusconi ("The Smell of Money: Origins and Mysteries of Silvio Berlusconi's Fortunes"). Rome: Editori Riuniti. ISBN 978-88-3595-007-3. Published in 2001 and co-authored with Elio Veltri, it reports on Silvio Berlusconi's rise in politics and mafia allegations.
- Bravi ragazzi. La requisitoria Boccassini, l'autodifesa di Previti & C. Tutte le carte dei processi Berlusconi-toghe sporche ("Good Fellas: The Boccassini Indictment, the Self-Defense of Previti & C. All the Papers of the Berlusconi Dirty Robes Trials"). Rome: Editori Riuniti. ISBN 978-88-3595-374-6. Published in 2003 and co-authored with Peter Gomez, it reports on Berlusconi's and fellow politician Cesare Previti's alleged corruption of judges, which was later confirmed by a court's sentence.
- Lo chiamavano impunità. La vera storia del caso Sme e tutto quello che Berlusconi nasconde all'Italia e all'Europa ("They Call Him Impunity: The True Story of the SME Case and All that Berlusconi Is Hiding from Italy and Europe"). Rome: Editori Riuniti. ISBN 978-88-3595-437-8. Published in 2003 and co-authored with Peter Gomez, it is about the SME-Ariosto inquiry and court trial; the title is a humorous reference to the 1970 Spaghetti Western film Lo chiamavano Trinità.
- Montanelli e il cavaliere. Storia di un grande e di un piccolo uomo ("Montanelli and the Knight: The Story of a Big Man and a Little Man"). Milan: Garzanti. ISBN 978-88-1160-034-3. Published in 2004, it reports on Berlusconi and Indro Montanelli's diatribe, which led to Montanelli leaving Il Giornale. The title refers to Montanelli as the big man and Berlusconi, referencing his nickname (il Cavaliere), as the little man.
- Regime. Biagi, Santoro, Massimo Fini, Freccero, Luttazzi, Sabina Guzzanti, Paolo Rossi, tg, gr e giornali: storie di censure e bugie nell'Italia di Berlusconi ("Regime: Biagi, Santoro, Massimo Fini, Freccero, Luttazzi, Sabina Guzzanti, Paolo Rossi, News, Radio Journals and Newspapers. Stories of Censorship and Lies in Berlusconi's Italy"). Milan: Rizzoli. ISBN 978-88-1700-246-2. Published in 2004 and co-authored with Peter Gomez, it details the biggest cases of censorship in Italy in the past two years.
- Inciucio. Come la sinistra ha salvato Berlusconi. La grande abbuffata Rai e le nuove censure di regime, da Molière al caso Celentano. L'attacco all'Unità e l'assalto al Corriere ("The Scam: How the Left Saved Berlusconi. The Great Rai Binge and the New Regime Censorships, from Molière to the Celentano Case. The Attack on L'Unità and the Assault on the Corriere"). Milan: Rizzoli. ISBN 978-88-1701-020-7. Published in 2005 and co-authored with Peter Gomez, it argues how through inciucio — an unholy political alliance or underhand agreement — the opposing Italian political forces would have divided between them the authorities of RAI and the changes within two well-known Italian newspapers like L'Unità and the Corriere della Sera.
- La scomparsa dei fatti. Si prega di abolire le notizie per non disturbare le opinioni ("The Disappearance of Facts: Please Abolish the News So as Not to Disturb the Opinions"). Milan: il Saggiatore. ISBN 978-88-4281-395-8. Published in 2006, it is a critical analysis of the information system in Italy that, in the words of Travaglio, is "programmatically emptied of contents, sick of revisionism, corrupt, mercenary, essentially lying."
- Mani sporche. 2001-2007. Così destra e sinistra si sono mangiate la II repubblica. ("Dirty Hands: 2001–2007. Thus the Right and Left Ate Up the Second Republic"). Milan: Chiarelettere. ISBN 978-88-6190-002-8. Published in 2007 and co-authored with Gianni Barbacetto and Peter Gomez, it reports about the years following Mani pulite and those of the Second Italian Republic.
- Il bavaglio. Bloccare i processi, cancellare l'informazione, difendersi con l'impunità. Ecco perché Belusconi sta preparando il bavaglio ("The Gag: Block the Proceedings, Erase Information, Defend Oneself With Impunity. That's Why Belusconi Is Preparing the Gag"). Milan: Chiarelettere. ISBN 978-88-6190-062-2. Published in 2008 and co-authored with Peter Gomez and Marco Lillo, it is about the fourth Berlusconi government's plans to limit freedom of speech and the investigative means of Italian prosecutors investigating political corruption in Italy.
- Per chi suona la banana. Il suicidio dell'Unione Brancaleone e l'eterno ritorno di Al Tappone ("For Whom the Banana Tolls: The Suicide of the Brancaleone Union and the Eternal Return of Al Tappone"). Milan: Garzanti. ISBN 978-88-1169-452-6. Published in 2008, it discusses the fall of the Prodi government and the return of Berlusconi; the title is a pun on For Whom the Bell Tolls, with a reference on the banana republic, as well as references to the 1966 comedy film L'armata Brancaleone and gangster Al Capone.
- Italia Anno Zero ("Italy Year Zero"). Milan: Chiarelettere. ISBN 978-88-6190-051-6. Published in 2009, it is co-authored with Beatrice Borromeo and Vauro Senesi, and recalls the 2006–2009 period, which saw the second Prodi government, followed by the fourth Berlusconi government and the 2008 financial crisis.

2010s

- Ad personam. 1994-2010. Così destra e sinistra hanno privatizzato la democrazia ("Ad Personam: 1994–2010. Thus the Right and Left Privatized Democracy"). Milan: Chiarelettere. ISBN 978-88-6190-104-9. Published in 2010, it is a critique of the Italian government justice system's reforms.
- Colti sul Fatto. Nani e pagliacci, muffe e lombrichi di fine regime sul «Fatto Quotidiano» ("Caught on the Fact: Dwarfs and Clowns, Mold and Earthworms of the End of the Regime on the 'Fatto Quotidiano'"). Milan: Garzanti. ISBN 978-88-1113-210-3. Published in 2010, it discusses the establishment of Il Fatto Quotidiano.
- Mani pulite. La vera storia. Per chi non c'era, per chi ha dimenticato, per chi continua a rubare e a mentire ("Mani Pulite: The True Story. For Those Who Weren't There, for Those Who Have Forgotten, for Those Who Continue to Steal and Lie"). Milan: Chiarelettere. ISBN 978-88-6190-300-5. Published in 2012 and co-authored with Gianni Barbacetto and Peter Gomez, it re-tells the history of Mani pulite. It was re-published in 2022 under the same title.
- BerlusMonti. 2010-2012. Venne il diluvio universale, l'Italia affogò, ma sull'arca dei tecnici uno solo si salvò: il solito ("BerlusMonti: 2010–2012. The Universal Flood Came, Italy Drowned, But Only One of the Technocrats Was Saved: The Usual One"). Milan: Garzanti. ISBN 978-88-1160-150-0. Published in 2012, it discusses Italy in the aftermath of the Great Recession, Berlusconi's bunga bunga parties, and the appointment of Mario Monti as the prime minister of Italy at the head of a technocratic government; the title is a play of Berlusconi's and Monti's surname.
- L' illusionista. Ascesa e caduta di Umberto Bossi ("The Illusionist: The Rise and Fall of Umberto Bossi"). Milan: Chiarelettere. ISBN 978-88-6190-367-8. Published in 2012 and co-authored with Pino Corrias and Renato Pezzini, it is a biography of Umberto Bossi, the long-time leader of Lega Nord.
- Viva il re! Giorgio Napolitano, il presidente che trovò una repubblica e ne fece una monarchia ("Long Live the King! Giorgio Napolitano, the President Who Found a Republic and Made It a Monarchy"). Milan: Chiarelettere. ISBN 978-88-6190-484-2. Published in 2013, it is a critique of Giorgio Napolitano as the president of Italy and his unprecedented decision to seek a second term.
- È Stato la mafia. Tutto quello che non vogliono farci sapere sulla trattativa e sulla resa ai boss delle stragi ("Mafia Is State: Everything They Don't Want Us to Know About the Negotiation and Surrender to the Bosses of the Massacres"). Milan: Chiarelettere. ISBN 978-88-6190-477-4. Published in 2014, it discusses the State–Mafia Pact; the title is a pun as the same sentence means "It was the mafia" even though "È stata la mafia" would be grammatically correct.
- Slurp. Dizionario delle lingue italiane. Lecchini, cortigiani e penne alla bava al servizio dei potenti che ci hanno rovinati ("Slurp. Dictionary of Italian Tongues. Ass-Lickers, Courtiers and Penne alla Bava Serving the Powerful Who Have Ruined Us"). Milan: Chiarelettere. ISBN 978-88-6190-635-8. Published in 2015, the title is a sarcastic reference to Travaglio's perceived attitude of some to heap praise on those in power, including politicians, bankers, and entrepreneurs, covering a period of twenty years.
- Perché no. Tutto quello che bisogna sapere sul referendum d'autunno contro la schiforma Boschi-Verdini (Why No: Everything You Need to Know About the Autumn Referendum Against the Awful Boschi–Verdini Reform"). Rome: PaperFirst. ISBN 978-88-9978-403-4. Published in 2016 and co-authored with Silvia Truzzi, it is a critique of the Renzi government's reforms that were subjected to the 2016 Italian constitutional referendum.
- B. come Basta! Fatti e misfatti, disastri e bugie, leggi vergogna e delitti (senza castighi) dell'ometto di Stato che vuole ricomprarsi l'Italia per la quarta volta ("B. Enough! Facts and Misdeeds, Disasters and Lies, Laws Shame and Crimes (Without Punishment) of the Mistress of the State Who Wants to Buy Back Italy for the Fourth Time"). Rome: PaperFirst. ISBN 978-88-9978-426-3. Published in 2018, it is a critical analysis of the political career of Berlusconi and his related scandals, among other controversies surrounding Berlusconi.
- Padrini fondatori. La sentenza sulla trattativa Stato-mafia che battezzò col sangue la Seconda Repubblica ("Founding Godfathers: The Ruling on the State–Mafia Negotiation that Baptized the Second Republic with Blood"). Rome: PaperFirst. ISBN 978-88-9978-465-2. Published in 2018 and co-authored with Marco Lillo, it is a critical analysis of the State–Mafia Pact.

2020s

- Bugiardi senza gloria. Tutto quello che ci ha fatto credere la stampa dei padroni (e non era vero) ("Inglourious Liars: Everything the Bosses' Press Made Us Believe (And It Wasn't True)"). Rome: PaperFirst. ISBN 978-88-9978-484-3. Published in 2020, it is a critical analysis of things Travaglio says have been widely believed to be true but that were false, such as Giulio Andreotti being acquitted, the State–Mafia Pact being mere allegations, Berlusconi being persecuted by judges, Bettino Craxi as a martyr, Mani pulite as a communist or CIA plot, or Karima El Mahroug being the niece of the then Egyptian president Hosni Mubarak, among others.
- I segreti del Conticidio. Il «golpe buono» e il «governo dei migliori» ("The Secrets of Conticide: The 'Good Coup' and the 'Government of the Best'"). Rome: PaperFirst. ISBN 978-88-9978-465-2. Published in 2021, it is a critical analysis of the fall of the second Conte government, headed by Giuseppe Conte (the title is a play of words between Conte and -cide, "homicide"), and the establishment of the Draghi government, a national unity government headed by Mario Draghi.
- Indro: il 900. Racconti e immagini di una vita straordinaria ("Indro: The 1900s. Stories and Images of an Extraordinary Life"). Milan: Rizzoli. ISBN 978-88-1715-920-3. Published in 2021, it is a biography of Montanelli.
- Scemi di guerra. La tragedia dell'Ucraina, la farsa dell'Italia. Un Paese pacifista preso in ostaggio dai NoPax ("Useful Idiots of War: The Tragedy of Ukraine, the Farce of Italy. A Pacifist Country Taken Hostage by the NoPax"). Rome: PaperFirst. ISBN 979-12-5543-010-0. Published in 2023, it discusses the Russo-Ukrainian War.

Media offices
Preceded by –	Journalist for Il Giornale; 1988–1994	Succeeded by –
Preceded by –	Journalist for La Voce; 1994–1995	Succeeded by –
Preceded by –	Journalist for La Repubblica; 1998–2001	Succeeded by –
Preceded by –	Journalist for L'Unità; 2002–2009	Succeeded by –
Preceded by –	Journalist for Il Fatto Quotidiano; Since 2009	Succeeded by –
