= Censorship in Italy =

Censorship in Italy applies to all media and print media. Many of the laws regulating freedom of the press in the modern Italian Republic come from the liberal reform promulgated by Giovanni Giolitti in 1912, which also established universal suffrage for all male citizens of the Kingdom of Italy. Many of these liberal laws were repealed by the Mussolini government already during the first years of government, such as via the "ultra-fascist" laws of 1926.

In Italy, freedom of the press is guaranteed by the Constitution of 1948. This freedom was specifically established in response to the censorship which occurred during the fascist regime of Benito Mussolini (1922–1943). Censorship continues to be an issue of debate in the modern era. In 2015, Freedom House classified the Italian press as "partly free", while in the report of the same year Reporters Without Borders placed Italy in 73rd place in the world for freedom of the press.

== Censorship during Italian unification (1814–1861) ==
During Italian unification, in the period following the Congress of Vienna (1814–1815), incisive control over the press by the monarchies was in place on Italian territory. In the capitals of the various states, and in the most important urban centres, generally only one official sheet of the monarchy was issued, generally entitled Gazzetta, which was used for the publication of laws and carefully selected news.

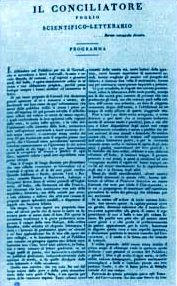
Il Conciliatore

In addition to these, however, there were literary and cultural periodicals, where new ideas could be expressed. In 1816, on the initiative of the Austrians, a literary monthly magazine entitled Biblioteca Italiana was founded in Milan, in which over 400 intellectuals and men of letters from all over Italy were invited to collaborate (not always successfully). This magazine was counterbalanced by Il Conciliatore, a statistical-literary periodical close to the romantic ideas of Madame de Staël, which continued to appear until 1819 when it was forced to close.

The situation of Italian journalism began to change with the foundation of numerous clandestine newspapers, printed by Carbonari nuclei and underground revolutionary movements, which led to the uprisings of 1820–1821. One of the best-known newspapers of this period is L'Illuminismo, published in the Papal Legations in 1820, along with La Minerva of Naples and La Sentinella Subalpina of Turin. In the same period, there was also a certain journalistic activism in Italian liberal circles. In fact, Antologia, a journal of science, literature and arts, founded in Florence in 1821, the Genoese Corriere Mercantile of 1824 and L'Indicatore genovese, to which the young Giuseppe Mazzini also collaborated, date back to those years.

Changes regarding freedom of the press occurred in 1847 and 1848 during the popular uprisings that occurred in those years, following new measures:

- Edict of Pope Pius IX of 15 March 1847;
- Law of Leopold II, Grand Duke of Tuscany, of 6 May 1847;
- Edict of King Charles Albert of Sardinia of 26 March 1848;
- Decree of King Ferdinand II of the Two Sicilies of 29 January 1848.

These measures had the effect of limiting preventive censorship of the press.

In Florence the following were published: La Zanzara (1849); La Frusta (1849); Il Popolano (1848–1849); L'Arte (1848–1859) in which Carlo Collodi collaborated, Buon gusto (1851–1864); La Speranza (1851–1859); Etruria (1851–1852); Il Genio (23 December 1852–31 June 1854); Lo Scaramuccia (1853–1859); La Polimazia di famiglia (1854–1856); L'Eco d'Europa (1854–1856); L'Eco dei Teatri (1854–1856); L'Indicatore Teatrale (1855–1858); L'Avvisatore (1856–1859); L'Imparziale (1856–1867); Lo Spettatore (1855–59); Il Passatempo (1856–1858); La Lanterna di Diogene (1856–1859); La Lente (1856–1861) in which Carlo Collodi collaborated; L'Arlecchino (1858); Il Caffè (1858); Il Carlo Goldoni (1858); Piovano Arlotto (1858–1862); and Il Poliziano, from January to June 1859.

The Agenzia Stefani was founded in 1853 in Turin by Guglielmo Stefani. In Genoa in 1860, at the instigation of Giuseppe Mazzini, L'Unità Italiana was founded. In the wake of the Expedition of the Thousand, the following were founded in the same year: L'Ineditore in Palermo and in Naples the Mazzinian Il Popolo d'Italia.

== Censorship in liberal Italy (1861–1922) ==
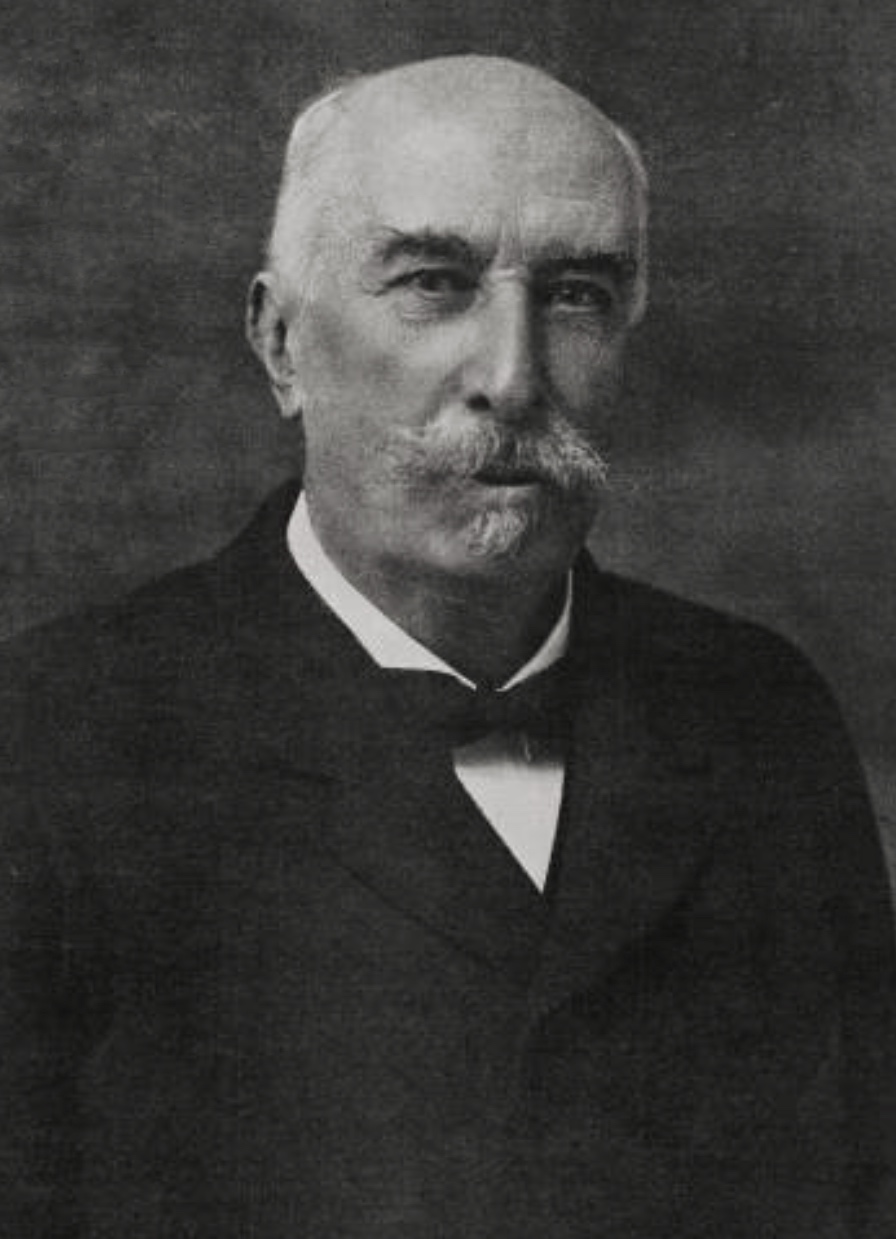
Giovanni Giolitti

Many of the laws regulating freedom of the press in the modern Italian Republic come from the liberal reform promulgated by Giovanni Giolitti in 1912, which also established universal suffrage for all male citizens of the Kingdom of Italy. Many of these liberal laws were repealed by the Mussolini government already during the first years of government.

The first law that introduced a real censorship intervention in the unified Italy was the one relating to cinema screenings and dates back to 1913. With this law the representation of obscene or shocking shows or those contrary to decency, decorum, public order and the prestige of institutions and authorities was prevented. The subsequent regulation, issued in 1914, listed a long series of prohibitions and transferred the power of intervention from the local public security authorities to the Ministry of the Interior. In 1920, with a Royal Decree, a commission was established, which among other things had the task of preventively viewing the film script before filming began.

On 23 May 1915, during World War I, with decrees nos. 674, 675 and 689, censorship of the press and mail was established. Newspapers cannot provide information on the number of wounded, prisoners and fallen, on appointments and changes in military high command, other than that contained in official press releases. Some changes were introduced to the public security law; the prefects have the power to order the seizure of a newspaper and its suspension after two subsequent seizures. For the entire duration of the war, the authorities responsible for controlling the press, eager to present an optimistic picture of the situation to the public, suggested to the newspapers how to select the news. The pressure from the authorities, combined with the expectations of the public, who wanted to read only positive news in the newspapers, caused the Italian press to self-censor.

The newspapers, despite receiving well-detailed news from the front from their war correspondents, did not publish everything. They voluntarily concealed part of the news from the reading public, publishing articles that hid, and in some cases falsified, much of the truth. On 19 November 1918, after the end of the war, the causes of seizure of periodic publications were limited to information of a military nature and untruthful news that could cause alarm in public opinion or disturb international relations. With the decree of 29 June 1919, the restrictive regulations that came into force in the spring of 1915 were repealed; at the same time, the general director of public security, Vincenzo Quaranta, reduced surveillance on the media.

== Censorship in Italy under Fascism (1922–1943) ==
Censorship in Italy was not created with Fascism, nor did it end with it, but it had a heavy influence in the life of Italians under the Regime.

The main goals of censorship under fascism were, concisely:

- Control over the public appearance of the regime, also obtained with the deletion of any content that could allow opposition, suspicions, or doubts about fascism.
- Constant check of the public opinion as a measure of consensus.
- Creation of national and local archives (schedatura) in which each citizen was filed and classified depending on their ideas, habits, relationships and any shameful acts or situations which had arisen; in this way, censorship was used as an instrument for the creation of a police state.

Censorship fought ideological and defeatist contents, and any other work or content that would not enforce nationalist fascism.

=== Censorship in public communications ===
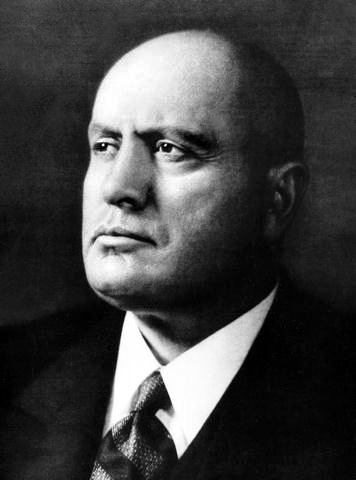
Benito Mussolini

This branch of the activity was mainly ruled by the Ministero della Cultura Popolare (Ministry of popular culture), commonly abbreviated as "Min. Cul. Pop.". This administration had authority over all the contents that could appear in newspapers, radio, literature, theatre, cinema, and generally any other form of communication or art.

In literature, editorial industries had their own controlling servants steadily on site, but sometimes it could happen that some texts reached the libraries and in this case, an efficient organization was able to capture all the copies in a very short time.

On the issue of censoring foreign language use, the idea of autarky effectively banned foreign languages, and any attempt to use a non-Italian word resulted in a formal censoring action. Reminiscences of this ban could be detected in the dubbing of all foreign movies broadcast on RAI (Italian state owned public service broadcaster): captioning is very rarely used.
Censorship did not however impose heavy limits on foreign literature, and many works by foreign authors were freely readable. Those authors could freely frequent Italy and even write about it, with no reported troubles.

In 1930, it was forbidden to distribute books that contained Marxist, Socialist or Anarchist like ideologies, but these books could be collected in public libraries in special sections not open to the general public. The same happened for the books that were sequestrated. All these texts could be read under authorization for scientific or cultural purposes, but it is said that this permission was quite easy to obtain. In 1938, there were public bonfires of forbidden books, enforced by fascist militias ("camicie nere"). Any work containing themes about Jewish culture, freemasonry, communist, or socialist ideas, was removed also by libraries (but it has been said that effectively the order was not executed with zeal, being a very unpopular position of the Regime).

=== Censorship and press ===
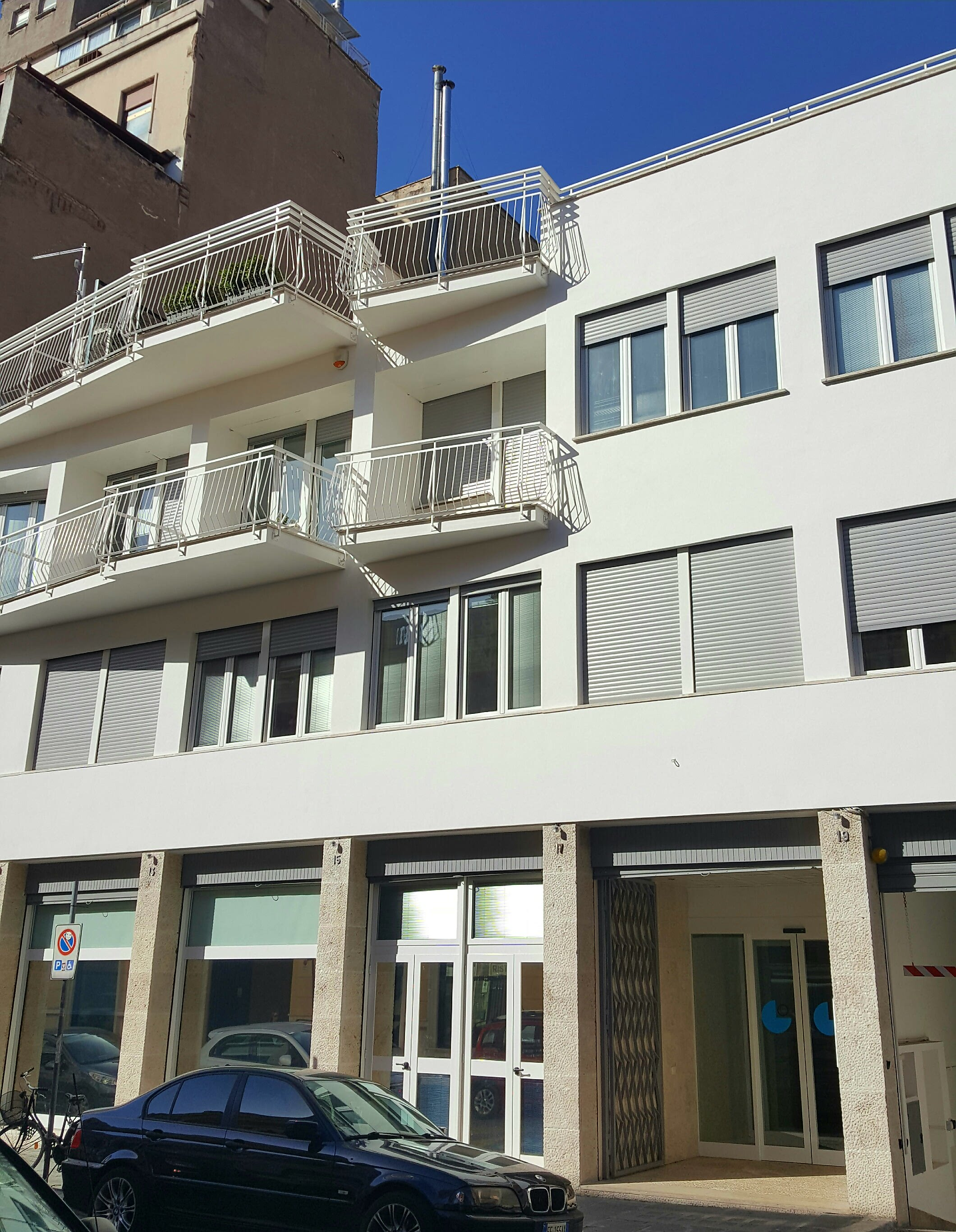
"Ordine dei Giornalisti" headquartiers in Rome

It has been said that the Italian press censored itself before the censorship commission could do it. Effectively the actions against the press were formally very few, but it has been noted that due to press hierarchical organization, the regime felt to be quite safe, controlling it by the direct naming of directors and editors through the "Ordine dei Giornalisti".

Most of the intellectuals, who after the war would have freely expressed their anti-fascism, were however journalists during fascism, and quite comfortably could find a way to work in a system in which news directly came from the government.

Newer revisionists talk about the servility of journalists, but are surprisingly followed in this concept by many other authors and by some leftist ones too, since the same suspect was always attributed to the Italian press, before, during and after the Ventennio, and still in recent times the category has not completely demonstrated yet its independence from "strong powers". A well-known Italian journalist writer, Ennio Flaiano, certainly an anti-fascist, used to say that journalists do not need to care of "that irrelevant majority of Italians".

Independent (illegal) press used clandestine print and distribution and were mainly connected with the activities of local political groups.

The control of legitimate papers was practically operated by faithful civil servants at the printing machines and this allowed reporting a common joke affirming that any text that could reach readers had been "written by the Duce and approved by the foreman".

Fascist censorship promoted papers with wider attention to mere chronology of delicate political moments, to distract public opinion from dangerous passages of the government. Press then focused on other terrifying figures (murderers, serial killers, terrorists, paedophiles, etc.). When needed, an image of a safe ordered State was instead to be stressed, then police were able to capture all the criminals and, as a famous topic says, trains were always in perfect time. All these manoeuvres were commonly directed by MinCulPop directly.

After fascism, the democratic republic did not change the essence of the fascist law on press, which is now organized as it was before, like the law on access to the profession of journalist remained unaltered.

About satire and related press, Fascism was not more severe, and in fact, a famous magazine, Marc'Aurelio, was able to operate with little trouble. In 1924–1925, during the most violent times of fascism (when squads used brutality against opposition) with reference to the death of Giacomo Matteotti killed by fascists, Marc'Aurelio published a series of heavy jokes and "comic" drawings describing dictator Benito Mussolini finally distributing peace. Marc'Aurelio however would have turned to a more integrated tone during the following years and in 1938 (the year of the racial laws) published tasteless anti-Semitic content.

=== Censorship in private communications ===
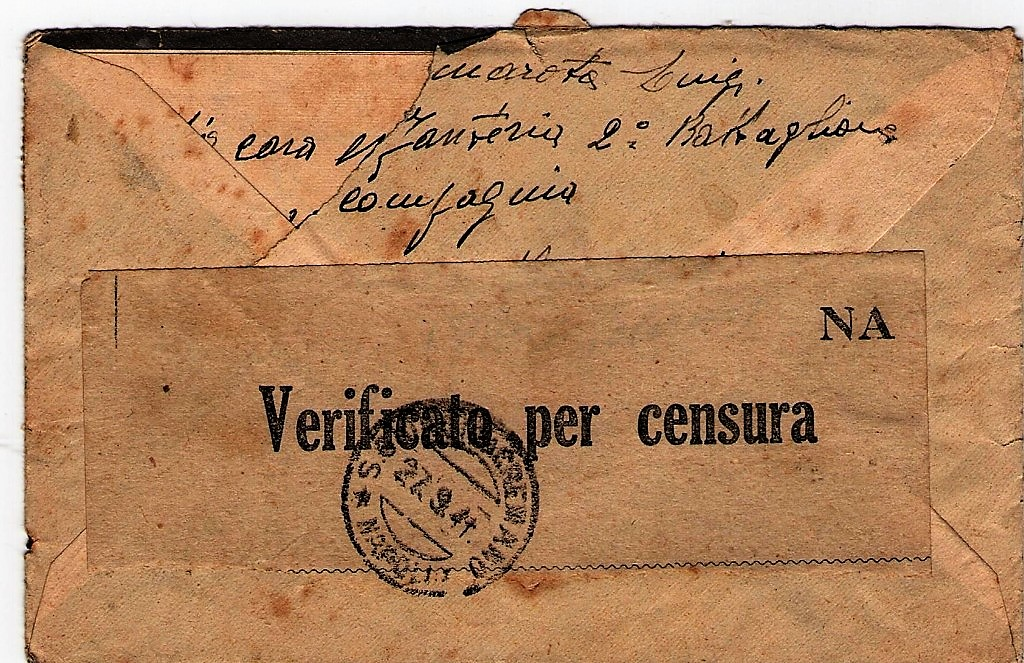
Letter sent by an Italian soldier during World War II to his girlfriend, in the province of Naples, dated 27 September 1941, verified for censorship

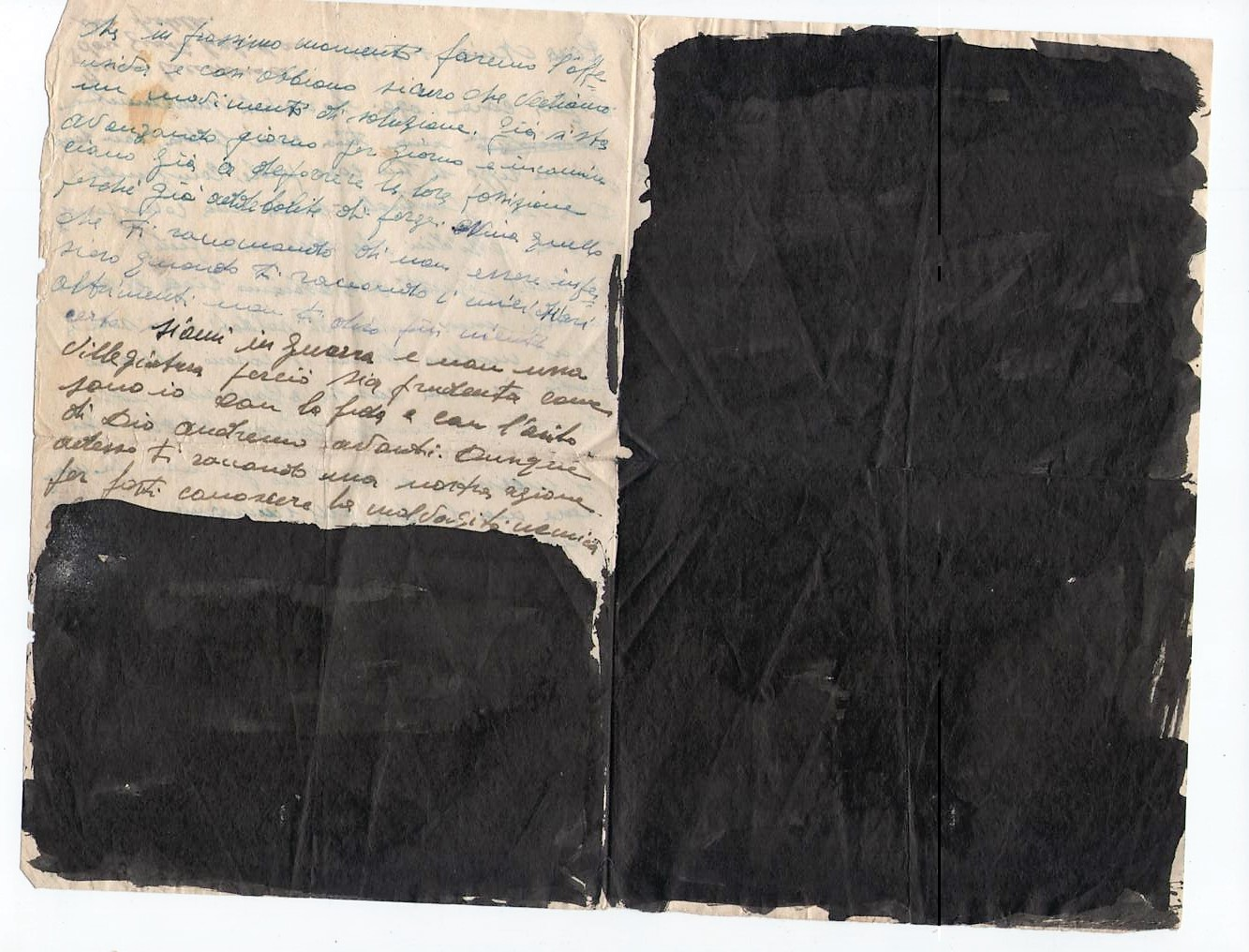
Letter dated 7 March 1941, written by an Italian soldier to his family during World War II, censored

Quite obviously, any telephone call was at risk of being intercepted and, sometimes, interrupted by censors.

Not all the letters were opened, but not all those read by censors had the regular stamp that recorded the executed control. Most of the censorship was probably not declared, to secretly consent to further police investigations.

Chattering en plein air was indeed very risky, as a special section of investigators dealt with what people were saying on the roads; an eventual accusation by some policeman in disguise was evidently very hard to disprove and many people reported having been falsely accused of anti-national sentiments, just for personal interests of the spy. Consequently, after the first cases, people commonly avoided talking publicly.

=== Military censorship ===
The greatest amount of documents about fascist censorship came from the military commissions for censorship. The military censorship commissions compiled the opinions and feelings of the soldiers at the front in a note, which was received daily by Mussolini or his apparatus.

This was due to several factors. The war had brought many Italians far from their homes, creating a need for writing to their families that previously did not exist. In a critical situation such as war, military authorities were compelled to control eventual internal oppositions, spies or defeatists. Finally, the result of the war could not allow fascists to hide or delete these documents or remain in public offices where they could be found by occupying troops.

=== Italians' reaction against censorship ===
The fact that Italians were well aware that any communication could be intercepted, recorded, analyzed and eventually used against them, caused censorship, in time, to become a sort of usual rule to consider, and soon most people used jargon or other conventional systems to overtake the rules.

In most of the small villages, life continued as before, since the local authorities used a very familiar style in executing such orders. Also in many urban realities, civil servants used little zeal and more humanity. But the general effect was indeed relevant.

In theatre, censorship caused a revival of "canovaccio" and Commedia dell'arte given that all the stories had to obtain prior permission before being performed.

== Censorship during the Italian Civil War (1943–1945) ==
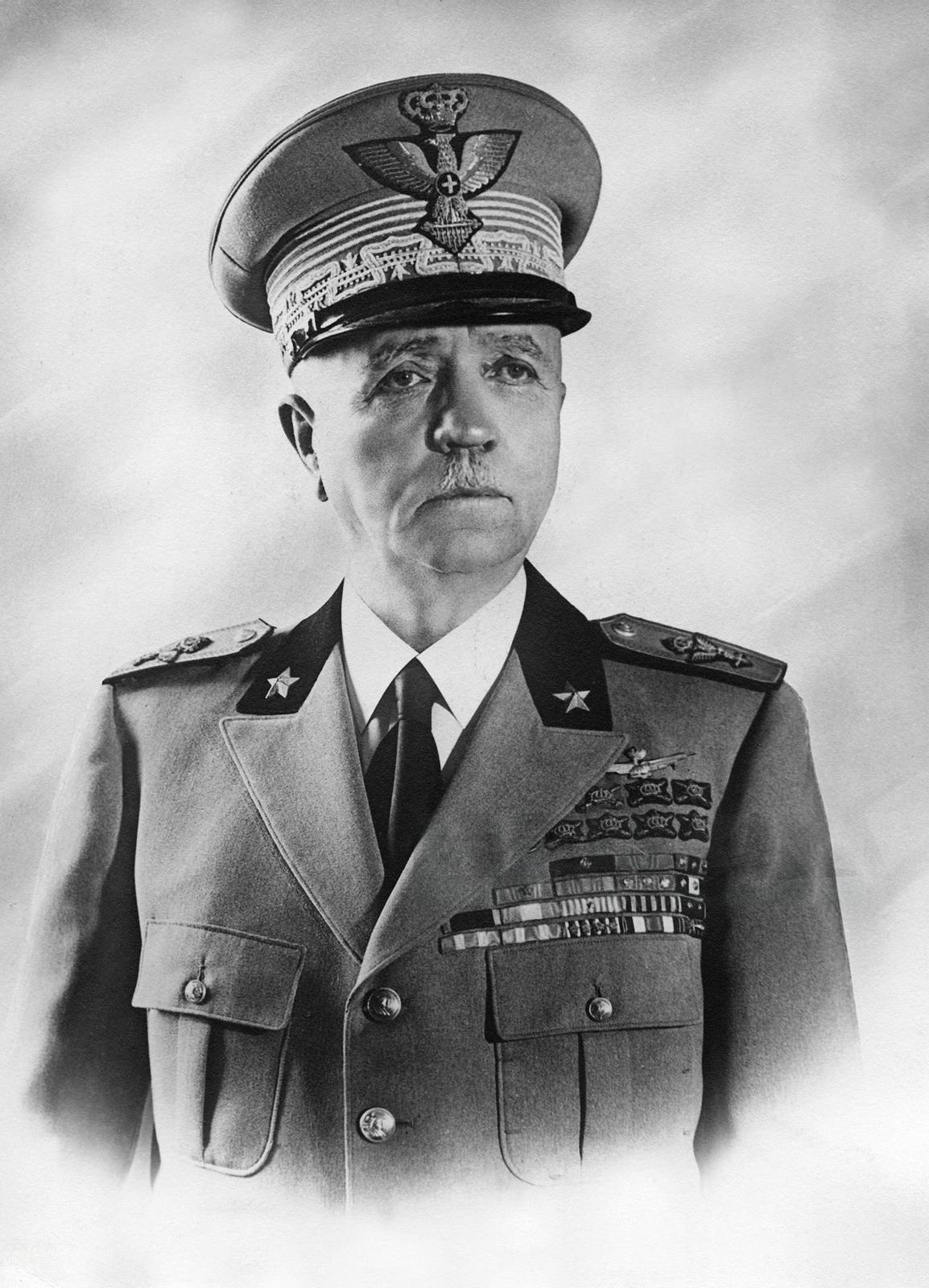
Pietro Badoglio

Fascism fell during the third year of the war, 1943. In July the Allies began the liberation of Italy by landing in Sicily. A few weeks later, on 25 July, the Mussolini regime fell, triggering the start of the Italian Civil War. The effect on Italian newspapers was immediate. All editors who were members of the National Fascist Party, or militants, were dismissed and replaced. Just 45 days later Germany invaded Italy and there was a new change. All newspapers in Northern Italy remained under Nazi-Fascist control until April 1945.

The new Prime Minister, General Pietro Badoglio, instead of suppressing the Ministry of Popular Culture, suspended its activities and used it to transmit new orders aimed at controlling the press. The decree of 9 August 1943, n. 727, dictated very restrictive rules on freedom of the press:

- Any transfer of ownership of a newspaper or periodical had to have the approval of the Ministry of Popular Culture;
- The appointment of the director responsible for newspapers or periodicals had to be authorized by the said ministry;
- News agencies that received state contributions or subsidies were required to submit accounting records upon request from the ministry itself.

The effects of the decree ceased less than a month later, with the unconditional surrender to the Allies. The Armistice of Cassibile, signed on 3 September 1943, in fact, contained rules regarding the regulation of the press:

- Control of the radio, communications and transceiver systems passed to the Allies. The media would also be under the control and subject to authorization of the Allied Command (art. 16);
- All newspapers compromised with the Italian Social Republic ceased publication: the factories would have been seized pending closure or a change of name and editorial line.
- The armistice also provided for the restoration of the most basic freedoms of thought and expression prohibited by the past regime. The Act in fact sanctioned the suppression of the spread of fascist ideology and teaching and the dissolution of its institutions and organizations, especially military, paramilitary, espionage and propaganda (art. 30).
- Likewise, all Italian laws involving discrimination based on race, colour, faith or political opinion were abolished and any impediment or prohibition resulting from them was eliminated, and the release of anyone who had been deprived of freedom or these rights due to such laws (art. 31).

Writers, journalists, playwrights and political exponents whose work had been prohibited, interdicted or forced underground by censorship and the abolition of the freedom of the press during the years of fascism resumed writing and publishing articles, books and other literary productions.

In the same period, the Allies increased the hours of Radio Londra programming that could be received in Northern Italy. In 1943 they reached the duration of 4 hours and 15 minutes. Radios were also used to send coded messages, passwords and other communications to fighters in areas still in conflict or under Nazi-Fascist occupation.

Starting in 1944, the reorganization of executive power between central and peripheral bodies began in liberated Italy. The decrees no. 13 and 14 of 14 January 1944 assigned the prefects the power to grant printing licenses and established the obligation for publishers to report stocks of paper and printing materials. With the legislative decree of 31 May 1946, n. 561, the rules of the past regime on the seizure of publications were cancelled and the pre-existing situation was returned.

== Censorship in the modern Italian Republic (1946–present) ==
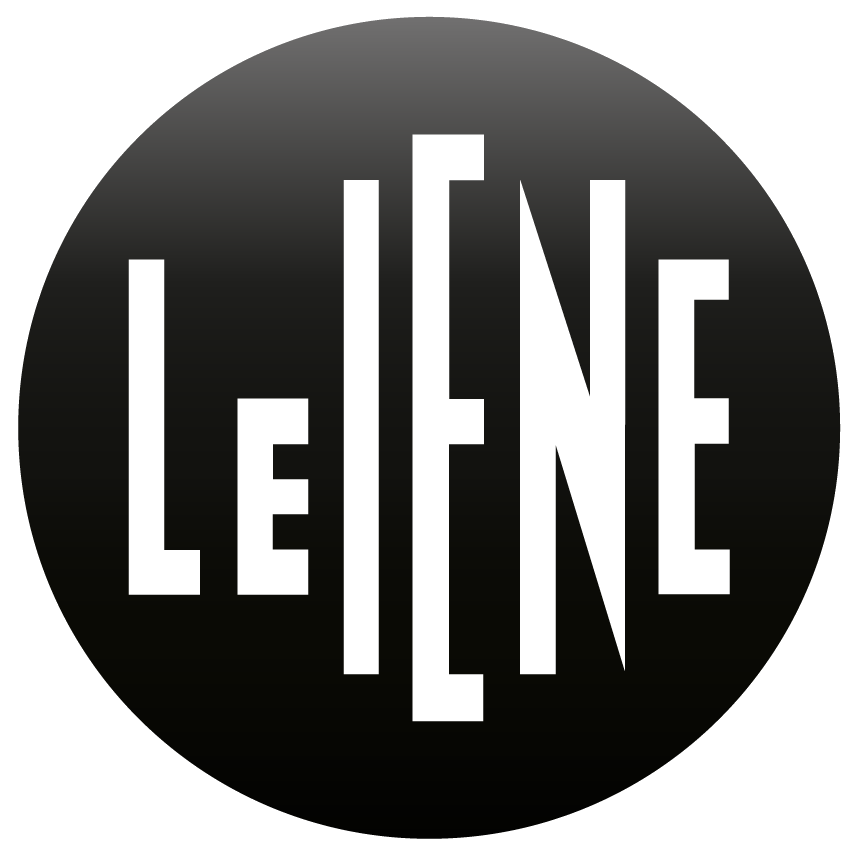
Le Iene logo

One of the most important cases of censorship in Italy was the banning of one episode of the TV show Le Iene showing use of cocaine in the Italian Parliament. As with all the other media of Italy, the Italian television industry is widely considered both inside and outside the country to be overtly politicized. According to a December 2008 poll, only 24% of Italians trust television news programmes, compared unfavourably to the British rate of 38%, making Italy one of only three examined countries where online sources are considered more reliable than television ones for information.

Italy put an embargo on foreign bookmakers over the Internet (in violation of EU market rules) by mandating certain edits to DNS host files of Italian ISPs. Italy also blocks access to websites containing child pornography.

Advertisements promoting Videocracy, a Swedish documentary examining the influence of television on Italian culture over the last 30 years, was refused airing purportedly because it says the spots are an offence to Premier Silvio Berlusconi.

Films, anime and cartoons are often modified or cut on national television networks such as Mediaset or RAI. An example of this occurred in December 2008, when Brokeback Mountain was aired on Rai 2 during primetime. Several scenes featuring mildly sexual (or even just romantic) behaviour of the two protagonists were cut. This act was severely criticized by Italian LGBT activist organizations and others.

=== Guareschi case ===
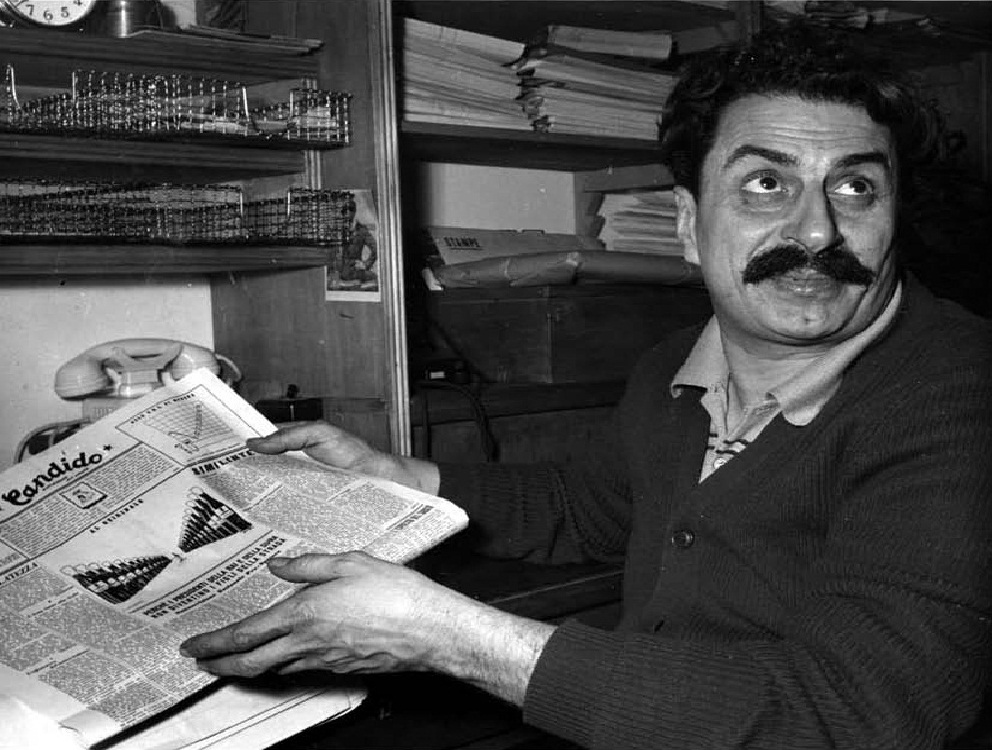
Giovannino Guareschi with the cartoon on Luigi Einaudi published in Candido

In 1950 a cartoon published in Candido (n. 25 of 18 June), drawn by Carletto Manzoni, cost Giovannino Guareschi, co-director of the weekly at the time, his first conviction for contempt of the President of Italy, Luigi Einaudi. The cartoon, entitled Al Quirinale, depicted a double row of bottles with, at the bottom, the figurine of a man with a stick, like a great officer reviewing two groups of Corazzieri ("The Corazzieri" was the caption of the cartoon). Candido had highlighted the fact that Einaudi, on the labels of the wine he produced (a Nebbiolo), allowed his public office as President of Italy to be highlighted. The bottle of wine, in fact, had "Nebbiolo, the President's wine" on the label. There were also other cartoons, besides the Al Quirinale one, such as that of the Giro d'Italia with the motto "Toast Einaudi!" or the little man who had the "bottle of Damocles" on his head. Sentenced to eight months in prison, the execution of the sentence was suspended as Guareschi had no criminal record.

=== Cinema ===
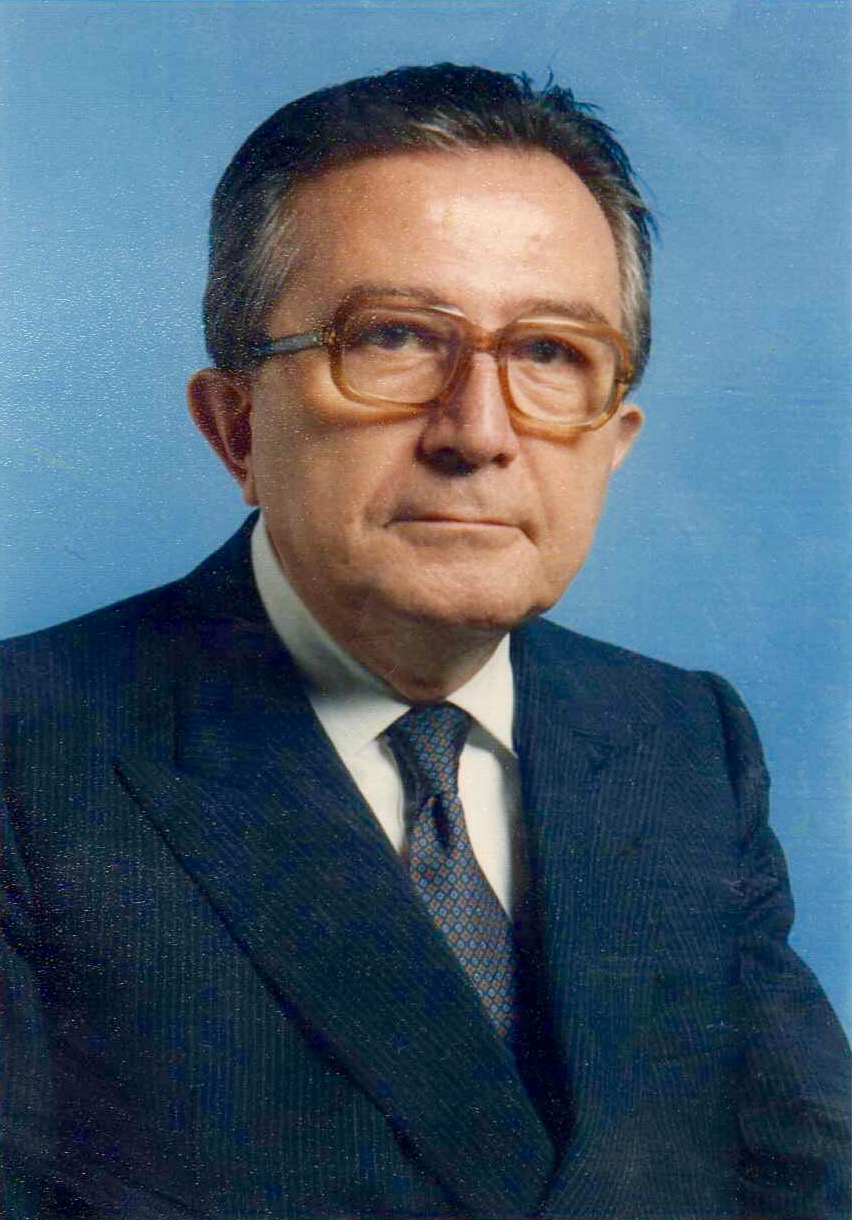
Giulio Andreotti

With the birth of the Italian Republic, as regards film censorship, no substantial changes were introduced compared to the censorship provided for by the laws approved during the fascist regime, despite Article 21 of the Constitution allowing freedom of the press and all forms of expression. Under pressure mainly from the Catholic world, the paragraph was added which establishes a ban on shows and all other demonstrations contrary to morality. A central office for cinematography was established at the Presidency of the Council, where the opinions of the first and second-degree commissions converged, essentially remaining those of 1923, even if slightly changed in their composition.

In 1949 a law was issued, presented by the then undersecretary for entertainment Giulio Andreotti, which was supposed to support and promote the growth of Italian cinema and at the same time slow down the advance of American films, but also the embarrassing "excesses" of Italian neorealism (which remained famous in this regard his statement according to which "Dirty laundry is washed in the family"). Following this rule, the screenplay had to be approved by a state commission before it could receive public funding. Furthermore, if it was believed that a film defamed Italy, the export license could be denied.

In 1962, a new law on the review of films and theatrical works was approved, which remained in force until 2021: although it brought about some changes, it confirmed the maintenance of a preventive system of censorship and made screening subject to the release of authorization. publishes films and exports them abroad. Based on this law, the opinion on the film was expressed by a specific first-level Commission (and by a second-level one for appeals), while the authorization was issued by the Ministry of Tourism and Entertainment (established in 1959).

In addition to total censorship, from the 1930s to the 1990s another form of censorship was in vogue in Italy, that of targeted cuts. In practice, it was customary to cut the parts of the film that were not wanted to be shown, while still allowing the manipulated film to be shown. On 5 April 2021, the total abolition of film censorship in Italy was announced.

=== Music ===
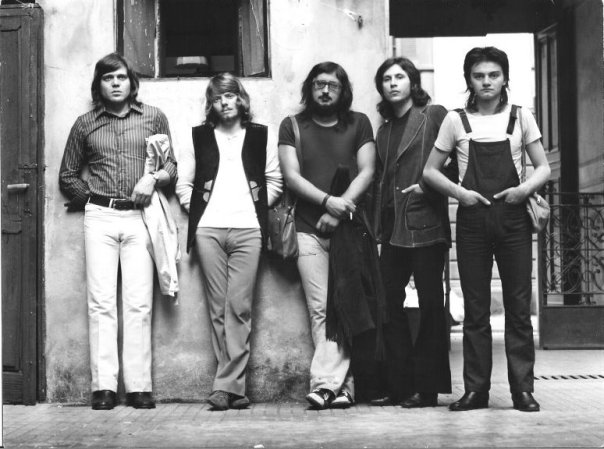
Nomadi in 1972

Immediately after the end of World War II, with the rise to power of the Christian Democracy, censorship of music targeted references that could cause disturbance. Thus religion is the object of censorship, a particularly sensational case of Dio è morto ("God is dead") sung by Nomadi, which is censored by RAI but regularly broadcast by Vatican Radio.

Another sensitive topic is sex, the object of particularly ferocious censorship, as happens for example in the case of Je t'aime... moi non-plus, sung by Serge Gainsbourg and Jane Birkin in 1969, a record which was seized and its sale permanently prohibited. The Catholic "censorship" began to loosen in the second half of the 1970s, however, numerous censorships continued to be practised in the following decades.

=== The "Report" case ===
In 2009, the board of state television RAI cut funds for legal assistance to the investigative journalism TV programme Report (aired by Rai 3, a state-owned channel). The program had tackled sensitive issues in the past that exposed the journalists to legal action (for example the authorization of buildings that did not meet earthquake-resistance specifications, cases of overwhelming bureaucracy, the slow process of justice, prostitution, health care scandals, bankrupt bankers secretly owning multimillion-dollar paintings, waste mismanagement involving dioxin toxic waste, cancers caused by asbestos anti-fire shielding (Eternit) and environmental pollution caused by a coal power station near the city of Taranto). An accumulation of lawsuits against the journalists in the absence of the funds to handle them could bring the program to an end.

=== "Freedom of the Press" report ===
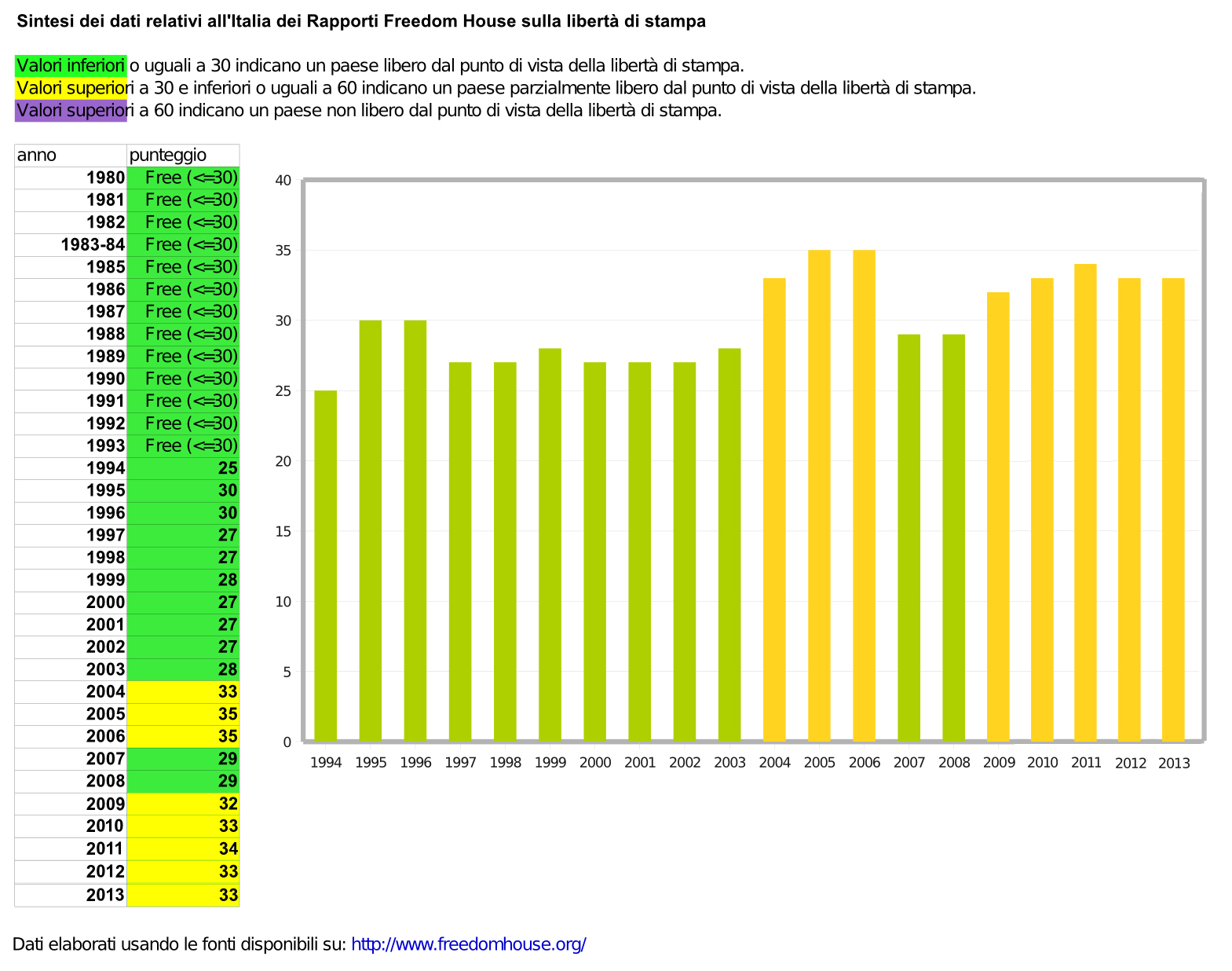
Freedom House report (summary)

Before 2004, in the "Freedom of the Press" report, published by the American organization Freedom House, Italy had always been classified as "Free" (regarding the freedom of the press). In 2004, it was demoted to "Partly Free", due to "20 years of failed political administration", the "controversial Gasparri's Law of 2003" and the "possibility for prime minister to influence the RAI (Italian state-owned Radio-Television), a conflict of interests among the most blatant in the World".

Italy's status was upgraded to "free" in 2007 and 2008 under the Prodi II Cabinet, to come back as "partly free" in 2009 with the Berlusconi IV Cabinet. Freedom House noted that Italy constitutes "a regional outlier" and particularly quoted the "increased government attempts to interfere with editorial policy at state-run broadcast outlets, particularly regarding coverage of scandals surrounding prime minister Silvio Berlusconi." In their 2011 report, Freedom House continued to list Italy as "partly free" and ranked the country 24th out of 25 in the Western European region, ahead of Turkey. In 2020 Italy was listed again in The Freedom House report as Free.

=== Anti-defamation actions ===
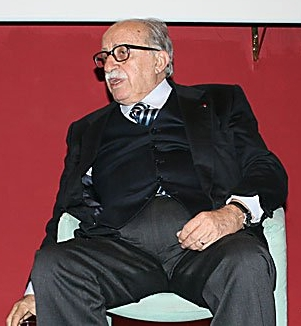
Lino Jannuzzi

Defamation is a crime in Italy with the possibility of large fines and/or prison terms. Thus anti-defamation actions may intimidate reporters and encourage self-censorship.

In February 2004, the journalist Massimiliano Melilli was sentenced to 18 months in prison and a €100,000 fine for two articles, published on 9 and 16 November 1996, that reported rumours of "erotic parties" supposedly attended by members of Trieste high society.

In July, magistrates in Naples placed Lino Jannuzzi, a 76-year-old journalist and senator, under house arrest, although they allowed him the possibility of attending the work of the parliament during daytime. In 2002, he was arrested, found guilty of "defamation through the press" ("diffamazione a mezzo stampa"), and sentenced to 29 months' imprisonment because of articles that appeared in a local paper for which he was editor-in-chief. The articles revealed the irresponsible operation of the judiciary and highlighted what Jannuzzi called wrong and unjust sentences. Therefore, it was widely perceived that his sentence was given as revenge by the judiciary. Following heavy criticism from home and abroad, in February 2005, Italian President Ciampi pardoned Jannuzzi.

=== Mediaset and Berlusconi ===
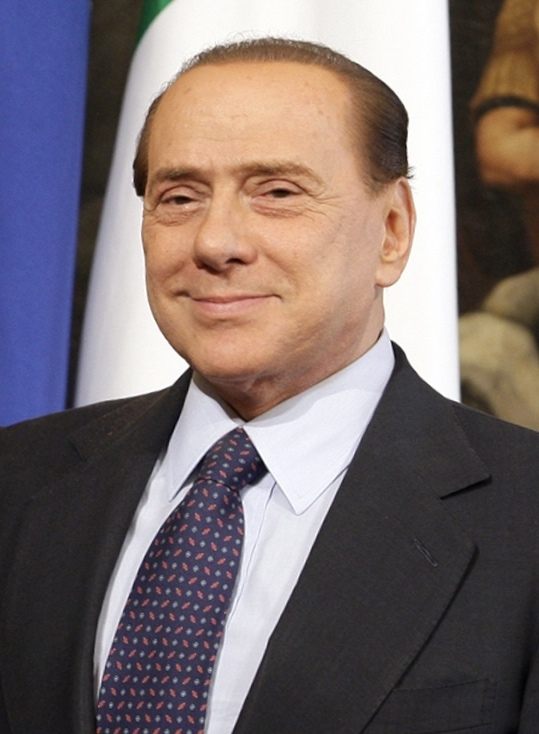
Silvio Berlusconi

Silvio Berlusconi's extensive control over the media was widely criticised by both analysts and press freedom organisations, who alleged that Italy's media had limited freedom of expression. The Freedom of the Press 2004 Global Survey, an annual study issued by the American organization Freedom House, downgraded Italy's ranking from 'Free' to 'Partly Free' due to Berlusconi's influence over RAI; among Western European countries in 2005, this ranking was shared only with Turkey. Reporters Without Borders stated that in 2004, "The conflict of interests involving prime minister Silvio Berlusconi and his vast media empire was still not resolved and continued to threaten news diversity". In April 2004, the International Federation of Journalists joined the criticism, objecting to the passage of a law vetoed by Carlo Azeglio Ciampi in 2003, which critics believed was designed to protect Berlusconi's reported 90% control of the Italian television system.

=== "Editto Bulgaro" ===
Berlusconi's influence over RAI became evident when in Sofia, Bulgaria he expressed his views on journalists Enzo Biagi and Michele Santoro and comedian Daniele Luttazzi. Berlusconi said that they "use television as a criminal means of communication". They lost their jobs as a result. This statement was called by critics "Editto Bulgaro".

The TV broadcasting of a satirical program called RAIot – Armi di distrazione di massa (Raiot-Weapons of mass distraction, where "Raiot" is a mangling of RAI which sounds like the English riot) was censored in November 2003 after the comedian Sabina Guzzanti (daughter of Paolo Guzzanti, former senator of Forza Italia) made outspoken criticism of the Berlusconi media empire.

=== Par condicio ===
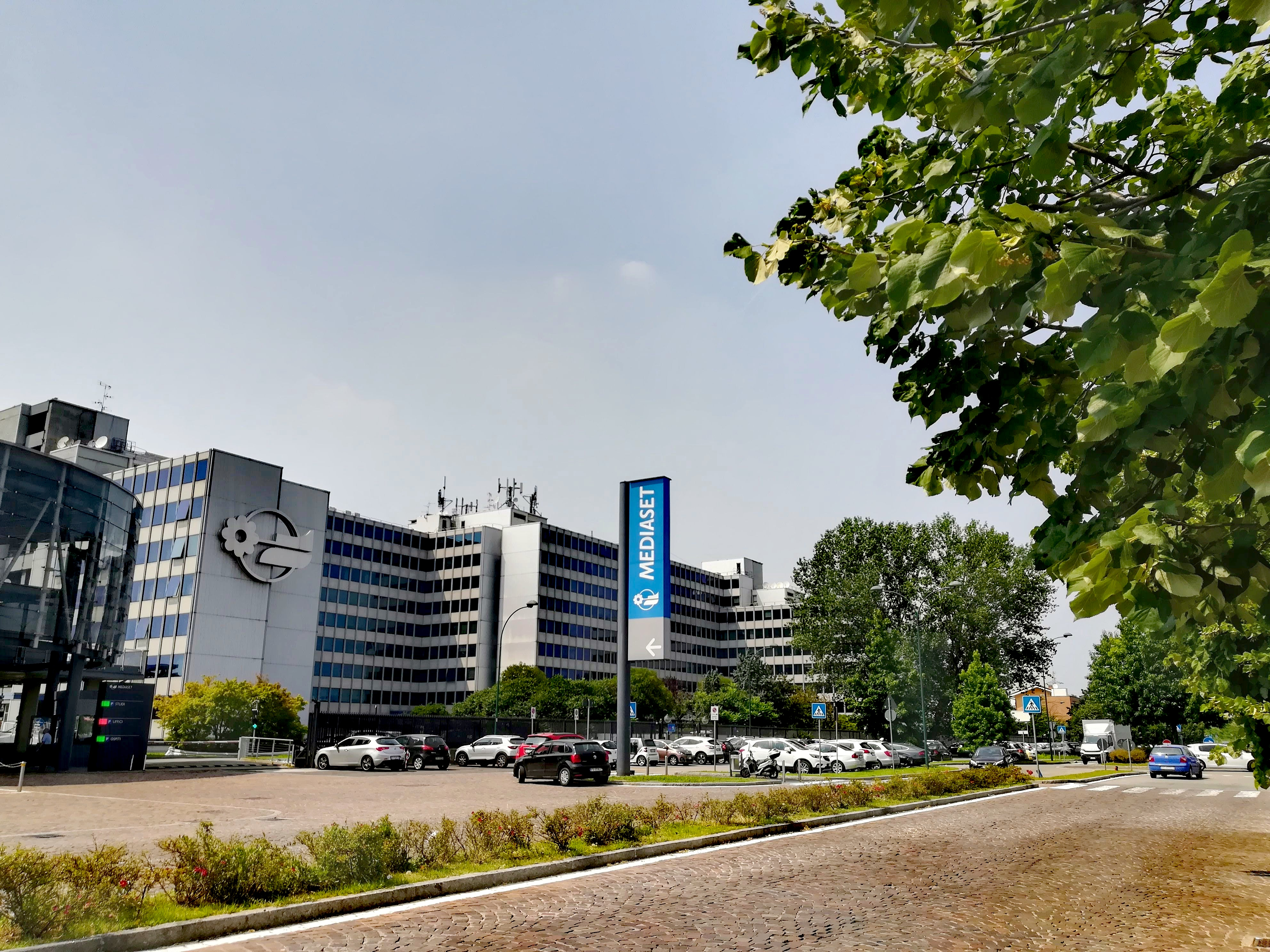
Mediaset headquarters in Cologno Monzese

Mediaset, Berlusconi's television group, has stated that it uses the same criteria as the public (state-owned) television RAI in assigning proper visibility to all the most important political parties and movements (the so-called par condicio, Latin for 'equal treatment' or 'Fairness Doctrine')—which has been since often disproved.

On 24 June 2009, during the Confindustria young members congress in Santa Margherita Ligure, Italy, Silvio Berlusconi invited advertisers to interrupt or boycott advertising contracts with the magazines and newspapers published by Gruppo Editoriale L'Espresso, in particular the newspaper la Repubblica and the news-magazine L'espresso, calling the publishing group "shameless" for fueling the economic crisis by bringing attention to it. He also accused them of making a "subversive attack" against him. The publishing group announced possible legal proceedings against Berlusconi to protect the image and the interests of the group.

In October 2009, Reporters Without Borders Secretary-General Jean-François Julliard declared that Berlusconi "is on the verge of being added to our list of Predators of Press Freedom", which would be a first for a European leader. In the event, Berlusconi was not declared a Predator of Press Freedom, but RWB continued to warn of "the continuing concentration of media ownership, displays of contempt and impatience on the part of government officials towards journalists and their work" in Italy. Julliard added that Italy will probably be ranked last in the European Union in the upcoming edition of the RWB press freedom index. Italy was in fact ranked last in the EU in RWB's "Press Freedom Index 2010".

=== Internet censorship ===
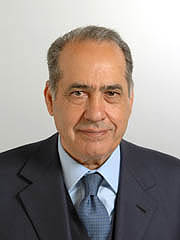
Giuseppe Pisanu

Italy is listed as engaged in selective Internet filtering in the social area and no evidence of filtering was found in the political, conflict/security, and Internet tools areas by the OpenNet Initiative in December 2010. Access to almost 7,000 websites is filtered in the country.

Filtering in Italy is applied against child pornography, gambling, and some P2P web sites. Starting in February 2009, The Pirate Bay website and IP address are unreachable from Italy, blocked directly by Internet service providers. A controversial verdict issued by the Court of Bergamo, and later confirmed by the Supreme Court, allowed the blocking, stating that it was useful to prevent copyright infringement. Pervasive filtering is applied to gambling websites that do not have a local license to operate in Italy.

Several legal tools are in development to monitor and censor Internet access and content. Examples include the Romani law, a special law proposed by parliament after Facebook cases of a group against Prime Minister Berlusconi.

An anti-terrorism law, amended in 2005, by then-Minister of the Interior Giuseppe Pisanu, after the terrorist attacks in Madrid and London, used to restrict the opening of new Wi-Fi hotspots. Interested entities were required to first apply for permission to open the hotspot at the local police headquarters. The law required potential hotspot and Internet café users to present an identity document. This has inhibited the opening of hotspots across Italy, with the number of hotspots five times lower than France and led to an absence of municipal wireless networks. In 2009, only 32% of Italian Internet users had Wi-Fi access. After some unsuccessful proposals to facilitate the opening of and access to Wi-Fi hotspots, the original 2005 law was repealed in 2011. In 2013, a new text was approved clarifying that operators are not required to identify users, nor to log the traffic.

Access to the white nationalist forum Stormfront has also been blocked from Italy since 2012.

== List of censored films ==
=== From the Unification of Italy to the fascist regime (1861–1922) ===
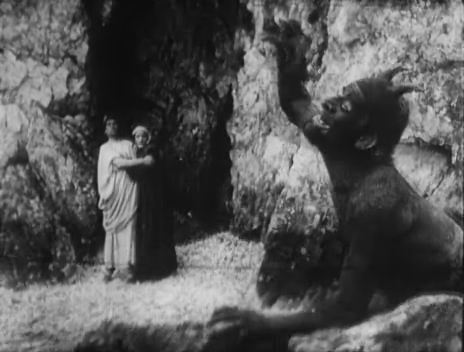
A scene from the film L'Inferno (1911)

- L'Inferno (1911) by Francesco Bertolini, Adolfo Padovan and Giuseppe De Liguoro, managed to obtain a visa after cutting the final scene.
- Floretta and Patapon by Mario Caserini (1913), managed to obtain a visa after cutting two scenes.

=== From the fascist regime to the Italian Republic (1922–1946) ===
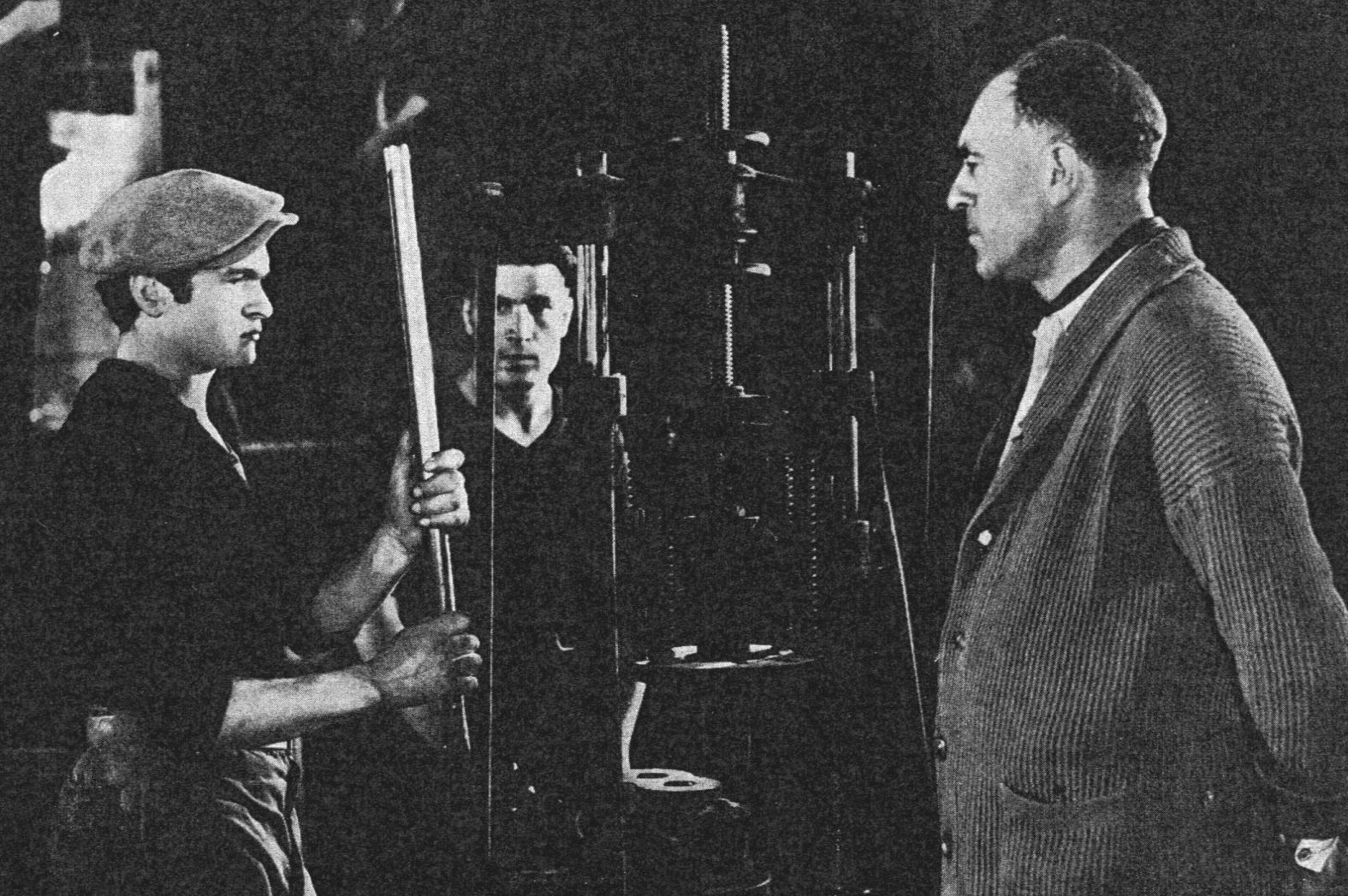
A scene from the film Ragazzo (1933)

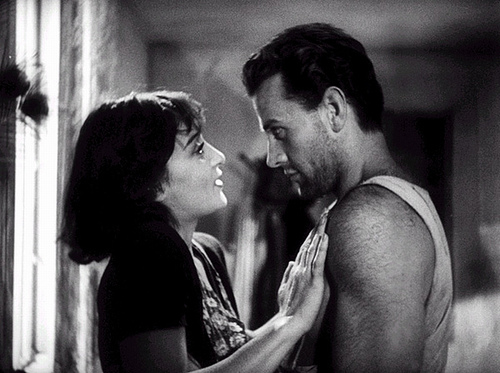
A scene from the film Ossessione (1943)

During fascism the following films were prohibited or cut:

- Westfront 1918 (1930) by Georg Wilhelm Pabst, released only in 1962.
- All Quiet on the Western (1930) by Lewis Milestone, released only in 1956.
- Street Scene (1931) by King Vidor.
- Mountains on Fire (1931) by Luis Trenker, released only in 1951.
- The Public Enemy (1931) by William A. Wellman.
- Little Caesar (1931) by Mervyn LeRoy.
- Freaks (1932) by Tod Browning.
- A Farewell to Arms (1932) by Frank Borzage, released only in 1956.
- Rasputin and the Empress (1932) by Richard Boleslawski, released only in 1960.
- Scarface (1932) by Howard Hawks, released only in 1947 with a ban on children under 16.
- Ragazzo (1933) by Ivo Perilli.
- The Lives of a Bengal Lance (1935) by Henry Hathaway.
- The Three-Cornered Hat (1935) by Mario Camerini.
- The 39 Steps (1935) by Alfred Hitchcock.
- The Green Pastures (1936) by William Keighley.
- The Charge of the Light Brigade (1936) by Michael Curtiz.
- The Lower Depths (1936), La Grande Illusion (1937) and La Bête Humaine (1938) by Jean Renoir.
- Dead End (1937) by William Wyler, released only in 1948.
- The Life of Emile Zola (1937) by William Dieterle, released in 1946.
- Port of Shadows (1938) by Marcel Carné.
- The Adventures of Marco Polo (1938) by Archie Mayo, was released in 1939 under the name A Scotsman in the Court of the Great Khan.
- Orage (1938) by Marc Allégret.
- The Baker's Wife (1938) by Marcel Pagnol.
- The End of the Day (1938) by Julien Duvivier.
- The Shanghai Drama (1938) by Georg Wilhelm Pabst.
- Idiot's Delight (1939) by Clarence Brown.
- The Great Dictator (1940) by Charlie Chaplin, blocked by the Italian fascist regime until 1943 (in southern Italy) and 1945 (in northern Italy).
- Ossessione (1943) by Luchino Visconti, distributed in some theatres, but shortly afterwards it was banned and all copies found by the fascist authorities were destroyed. The copies distributed starting from 1945 were derived from a copy of the negative saved by Luchino Visconti.
- All communist, socialist or Russian-made films were forbidden.

=== Italian Republic (1946–present) ===
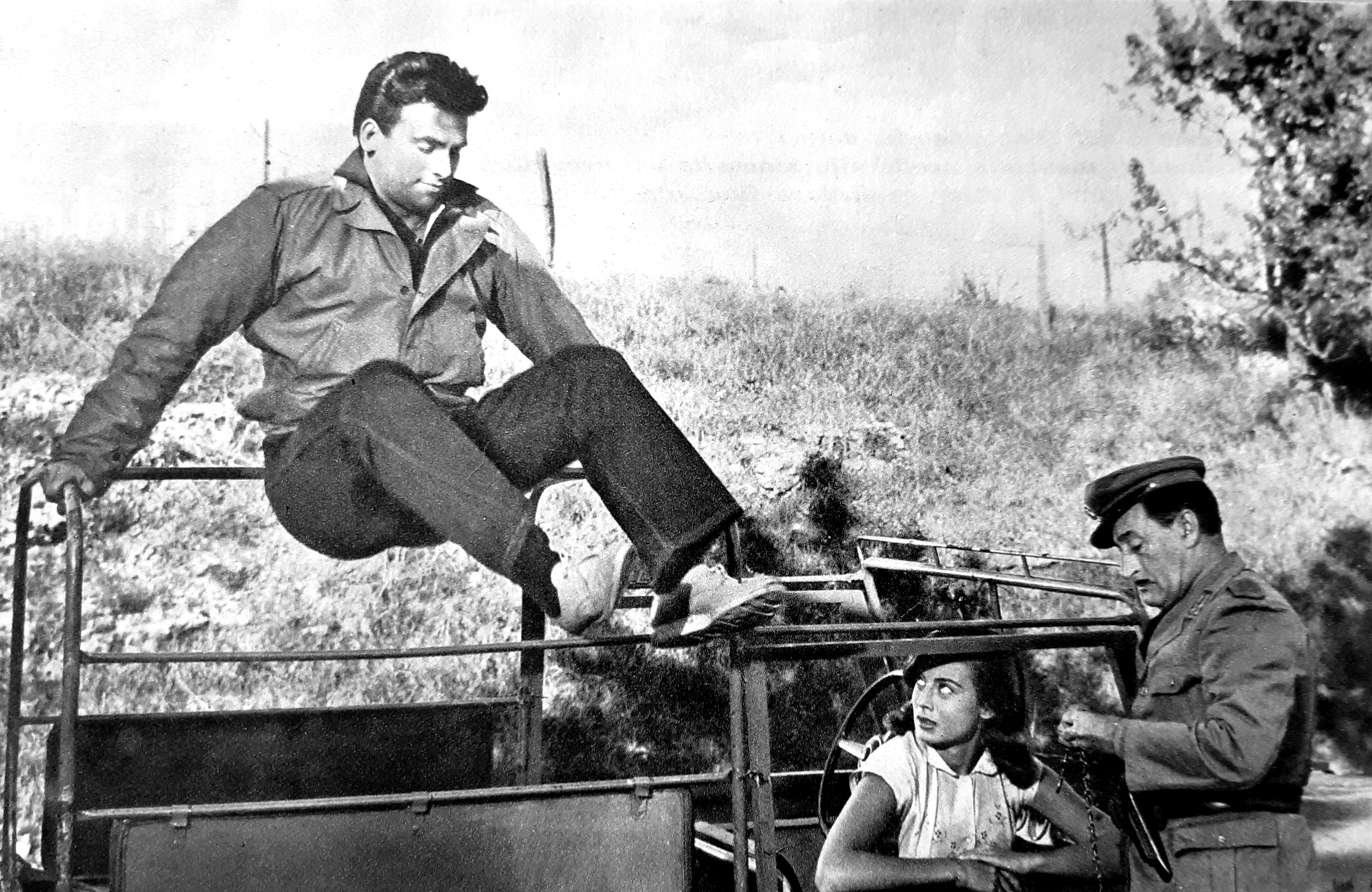
A scene from the film Toto and Carolina (1955)

- Rope (1948) by Alfred Hitchcock, blocked by censors in 1949 and released only in 1956.
- Toto and Carolina (1955) by Mario Monicelli, blocked by censors in February 1954, was distributed in 1955 only after numerous cuts.
- Different from You and Me (1957) by Veit Harlan, blocked by censors three times and released only in 1962 with the new definitive title of Trial Behind Closed Doors.
- The Howl (1968) by Tinto Brass was blocked by censors from 1969 until 1974.
- Deep Throat (1972 pornographic film) by Gerard Damiano, was blocked by censors for three years in 1972; It was released in 1975 with the title The Real Deep Throat.
- Last Tango in Paris (1972) by Bernardo Bertolucci, blocked by censorship until 1987.
- Salò, or the 120 Days of Sodom (1976) by Pier Paolo Pasolini, rejected in the first instance by the commission and forbidden to minors under 18 in the second instance, was then seized by the judiciary. The film was only broadcast on TV for the first time in 2005 (on Pay television).
- Sesso nero (1978) by Joe D'Amato, blocked by censors from 1978 until 1980.
- Cannibal Holocaust (1980) by Ruggero Deodato, blocked by censors from 1980 to 1984 and then heavily cut, to be published in full version in the DVD edition.
- Lion of the Desert (1980) by Moustapha Akkad, blocked by Italian Prime Minister Giulio Andreotti in 1982, finally broadcast in 2009 by the pay television SKY.
- Totò che visse due volte (1998) by Ciprì & Maresco; the film, on the eve of its theatrical release, was declared "off-limits" by the Film Review Commission, which thus attempted to prevent its theatrical release. Failing to do so, he invoked the complaint for contempt of religion and attempted fraud; after the appeal process, the directors and the production were acquitted by the Rome court and the film was released anyway.
- Morituris (2011) by Raffaele Picchio, did not obtain approval for censorship at first instance. Instead of appealing, the producers released it directly to home video.

== See also ==
- Censorship
- Freedom of the press
- Reporters Without Borders
- Movimento Italiano Genitori
