= MicroMega =

- Editor: Paolo Flores d'Arcais
- Categories: Newsmagazine
- Frequency: Bimonthly
- Founded: 1986; 40 years ago
- Company: GEDI Gruppo Editoriale (1986-2021); MicroMega Edizioni Impresa Sociale SRL (2021-currently)
- Country: Italy
- Based in: Rome
- Language: Italian
- Website: Official website

MicroMega is a political, cultural, social and economic newsmagazine published bimonthly in Rome, Italy. The title MicroMega is probably inspired by a tale by Voltaire.

== History and profile ==
MicroMega was founded in March 1986 by the editors Giorgio Ruffolo and Paolo Flores d'Arcais. The magazine is published by the GEDI Gruppo Editoriale and is based in Rome. Its editor is Paolo Flores d'Arcais.

During the first years, the magazine had a subtitle "Le ragioni della sinistra" ("The Reasons of the Left"). Later this subtitle was removed. Each number has now a different title, inspired by a discussion theme.

Given its format, which includes long essays and articles, the journal tends to cater to an intellectual elite. Journalist Marco Travaglio is one of its better known contributors. Many philosophers, social scientists and men and women of science and other leading figures have written on this paper, including Massimo Cacciari, Joseph Ratzinger, Bruno Forte, Michele Santoro, Gianni Vattimo, Leszek Kołakowski, Marcel Gauchet, Margherita Hack and Walter Veltroni.

The magazine was issued monthly from 20 February to 20 April 2006, then weekly (over an eight-week period) during the 2006 Italian political campaign. In this time, it was issued with the title La primavera di MicroMega. In 2007, the magazine returned to the original bimonthly format.

MicroMega has an average circulation of 25,000-30,000 copies. In 2006, some issues sold more than 100,000 copies.

On 8 July 2008, MicroMega organised a rally against Silvio Berlusconi's attempt to limit the power of the judiciary by getting parliament to pass a law that granted individuals occupying the four highest offices of the land (the President of the Republic, the Prime Minister, the President of the Chamber of Deputies and the President of the Senate) retroactive immunity from prosecution during their mandate. As prime minister, Berlusconi would thus be protected from prosecution until he left office. Roughly 100,000 people gathered in Rome's Piazza Navona to express their indignation at the new law. In 2009, that law was judged unconstitutional and repealed by the Constitutional Court.

On 13 December 2020, GEDI Gruppo Editoriale announced that the magazine would cease it publications with the start of the new year. However, Paolo Flores d'Arcais later announced that he had bought the paper, which resumed publications March 2021 under the new "MicroMega Edizioni Impresa Sociale srl".

== See also ==
- List of magazines published in Italy
- Marco Travaglio
