= Luttazzi =

Luttazzi is an Italian surname. Notable people with the surname include:

- Daniele Luttazzi (born 1961), Italian actor, illustrator, satirist, singer, and writer
- Lelio Luttazzi (1923–2010), Italian actor, composer, conductor, musician, and radio and television presenter
