= Elvira Mancuso =

Italian writer

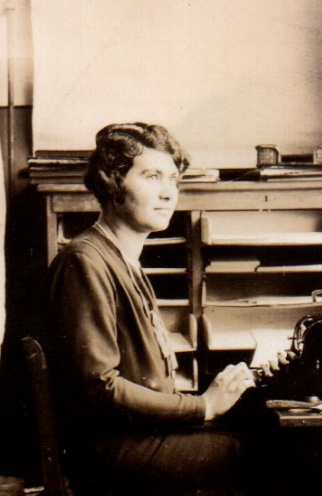
- Born: 1867; Pietraperzia, Italy
- Died: 1958 (aged 90–91); Pietraperzia, Italy
- Occupations: Writer, schoolteacher
- Years active: 1890-1910

Elvira Mancuso (1867–1958) was an Italian writer. She is most well known for her 1906 book Annuzza la maestrina, a semi-autobiographical work depicting the life of women in Sicily. This work, and other writings of Mancuso, have caused some to consider her ante-litteram feminist.

== Biography ==
Elvira was born in Italy in 1867. She was born into a wealthy family; her father was a noted criminal defense lawyer. Elvira began studying literature as part of her traditional, upper-class education; one of her major inspirations was realist writer Giovanni Verga. Between 1890 and 1891 Elvira wrote several articles for the Florence-base magazine Cornelia under two pseudonyms, Lucia Vermanos and Ruggero Torres. Elveria produced her most famous - and only - novel, Annuzza la maestrina, in 1906, also under a pen name. The semi-autobiographical novel concerned the lives of married women in Sicilian society at the turn of the 20th century. The work was deeply critical of the gender inequality present within Sicilian culture, especially when pertaining to the stigmas surrounding women who chose a career (the protagonist of the novel, much like Mancuso herself, decides to forgo a traditional marriage and become a teacher) over marriage and motherhood. Upon its release, the article was well-received, though it would remain relatively obscure until the late 20th century.

Mancuso continued to write after Annuzza, producing several essays related to gender inequality in Italian society. Much of this later criticism was also personally inflected, as it concerned the forced domesticity and rigid lifestyle upper class Sicilian woman were coerced to practice. Elvira also advocated for girls education, though she also lambasted girls primary schools as being only used to train young women for the life Italian society expected them to live.

Following the rise of Fascism and the accompanying censorship in Italy, Elvira pursued a career as a schoolteacher. She died in 1958.

=== Legacy ===
Much of Mancuso's work, though well-received by coeval critics, was not widely read. In the 1980s, her work accrued additional interest after several prominent Italian authors praised her work. Notably, Sicilian playwright and politician Leonardo Sciascia wrote in a preface to the 1981 reprint of Annuzza la maestrina that "There are many truths in this book that do not age".
