= Paolo Flores d'Arcais =

Italian philosopher (born 1944)

- Born: Paolo Flores d'Arcais; 11 July 1944 (age 81); Cervignano del Friuli, Udine, Italy

Paolo Flores d'Arcais (Italian pronunciation: [ˈpaːolo ˈflɔːrez darˈkais]; born in Cervignano del Friuli, on 11 July 1944) is an Italian philosopher and journalist, editor of the magazine MicroMega. He contributes to Il Fatto Quotidiano, El País, Frankfurter Allgemeine Zeitung and Gazeta Wyborcza.

Philosophers who have influenced his work include Albert Camus and Hannah Arendt. He was one of the main promoters of the Italian girotondi movement in 2002.

== Bibliography ==
=== Opere di Paolo Flores d'Arcais ===
- Esistenza e libertà : a partire da Hannah Arendt. Genova, Marietti, 1990. ISBN 88-211-6622-8
- Etica senza fede. Torino, Einaudi, 1992. ISBN 88-06-13001-3
- L' individuo libertario: percorsi di filosofia morale e politica nell'orizzonte del finito. Torino, Einaudi, 1999. ISBN 88-06-15139-8
- Il sovrano e il dissidente (Garzanti, 2004)
- Il ventennio populista. Da Craxi a Berlusconi (passando per D'Alema?). Fazi, 2006. ISBN 88-8112-750-4
- Hannah Arendt. Esistenza e libertà, autenticità e politica (Fazi, 2006)
