= Elio Veltri =

Italian journalist and politician (born 1938)

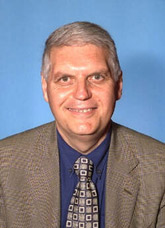
Veltri in the 1990s

Cornelio "Elio" Veltri (born 8 May 1938) is an Italian journalist and politician. He has been an author of several books and reports about illegality in the Italian economical and political world.

== Biography ==
Veltri was born at Longobardi, Calabria, and graduated in medicine at the University of Pavia. Later, he taught hemopathology in the same institute. In 1973–1980, he was mayor of Pavia as member of the Italian Socialist Party (Partito Socialista Italiano, PSI), becoming the first mayor in Europe to forbid the historical center of his city to cars. In 1981, in polemics with the PSI's then secretary Bettino Craxi about the growing bribery involvement of its members, he was expelled together with Franco Bassanini, Tristano Codignola, and others. In 1985, he was elected in the Lombardy regional council for the Proletarian Democracy (Democrazia Proletaria) party. In the period of the large bribing scandal Tangentopoli, also known as Mani pulite ("Clean Hands"), he published the essays Milano degli scandali (Milan of the Scandals, 1991) and Da Craxi a Craxi (From Craxi to Craxi, 1992).

In the 1996 Italian general election, Veltri was elected to the country's Chamber of Deputies for The Olive Tree (L'Ulivo) coalition and the Democratic Party of the Left (Partito Democratico della Sinistra); he became a member of the parliamentary commissions dealing with mafia and corruption. The following year, Veltri founded the Democracy and Legality (Democrazia e Legalità) association, which has published an online journal since 2001. In 1998, he was one of the founders of the Italy of Values (Italia dei Valori) party. In 2001, he also published L'odore dei soldi (The Money Smell), a report about bribery in Italy written with Marco Travaglio, another investigative journalist. That same year, he founded Civil Opposition (Opposizione Civile), which later merged in Building for the Common Good (Cantiere per il Bene Comune). In June 2007, together with journalist Oliviero Beha, Veltri founded the Civic List of Citizens for the Republic (Lista Civica dei Cittadini per la Repubblica), also called the National Civic List (Lista Civica Nazionale), in reference to independent politicians and civic lists in Italy.
