= Enzo Biagi =

Italian journalist and writer (1920–2007)

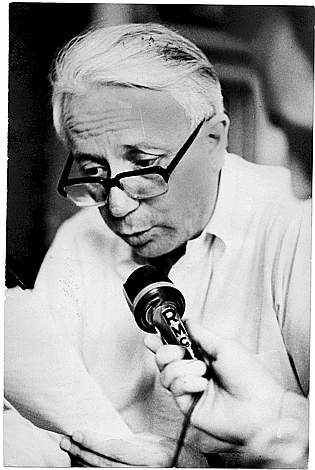
- Biagi in 1976
- Born: 9 August 1920; Lizzano in Belvedere, Kingdom of Italy
- Died: 6 November 2007 (aged 87); Milan, Italy
- Occupations: Journalist; writer; television presenter
- Years active: 1937–2007
- Height: 1.70 m (5 ft 7 in)
- Political party: Action Party (1943–1947)

Enzo Biagi (Italian pronunciation: [ˈɛntso ˈbjaːdʒi]; 9 August 1920 – 6 November 2007) was an Italian journalist, writer and former partisan.

== Life and career ==
Biagi was born in Lizzano in Belvedere, and began his career as a journalist in Bologna. In 1952, he worked on the screenplay of the historical film Red Shirts. In 1953, he became the editor-in-chief of Epoca magazine.

Active in journalism for six decades and author of some eighty books, Biagi won numerous awards, among which were the 1979 Saint Vincent prize and the 1985 Ischia International Journalism Award. In 1987, he won the Premio Bancarella for his book Il boss è solo, interviewing former Sicilian Mafia boss Tommaso Buscetta, who had turned pentito (state witness). He worked on the Italian national TV channel Rai 1 until 2001.

On 9 May 2001, just two days before the general elections in Italy, during his daily prime time 10-minute TV show Il Fatto, broadcast on Rai Uno, Biagi interviewed the popular actor and director Roberto Benigni, who gave a hilarious talk about Silvio Berlusconi declaring his preference for the other candidate, Francesco Rutelli from the Olive Tree coalition.

=== Bulgarian Edict ===
Biagi disappeared from TV screens a few months after Berlusconi's declarations in Sofia named also editto bulgaro, where the then-Prime Minister accused the popular journalist, together with fellow journalist Michele Santoro and showman/comedian Daniele Luttazzi, of having made criminal use of the public television service.

Biagi's defenders argue that a public service should provide pluralism, and that a country where government prevents opposing ideas from being voiced on air is a regime.

The issue of Berlusconi's motives for entering politics in the first place emerged in an interview that he gave with Biagi and Indro Montanelli, stating "If I don't enter politics, I will go to jail and become bankrupt".

=== Biagi's return on TV and death ===
On 22 April 2007, 86-year-old Enzo Biagi made his TV comeback on the RAI with RT - Rotocalco Televisivo, a current affairs show which is broadcast on Rai 3. At the opening of the show, he declared:

Good evening, sorry if I am a bit emotional, maybe it is visible. There has been a technical problem, and the break has lasted five years.

Until shortly before his death he was also a columnist for the daily Italian newspaper Corriere della Sera, which he had worked for since the early 1970s.

== Awards ==
1953 – Riccione Prize for "Giulia viene da lontano"

1971 – Premio Bancarella for "Testimone del tempo"

1979 – Saint-Vincent Prize for Journalism

1979 – Gold Medal of Civic Merit from the Municipality of Milan

1993 – Honorary President of the Jury for the "È giornalismo" Prize

2003 – Honorary Citizenship of Fucecchio, the birthplace of Indro Montanelli

2004 – Award for the program "Il Fatto" as the best journalistic program of the first fifty years of Rai

2005 – Ilaria Alpi Television Journalism Career Award
