= Editto bulgaro =

Statement of Silvio Berlusconi

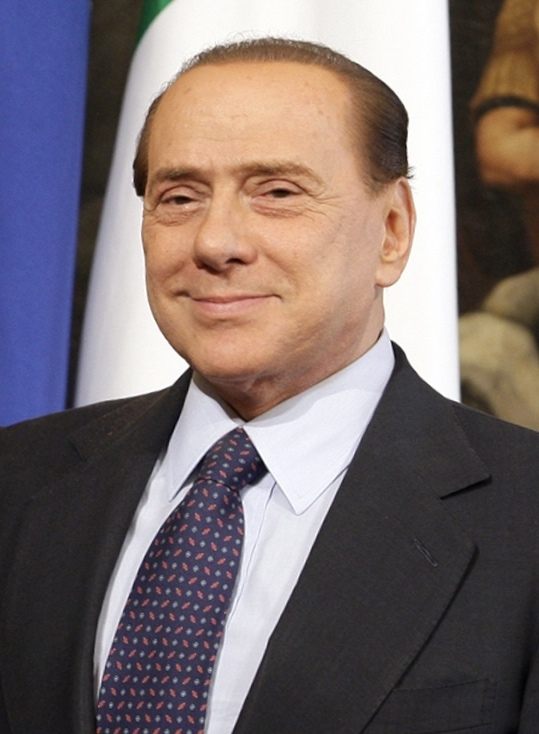
Silvio Berlusconi

The Editto bulgaro (English: "Bulgarian Edict"), also referred to as the "Bulgarian Diktat" (Diktat bulgaro) or "Bulgarian Ukase" (Ukase bulgaro) in Italian newspapers, was a statement of Silvio Berlusconi, at the time Prime Minister of Italy, about the behavior of three figures of Italian media and television – namely journalists Enzo Biagi and Michele Santoro and comedian Daniele Luttazzi – which was pronounced during a press conference with Simeon Saxe-Coburg-Gotha, at the time Prime Minister of Bulgaria, on 18 April 2002. It was soon followed by the removal of the three from national television.

== Statement ==
L'uso che Biagi -- come si chiama quell'altro...? Santoro, ma l'altro... Luttazzi -- hanno fatto della televisione pubblica, pagata coi soldi di tutti, è un uso criminoso. E io credo che sia un preciso dovere da parte della nuova dirigenza di non permettere più che questo avvenga.

=== English translation ===
The use that Biagi – what's the name of the other one? Santoro, but the other one ... Luttazzi – have made of public television, paid with everyone's money, is criminal. I believe that it is a precise duty of the new management [of RAI] to prevent this from happening again.

== Aftermath ==
After this statement, the then-new management of RAI cancelled Biagi's, Santoro's and Luttazzi's respective shows, officially because "they were no longer competitive" (though the figures portrayed very good results). Biagi and Santoro were allowed to work with RAI after Berlusconi's House of Freedoms was defeated in the 2006 Italian general election, but Daniele Luttazzi is still banned from RAI. He went back on television briefly when the La7 network hired him in 2007.

=== Aftermath for Enzo Biagi ===
Enzo Biagi began a controversy with the RAI, and initially his show, Il fatto (The Fact) was moved to a late time, then moved to the channel Rai 3 and in the end cancelled. Feeling himself mocked by the RAI, he decided not to renegotiate his contract with the network. The contract expired on December 31, 2002.

Biagi continued to criticize Berlusconi in Italy's leading newspaper, Corriere della Sera, and was defended by the direction of the newspaper in an argument with Berlusconi.

He reappeared on television on May 26, 2005, when he was interviewed by Fabio Fazio for Che tempo che fa of Rai 3. He returned to Fazio's program twice. He was invited to the show Rockpolitic along with Luttazzi and Santoro for an episode about freedom of press, but he and Luttazzi declined to appear, because the show was on Rai 1, whose director approved of "Editto Bulgaro".

On April 22, 2007 he returned to TV with a program called RT – Rotocalco Televisivo (Television Magazine), but after seven episodes he could not continue due to his worsening health. He died ten days afterwards, on November 6, 2007, in Milan, at the age of 87.

=== Aftermath for Michele Santoro ===
Forza Italia, Berlusconi's party, sued RAI because of Santoro's show on six separate counts, which led to Santoro's dismissal.

Santoro sued RAI for unfair dismissal, and won the case in 2005, with a compensation of €1,400,000 and the reintegration in the same time range in TV with the program Anno Zero.

=== Aftermath for Daniele Luttazzi ===
Luttazzi's show Satyricon was suspended in December 2002. Satyricon had high shares, with audience peaks of 7.5 million.

The reason was his interview of journalist Marco Travaglio, aired before the official start of the 2001 general elections campaign (an Italian law forbids to discuss political themes – outside political debates and ads – after the campaign has started). In this interview, Travaglio talked about his book L'odore dei soldi ("The smell of money"), in which he questioned the obscure origin of Berlusconi's wealth at the beginning of his career, and the alleged liaisons of him and one of his closest aides (Marcello Dell'Utri) with the Mafia (Dell'Utri is currently serving a seven-year prison term: he has been found guilty of complicity in conspiracy with the Mafia).

Following the interview, in fact, Luttazzi and Travaglio were sued separately by Berlusconi, his party Forza Italia, the enterprises Fininvest and Mediaset (directly linked to Berlusconi). The two were accused of having damaged Berlusconi's image during the campaign as well as the image of the above-mentioned enterprises. Both Luttazzi and Travaglio were later ruled not guilty (according to the judges, all they had told in the interview was based on true facts and documents, and the interview took place before the official beginning of the campaign). A later edition of L'odore dei soldi triumphantly read on the cover "the authors released [from any accusation], Berlusconi ruled to pay for legal expenses".

Luttazzi is still banned from RAI. He went back on TV in 2007, when the network La7 hosted five episodes of his new show, Decameron, until its abrupt cancellation in December. The official motivation was a crude joke addressed to journalist Giuliano Ferrara, a well-known supporter of Berlusconi and former Minister for the Relationship [of the government] with the Parliament. Ferrara hosted his own show on La7, Otto e Mezzo ("Half past Eight", after the time at which the show usually aired), and the network claimed that Luttazzi, by offending him with the above-mentioned joke, had gone too far. Luttazzi claimed the alleged offence to Ferrara was a scapegoat, as the opening monologue in the next episode of his show, already taped, was focusing on the pope, Luttazzi hinting that the network wanted to prevent that episode from being aired. La7 sued Luttazzi. 2012: Luttazzi won his legal battle against La7. La7 paid Luttazzi 1 million 2 hundred thousand euros.

== See also ==
- Critical geopolitics

== Sources ==
- Berlusconi: "Via Santoro, Biagi e Luttazzi", an article from Corriere della Sera about Editto Bulgaro
- The Editto Bulgaro on YouTube.
