= Michele Santoro =

Italian journalist (born 1951)

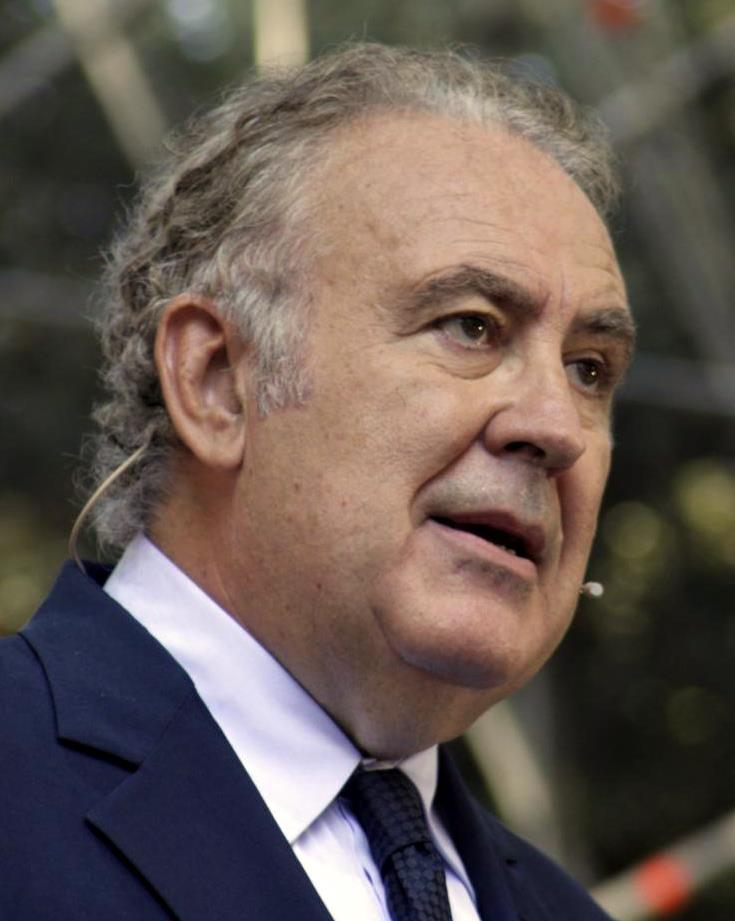
- Santoro in 2011

Member of the European Parliament
- In office 14 July 2004 – 13 November 2005
- Constituency: Southern Italy

Personal details
- Born: 2 July 1951 (age 75) Salerno, Italy
- Party: United in the Olive Tree (2004–2005); Independent (2005–2023); Peace Land Dignity (2023–present)
- Spouse: Sanja Podgajski (1997)
- Occupation: Journalist; television host; television presenter
- Website: http://www.michelesantoro.it/

Michele Santoro (born 2 July 1951) is an Italian journalist, television host and presenter.

He also served till October 2005 as Member of the European Parliament for Southern Italy with the United in the Olive Tree list, part of the Socialist Group and sat on the European Parliament's Committee on Civil Liberties, Justice and Home Affairs, being a substitute for the Committee on Culture and Education, a member of the Delegation to the EU-Russia Parliamentary Cooperation Committee and a substitute for the Delegation to the EU-Croatia Joint Parliamentary Committee.

== Education and career ==
Santoro was born in Salerno.

A graduate in philosophy, he made a successful debut in the Italian media as editor-in-chief on the regional newspaper La Voce della Campania ("Voice of Campania") and collaborating with some other national newspapers and magazines like Il Mattino, L'Unità and Epoca.

Before being hired by RAI, he had had some experience with a number of radio stations. He started his RAI career in TG3, the Rai 3 news division, first as a foreign correspondent, then creating and producing TV specials and weekly TV magazines, and finally working as chief culture correspondent, again for TG3.

=== News shows ===
Santoro's popularity was essentially based on being the author and anchorman for TV journalism broadcasts like Samarcanda, Il rosso e il nero and Temporeale, all strongly left-wing oriented, the broadcasts took place during a period of political turmoil in Italy, such as Mani pulite. These often involved debates with politicians, along with ground-breaking reports and questions from the audience. Santoro's shows were seen as places where the Italian people confronted their politicians, often perceived to be corrupt or inept. His shows have always been criticized for the leftism and lack of impartiality like in the last years with attacks against Berlusconi and other right wing Italian MPs.

Santoro left RAI in 1996, because of disagreements with the public television's direction, and briefly worked in Silvio Berlusconi's networks; he left Mediaset because of Berlusconi's continuing political role that he felt to be in conflict with his influence as the country's main media entrepreneur. After his return, he led two shows, Circus, on Rai 1, and Sciuscià, on Rai 2. The latter was often made up of a series of reportages, narrated in movie style.

In recent years he has been continually accused of partisanship by the right-wing coalition House of Freedoms led by Berlusconi, whose family holding company controls Mediaset, who installed a new board in the state-owned RAI after their electoral victory in the 2001 Italian general election. Sciuscià remained on the air until May 2002.

=== Attacks from Berlusconi ===
The new RAI board installed by the centre-right government decided not to renew Santoro's contract. This followed a declaration by Silvio Berlusconi, then prime minister of Italy, at a press conference in Sofia, Bulgaria, where he stated: "Santoro, Biagi and Luttazzi used the public TV, paid by all, in a manner which is criminal. I believe it to be a specific duty of the new RAI board not to allow this to happen again."

Soon after, neither Santoro nor the two others obtained any more work for RAI, and working for Berlusconi's own TV networks (the other half of the TV system) was obviously unviable. A legal dispute has been ongoing since Santoro contested a violation of his contract by RAI. He was supported by a court decision that should have forced RAI to give him the direction of a news magazine, but in the end Santoro was omitted.

== European Parliament candidate ==
In the 2004 European elections, Santoro accepted the offer of candidacy proposed by the centre-left confederation called United in the Olive Tree. He was elected as an MEP with a great poll success, obtaining a total of more than 700,000 votes in Italy as a whole. In the southern-Italian mandate, Santoro defeated Silvio Berlusconi himself with 526,535 votes against 452,326.

Michele Santoro resigned as an MEP on 19 October 2005, basing his decision on his desire to go back to his work on RAI, citing a judicial verdict which obliged the Italian national television to reinstate him. Contemporaneously, he announced his participation in RockPolitik, a controversial and long-awaited TV show on Rai 1, hosted by singer Adriano Celentano, to talk about issues of media censorship, after Luttazzi and Biagi refused to be guests on the show.

== Return to RAI and later years ==
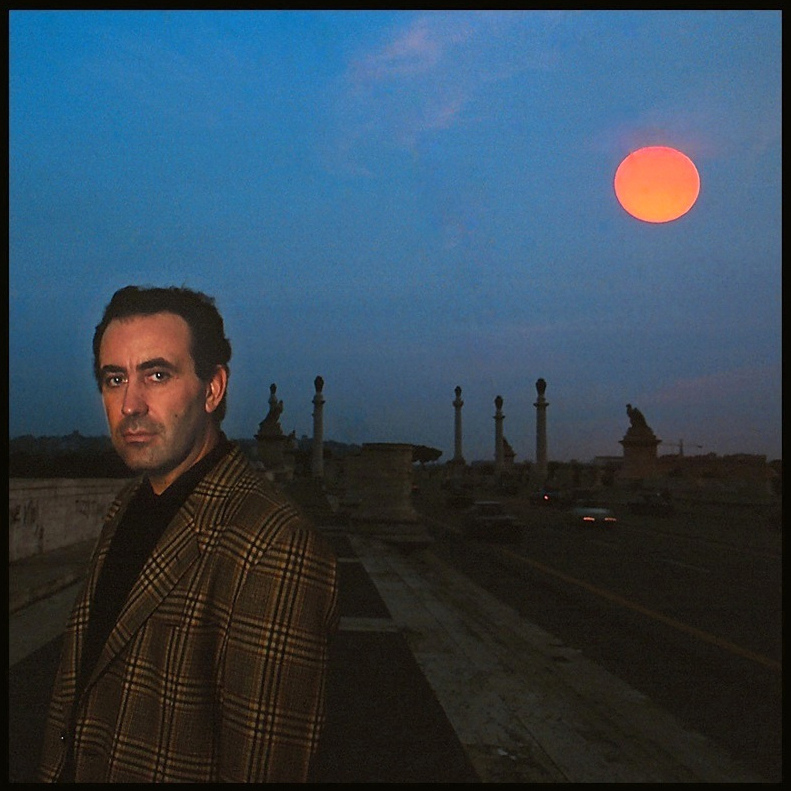
Santoro in 1987, photographed by Augusto De Luca

Following his resignation from the European Parliament, he started working on a new TV news magazine called AnnoZero (Year Zero) broadcast on Rai 2 and Rai Extra and initially scheduled to be aired first on 27 April 2006; its debut was, however, delayed and it started on 14 September. The show's regular commentators consist of the journalist Marco Travaglio and the cartoonist Vauro. The episode of the show aired on 8 March 2007, which featured Italian Minister of Justice Clemente Mastella as a special guest, caused controversy for his strong position on the DiCo issue. Mastella walked out of the programme in protest during its live broadcast.

At the end of 2011, Santoro did not renew his agreement with RAI and LA7 and decided to establish a TV magazine with distribution on local TV channels and live internet streaming. Later, he signed an agreement with Sky TG24.

In 2012, he returned to LA7 with a new political talk show named Servizio Pubblico. On 10 January 2013, together with Marco Travaglio, he hosted Silvio Berlusconi in an episode of his show that became the most-viewed episode in the history of LA7. He hosted the show until 2015.

In 2016, Santoro briefly returned to RAI with a new talk show titled Italia for six episodes.

== European election of 2024 ==
In 2024, after having organized a number of "peace-related" events in support of Italy reducing its political involvement in the Russo-Ukrainian War, Santoro presented a new political list named Peace Land Dignity, composed of several minor left-wing parties and independent members. The list participated in the 2024 European Parliament election in Italy but failed to win any seats.

== See also ==
- Editto Bulgaro – Berlusconi's declaration about Santoro, Biagi and Luttazzi.
