= Daniele Luttazzi =

Italian actor (born 1961)

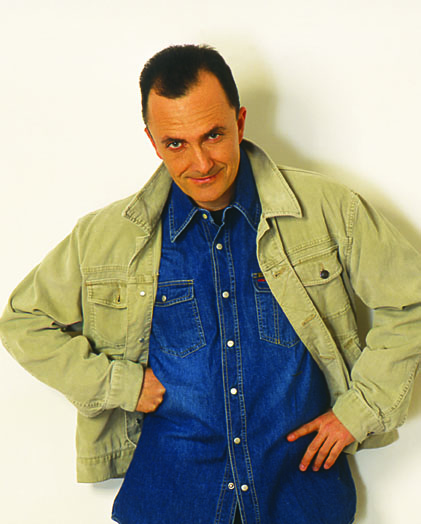
- Born: Daniele Fabbri; 26 January 1961 (age 65); Santarcangelo di Romagna, Rimini, Italy
- Occupation: Actor

Daniele Luttazzi (Italian pronunciation: [daˈnjɛːle lutˈtattsi]; born Daniele Fabbri on 26 January 1961) is an Italian theater actor, writer, satirist, illustrator and singer. His stage name is an homage to musician and actor Lelio Luttazzi.

== Biography ==
Luttazzi was born in Santarcangelo di Romagna, province of Rimini.

He began his comic career performing satirical monologues in theatre shows and writing comedy books. In 1988, his monologue won an award in a comedy contest held at Rome's Teatro Sistina. From 1989, he began working in TV variety shows: Fate il vostro gioco (1989, Rai 2), Banane (1989, Telemontecarlo), Magazine 3 (1993, 1994, Rai 3), Mai Dire Gol (1996, 1997, Italia 1). In 1998, he hosted his own late night show, Barracuda (Italia 1).

In 2001, his next TV show, called Satyricon, was aired by the public channel Rai 2. In March 2001, Luttazzi interviewed journalist Marco Travaglio about "L'odore dei soldi" (The Scent of Money), a book on the mysterious origins of Silvio Berlusconi's wealth: bank Rasini, a bank largely used by Italian mafia for money laundering. The next year, shortly after Berlusconi's statement on the "criminal use of public television" made by Luttazzi (see Editto bulgaro), Luttazzi's show was cancelled by RAI's management. Since then, Luttazzi has been often cited by the European press (i.e. The Economist, Le Monde, El País) as proof of Mr. Berlusconi's censorship of the opposition.

After television, Luttazzi toured Italy doing theatre shows and wrote books. He returned on TV in 2007 with the new satirical program "Decameron: Politica, Sesso, Religione e Morte" (Decameron: Politics, Sex, Religion and Death) for the private channel La7. Eventually his show was suspended after a controversial joke on journalist Giuliano Ferrara (who was working for La7 too). 2012: Luttazzi wins his legal battle against La7. La7 shall pay Luttazzi 1 million 2 hundred thousand euros.

In 2009 he opened a satire gym on his blog. The authors of Lercio.it were trained at his school.

== Controversies ==
In 1994, Susanna Tamaro, bestselling author of Va' dove ti porta il cuore, sued Luttazzi for plagiarism after his parody "Va' dove ti porta il clito". Luttazzi won the trial: it was ruled a parody, not plagiarism.

Over the years, several detractors have accused Luttazzi of "plagiarism". One of the most assiduous was Christian Rocca, a journalist from Il Foglio (a conservative newspaper controlled by Silvio Berlusconi's family): after the first episodes of "Satyricon" (Rai 2, 2001), Rocca accused Luttazzi of copying the David Letterman Show. Luttazzi replied that "Satyricon" was a parody of Letterman. Rocca took things further in 2007, claiming that the joke about Giuliano Ferrara, which led to the closure of the program "Decameron" (La7), was plagiarism from Bill Hicks. In 2012 a judge ruled the joke was not plagiarized and La7 was sentenced to pay 1,200,000 euro as compensation to Luttazzi.

In January 2008 an anonymous blog listed a series of jokes in English claiming that Luttazzi had "plagiarized" them, and in June 2010, two months after Luttazzi's tv monologue on "Raiperunanotte", an anonymous video was released online comparing jokes by English-speaking comedians with jokes by Luttazzi. Italian newspapers reported the news. Luttazzi replied that that video was defamatory because it did not tell the whole truth: since the opening of his blog (2005) he has invited fans to find the quotes hidden in his monologues, through a game reported on the blog's home page, the "treasure hunt". Luttazzi also calls the allegations "naive", explaining why those jokes are not "plagiarized", but "calqued", which is a fair use of original material.

Five years before those allegations, Luttazzi wrote that he adds famous comedians' material to his work as a defense against the million-euro lawsuits he has to face because of his satire. Luttazzi calls his ruse "the Lenny Bruce trick" after a similar trick played by his hero, Lenny Bruce. Luttazzi asks his readers to find out the original jokes. He awards a prize to anyone who finds a "nugget", i.e. a reference to famous jokes: he calls the game "treasure hunt". Luttazzi's blog lists all the comedians and writers quoted in his works.

In Luttazzi's defense, film director Roberto Faenza quoted Roberto Benigni: Benigni compares Luttazzi's copying to the greatest artists' copying, writers like Virgil, Ovid, Dante, Shakespeare, Buster Keaton, Eduardo De Filippo, and Woody Allen.

== Works ==
=== Books ===
- 101 cose da evitare a un funerale, Modena, Comix, 1993. ISBN 88-7686-221-8.
- Locuste. Come le formiche, solo più cattive, Modena, Comix, 1994. ISBN 88-7686-496-2. Le 101 locuste sono poi state incluse nelle prime edizioni di CRAMPO.
- Sesso con Luttazzi, Modena, Comix, 1994. ISBN 88-7686-497-0; Milano, Mondadori, 2000. ISBN 88-04-47641-9.
- Adenoidi, Milano, Bompiani, 1995. ISBN 88-452-2446-5; Milano, Rizzoli, 1999. ISBN 88-17-68016-8
- Va' dove ti porta il clito, Modena, Comix, 1995. ISBN 88-7686-630-2; 1996. ISBN 88-7686-681-7
- C.R.A.M.P.O. Corso Rapido di Apprendimento Minimo per Ottenebrati, Modena, Comix, 1996. ISBN 88-8193-009-9. Le prime edizioni contenevano in appendice, Locuste.
- Gioventù Cannibale, con altri, Torino, Einaudi, 1996. ISBN 88-06-14268-2.
- "Tabloid", Modena, Comix, 1997. ISBN 88-8193-017-X; 1997. ISBN 88-8193-040-4.
- Teatro. Rettili & roditori, Scene da un adulterio, Modena, Comix, 1998. ISBN 88-8193-056-0.
- Cosmico! Una valida alternativa all'intrattenimento intelligente, Milano, Mondadori, 1998. ISBN 88-04-45082-7.
- Barracuda, Milano, Mondadori, 1999. ISBN 88-04-45850-X.
- Luttazzi Satyricon, Milano, Mondadori, 2001. ISBN 88-04-49523-5.
- Benvenuti in Italia, Milano, Feltrinelli, 2002. ISBN 88-07-84011-1.
- Capolavori, Milano, Feltrinelli, 2002. ISBN 88-07-84021-9.
- La castrazione e altri metodi infallibili per prevenire l'acne, Milano, Feltrinelli, 2003. ISBN 88-07-84029-4.
- Bollito misto con mostarda, Milano, Feltrinelli, 2005. ISBN 88-07-84054-5. It includes I giardini dell'epistassi.
- Lepidezze postribolari, ovvero Populorum progressio, Milano, Feltrinelli, 2007. ISBN 88-07-84077-4.
- La guerra civile fredda, Milano, Feltrinelli, 2009. ISBN 978-88-07-70213-6.
- La quarta necessità (disegni di Massimo Giacon), Milano, Rizzoli, 2011. ISBN 8817053473.
- Lolito. Una parodia, Roma, il Fatto Quotidiano, 2013; Milano, Chiarelettere, 2013. ISBN 8861904580.
- Bloom Porno-Teo-Kolossal, Roma, il Fatto Quotidiano, 2015.

=== Translations and prefaces ===
- Translation of Daniel Clowes, L'antologia ufficiale di Lloyd LLewellyn, Bologna, Telemaco, 1992.
- Introduction to Francesca Ghermandi, Hiawata Pete, Bologna, Granata Press, 1993. Nuova edizione: Coconino Press, 2008. ISBN 978-88-7618-112-2.
- Preface to Daniele Brolli e Roberto Baldazzini, Trans/Est, Bologna, Phoenix, 1994.
- Preface to Lenny Bruce, Come parlare sporco e influenzare la gente, Milano, Bompiani, 1995. ISBN 88-452-2445-7.
- Preface to Massimo Giacon, Sexorcismo 2000, Roma, Mare Nero, 2000. ISBN 9788887495072.
- Translation and introduction to Woody Allen, Effetti collaterali, Milano, Tascabili Bompiani, 2004. ISBN 88-452-3304-9.
- Translation and introduction to Woody Allen, Senza piume, Milano, Tascabili Bompiani, 2004. ISBN 88-452-3305-7.
- Translation and introduction to Woody Allen Rivincite, Milano, Tascabili Bompiani, 2004. ISBN 88-452-3306-5.
- Introduction to Stan Lee e John Romita Sr., The complete Spider-Man, vol. II, 29/1/1979-11/1/1981, Modena, Panini Comics, 2007. ISBN 978-88-8343-717-5.

=== Music ===
- 2005 – Money for Dope (EMI)
- 2007 – School Is Boring (EDEL)

=== Tv programs ===
- Fate il vostro gioco, 1989 – Rai 2
- Banane, 1990 – TMC
- Magazine 3, 1994–95 – Rai 3
- Mai dire gol, 1995–98 – Italia 1
- Barracuda, 1998–99 – Italia 1
- Satyricon, 2001 – Rai 2
- Decameron, 2007 – La7

=== Theatrical monologues ===
- Non qui, Barbara, nessuno ci sta guardando (1989)
- Oggi in tutta la mia casa c'è uno splendore nuovo (1990)
- Chi ha paura di Daniele Luttazzi? (1991)
- Sesso con Luttazzi (1993, 1999, 2003, 2008)
- Va' dove ti porta il clito (1995, 2009)
- Adenoidi (1996)
- Tabloid (1997)
- Barracuda LIVE (1998)
- Satyricon (2001)
- Adenoidi 2003 (2003)
- Dialoghi platonici (2003) (recitati da attori dello Stabile di Genova e dell'Archivolto, per la regia di Giorgio Gallione)
- Bollito misto con mostarda (2004)
- Come uccidere causando inutili sofferenze (2005)
- Barracuda 2007 (2007)
- Decameron (2008)

=== Music concerts ===
- Songbook (2009)
