= Giorgio Mulé =

Italian politician and journalist (born 1968)

Giorgio Mulè
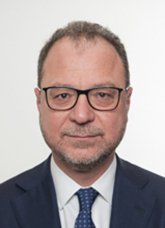
- Official portrait, 2018

Vice President of the Chamber of Deputies
- In office 19 October 2022
- President: Lorenzo Fontana

Undersecretary of State at the Ministry of Justice (with Stefania Pucciarelli)
- In office 1 March 2021 – 19 October 2022
- Prime Minister: Mario Draghi
- Preceded by: Giulio Calvisi; Angelo Tofalo
- Succeeded by: Matteo Perego; Isabella Rauti

Member of the Chamber of Deputies
- In office 23 March 2018
- Parliamentary group: Forza Italia – Berlusconi Presidente
- Constituency: Liguria (2018–2022); Sicilia 1 (since 2022)

Spokesperson of Forza Italia
- In office 10 April 2018 –3 August 2023
- President: Silvio Berlusconi
- Preceded by: Deborah Bergamini
- Succeeded by: Raffaele Nevi

Personal details
- Born: 25 April 1968 (age 58) 25 April 1968 Caltanissetta, Italy
- Party: Forza Italia
- Education: University of Palermo
- Profession: Journalist

Giorgio Mulé (born 25 April 1968) is an Italian politician and journalist who is a member of the Chamber of Deputies since 2018. Born in Caltanisetta and a graduate of the University of Palermo, Mulé was director of Videonews from 2006 to 2007, Studio Aperto from 2007 to 2009, and of Panorama from 2009 to 2018. From 2018 to 2022, Mulé was vice-president of the Chamber of Deputies. From 1 March 2021 to 19 October 2022, he was Undersecretary of State at the Ministry of Defence in the Draghi government. In 2023, he became part of the steering committee of the Institute of International Affairs (IAI).

== Early life and career ==
Mulè was born on 25 April 1968 in Caltanissetta, in the Italian region of Sicily. After studying in Mazara del Vallo, he graduated in Communication Sciences at the University of Palermo. In 1989, he began his journalistic career at the Giornale di Sicilia in Palermo as a crime and judicial reporter, with a stint in New York City at Il Progresso Italoamericano. In 1992, he moved to Il Giornale, then directed by Indro Montanelli.

In 1996, the director Vittorio Feltri entrusted Mulé with the responsibility of leading the newly created news of Rome and then the Roman editorial team. He moved to Panorama, where in a short time (after having held various positions, from correspondent to editor-in-chief) he became first deputy director and then deputy executive director. After the move of director Carlo Rossella to TG5, there was talk of his possible leadership at Panorama; in the end, Mondadori entrusted the task to fellow countryman Pietro Calabrese. Mulè then moved on to direct Panorama Economy from 25 November 2004.

Since December 2005, in addition to his editor-in-chief role at Panorama Economy, Mulé held the position of deputy director of Videonews, the structure that takes care of in-depth journalistic programmes at Mediaset. In May 2006, he was appointed director of Videonews; he left his career in print media. Sergio Luciano succeeded him at the helm of Panorama Economy. Among his most successful programmes was Tempi Moderni, a programme that focused on current affairs investigations, broadcast on Rete 4, edited by Fabio Tricoli and Antonello Sette, and hosted by Irene Pivetti (in the first edition) and by Irene Pivetti (in the first edition) and by Ilaria Cavo (in the second).

From 11 October 2007 to 31 August 2009, Muleè directed Studio Aperto, the Italia 1 news programme, succeeding Mario Giordano. In August 2008, he signed up to the Italia 1 programme Tutto in 1 notte, the Studio Aperto weekly programme, and subsequently also Rewind, Borders and Live. From 1 September 2009 to 31 January 2018, he was the director of the weekly Panorama (for which he had previously held the position of deputy executive director), succeeding Maurizio Belpietro, and of the weekly Economy. In 2014, he was a temporary extraordinary professor of Communication Theories and Techniques at the Università degli Studi Pegaso in Naples.

== Political career ==
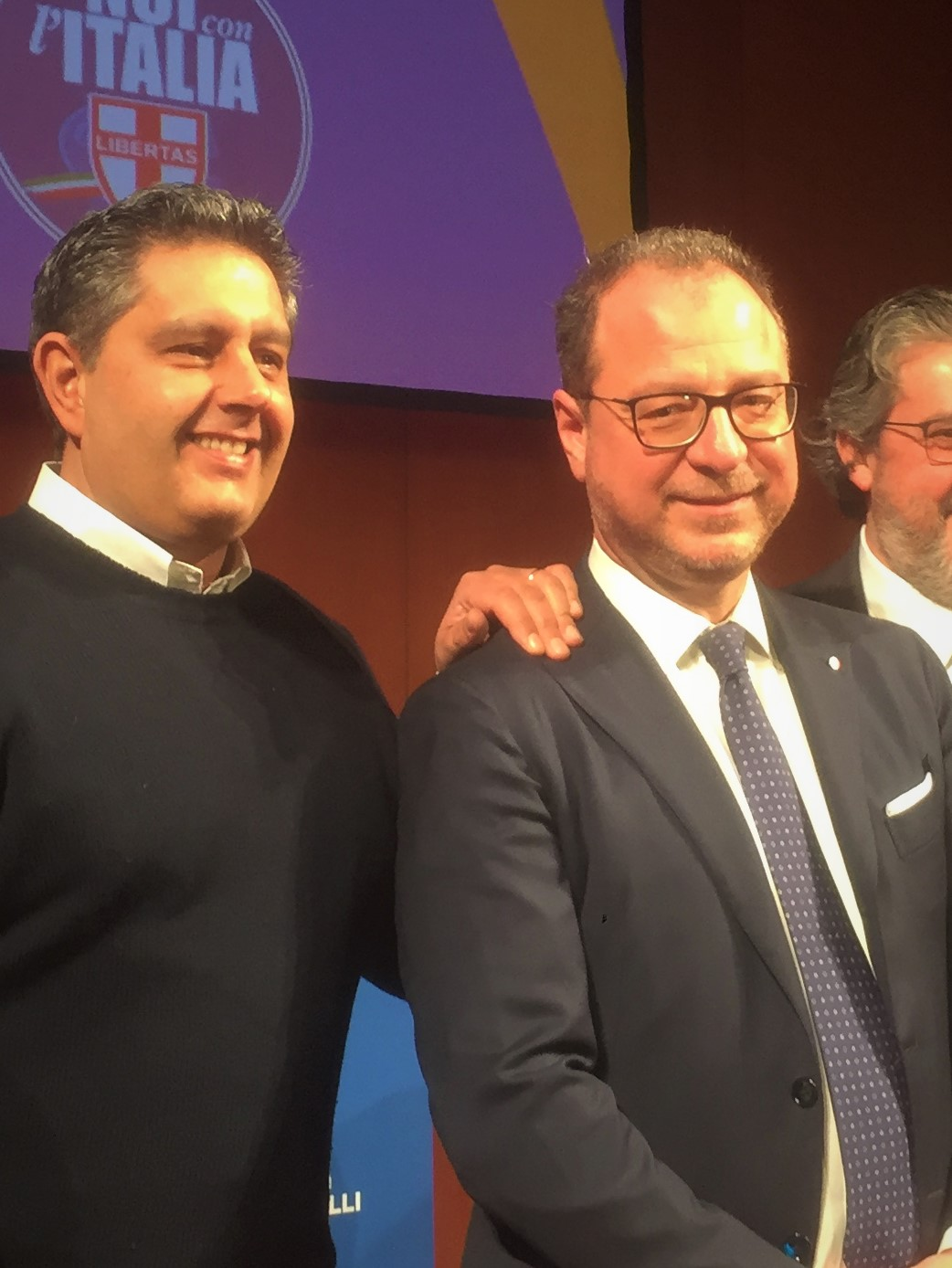
Mulè on stage with Giovanni Toti during the 2018 Italian general election

In the runup to the 2018 Italian general election, Mulè joined Forza Italia (FI). After resigning from the management of Panorama, he ran for the Chamber of Deputies in the single-member constituency of Sanremo as part of the centre-right coalition, where he was elected deputy with over 46% of the votes against the Five Star Movement (M5S) Federico Firmian (29.15%) and of the centre-left coalition and Democratic Party (PD) candidate Anna Russo (17.76%). Despite his candidacy in the single-member constituency of Sanremo, he was also the lead candidate in the first multi-member constituency of Liguria.

In the 14 February episode of Porta a Porta, Mulé stated that his campaign would launch during December 2017 when the well-known journalist met Silvio Berlusconi and they discussed a political commitment. Mulè said he took two days to think about it and subsequently accepted the Forza Italia leader's proposal. On 10 April, he was appointed sole spokesperson of Forza Italia groups in the Chamber of Deputies and Senate of the Republic. He was the group leader of Forza Italia in the parliamentary commission for the general direction and supervision of radio and television services, as well as being a member of the 9th Transport, Post and Telecommunications Commission.

On 30 June 2019, the Chamber of Deputies approved the text, of which Mulè was the promoter, rapporteur, and first signatory, for the adoption and use of defibrillators in non-hospital environments. Law subsequently approved on 28 July 2021 by the Social Affairs Committee of the Chamber of Deputies in the legislative session and published on Gazzetta Ufficiale on 13 August 2021. On 19 December, he also became responsible for the national departments of Forza Italia in place of Adriano Galliani. On 12 May 2020, Berlusconi appointed a new coordination of 14 people including Mulè.

In August 2020, a few weeks after the 2020 Italian constitutional referendum on the cut in the number of parliamentarians linked to the reform initiated by the first Conte government and concluded by the second Conte government, Mulè announced, after voting "yes" in the assembly, his vote against; this was in dissidence with the official line of Forza Italia, which was initially aligned for the "Yes" by the leaders of the parliamentary group before Berlusconi positioned himself in an intermediate position granting a free vote.

On 24 February 2021, Mulé was appointed Undersecretary of State of the Ministry of Defence in the new Draghi government. In the 2022 Italian general election, he was nominated for the Chamber of Deputies as the leader in the multi-member dictrict of Palermo and was elected. On 19 October, he was elected vice president of the Chamber of Deputies.

== Awards and recognitions ==
During his career, Mulé was awarded numerous awards throughout, including for his anti-mafia commitment with the "Ninni Cassarà" award in 2011, his capacity for innovation with the "Biagio Agnes" award in 2017, the Lex Spoletina for having accomplished a continuous and relevant action aimed at enhancing and promoting the city of Spoleto in 2019, and the Bonifacio VIII International Award "For a culture of Peace" in 2021. He was a promoter and first signatory of the bill AC 2451 (AS 1894) which provides for the establishment of the "National Day in memory of the victims of the COVID-19 pandemic" approved unanimously by the Chamber of Deputies on 23 July 2020 to make the memory alive of all those who have lost their lives due to the health emergency. The proposal was subsequently approved by the Senate of the Republic and Law no. 35 of 2021 established the National Day in memory of the victims of COVID-19, set on 18 March of each year.

On 26 October 2021, Mulé was also awarded by Colombian president Iván Duque Márquez the honour of Oficial del Orden de San Carlos for those who help and support Colombian institutions and citizens. In November 2021, he was appointed Patron of the International Forum for Peace, Security and Prosperity as he was recognized as an "ambassador" of the mission and vision of the forum which are based on the ability to guarantee justice, safeguarding democracy and freedom. In June 2023, Mulé was awarded the title of Grand Officer of the Order of Naval Merit of Brazil, an honour reserved "exceptionally" for foreign personalities, awarded by Brazilian president Luiz Inácio Lula da Silva.

== Works ==
- — (2013). Doppia verità – Il giallo di Cogne: le tesi di accusa e difesa sull'omicidio di Samuele. Milan: Mondadori.
