= AnnoZero =

- Presented by: Michele Santoro
- Country of origin: Italy
- Original language: Italian

Original release
- Network: Rai 2 Raisat Extra
- Release: 14 September 2006 – 28 June 2011

AnnoZero is an Italian television talk show hosted by Italian journalist Michele Santoro and was broadcast on Rai 2 from 2006 to 2011.

Beatrice Borromeo was a collaborator on this show from 2006 to 2008, and Francesca Fagnani served as an investigative journalist from 2006 to 2010. Journalist Marco Travaglio was a permanent guest on the show, which officially ended its run on 9 June 2011 with the last episode being shown on 28 June of that year.

== Seasons ==
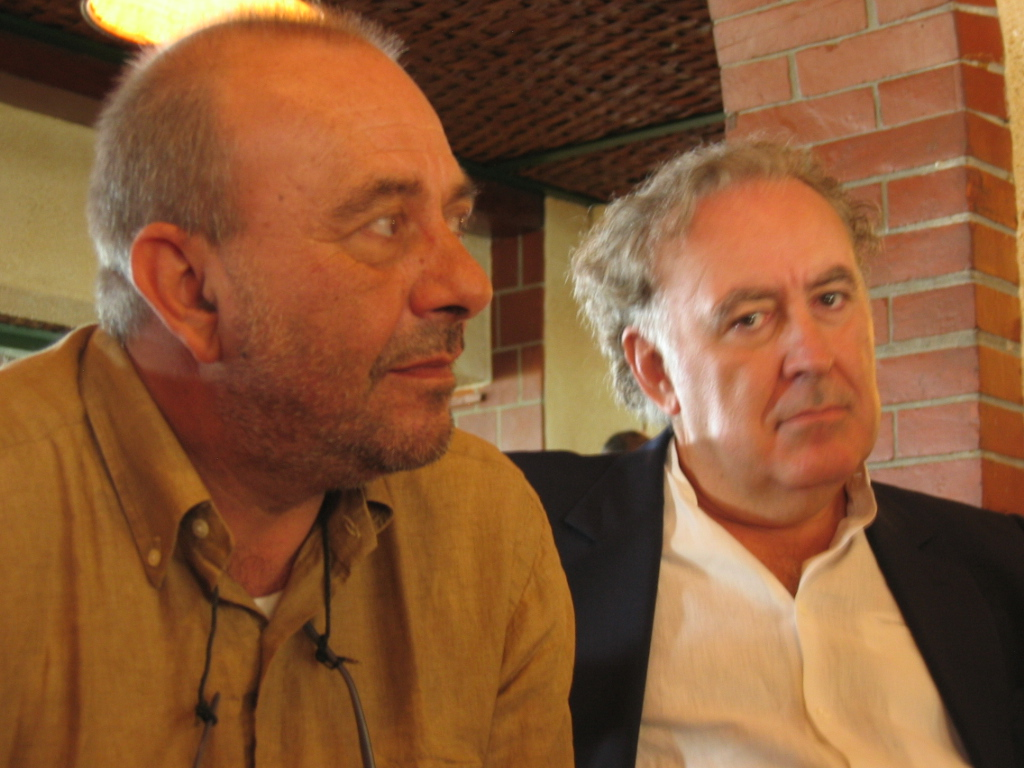
Satirical cartoonist Vauro Senesi (left) and Michele Santoro (2008)

=== First season ===
Featuring Michele Santoro, Marco Travaglio, Vauro Senesi, Sandro Ruotolo, Beatrice Borromeo, and Rula Jebreal.

1. 14-09-2006 – "Milano e l'immigrazione"
2. 21-09-2006 – "O' sistema"
3. 12-10-2006 – "Bologna: il lavoro e i precari"
4. 19-10-2006 – "La Calabria e la 'Ndrangheta"
5. 26-10-2006 – "Vicenza: piove governo ladro"
6. 09-11-2006 – "Padova: figli del Dio maggiore"
7. 16-11-2006 – "Palermo: meglio dentro che fuori"
8. 23-11-2006 – "Napoli: delitto e perdono"
9. 07-12-2006 – "Roma: guerrieri della libertà"

=== Second season ===
Featuring Michele Santoro, Marco Travaglio, Vauro Senesi, Sandro Ruotolo, and Beatrice Borromeo.

1. 08-03-2007 – "Orgoglio e pregiudizio"
2. 15-03-2007 – "Vicenza, casalinghe alla riscossa"
3. 29-03-2007 – "Amore mio"
4. 05-04-2007 – "Chi decide per me?"
5. 12-04-2007 – "E io pago!"
6. 19-04-2007 – "Vado al minimo"
7. 26-04-2007 – "Patrioti"
8. 03-05-2007 – "Baroni si nasce"
9. 10-05-2007 – "Dio salvi la famiglia!"
10. 17-05-2007 – "La casa è un sogno"
11. 24-05-2007 – "Troppo buoni?!"
12. 31-05-2007 – "Non commettere atti impuri"
13. 14-06-2007 – "Cavalli di razza"
14. 21-06-2007 – "Dimenticare il futuro"

=== Third season ===
Featuring Michele Santoro, Marco Travaglio, Vauro Senesi, Sandro Ruotolo, and Beatrice Borromeo.

1. 20-09-2007 – "Tsunami"
2. 27-09-2007 – "Va' da' via el cu"
3. 04-10-2007 – "A ciascuno il suo"
4. 11-10-2007 – "Ordine!"
5. 18-10-2007 – "I Perdenti"
6. 25-10-2007 – "A viso aperto"
7. 01-11-2007 – "Profondo Rosso"
8. 08-11-2007 – "Il partigiano Biagi"
9. 15-11-2007 – "Attenti ai nostri"
10. 22-11-2007 – "Ieri, oggi. E domani?"
11. 29-11-2007 – "Che casino?"
12. 06-12-2007 – "Libera o occupata"
13. 13-12-2007 – "Un Paese senza"
14. 20-12-2007 – "I buoni e i cattivi"
15. 24-01-2008 – "Chi di Mastella ferisce..."
16. 31-01-2008 – "Questioni d'onore"
17. 07-02-2008 – "Ancora tu"
18. 14-02-2008 – "San Valentino da soli"
19. 21-02-2008 – "Tutta colpa dei Verdi"
20. 28-02-2008 – "Liste pulite"
21. 06-03-2008 – "Basta un poco di zucchero?"
22. 13-03-2008 – "Sprechi con le ali"
23. 20-03-2008 – "Nel nome della Madre"
24. 27-03-2008 – "Io voto casa"
25. 31-03-2008 – "Un Paese in bilico"
26. 17-04-2008 – "Una storia italiana"
27. 24-04-2008 – "Ritorno a Gomorra"
28. 01-05-2008 – "O bella ciao"
29. 08-05-2008 – "La peggio gioventù"
30. 15-05-2008 – "Se li conosci, li eviti?"
31. 22-05-2008 – "Un presidente spazzino"
32. 30-05-2008 – "Il divo e noi"
33. 05-06-2008 – "Prove d'orchestra"

=== Fourth season ===
Featuring Michele Santoro, Marco Travaglio, Vauro Senesi, Sandro Ruotolo, Corrado Formigli, and Margherita Granbassi.

1. 25-09-2008 – "Il ritorno dei ‘Cai’mani""
2. 02-10-2008 – "Italiani ‘brutta’ gente"
3. 09-10-2008 – "I soldi sono nulla"
4. 16-10-2008 – "Chi perde paga"
5. 23-10-2008 – "Le mani sul futuro"
6. 30-10-2008 – "Io non ho paura"
7. 06-11-2008 – "Domani"
8. 13-11-2008 – "Fannullone a chi?"
9. 20-11-2008 – "Il futuro che mi merito"
10. 27-11-2008 – "Pane e ottimismo"
11. 04-12-2008 – "L'isola di Obama"
12. 11-12-2008 – "Aiuto, la crisi!"
13. 18-12-2008 – "Questione morale"
14. 15-01-2009 – "La guerra dei bambini"
15. 22-01-2009 – "Giulietta chi è?"
16. 29-01-2009 – "Io non ti salverò"
17. 05-02-2009 – "Il silenzio degli innocenti"
18. 12-02-2009 – "Eluana e Napoleone"
19. 26-02-2009 – "Quando finirà?"
20. 05-03-2009 – "Arrivano i mostri"
21. 12-03-2009 – "Il partito che non c'è"
22. 19-03-2009 – "Il rosso e il nero"
23. 26-03-2009 – "Tutti a casa!"
24. 02-04-2009 – "Lacrime e rabbia"
25. 09-04-2009 – "Resurrezione"
26. 16-04-2009 – "Caccia all'abusivo"
27. 23-04-2009 – "Il Paese dei manganelli"
28. 30-04-2009 – "È passata la bufera?"
29. 07-05-2009 – "Il complotto"
30. 15-05-2009 – "Mi gioco la Fiat"
31. 21-05-2009 – "Lasciamolo lavorare?"
32. 25-05-2009 – "I soldi son desideri"
33. 04-06-2009 – "Corri bisonte corri"
34. 11-06-2009 – "C'era una volta Enrico"

=== Fifth season ===
Featuring Michele Santoro, Marco Travaglio, Vauro Senesi, Sandro Ruotolo, Corrado Formigli, and Giulia Innocenzi.

#	Date	Title	Guests
1	24-09-2009	"Farabutti"	Maurizio Belpietro, Italo Bocchino, Concita De Gregorio, Dario Franceschini, and Enrico Mentana.
2	01-10-2009	"No Gianpy, no party"	Maurizio Belpietro, Michele Emiliano, Maria Latella, Nicola Porro, and Norma Rangeri.
3	08-10-2009	"Verità nascoste"	Felice Cavallaro, Massimo Ciancimino, Antonio Di Pietro, and Niccolò Ghedini.
4	15-10-2009	"Io sono l'eletto"	Maurizio Belpietro, Pier Luigi Bersani, Roberto Castelli, Curzio Maltese, and Alessandro Sallusti.
5	22-10-2009	"Il posto fesso"	Massimo Giannini, Maurizio Lupi, Ignazio Marino, and Nicola Porro.
6	29-10-2009	"Ricatti"	Maurizio Belpietro, Antonio Polito, and Debora Serracchiani, and Francesco Storace.
7	05-11-2009	"Profumo di mafia"	Italo Bocchino, Luigi de Magistris, Claudio Fava, Claudio Fazzone, and Alessandro Panigutti.
8	12-11-2009	“Fai la cosa giusta"	Maurizio Belpietro, Piercamillo Davigo, Antonio Di Pietro, and Fabio Granata.
9	19-11-2009	"Complotti e porcate"	Rosy Bindi, Aldo Cazzullo, Antonio Ingroia, Flavia Perina, and Gaetano Quagliariello.
10	26-11-2009	"L'avaro"	Pier Luigi Bersani, Massimo Giannini, Nicola Porro, and Giulio Tremonti.
11	03-12-2009	"Mister B."	Umberto Ambrosoli, Tarak Ben Ammar, Maurizio Belpietro, Niccolò Ghedini, and Peter Gomez.
12	10-12-2009	"Minchiate!"	Massimo Ciancimino, Antonio Di Pietro, Alfredo Mantovano, and Claudio Martelli.
13	17-12-2009	"I mandanti"	Pierluigi Battista, Antonio Di Pietro, Maurizio Lupi, and Andrea Nativi.
14	07-01-2010	"Che sarà?"	Roberto Castelli, Enrico Mentana, Alba Parietti, and Nichi Vendola.
15	14-01-2010	"La spremuta"	Roberto Cota, Alessandra Mussolini, Fabrizio Gatti, and Gad Lerner.
16	21-01-2010	"B & B"	Maurizio Gasparri, Luca Iosi, and Paolo Flores d'Arcais.
