= Belve (TV series) =

- Genre: Interview program
- Created by: Francesca Fagnani; Irene Ghergo
- Presented by: Francesca Fagnani
- Opening theme: "L'appuntamento" by Ornella Vanoni
- Country of origin: Italy
- Original language: Italian
- No. of seasons: 12
- No. of episodes: 64

Production
- Running time: 30–60 minutes (2018–2022); 120–130 minutes (from 2023)
- Production companies: Loft Produzioni (2018–2019); RAI (from 2021); Fremantle Italia (from 2023)

Original release
- Network: Nove (2018–2019); Rai 2 (2021–present)
- Release: 14 March 2018 – present

Belve (English: Beasts) is an Italian television interview show, hosted by journalist Francesca Fagnani. It aired on Nove from 14 March 2018 to 21 June 2019, and then moved to Rai 2 on 14 May 2021. The program consists of face-to-face interviews between Fagnani and "beasts", strong personalities from the world of entertainment, politics or news. It is produced by RAI in collaboration with Fremantle Italia.

A spin-off series named Belve Crime, focusing on figures from crime news, premiered on Rai 2 in June 2025.

== Format ==
Hosted by journalist Francesca Fagnani, the show consists of face-to-face interviews between Fagnani and "beasts", strong personalities from the world of entertainment, politics or news.

The theme song is "L'appuntamento", performed by Ornella Vanoni.

== Series overview ==
| Edition | Host | Release | | Episodes | Studio | Broadcast | | Director |
| Edition | Host | Start | End | Episodes | Studio | Network | Streaming | Director |
|---|---|---|---|---|---|---|---|---|
| 1 | Francesca Fagnani | 14 March 2018 | 4 April 2018 | 4 | Cherubini Studios, Bologna | Nove | Dplay | Matteo Forzano |
| 2 | Francesca Fagnani | 15 June 2018 | 6 July 2018 | 4 | Cherubini Studios, Bologna | Nove | Dplay | Matteo Forzano |
| 3 | Francesca Fagnani | 14 December 2018 | 28 December 2018 | 3 | Cherubini Studios, Bologna | Nove | Dplay | Matteo Forzano |
| 4 | Francesca Fagnani | 31 May 2019 | 21 June 2019 | 4 | Cherubini Studios, Bologna | Nove | Dplay Plus | Matteo Forzano |
| 5 | Francesca Fagnani | 14 May 2021 | 9 July 2021 | 9 | Studi televisivi Fabrizio Frizzi, Studio 3 | Rai 2 | RaiPlay | Flavia Unfer |
| 6 | Francesca Fagnani | 18 February 2022 | 22 April 2022 | 9 | Studi televisivi Fabrizio Frizzi, Studio 3 | Rai 2 | RaiPlay | Flavia Unfer |
| 8 | Francesca Fagnani | 1 December 2022 | 23 December 2022 | 9 | Studi televisivi Fabrizio Frizzi, Studio 3 | Rai 2 | RaiPlay | Mauro Stancati |
| 8 | Francesca Fagnani | 21 February 2023 | 21 March 2023 | 5 | Lumina Studios | Rai 2 | RaiPlay | Duccio Forzano |
| 9 | Francesca Fagnani | 26 September 2023 | 24 October 2023 | 5 | Studi televisivi Fabrizio Frizzi, Studio 3 | Rai 2 | RaiPlay | Mauro Stancati |
| 10 | Francesca Fagnani | 2 April 2024 | 30 April 2024 | 5 | Studi televisivi Fabrizio Frizzi, Studio 3 | Rai 2 | RaiPlay | Mauro Stancati |
| 11 | Francesca Fagnani | 19 November 2024 | 17 December 2024 | 5 | Studi televisivi Fabrizio Frizzi, Studio 3 | Rai 2 | RaiPlay | Mauro Stancati |
| 12 | Francesca Fagnani | 29 April 2025 | 3 June 2025 | 5 | Studi televisivi Fabrizio Frizzi, Studio 3 | Rai 2 | RaiPlay | Mauro Stancati |
| 13 | Francesca Fagnani | 28 October 2025 | 2 December 2025 | 5 | Studi televisivi Fabrizio Frizzi, Studio 3 | Rai 2 | RaiPlay | Mauro Stancati |
| 14 | Francesca Fagnani | 7 April 2026 | In progress | | Studi televisivi Fabrizio Frizzi, Studio 3 | Rai 2 | RaiPlay | Mauro Stancati |

== Episodes ==
=== First edition ===
| Episode | Airdate | Interviewed | Ratings | | |
| Episode | Airdate | Interviewed | Viewers | Share | Ref. |
|---|---|---|---|---|---|
| 1 | 14 March 2018 | Annamaria Bernardini de Pace | 199,000 | 1.3% | |
| 1 | 14 March 2018 | Adriana Faranda | 96,000 | 0.9% | |
| 2 | 21 March 2018 | Alessandra Mussolini | 181,000 | 1.2% | |
| 2 | 21 March 2018 | Francesca Immacolata Chaouqui | 89,000 | 0.8% | |
| 3 | 28 March 2018 | Roberta Bruzzone | – | | |
| 3 | 28 March 2018 | Cristina Pinto | – | | |
| 4 | 4 April 2018 | Giuliana De Sio | 173,000 | 1.2% | |
| 4 | 4 April 2018 | Marina Cicogna | 100,000 | 0.9% | |
| Average | | | 140,000 | 1.05% | – |

=== Second edition ===
| Episode | Airdate | Interviewed | Ratings | | |
| Episode | Airdate | Interviewed | Viewers | Share | Ref. |
|---|---|---|---|---|---|
| 1 | 15 June 2018 | Simona Ventura | 244,000 | 1.3% | |
| 2 | 22 June 2018 | Alda D'Eusanio | 224,000 | 1.3% | |
| 3 | 29 June 2018 | Claudia Gerini | 154,000 | 0.9% | |
| 4 | 6 July 2018 | Katia Ricciarelli | 179,000 | 1.1% | |
| Average | | | 200,000 | 1.15% | – |

=== Third edition ===
| Episode | Airdate | Interviewed | Ratings | | |
| Episode | Airdate | Interviewed | Viewers | Share | Ref. |
|---|---|---|---|---|---|
| 1 | 14 December 2018 | Alfonso Signorini | 293,000 | 1.7% | |
| 1 | 14 December 2018 | Nunzia De Girolamo | 149,000 | 1.3% | |
| 2 | 21 December 2018 | Giorgia Meloni | 322,000 | 1.7% | |
| 2 | 21 December 2018 | Annalisa Chirico | 204,000 | 1.4% | |
| 3 | 28 December 2018 | Paola Turci | – | | |
| 3 | 28 December 2018 | Marisela Federici | – | | |
| Average | | | 242,000 | 1.53% | – |

=== Fourth edition ===
| Episode | Airdate | Interviewed | | Ratings | | |
| Episode | Airdate | Interviewed | | Viewers | Share | Ref. |
|---|---|---|---|---|---|---|
| 1 | 31 May 2019 | Mara Carfagna | Alba Parietti | 230,000 | 1.3% | |
| 2 | 7 June 2019 | Maria Giovanna Maglie | Andrea Delogu | – | | |
| 3 | 14 June 2019 | Barbara Palombelli | Elisa Di Francisca | – | | |
| 4 | 21 June 2019 | Massimo Giletti | Daniela Santanchè | 185,000 | 2.4% | |
| Average | | | | 208,000 | 1.85% | – |

=== Fifth edition ===
| Episode | Airdate | Interviewed | | Ratings | | |
| Episode | Airdate | Interviewed | | Viewers | Share | Ref. |
|---|---|---|---|---|---|---|
| 1 | 14 May 2021 | Rosalinda Celentano | Arisa | 512,000 | 3.0% | |
| 2 | 21 May 2021 | Bianca Berlinguer | Sonia Bruganelli | 465,000 | 2.8% | |
| 3 | 28 May 2021 | Sabina Began | Barbara Alberti | 540,000 | 3.3% | |
| 4 | 4 June 2021 | Anna Carrino (Note: Anna Carrino, the wife of Neopolitan mafia lieutenant Francesco Bidognetti, collaborated with police against the Camorra crime syndicate.) | Laura Ravetto | 382,000 | 2.7% | |
| 5 | 11 June 2021 | Anna Tatangelo | Marco Travaglio | 586,000 | 3.9% | |
| 6 | 18 June 2021 | Asia Argento | Melania Rizzoli | 648,000 | 5.2% | |
| 7 | 25 June 2021 | Matteo Renzi | Virginia Raggi | 516,000 | 4.1% | |
| 8 | 2 July 2021 | Paola Perego | Vittoria Schisano | 488,000 | 3.2% | |
| 9 | 9 July 2021 | Antonella Elia | Chiara Francini | 529,000 | 4.3% | |
| Average | | | | 518,000 | 3.61% | – |
| Cult | 16 July 2021 | "The Best of the (Fifth) Edition" | | 327,000 | 3.7% | |

=== Sixth edition ===
| Episode | Airdate | Interviewed | | | Ratings | | |
| Episode | Airdate | Interviewed | | | Viewers | Share | Ref. |
|---|---|---|---|---|---|---|---|
| 1 | 18 February 2022 | Paola Ferrari | Pamela Prati | | 438,000 | 2.88% | |
| 2 | 25 February 2022 | Morgan | Cristina Pinto | | 416,000 | 2.73% | |
| 3 | 4 March 2022 | Paola Taverna | Monica Guerritore | | 370,000 | 2.37% | |
| 4 | 11 March 2022 | Serena Grandi | Roberta Bruzzone | | 399,000 | 2.73% | |
| 5 | 18 March 2022 | Valeria Marini | Aurora Ramazzotti | | 392,000 | 3.35% | |
| 6 | 25 March 2022 | Ornella Muti | Filomena "Malena" Mastromarino | | 455,000 | 3.15% | |
| 7 | 1 April 2022 | Ilary Blasi | Irma Testa | | 463,000 | 2.96% | |
| 8 | 8 April 2022 | Donatella Rettore | Paola Barale | | 455,000 | 3.13% | |
| 9 | 22 April 2022 (Note: An interview with Elettra Lamborghini was not broadcast, resulting in an odd number of guests for the sixth edition. The last three interviews were gathered in a single episode.) | Rita Rusić | Teo Teocoli | Martina Caironi | 537,000 | 3.61% | |
| Average | | | | | 436,000 | 2.99% | – |

=== Seventh edition ===
| Episode | Airdate | Interviewed | | Ratings | | |
| Episode | Airdate | Interviewed | | Viewers | Share | Ref. |
|---|---|---|---|---|---|---|
| 1 | 1 November 2022 | Wanna Marchi | Eva Robin's | 369,000 | 5.84% | |
| 2 | 2 November 2022 | Nina Morić | Michele Bravi | 457,000 | 3.92% | |
| 3 | 3 November 2022 | Floriana Secondi | Monica Graziana Contrafatto | 169,000 | 2.47% | |
| 4 | 8 November 2022 | Alessandra Celentano | Eva Grimaldi | 373,000 | 5.82% | |
| 5 | 9 November 2022 | Vera Gemma | Alessandro Di Battista | 446,000 | 3.7% | |
| 6 | 15 November 2022 | Rocco Siffredi | Anna Foglietta | 332,000 | 5.07% | |
| 7 | 16 November 2022 | J-Ax | Annamaria Bernardini de Pace | 546,000 | 4.70% | |
| 8 | 22 November 2022 | Noemi | Nancy Brilli | 329,000 | 4.99% | |
| 9 | 23 November 2022 | Massimo Ferrero | | 620,000 | 4.60% | |
| Average | | | | 405,000 | 4.57% | – |
| Cult | 23 November 2022 | "The Best of the (Seventh) Edition" | | 438,000 | 5.18% | |

=== Eighth edition ===
| Episode | Airdate | Interviewed | | | | Ratings | | |
| Episode | Airdate | Interviewed | | | | Viewers | Share | Ref. |
|---|---|---|---|---|---|---|---|---|
| 1 | 21 February 2023 | Anna Oxa | Wanda Nara | Naike Rivelli | Ignazio La Russa | 839,000 | 4.53% | |
| 2 | 28 February 2023 | Massimo Giletti | Carolina Crescentini | | Rocco Casalino | 814,000 | 4.48% | |
| 3 | 7 March 2023 | Al Bano | Bianca Balti | | Giacomo Urtis | 1,061,000 | 5.85% | |
| 4 | 14 March 2023 | Gabriel Garko | Concita De Gregorio | | Heather Parisi | 1,062,000 | 5.45% | |
| 5 | 21 March 2023 | Ornella Vanoni | Claudio Amendola | | Claudia Pandolfi | 1,209,000 | 7.26% | |
| Average | | | | | | 997,000 | 5.51% | |

=== Ninth edition ===
| Episode | Airdate | Interviewed | | | Ratings | | |
| Episode | Airdate | Interviewed | | | Viewers | Share | Ref. |
|---|---|---|---|---|---|---|---|
| 1 | 26 September 2023 | Stefano De Martino | Arisa | Fabrizio Corona | 1,637,000 | 10.00% | |
| 2 | 3 October 2023 | Raoul Bova | Patty Pravo | Emanuele Filiberto di Savoia | 1,101,000 | 6.30% | |
| 3 | 10 October 2023 | Emma Bonino | Federico Fashion Style | Stefania Nobile | 1,235,000 | 7.71% | |
| 4 | 17 October 2023 | Ivana Spagna | Eva Riccobono | Antonio Conte | 1,036,000 | 6.06% | |
| 5 | 24 October 2023 | Isabella Ferrari | Alba Parietti | Melissa Satta | 923,000 | 5.79% | |
| Average | | | | | 1,186,000 | 7.17% | |

=== Tenth edition ===
| Episode | Airdate | Interviewed | | | Ratings | | |
| Episode | Airdate | Interviewed | | | Viewers | Share | Ref. |
|---|---|---|---|---|---|---|---|
| 1 | 2 April 2024 | Loredana Bertè | Carla Bruni | Matteo Salvini | 1,815,000 | 10.38% | |
| 2 | 9 April 2024 | Fedez | Alessandro Borghi | Francesca Cipriani | 2,213,000 | 12.55% | |
| 3 | 16 April 2024 | Marcella Bella | Simona Ventura | Ilenia Pastorelli | 1,703,000 | 9.27% | |
| 4 | 23 April 2024 | Antonella Clerici | Lory Del Santo | Margherita Buy | 1,778,000 | 10.25% | |
| 5 | 30 April 2024 | Francesca Pascale | Mara Maionchi | Piero Chiambretti | 1,981,000 | 11.61% | |
| Average | | | | | 1,898,000 | 10.81% | |

=== Eleventh edition ===
| Episode | Airdate | Interviewed | | | | Ratings | | |
| Episode | Airdate | Interviewed | | | | Viewers | Share | Ref. |
|---|---|---|---|---|---|---|---|---|
| 1 | 19 November 2024 | Mara Venier | | Riccardo Scamarcio | Flavia Vento | 1,555,000 | 9.11% | |
| 2 | 26 November 2024 | Gianmarco Tamberi | | Carmen Di Pietro | Valeria Golino | 1,216,000 | 7.06% | |
| 3 | 3 December 2024 | Sonia Bruganelli | | Elisabetta Canalis | Fabio Volo | 1,684,000 | 9.89% | |
| 4 | 10 December 2024 | Teo Mammucari (Note: Teo Mammucari left the interview after a few minutes.) | Tina Cipollari | Elena Sofia Ricci | Valeria Bruni Tedeschi | 1,817,000 | 10.62% | |
| 5 | 17 December 2024 | Jovanotti | | Taylor Mega | Vittorio Feltri | 1,909,000 | 12.19% | |
| Average | | | | | | 1,636,000 | 9.77% | |

=== Twelfth edition ===
| Episode | Airdate | Interviewed | | | | Ratings | | |
| Episode | Airdate | Interviewed | | | | Viewers | Share | Ref. |
|---|---|---|---|---|---|---|---|---|
| 1 | 29 April 2025 | Sabrina Impacciatore | | Marcell Jacobs | Nathalie Guetta | 1,478,000 | 9.10% | |
| 2 | 6 May 2025 | Alessandro Preziosi | | Paola Iezzi | Milly D'Abbraccio | 1,204,000 | 6.40% | |
| 3 | 20 May 2025 | Michele Morrone | Benedetta Rossi | Raz Degan | Floriana Secondi | 1,412,000 | 9.90% | |
| 4 | 27 May 2025 | Mario Balotelli | | Lunetta Savino | Massimo Ferrero | 1,592,000 | 10.10% | |
| 5 | 3 June 2025 | Bianca Balti | | Guè | Lucrezia Lante della Rovere | 1,468,000 | 9.70% | |
| Average | | | | | | 1,431,000 | 9.04% | |

=== Thirteenth edition ===
| Episode | Airdate | Interviewed | | | | Ratings | | |
| Episode | Airdate | Interviewed | | | | Viewers | Share | Ref. |
|---|---|---|---|---|---|---|---|---|
| 1 | 28 October 2025 | Belén Rodríguez | Isabella Rossellini | | Rita De Crescenzo | 1,748,000 | 12,90% | |
| 2 | 4 November 2025 | Iva Zanicchi | Adriano Pappalardo | | Irene Pivetti | 1,367,000 | 9,00% | |
| 3 | 18 November 2025 | Cristiano Malgioglio | Eva Herzigova | Genny Urtis | BigMama | 1,262,000 | 8,40% | |
| 4 | 25 November 2025 | Orietta Berti | Martina Colombari | | Filippo Magnini | 1,176,000 | 7,40% | |
| 5 | 2 December 2025 | Stefania Sandrelli | Sabrina Salerno | Fabio Fognini | Maria De Filippi | 1,390,000 | 8,90% | |
| Average | | | | | | 1,388,000 | 9,32% | |

=== Fourteenth edition ===
| Episode | Airdate | Interviewed | | | Ratings | | |
| Episode | Airdate | Interviewed | | | Viewers | Share | Ref. |
|---|---|---|---|---|---|---|---|
| 1 | 7 April 2026 | Amanda Lear | Micaela Ramazzotti | Zeudi Di Palma | 1,349,000 | 8,80% | |
| 2 | 14 April 2026 | Carlo Conti | Giulia Michelini | Francesco Chiofalo | 1,280,000 | 8,60% | |
| 3 | 21 April 2026 | Brigitte Nielsen | Elettra Lamborghini | Shiva | 1,761,000 | 11,40% | |
| 4 | 28 April 2026 | Romina Power | Elena Santarelli | Sal Da Vinci | | | |
| Average | | | | | 1,463,000 | 9,60% | |

== Broadcast ==
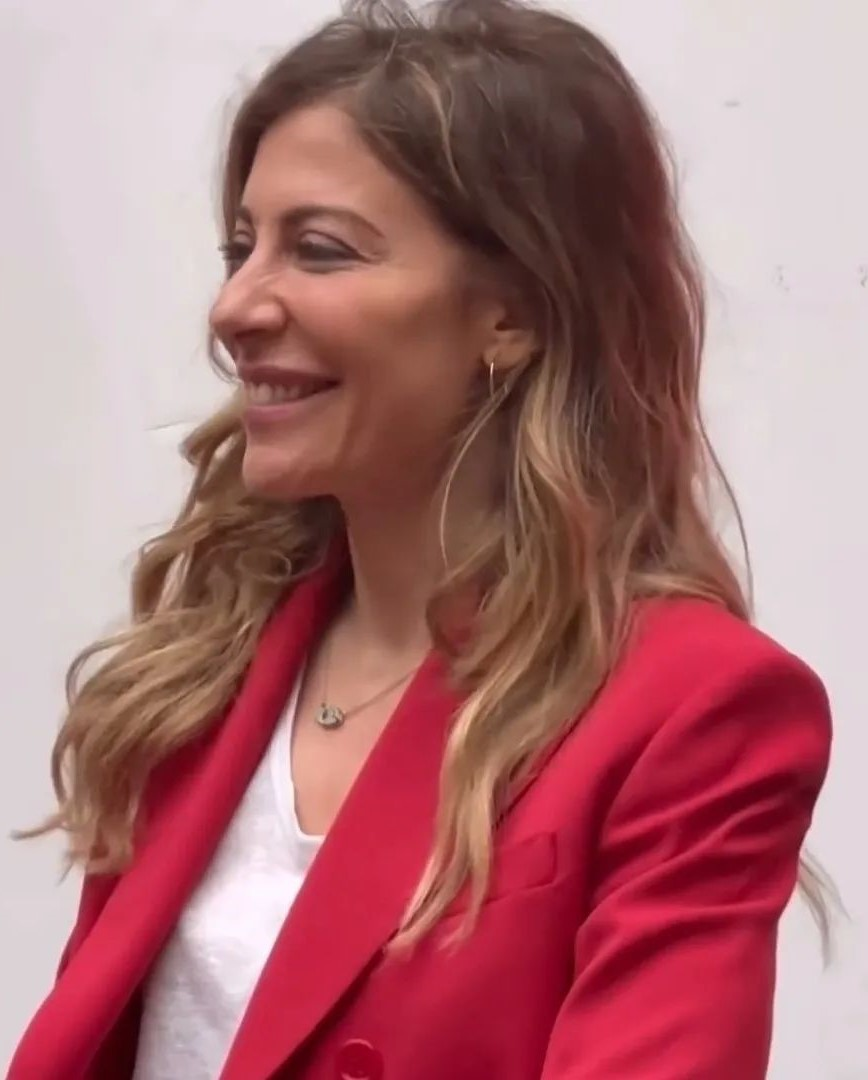
Italian journalist Francesca Fagnani has hosted Belve since its debut in 2018.

Belve debuted in Italy on Nove on 14 March 2018. The show was produced by Loft Produzioni, and aired until 21 June 2019. The program was revived on Rai 2 on 14 May 2021, produced by RAI, with Fremantle Italia sharing production as of 2023.

== Reception ==
Marzia Apice of ANSA described Fagnani's driving style as "ironic and biting", and wrote that it is "difficult to sit on Belve's stool, and not only because it is uncomfortable, but because you have to accept an interview that is a kind of tug-of-war". Il Messaggero described Belve as the most feared seat on Italian television, as Fagnani does not take it easy on anyone. Andrea Parrella of Fanpage.it described Belve as "the television translation of the most successful format of the moment: the podcast", allowing Fagnani to "gossip without getting [her] hands dirty." Mario Manca of Vanity Fair Italia complimented Fagnani's "biting but very elegant style", and Beatrice Dondi of L'Espresso called Fagnani "very incisive", with the ability to give "few concessions to sentimentality and real attention to questions".

In her podcast, Selvaggia Lucarelli called Belve "overrated", and suggested that Fagnani is more interested in the show making news and generating sound bites than producing a program that is "enjoyable in its entirety". Lucarelli added, "It's a formula designed to enhance the personality of the interviewer: you go there to make the host win."

== Belve Crime ==
A spin-off series, Belve Crime, debuted on 10 June 2025. It focuses on figures from crime news, a subject Fagnani has covered since the beginning of her career as a journalist.

=== Overview ===
| Edition | Host | Release | | Episodes | Studio | Broadcast | | Director |
| Edition | Host | Start | End | Episodes | Studio | Network | Streaming | Director |
|---|---|---|---|---|---|---|---|---|
| 1 | Francesca Fagnani | 10 June 2025 | In progress | 1 | Studi televisivi Fabrizio Frizzi, Studio 3 | Rai 2 | RaiPlay | Mauro Stancati |

=== Edition 1 ===
| Episode | Airdate | Interviewed | | | Ratings | | |
| Episode | Airdate | Interviewed | | | Viewers | Share | Ref. |
|---|---|---|---|---|---|---|---|
| 1 | 10 June 2025 | Tamara Ianni (Note: Tamara Ianni testified against the Spada crime family of Ostia.) | Massimo Bossetti | Eva Mikula | 1,570,000 | 12.40% | |
