= Bernard Guetta =

French politician and journalist (born 1951)

Bernard Guetta MEP
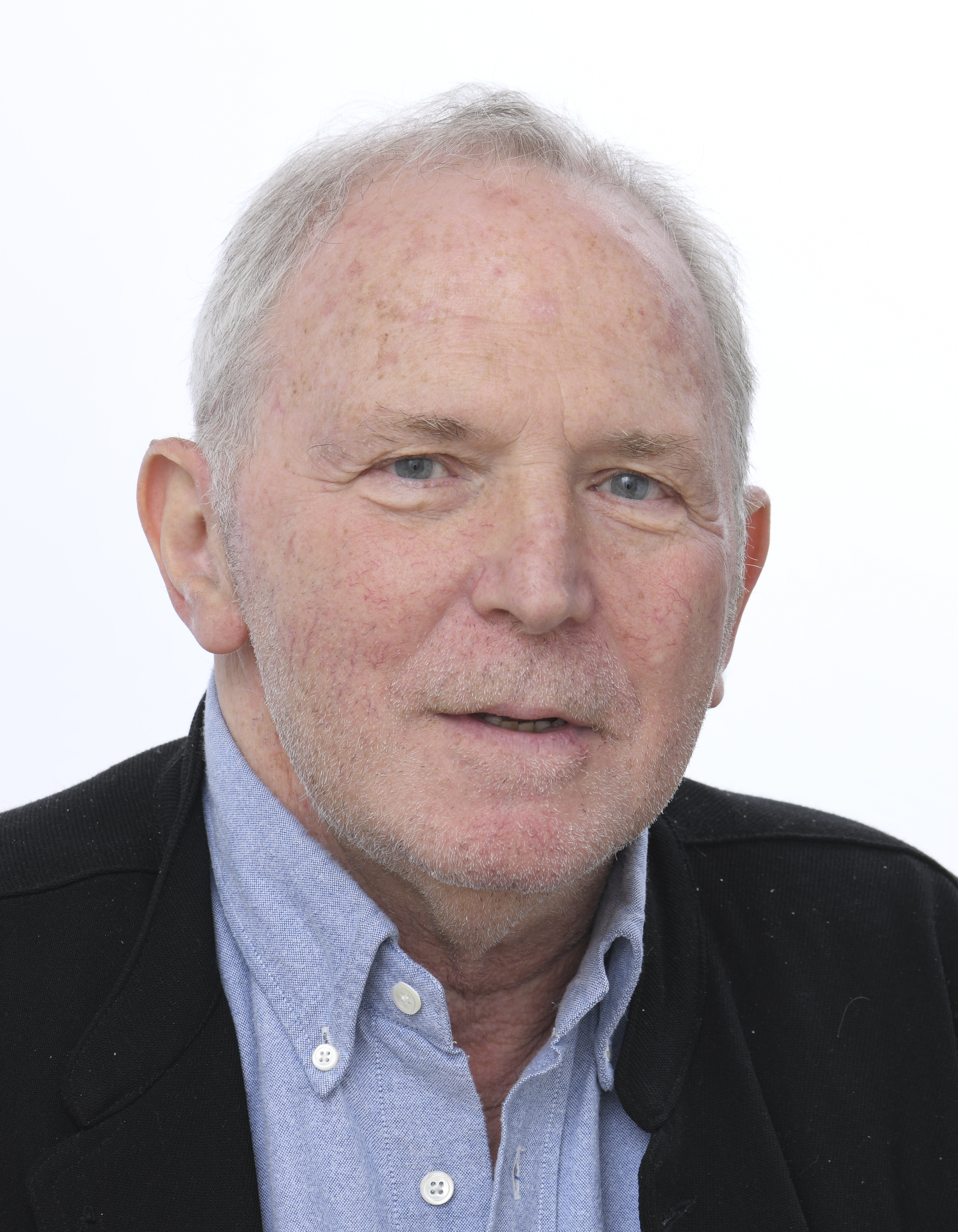

Member of the European Parliament
- Incumbent
- Assumed office 2 July 2019
- Constituency: France

Personal details
- Born: 28 January 1951 (age 75) Boulogne-Billancourt, France
- Party: Independent; Renew Europe
- Spouse: Catherine Sayegh
- Relations: David Guetta (half-brother)
- Children: 2
- Education: Centre de formation des journalistes (Paris)
- Occupation: Politician, journalist

Bernard Guetta (/ˈɡɛtə/ GHET-ə; French: [bɛʁnaʁ ɡeta]; born 28 January 1951) is a French politician and journalist who was elected a Member of the European Parliament (MEP) in 2019 and re-elected in 2024. As an MEP he sits with Renew Europe.

== Career ==
He was born in Boulogne-Billancourt to Pierre Guetta, a Franco-Italian sociologist from a Moroccan Jewish family, and his first wife, Ines Francine Bourla, a gallerist of tribal art. His sister Nathalie Guetta, is an actress active in Italy. From his father's side, Guetta is the half-brother of DJ and record producer David Guetta.

In addition to his committee assignments, Guetta is part of the Spinelli Group, the European Parliament Intergroup on Seas, Rivers, Islands and Coastal Areas and the MEPs Against Cancer group.

== Bibliography ==
- Patron Mai, Le Seuil, 1975
- Éloge de la Tortue, Le Monde, Actualités, 1991 ISBN 2878990285
- Pologne, with Philippe Barbey, Arthaud 1992 ISBN 2700304020
- Géopolitique, L'Olivier, 1995 ISBN 2-87929-089-9
- L'Europe fédérale, with Philippe Labarde, Grasset, 2002 ISBN 2-246-62981-0
- Le Monde est mon métier : Le journaliste, les pouvoirs et la vérité, with Jean Lacouture, Grasset, 2007, ISBN 2-246-72901-7
- Michel Rocard, Alain Juppé with Bernard Guetta, La Politique, telle qu'elle meurt de ne pas être, JCLattès, 2011 ISBN 978-2-7096-3577-6, 2nd edition (paperback), J'ai lu, 2012 ISBN 978-2-290-03763-8
- L'an I des révolutions arabes : décembre 2010-janvier 2012, Belin, 2012 ISBN 2-701-16295-5
- Intime Conviction. Comment je suis devenu européen, Le Seuil, 2014 ISBN 978-2-02-114349-2
- Dans l'ivresse de l'histoire, Flammarion, 2017 ISBN 978-2-08-140904-0, 2nd edition (paperback), J'ai lu, 2018 ISBN 978-2-290-16351-1
- L'Enquête hongroise (puis polonaise, italienne et autrichienne), Flammarion, 2019 ISBN 978-2-08-145264-0, 2nd edition (paperback), J'ai lu, 2020 ISBN 978-2-290-22074-0
