= Almerigo Grilz =

Italian politician (1953–1987)

Almerigo Grilz (11 March 1953 – 19 May 1987) was an Italian right wing politician and an independent war correspondent.

He was born in Trieste, then Zone A of the Free Territory of Trieste, now part of the region of Friuli-Venezia Giulia, Italy. His last name is of Slovenian origin. During his youth, he was a leader of the nationalist right wing Youth Front (Fronte della gioventù) and then of the Italian Social Movement – National Right of Trieste. He was also a member of the City Council of Trieste. In 1977, Almerigo Grilz was the leader of the Trieste section of the Youth Front, becoming the Deputy National Secretary by a direct appointment of then secretary Gianfranco Fini. During this time he was also a member of the Journalist order of Trieste and cooperated with the Dissenso, the official journal of the Youth Front.

== Politician and war journalist ==
As a teenager, he showed a considerable ability as a photographer and sketcher. He was also an avid reader, particularly enjoying war stories and comics in general. During this time, he liked to walk around the city, taking photographs and making short films about its everyday life. It has been reported that his political passion started one day during one of his early reportages, when he was around with his camera taking pictures of a demonstration. When the police charged the demonstrators, he was forced to run, seeking refuge inside the MSI seat of Trieste, in Via Paduina. More work was to come for him in the late sixties. Following the reorganization of the Italian dockyard system, the C.I.P.E, or (Commissione Interministeriale per la Programmazione Economica) (Economical Planning Interdepartmental Committee) decided the grouping of the Cantieri Riuniti Adriatico of Trieste and Monfalcone ("United Shipbuilders of the Adriatic") into one company, and set its new headquarters in Genoa. On 8 October 1966 the grouping plan was implemented and as expected the local population reacted. Shipbuilding had been one of the city's prominent industries since the Austrian period. Many Triestini had made their living working at the dockyards. This ignited a demonstration against the dockyard grouping and the consequent loss of jobs. During those days Grilz was again on the streets taking pictures of the demonstration. The protests of 1968 comprised a worldwide escalation of social conflicts, including in Italy, where he documented the social disorder and demonstrations. In 1970 he founded the "Centro Nazionale Audiovisivo", an amateur documentary center. After earning a degree in law, he started travelling. He was attracted by northern countries, where he profusely travelled by every means. He loved the order and the northern countries’ vision of life and society. In those years he visited Denmark and Scandinavia; however he was particularly attracted by London and Britain. He learnt English very quickly, soon becoming fluent, and deeply loved British people. His passion for Britain can also be seen in many of his early sketches, where he depicted war scenes of Tommies defeating Nazis. On 29 April 1981 he documented Charles and Diana’s wedding. [1] In the mid-1980s he became a full-time freelance war journalist, resigning his seat in the Trieste City Council. His job kept him away from home for 10 months a year. He witnessed all the conflicts from the mid-1970s, from the Soviet occupation of Afghanistan to the Israeli operation in Lebanon; the conflicts between Druses and Christian Maronites; and the Myanmar-Thailand border war between Keren minority and Myanmar regulars. His reportages were sold all over the world and bought by CBS, France 3 and NBC. These important networks would subsequently hire Grilz as a correspondent in other parts of the world. At NBC’s direct request Grilz followed the Communist Philippine Guerrilla and the elections that led to the fall of the late Philippines dictator Ferdinand Marcos and the subsequent election of Corazon Aquino.

== The Albatros press agency ==
In 1983, together with Gian Micalessin and Fausto Biloslavo, Grilz founded the "Albatros Press Agency". This agency would produce reportages, documentaries and articles from parts of the world where revolutions and wars were fought. The agency mainly sold its productions to foreign television networks, in particular in the United States and the United Kingdom. In Italy Albatros managed to sell its products to important national media, such as the Panorama weekly magazine and TG1, the flagship television newscast of Rai 1, the leading Italian Television Channel. This despite the prevalent prejudice in most of the Italian cultural and media environment against those who were considered culturally close to the MSI-DN right-wing party.

== Death ==
On 19 May 1987 in Mozambique, while witnessing a battle between “Renamo’s” militiamen and the regular Army, Grilz was struck by a stray bullet in the head. His body was never recovered and buried close to where he was killed by, an English free-lance reporter. The news of Almerigo Grilz's death, due to his proximity to fascist ideology, did not echo loudly in the Italian press world. Only in the late 1990s would he be listed as an Italian press agent fallen in a war zone. The communist newspaper “Unità” wrote of the death of a “mercenary” when reporting Grilz's death. An exception was Tg Uno which, thanks to Paolo Frajese, remembered Grilz even against the opinion of directors; Renato Farina, a writer for the weekly magazine “Il Sabato”, and Ettore Mo, also a special correspondent in the hot spots for the major Italian newspaper “Corriere della Sera” and a fellow journalist who went to various world hot spots, remembered the death and life of Almerigo Grilz. The name of Almerigo Grilz has been immortalized on the Reporters sans frontières monument in Normandy, dedicated to all the fallen war journalists. The city of Trieste has named a street in his honor.

== Micalessin documentary on Grilz's death ==
In 2002 Micalessin, a co-founder with Grilz of the Press Agency Albatros, longed to see the place where Grilz lived his last moments. Being also keen to know the whereabouts of his remains, he made a television documentary in which he included the last scenes shot by Grilz just before his death.
