= La Verità =

Italian newspaper

- Quid est veritas?
- Type: Daily newspaper
- Format: Berliner
- Owner: La Verità srl
- Founder: Maurizio Belpietro
- Editor: Maurizio Belpietro
- Deputy editor: Francesco Borgonovo
- Founded: 20 September 2016
- Political alignment: National conservatism Social conservatism
- Language: Italian
- Headquarters: Piazza della Repubblica 21, Milan, Italy
- Circulation: 39,000 (as of 2019)
- Website: https://www.laverita.info/

La Verità (English: "The Truth") is a daily newspaper based in the city of Milan, Italy. The newspaper is conservative in outlook and often offers Catholic-inspired views, albeit being somewhat critical of Pope Francis. Since its foundation in 2016, it has been edited by Maurizio Belpietro, who previously acted in that capacity both at il Giornale and Libero.

== Controversy ==
The chief editor Maurizio Belpietro was sued by NGO's Open Arms, Emergency, Sea-Watch, SOS Méditerranée, Mediterranea and the Rete Nazionale AOI for breach of his supervisory duty, after a headline of the weekly panorama paper had addressed them as "The new Pirates" in 2022. A court in Milan found him guilty in late 2025 and ordered him to pay damages to the migrant rescuing organisations.

== See also ==
- List of newspapers in Italy
