= Studio Aperto =

- Logo since 29 November 2021
- Starring: See Presenters
- Country of origin: Italy
- Original language: Italian

Production
- Running time: 30 mins.

Original release
- Network: Italia 1 TGcom24 (simulcast)
- Release: 26 November 1989 – present

Studio Aperto (lit. Open Studio) is the brand for Italian TV channel of Mediaset network Italia 1's news programmes. Founded by Emilio Fede on 16 January 1991 with the beginning of the Gulf War, it is shown domestically on Italia 1. Created by the editors of NewsMediaset, it is directed by Andrea Pucci, as editor-in-chief of NewsMediaset, assisted by Anna Broggiato as co-director.

== Background ==
From 1982 until 1989, Italia 1 did not have television news because it was a channel dedicated to young people. However, from the end of November 1989, Italia 1 Speciale News was broadcast on the channel.

The programme is generally presented by a single newsreader. Most items will be made up of reports and are generally preceded and followed by the correspondent reporting live from the scene of the report.

== Daily programme and presenters ==
- 12:20: Presentres Program On Italia 1
- 18:00: Laura Piva
- 18:35: Giulia Ronchi
- Both editions: Irene Tarantelli
- 21:25: Stefania Cavallaro, Sabrina Pieragostini, Patrizia Caregnato, Monica Gasparini, Laura Piva, Giulia Ronch.
- 01:30: Francesca Ambrosini, Maria Vittoria Corà, Eleonora Rossi Castelli, Elisa Triani, Stefania Cavallaro

== Daily programme and presenters in January 1995 ==
- 12:25: Stefania Cavallaro, Sabrina Pieragostini, Patrizia Caregnato, Monica Gasparini, Laura Piva.
- 18:30: Francesca Ambrosini, Maria Vittoria Corà, Eleonora Rossi Castelli, Elisa Triani.
- Both editions: Giulia Ronchi, Irene Tarantelli.
- 00:30: Laura Piva, Giulia Ronchi
- 02:30: Presentres Program On Italia 1.

== Criticism and controversy ==
Studio Aperto has long been accused of promoting right-wing positions, due to the ownership by Silvio Berlusconi. Other criticism are about its extensive airing of crime news and soft news (gossip, animals and videos from the Web) subtracting time to more important news.

== Editor-in-chief ==
- 1991–1993: Emilio Fede
- 1993: Vittorio Corona
- 1993–2000: Paolo Liguori
- 2000–2007: Mario Giordano
- 2007–2009: Giorgio Mulè
- 2009–2010: Mario Giordano
- 2010–2014: Giovanni Toti
- 2014–present: Anna Broggiato
