= Panorama (magazine) =

Italian-language news magazine

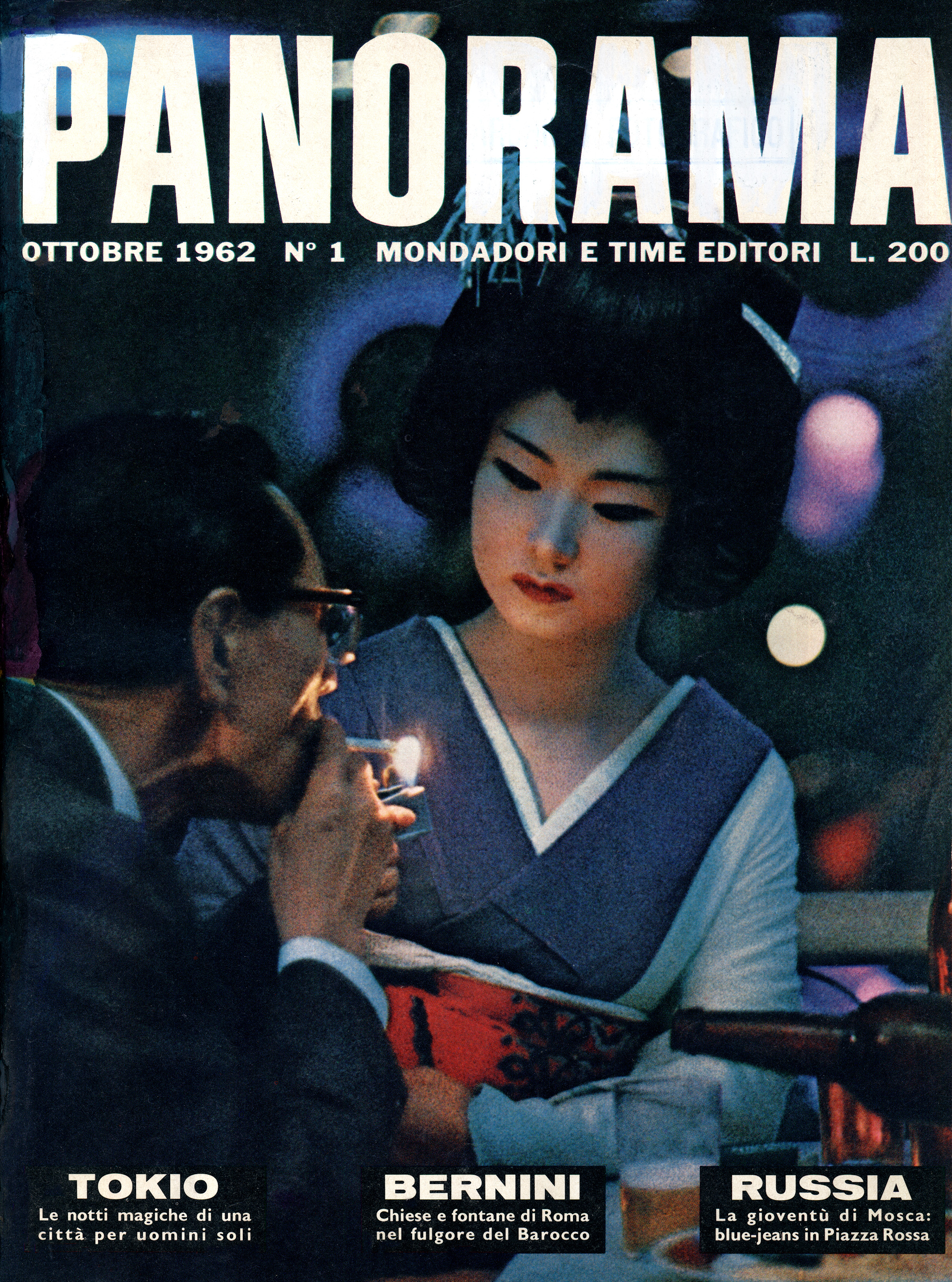
- October 1962 edition
- Former editors: Ezio Mauro
- Categories: News magazine
- Frequency: Weekly
- Circulation: 80,318 (May 2021)
- Publisher: La Verità Srl
- First issue: 27 April 1939; 87 years ago
- Company: Panorama S.r.l (La Verità Group)
- Country: Italy
- Based in: Milan
- Language: Italian
- Website: panorama.it
- ISSN: 0553-1098

Panorama is a weekly news magazine based in the city of Milan, Italy.

== History and overview ==
Panorama was founded in Milan in 1939. The magazine was temporarily closed by the Fascist rule in December 1940 due to the publication of the translated texts by Ada Prospero. It was relaunched by Italian publisher Arnoldo Mondadori in cooperation with the American Time Inc. group in Milan in October 1962.

The magazine came out biweekly in the initial period.

== Ownership ==
The magazine is owned and published by La Verità Srl, having bought it in 2018 from Arnoldo Mondadori Editore, the largest Italian publishing house. Mondadori is controlled by Fininvest, a financial holding company controlled by the family of Silvio Berlusconi, a former Prime Minister of Italy. Although American group Time-Life company also owned the magazine, later it left the magazine due to low circulation levels.

== Circulation ==
Panorama had a circulation of 350,429 copies in 1984. The circulation of the magazine was 530,031 copies between September 1993 and August 1994. In 2000 it rose to 566,000 copies. The 2003 circulation of the weekly was 525,000 copies. Its circulation was 514,000 copies in 2004. It was the third best-selling news magazine in Italy in 2007 with a circulation of 479,297 copies. The circulation of the magazine was 511,349 copies in 2010. The magazine had a circulation of 303,422 copies in June 2013. The magazine had a circulation of 80,318 copies and sold 47,425 copies in May 2021.

== Management and staff ==
Maurizio Belpietro is the magazine's director, succeeding Giorgio Mulé and Pietro Calabrese. A former director of the magazine, Carlo Rossella, became a director of Medusa Film.

=== Contributors ===
Adolfo Battaglia, a veteran journalist and politician, is among the former contributors of Panorama.

The current contributors of Panorama include:

- Maurizio Belpietro
- Mario Giordano
- Marcello Veneziani
- Giacomo Amadori
- Fausto Biloslavo
- Vittorio Sgarbi
- Lorenzo del Boca
- Fabio Amendolara
- Daniela Mattalia
- Francesco Borgonovo
- Giorgio Sturlese Tosi
- Luca Sciortino
- Carlo Puca
- Luca Telese
- Antonio Rossitto
- Marco Morello
- Marianna Baroli
- Guido Castellano
- Francesco Canino
- Guido Fontanelli

== See also ==
- List of newspapers in Italy

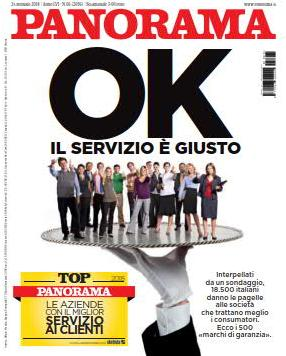
January 2018 Panorama cover, Mondadori

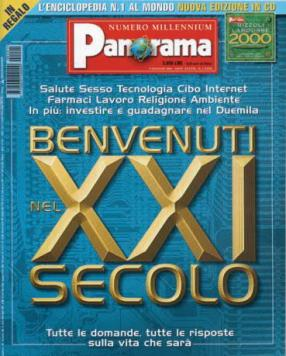
2004 Panorama cover, Mondadori
