= Francesca Fagnani =

Italian journalist and TV presenter

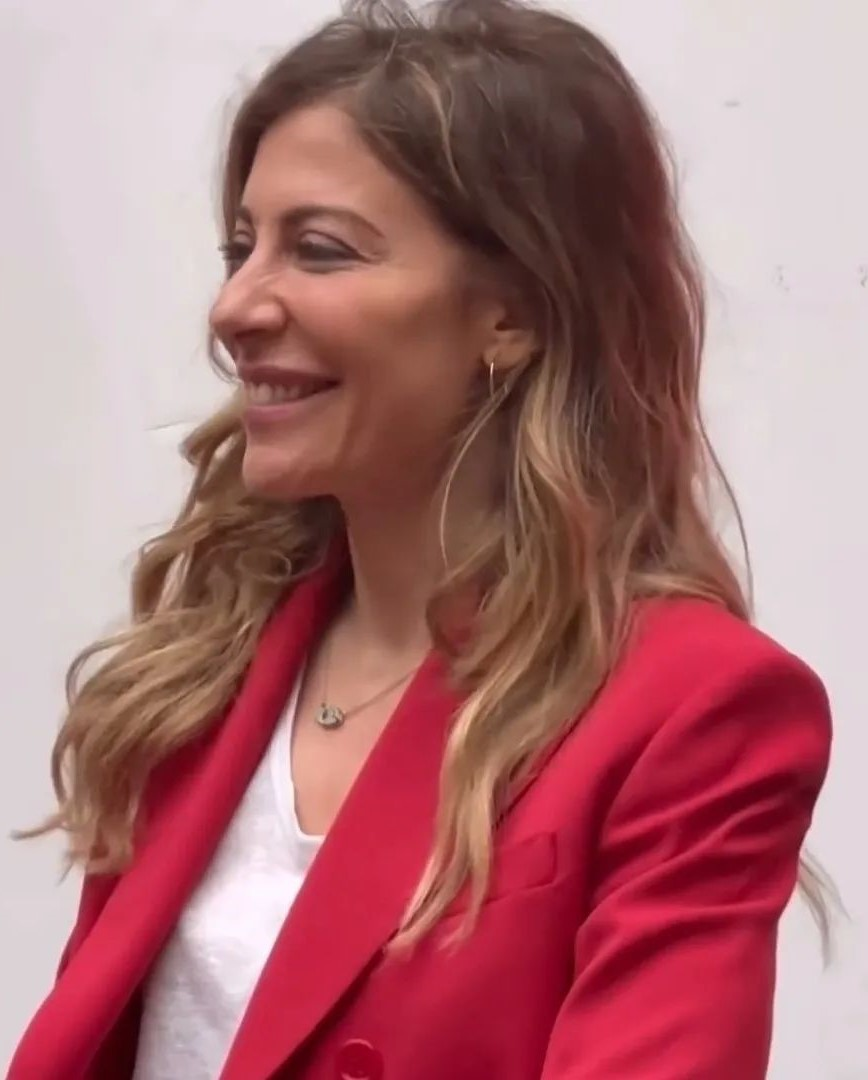
- Francesca Fagnani in 2023
- Born: 25 November 1976 (age 49); Rome, Italy
- Education: Sapienza University of Rome; New York University
- Occupations: Journalist; writer; television presenter
- Years active: 2006–present
- Known for: Belve
- Partner: Enrico Mentana (2013–present)

Francesca Fagnani (born 25 November 1976) is an Italian journalist, writer and television presenter. She started her career as an investigative journalist against the Italian mafia and organized crime. She was later involved in various reportages about Italian youth detention centers. Since 2018 she hosts the Italian interview program Belve and its spin-off, Belve Crime, both in which she serves also as co-creator and co-writer.

== Early life ==
Francesca Fagnani was born in Rome, Italy, on 25 November 1976, to a family from Cagnano Amiterno, Abruzzo. She has a fraternal twin sister.

Fagnani graduated from the Sapienza University of Rome with a degree in modern literature. She obtained a doctorate in Dante philology from New York University, and was in New York City to witness the September 11 attacks in 2001.

== Career ==
Fagnani subsequently volunteered to work at RAI's New York office, where she did an internship with journalist Giovanni Floris before returning to Italy. In Rome, she worked with journalist Giovanni Minoli, before making her debut as an investigative journalist on Michele Santoro's television program AnnoZero in 2006. She stayed there until 2010. From 2013 to 2020, Fagnani wrote for Il Fatto Quotidiano and La Repubblica, and focused mainly on covering organized crime. Since March 2018, she has been the host of the Italian television interview series Belve, which consists of face-to-face interviews between Fagnani and "beasts", strong personalities from the world of entertainment, politics or news. Belve Crime, a spin-off series hosted by Fagnani and focused on figures from crime news, debuted in June 2025.

Fagnani co-hosted the Sanremo Music Festival 2023.

== Personal life ==
Since 2013, Fagnani has been romantically linked to journalist Enrico Mentana.

== Media appearances ==
=== Fiction ===
Year	Title	Role	Notes
2025	Vita da Carlo	Herself	Episode: "L'invidia è una brutta belva"

=== Non-fiction ===
Year	Title	Role	Notes
2006–2010	AnnoZero	Reporter	Political talk show (seasons 1-4)
2018–present	Belve	Host	Interview show; also co-creator and co-writer
2018	Il prezzo	Host	Investigative program; also creator and co-writer
2019–2020	Quarta Repubblica	Opinionist	Political talk show (season 2)
2020–2023	Non è l'Arena	Opinionist	Political talk show (seasons 3-6)
2021	Le Iene	Guest host	Investigation program (season 25)
2023	Sanremo Music Festival 2023	Co-host	Annual music festival, co-host for the 2nd night
2023	Italia Loves Romagna: The Concert	Co-host	Concert special
2024	Cena di Natale	Reporter	Variety special
2025	Belve Crime	Host	Spin-off and crime version of Belve; also co-creator and co-writer
2026	Sanremo Music Festival 2026	Guest performer	Annual music festival, performed "Parole parole" with Fulminacci in the duets night
