= Ida Magli =

Italian anthropologist and philosopher (1925 –2016)

Ida Magli (5 January 1925 – 21 February 2016) was an Italian cultural anthropologist, philosopher, feminist, essayist, and journalist. She applied anthropological methods in her research works on Italian and European societies. She also studied women's history by identifying the roots of male domination on women. During the last years of her life, she took critical positions against the unification of Europe.

== Life and career ==
Ida Magli was born in Rome, Italy, on 5 January 1925. She obtained a diploma in piano from the Santa Cecilia Conservatory. She later graduated in philosophy from the Sapienza University of Rome with a specialization in medical psychology. She also wrote her experimental thesis on language radio.

She became a professor of social psychology at the University of Siena and subsequently of cultural anthropology at the Sapienza University of Rome, a position she held until her retirement in 1988.

In 2015, to recognize her literary contributions, she was awarded with the Vittoriale prize.

She died in Rome on 21 February 2016.

== Anthropological works ==
Her anthropological studies were mainly focused on the sphere of the sacred and the feminine conditions in light of the works of anthropologists such as Alfred Kroeber and Franz Boas.

=== Male oppression of women ===
Using anthropological methods, she studied the historical context of exercising the male power over women through identifying the roots of the need for male oppression on several issues related sexuality and women reproductive capabilities. Some of her publications focused on these which include The woman, an open problem (1974), Matriarchy and the power of women (1978), The female of man (1982), Male sexuality (1989) and On the dignity of women (1993).

=== Religious anthropology ===
Her studies on religious anthropology were considered to be "innovative, supported by a secular and provocative thought that explored the key areas of the sacred." Some of her research works focused on these which include Jesus of Nazareth (1982; Premio Brancati 1982), The Madonna (1987), Santa Teresa di Lisieux – A Romantic Girl of the Nineteenth Century (1994), Secular History of Religious Women (1995) and Ophelia's Mill: Men and Gods (2007).

=== Against the unification of Europe ===
She opposed a united Europe and took critical position on the unification of Europe through her publications such as that who didn't tell you about Maastricht (1997), The European Dictatorship (2010), After the West (2012) and Defending Italy (2013).

== Journalism ==
Along with her academic and research works, she actively involved in the journalistic sector. For years, she regularly wrote articles in the newspapers la Repubblica, L'Espresso and Il Giornale. In 1976, she cofounded the international journal of anthropological studies on women, DWF donnawomanfemme and became its director. This was the first Italian journal dedicated to studies of feminist historical and socio-anthropological issues. From 1989 to 1992, she also served as a director of the Journal of Cultural Anthropology.
