= Collegio San Giuseppe - Istituto De Merode =

Catholic school in Rome, Italy

Coordinates: 41.9073°N 12.4819°E

The Collegio S. Giuseppe-Istituto de Mérode is a Catholic school of the Brothers of the Christian Schools. It is located in Rome, Italy, in via San Sebastianello 1, at the corner of Piazza di Spagna, in the rione Campo Marzio. It comprises two buildings, the Collegio S. Giuseppe (that occupies the ancient Albergo Serny) and the Istituto de Mérode (built in 1900). It includes a primary school, middle school and high school (Liceo Classico and Scientifico).

The private institute is recognized for its high tuition fees, notable location and distinguished alumni network. In addition, it is widely regarded as one of the most prestigious educational institutions in Italy.

== History ==
The congregation of the Brothers of the Christian Schools was founded by Jean-Baptiste de La Salle in the 17th century. The Collegio S. Giuseppe was founded in 1850 as the "Ecole Française", having its seat in Palazzo Poli at the Trevi Fountain. It was relocated to its current location between Via Alibert and Via San Sebastianello near Piazza di Spagna in 1885.

The Istituto de Mérode was founded in 1871 by Mons. Xavier de Mérode at Palazzo Altemps; it was moved to the current location in 1903.

The two institutes were joined in 1929.

Roman dialect poet Carlo Alberto Salustri, known as Trilussa, was a pupil of the school from 1880 to 1886, first in the original location of Palazzo Poli at the Trevi Fountain and then at the current location of piazza di Spagna. Trilussa remained close to the school and its alumni community.

In 1938, in the basketball court of the institute, the basketball team Stella Azzurra Roma was born, after an idea of brother Mario Grottanelli.

Following the deportation of Jews by German troops on 16 October 1943, the institute, like other Roman Catholic schools, hid numerous Jewish children and adults among its students and Brothers. In recognition of his role, the then rector, Sigismondo Ugo Barbaro, has been included among the Righteous Among the Nations on 10 May 2017.

In 1958 the institute was decorated by the President of the Italian Republic Giovanni Gronchi with the Italian honor Medaglia d'oro ai benemeriti della cultura (gold medal for cultural merits).

== Notable alumni ==
- Carlo Alberto Salustri, Trilussa (dialect poet): from 1880 to 1886
- Pio Filippani Ronconi (orientalist): graduated in 1939
- Pietro Calabrese (sports journalist): graduated in 1963
- Giovanni Malagò (businessman and sports personality) in 1978
- Daniele Capezzone (politician): graduated in 1991
- Noemi (singer): graduated in 2001
