= Il Giornale =

Italian newspaper

il Giornale

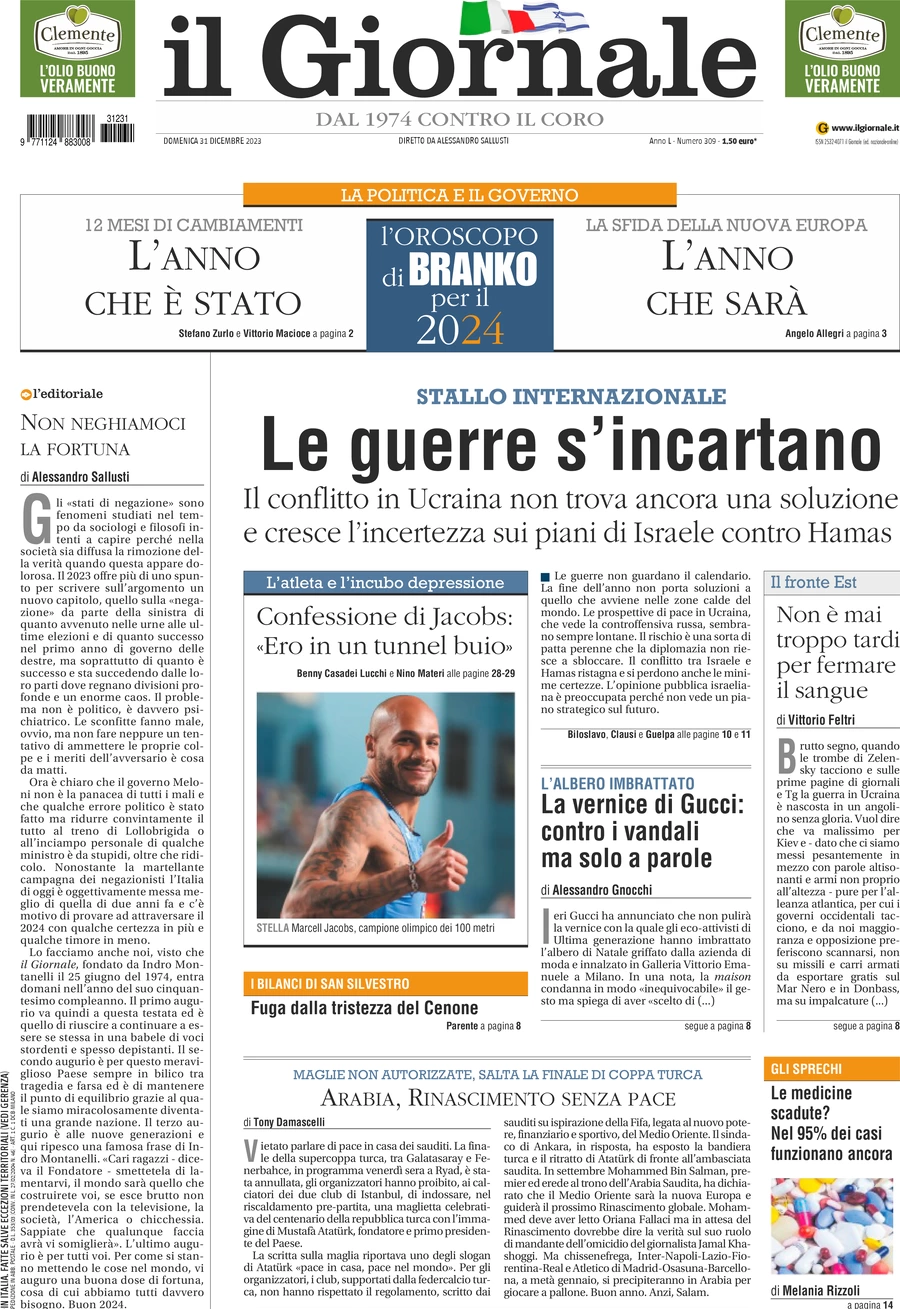
- Front page, 31 December 2023
- Type: Daily newspaper
- Format: Tabloid
- Owner: Antonio Angelucci (via investment vehicles)
- Founder: Indro Montanelli
- Publisher: Società Europea di Edizioni
- Editor: Vittorio Feltri; Alessandro Sallusti
- Founded: 1974; 52 years ago
- Political alignment: Liberal conservatism Pro-centre-right (since 1994)
- Language: Italian
- Headquarters: Via dell'Aprica 18, Milan, Italy
- Circulation: 34,891 (November 2021)
- ISSN: 1124-8831
- Website: www.ilgiornale.it

il Giornale (English: "the Newspaper"), known from its founding in 1974 until 1983 as il Giornale nuovo (English: "the new Newspaper"), is an Italian-language daily newspaper published in Milan with an average circulation of 28,933 in May 2023. In 2006, it was considered one of Italy's main national newspapers.

== History and profile ==
The newspaper was founded in 1974 by the journalist Indro Montanelli, together with the colleagues Enzo Bettiza, Ferenc Fejtő, Raymond Aron, and others, after some disagreements with the new pro-left-wing editorial line adopted by the newspaper Corriere della Sera, where Montanelli had been one of the most important contributors. Montanelli left Corriere della Sera in 1973. The newspaper was first published on 25 June 1974 as il Giornale nuovo, with Montanelli as editor and member of the publishing company board of directors, which included an editorial office composed of 59 journalists. The paper holds conservative and right-wing stances. The paper's headquarters is in Milan.

In 1977, Montanelli, who was in financial difficulties, accepted an offer by Silvio Berlusconi, who became the new owner. In 1983, the paper was renamed as il Giornale. When Berlusconi entered politics in December 1993, Montanelli left fearing for his own independence, and went on to found the short-lived daily newspaper La Voce. In 1992, Berlusconi left the role of the owner of il Giornale to his brother, Paolo Berlusconi. Vittorio Feltri replaced Montanelli as editor. As of 2003, the publisher of the newspaper, Società Europea di Edizioni, was owned by Paolo Berlusconi (58.3%) and Arnoldo Mondadori Editore (41.7% directly and indirectly). Until May 2005, the paper was published in broadsheet format, when it switched to tabloid format. In May 2005, il Giornale also started its online version. In 2007, the monthly business magazine Espansione became a supplement of the paper. As of 2016, Società Europea di Edizioni was still partially owned by Arnoldo Mondadori Editore directly for 36.90%, which is a listed company that majority owned by Fininvest. It was reported that by Roberto Amodei, the owner of several sports newspaper of Italy, had interested to subscribe the capital increase of Società Europea di Edizioni.

The Berlusconi family sold il Giornale to Antonio Angelucci (who also owns Libero and Il Tempo) in September 2023.

== Circulation ==
In 1997, il Giornale was the seventh best-selling Italian newspaper, with a circulation of 218,741 copies. The paper had a circulation of 235,000 copies in 2000. The circulation of the paper was 228,198 copies in 2001, and it was 219,363 copies in 2002. The circulation of the paper was 216,000 copies in 2003, and 208,407 copies in 2004. In 2008, the paper had an average circulation of 192,667 copies. The circulation of the paper was 184,882 copies in 2009 and 183,923 copies in 2010. In 2012, il Giornale sold 79,125,210 copies. By 2015, the circulation of the paper was about 68,000 copies.

=== il Giornale della Libertà ===
il Giornale della Libertà was a free weekly political, headed by Michela Vittoria Brambilla, and attached to il Giornale. It was severely criticized by its editorial staff, who later went on strike, which was the second time after the departure of Montanelli. The last issue was published in May 2008.

== Editors ==
- Indro Montanelli (1974–1994)
- Vittorio Feltri (1994–1997)
- Mario Cervi (1997–2000)
- Maurizio Belpietro (2000–2007)
- Mario Giordano (2007–2009)
- Vittorio Feltri (2009–2010)
- Alessandro Sallusti (2010–2021)
- Augusto Minzolini (2021–2023)
- Alessandro Sallusti (2023-today)

== Directors ==
- Indro Montanelli (25 June 1974 – 11 January 1994)
- Enzo Bettiza (25 June 1974 – 1983), co-director
- Gian Galeazzo Biazzi Vergani (1983–1991), co-director
- Federico Orlando (1991–1994), co-director
- Paolo Granzotto (ad interim, 12–19 January 1994)
- Vittorio Feltri (20 January 1994 – 30 November 1997)
- Mario Cervi (1 December 1997 – 19 November 2000)
- Maurizio Belpietro (20 November 2000 – 7 October 2007)
- Mario Giordano (8 October 2007 – 23 August 2009)
- Vittorio Feltri (2nd time), (24 August 2009 – 23 September 2010)
- Alessandro Sallusti (24 September 2010 – 26 September 2012)
- vacant office (27 September – 2 October 2012)
- Alessandro Sallusti (2nd time), (3 October 2012 – 16 May 2021)
- Livio Caputo (interim, 17 May – 14 June 2021)
- Augusto Minzolini (15 June 2021 – 6 September 2023)
- Alessandro Sallusti (3rd time), editor-in-chief, (7 September 2023 – in office)
- Vittorio Feltri (3rd time), editorial director, (7 September 2023 – in office)

== Journalists and collaborators (since 1994) ==
- Geminello Alvi
- Paolo Armaroli
- Gianni Baget Bozzo
- Luciana Baldrighi
- Gabriele Barberis
- Matteo Basile
- Massimo Bertarelli
- Fausto Biloslavo
- Francesco Boezi
- Antonio Borrelli
- Paolo Bracalini
- Valeria Braghieri
- Michele Brambilla
- Claudio Borghi Aquilini
- Pietrangelo Buttafuoco
- Maurizio Cabona
- Matteo Carnieletto
- Mario Cervi
- Gian Marco Chiocci
- Chiara Clausi
- Andrea Cortellari
- Andrea Cuomo
- Tony Damascelli
- Francesco Damato
- Giuseppe De Bellis
- Fabrizio De Feo
- Osvaldo De Paolini
- Paolo Del Debbio
- Francesco Maria Del Vigo
- Luca Doninelli
- Niccolò Ellena
- Filippo Facci
- Adalberto Falletta
- Domenico Ferrara
- Roberto Festorazzi
- Marcello Foa
- Carlo Franza
- Clarissa Gigante
- Mario Giordano
- Alessandro Gnocchi
- Jacopo Granzotto
- Paolo Granzotto
- Giordano Bruno Guerri
- Luciano Gulli
- Paolo Guzzanti
- Marco Iacona
- Andrea Indini
- Massimo Introvigne
- Xavier Jacobelli
- Lucio Lami
- Giancarlo Lehner
- Thomas Leoncini
- Marco Lombardo
- Stefano Lorenzetto
- Carlo Lottieri
- Vittorio Macioce
- Ida Magli
- Maria Giovanna Maglie
- Massimo Malpica Orabona
- Fabio Marchese Ragona
- Giuseppe Marino
- Luigi Mascheroni
- Nicola Matteucci
- Gian Micalessin
- Morgan
- Giorgio Mulé
- Amedeo Nigra
- Fiamma Nirenstein
- Franco Ordine
- Piero Ostellino
- Massimiliano Parente
- Roberta Pasero
- Carlo Pelanda
- Riccardo Pelliccetti
- Giancarlo Perna
- Marco Pizzorno
- Paolo Cirino Pomicino
- Claudio Pompei
- Nicola Porro
- Andrea Pucci
- Gaetano Quagliariello
- Massimo Restelli
- Sandro Rinaldini
- Eugenia Roccella
- Cinzia Romani
- Diego Rubero
- Orlando Sacchelli
- Matteo Sacchi
- Alessandro Sallusti
- Roberto Scafuri
- Salvatore Scarpino
- Adalberto Signore
- Riccardo Signori
- Enrico Silvestri
- Vittorio Sgarbi
- Stenio Solinas
- Luca Telese
- Massimo Teodori
- Giorgio Torelli
- Salvatore Tramontano
- Marcello Veneziani
- Giorgio Vittadini
- Stefano Zecchi
- Stefano Vladovich
- Stefano Zurlo
- Marcello Zacché

== Columns ==
The weekly columns published in il Giornale are as follows:

- Monday: La lente sulla casa (by Corrado Sforza Fogliani), Radiogiornale (by Paolo Giordano), Il Gervaso di Pandora-Aforismi in Libertà (by Roberto Gervaso) and Il Punto Serie A (by Tony Damascelli);
- Tuesday: I lapilli di Pompeo (by Pompeo Locatelli) and Box Office (by Cinzia Romani);
- Wednesday: Teledico (by Laura Rio) and Una macchina chiamata corpo (by Corrado Bait, only in Salute specials);
- Thursday: La mostra della Settimana (by Carlo Franza), Strisce pedonali (by Massimo Ghenzer), FuoriSerie (by Matteo Sacchi) and Malati e Malattie (by Gloria Saccani Jotti);
- Friday: Retrobottega (by Andrea Cuomo), Mercati che fare (by Leopoldo Gasbarro), Teledico;
- Saturday: Zuppa di Porro (by Nicola Porro), Qui e Ora (by Karen Rubin), Rosso Malpelo (by Paolo Guzzanti), Lo Spillo (unsigned), La vite è una cosa meravigliosa (by Andrea Cuomo, in the supplement), #lavitaèsoltantounaquestionedistile (by Marchesa d'Aragona, in the supplement), Un posto a teatro (by Stefania Vitulli);
- Sunday: L'articolo della domenica (by Francesco Alberoni), Il consiglio utile (by Oscar Grazioli), Biblioteca Liberale (by Nicola Porro), Tagli di Piombo (by Massimo Piombo), Il quadro di Sgarbi (by Vittorio Sgarbi), La bacchettata (by Giovanni Gavezzeni), L'arte della Tv (by Luca Beatrice).

== See also ==
- List of newspapers in Italy
