= Mario Giordano =

Italian journalist and writer (born 1966)

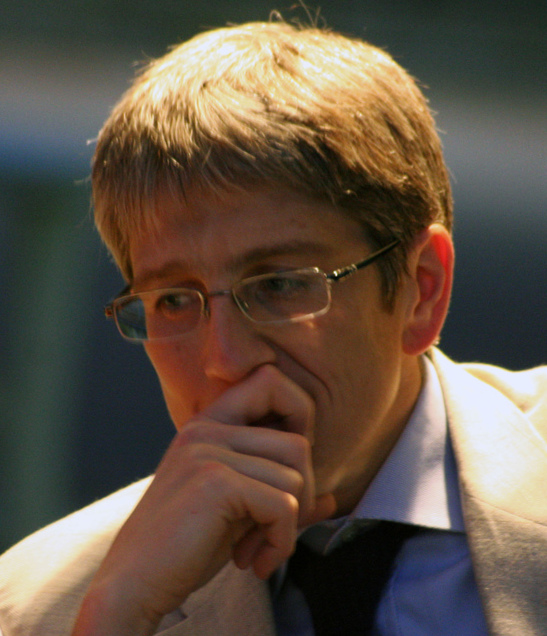
- Giordano in 2007
- Born: Mario Giordano; 19 June 1966 (age 60); Alessandria, Italy
- Occupations: Journalist, television presenter
- Height: 1.78 m (5 ft 10 in)

Mario Giordano (born 19 June 1966) is an Italian journalist, television host and essayist, known for his distinctive style and his investigations into waste, politics, and current affairs. He currently hosts the current affairs program Fuori dal coro on Rete 4, where he addresses social issues and topical matters. He is considered one of the most controversial journalists in the Italian right-wing media sphere and is known for his sensationalist style in his television shows.

== Career ==
Giordano was born in Alessandria, Italy. After graduating in political science at the University of Turin, he started his career as a journalist writing for some local weekly and daily publications, such as the Catholic weekly publication Nostro tempo in 1994, where he met the journalist Marco Travaglio, and L'informazione. In 1996, he became an editorialist at Il Giornale, where he collaborated with Vittorio Feltri. Since 1997, he has appeared in some talk shows and debate programmes on RAI as commentator with the journalist Gad Lerner. Some sources have attributed his voice condition to Klinefelter syndrome, although he has denied this.

From 2000 to 2007, Giordano was editor in chief of Studio Aperto news program on television channel Italia 1. From 2007 to 2009, he was editor-in-chief of Il Giornale, replacing Maurizio Belpietro. He then returned to Mediaset as director of Mediaset News (2009–10). In 2011, he moved to management of Mediaset All-News TGcom24. In 2013, he directed the Videonews section. In 2014, he was appointed as director of TG4, and in 2018 he was appointed head of Strategies and Development of Mediaset information. As a journalist, after writing for Libero, he writes for Belpietro's La Verità. Since 2018, he has led the program Fuori dal coro on Rete 4.

== Sanctions and complaints ==
Giordano was subject to various disciplinary sanctions by the professional order association Ordine dei Giornalisti (Order of Journalists). In December 2008, Giordano, as director of Il Giornale, was found to have "violated the regulation on the obligation of rectification, even without rectifying, even in the absence of a specific request, the information that after their dissemination has proved to be inaccurate or incorrect, especially when the error could damage individual persons, associations or communities." In October 2009, Giordano, as director of Il Giornale, was found to have "omitted the control, and therefore allowed the publication, of the counterfeit photographs appeared on Il Giornale with the obvious addition of elements not originally present in the original work of the photographer." In March 2015, Giordano was sued by the entrepreneur Massimo Ferrero for mentioning the latter in the book titled Pescecani with regard to the bankruptcy fraud of Livingston Energy Flight company.

== Disciplinary proceeding for racism and hate speech ==
The Order of Journalists of Lombardy has recently sanctioned the former editor of Libero, Maurizio Belpietro, and the journalist Mario Giordano over an old article referring to Roma people. The disputed text was published on 8 November 2015 under the title "Let's keep the Roma killers, let's reward the thieves." Reporting on a crime news story, the journalist wrote:

"Let's allow ourselves to be massacred. Let's allow ourselves to be killed. Let's wait until it happens to us. Let's wait for our turn. Let's wait for an evening when horror knocks on the door of our home disguised as a Roma person. Please make sure you say Roma (…) and not gypsies, otherwise Boldrini will be offended. Even when they are beating you to death, while they shatter your teeth and jaws, while they send you to your maker in order to steal the meagre savings you have accumulated in your piggy bank through a lifetime of sacrifice, remember it well: you must say Roma."

The article was punished with a censure, not in the commonly understood sense of censorship, but as a disciplinary sanction imposed "in cases of abuses or serious misconduct, consisting of a formal reprimand for the ascertained violation," as provided for by the regulations governing the journalistic profession. In 2020, Giordano was again censured by the Order of Journalists of Lombardy over an opinion expressed not by him, but by the guest Vittorio Feltri. Following this event, the mayor of Naples, Luigi de Magistris, filed a criminal complaint against Vittorio Feltri and Mario Giordano for defamation in the press, aggravated by racial hatred, and for incitement to racial hatred.

== Personal life ==
Giordano married his wife, Paola, in 1991. They have four children: Alice (born 1993), Lorenzo (born 1995), Camilla (born 2003), and Sara (born 2005).

Media offices
Preceded by Paolo Liguori	Editor in chief of Studio Aperto; 2000–2007	Succeeded by Giorgio Mulé
Preceded by Maurizio Belpietro	Editor in chief of Il Giornale; 2007–2009	Succeeded by Vittorio Feltri
Preceded by Giorgio Mulé	Editor in chief of Studio Aperto; 2009–2010	Succeeded by Giovanni Toti
Preceded by Giovanni Toti	Editor in chief of TG4; 2014–present	Incumbent
