= Nicola Porro =

Italian journalist, television presenter and essayist (born 1969)

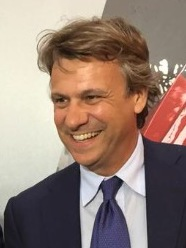
- Nicola Porro in 2015
- Born: Nicola Porro; 27 September 1969 (age 57); Rome, Lazio, Italy
- Education: Sapienza University of Rome
- Occupations: Italian journalist, television presenter and essayist
- Height: 1.82 m (6 ft 0 in)

Nicola Porro (born 27 September 1969) is an Italian journalist, television presenter and essayist. He is the deputy director of Il Giornale and host of in-depth journalism television programs.

== Biography ==
Of Apulian origin, he descends from an ancient aristocratic landowner family, the Porro. His mother was a psychologist and his father a farmer.

From the first grade to the high school diploma he studied at the Massimiliano Massimo Institute. Graduated in economics and commerce with 110 cum laude at the University of Rome "La Sapienza" with a thesis in industrial and commercial techniques, thanks to a scholarship he attended a Business Case Discussion course at Harvard University and a course on the financial specialization of leasing companies at the SDA Bocconi School of Management.

In 1994 he became spokesperson for Antonio Martino, minister of foreign affairs during the first Berlusconi government. He has been a professional journalist since 1997.

Previously, he worked for three years at the daily newspaper Il Foglio, where he edited Il Foglio Finanziario. He collaborated with Corriere Economia, where he managed the column Visi pallidi. At the beginning of his career, he worked in the editorial office for the economic programs Re Mida and Quadrante economico, broadcast on Mediaset, for which he created the programs of the all-financial news channel CFN-CNBC in 2000.

Having become a regular contributor to the Il Giornale in 2003, he holds the position of deputy editor. In the newspaper he writes editorials and the columns Biblioteca liberale and Zuppa di Porro, the latter focusing on economics.

In 2010 he was a member of the Amici della domenica, a jury for the Strega Prize.

From September 2011 to June 2013 he hosted the program In onda on La7 together with Luca Telese. After being fired from La7 in July 2013, Porro moved to Rai 2, becoming the host and author of the new in-depth program Virus - Il contagio delle idee, broadcast in prime time until 2016.

From 2014 to 2016 he taught Theories and techniques of journalistic language at the IULM University of Milan as a contract professor.

In 2015 he founded the opinion site ''nicolaporro.it'' which, in addition to publishing his daily press review (La zuppa di Porro, from the name of his column in Il Giornale), hosts the contributions of various collaborators of the liberal-conservative area, becomes a newspaper from 20 April 2021.

On 21 June 2016, he made his move to Mediaset official from 1 July of the same year, taking charge of hosting Matrix, which airs twice a week in the late evening on Canale 5 from 2016 to 2019. Furthermore, in the 2017-2018 season, he hosted 105 Matrix, a radio program broadcast every day at 7 pm on Radio 105, together with the co-host of the television program Greta Mauro.

Since 17 September 2018, he has hosted a new political analysis program on Rete 4, Quarta Repubblica, broadcast every Monday in prime time. On the occasion of elections, he hosts several specials of the program, such as La notte americana, dedicated to the American elections that saw Donald Trump and Joe Biden as protagonists. On 12 and 13 June 2023, he hosts with Paolo Del Debbio and Cesara Buonamici, simulcast on the three Mediaset networks, two special broadcasts on the death of Silvio Berlusconi. On 25 June, he hosts a special on the attempted coup in Russia.

In 2021, he inaugurates a series of meetings, entitled La Ripartenza, with panels dedicated to the most important companies and managers of the Italian economy, which has reached its seventh edition. The events were held at the teatro Petruzzelli in Bari, at the IBM studios in Milan and at the Istituto Marangoni in Miami.

In April 2023, he acquired the publishing house Liberilibri with the aim of expanding his site and countering the "rampant conformism that has the traits of a good-natured totalitarianism".

In parallel with Quarta Repubblica, from 4 September to 22 December 2023, from Monday to Friday, always on Rete 4, he hosts Stasera Italia.

From 12 November 2024, he also presents the weekly program Red Pill, an evening program of Atlantico Quotidiano (the name refers to a metaphor taken from the 1999 film Matrix by Andy and Larry Wachowski, a metaphor taken from the Internet slang of the incel and MGTOW community for which the "red pill" represents the act of opening one's eyes to the world as opposed to the blue pill that keeps the sleeping individual in line with the "mainstream").

== Personal life ==
He is married to Allegra Galimberti and has two children: Ferdinando and Violetta. He runs a family farm in Andria, together with his brother Gian Michele, where he produces wine and oil.

== Legal proceedings and controversies ==
In 2010 he was the subject of judicial investigations, ordered by the Naples Public Prosecutor's Office against him, for private violence against the president of Confindustria Emma Marcegaglia, due to some wiretaps regarding some of his conversations with Marcegaglia's spokesperson, Rinaldo Arpisella. In 2016 Porro was acquitted of the charge because "the fact does not exist".

In June 2020, during the Quarta Repubblica program hosted by Porro, an audio recording was broadcast of the then deceased judge Amedeo Franco toga a lateral of the Cassation trial of Silvio Berlusconi, who reported to the knight harsh and negative judgments on the sentence of August 2013. After the broadcast of the audio, a series of articles followed in various national newspapers that spoke of "cowardly methods", "fake trial", "rigged sentence", "conspiracy", "the judiciary did a dirty job", "firing squad". After these events, judge Antonio Esposito filed a complaint for aggravated defamation against a dozen people including Anna Maria Bernini, Vittorio Feltri, Piero Sansonetti, Fabrizio Cicchitto, Pietro Senaldi, Alessandro Sallusti and Nicola Porro.

On 22 May 2023, the Order of Journalists opens a disciplinary action against him on charges of having interviewed the Ukrainian deputy foreign minister Emine Dzhaparova in Quarta Repubblica without cross-examination. The disciplinary council of the order, in self-defense on 24 May, decides to cancel the proceedings and cancel the summons of the journalist.

On 28 June 2023, he is sentenced in the first instance by the court of Milan for defamation against Nanni Delbecchi, a journalist for il Fatto Quotidiano, paying compensation of 16 thousand euros.

== Newspapers ==
Year	Title
1989–1994	L'Opinione
1995–2000	Il Foglio
	Corriere Economia
Il Mondo
2003–present	Il Giornale
2015–present	Nicolaporro.it

== Television programs ==
Year	Title	Network	Role
2011–2013	In onda	La7	Conductor
2013–2016	Virus - Il contagio delle idee	Rai 2	Conductor
2016–2019	Matrix	Canale 5	Conductor
2018–present	Quarta Repubblica	Rete 4	Conductor
2020, 2023	Speciale Matrix	Canale 5	Conductor
2023	Stasera Italia	Rete 4	Conductor

== Radio ==
Title	Network	Role
Prima pagina	Rai Radio 3	Conductor
Matrix 105	Radio 105	Conductor

== Works ==
- Mario Cervi and Nicola Porro (2007). Sprecopoli. Tutto quello che non vi hanno mai detto sui nuovi sprechi della politica (Collana Frecce ed.). Milan: Mondadori.
- La disuguaglianza fa bene. Manuale di sopravvivenza per un liberista (Collana Le onde ed.). Milan: La nave di Teseo. 2016. ISBN 978-88-934-4048-6.
- Le tasse invisibili. L'inganno di stato che toglie a tutti per dare a pochi. Milano: La nave di Teseo. 2019. ISBN 978-88-939-5032-9.
- Il padreterno è liberale. Antonio Martino e le idee che non muoiono mai. Segrate: Piemme. 2022. ISBN 978-88-566-8658-6.
- Gli Altarini della Sinistra. 2023.
- La grande bugia verde. 2024.
