= Philippe Barbey =

French historian and sociologist (born 1960)

- Born: 12 December 1960 (age 65)

Academic background
- Education: Ecole Pratique des Hautes Etudes; Paris Descartes University
- Thesis: Max Weber et les charismes spécifiques: la mondialisation d'un christianisme de conversion, un charisme d'évangélisation?: une étude de cas, les Témoins de Jéhovah
- Doctoral advisor: Michel Maffesoli

Academic work
- Discipline: History; Sociology
- Main interests: Academic study of new religious movements
- Website: barbey.jimdofree.com

Philippe Barbey (born 12 December 1960) is a French writer, historian, religion and secularism researcher and sociologist, with an interest in the academic study of new religious movements.

== Biography ==
=== Early life and education ===
Barbey was born on 12 December 1960. He graduated in 2001, and earned a Master 2 in the Ecole Pratique des Hautes Etudes, and from 2008 he holds a PhD in social sciences from Paris Descartes University with the thesis Max Weber et les charismes spécifiques: la mondialisation d'un christianisme de conversion, un charisme d'évangélisation?: une étude de cas, les Témoins de Jéhovah under the tutelage of Michel Maffesoli.

=== Academic work ===
Barbey is member of the Association Française de Sciences sociales des Religions (AFSR) and member of the Groupe d'étude des sociologies compréhensives et phénoménologiques (GESCOP) of the Centre d'Etude sur l'Actuel et le Quotidien (CEAQ).

== Works ==
=== Thesis ===
- Barbey, Philippe (2001). Les Témoins de Jéhovah – La survivance du christianisme antitrinitaire: une résistance spirituelle pour la foi en un Dieu unique (Thesis of Diplome of the École Pratique des Hautes Études (EPHE)). Sorbonne.
- ——————— (2008). Max Weber et les charismes spécifiques: la mondialisation d'un christianisme de conversion, un charisme d'évangélisation?: une étude de cas, les Témoins de Jéhovah (PhD thesis, Paris V). OCLC 690676751.

=== Books ===
- Barbey, Philippe (1998). Les croyances religieuses de l'enfant et l'école, en France, Approches cliniques du développement, mémoire de licence en sciences de l'éducation. Limoges: Faculté de lettres et sciences humaines.
- ——————— (1998). Les Témoins de Jéhovah : à la croisée des chemins ? Une enquête sociologique qualitative, Ethnosociologie, mémoire de licence en sciences de l'éducation. Limoges: Faculté de lettres et sciences humaines.
- ——————— (1999). La laïcité : une ressource pour la médiation sociale ?, mémoire de maîtrise en sciences de l'éducation. Limoges: Faculté de lettres et sciences humaines.
- ——————— (2003). Les témoins de Jéhovah: pour un christianisme original. Collection Religion et sciences humaines. L'Harmattan. ISBN 9782747540643.

=== Book chapters ===
- Barbey, Philippe (2005). "De la mise à l'index aux camps de concentration: le cas des Témoins de Jéhovah". In Chatelain, Serge (ed.). Pour en finir avec les camps. L'Harmattan. ISBN 2-296-00058-4.
- ——————— (2011). Les Témoins de Jéhovah - Une analyse sociologique. Villeneuve d'Ascq: Éditions de l'Atelier National de Reproduction des Thèses-ANRT.
- ——————— (2016). "Jehovah's Witnesses: Between Tradition and Modernity". In Vonck, Chris; Rosenberg, Henri; Dericquebourg, Régis (eds.). The Jehovah's Witnesses in scholarly perspective : what is new in the scientific study of the movement?. Proceedings of the conference at the FVG April 21–22, 2016. Wilrijk-Antwerpen, Belgium: Faculty for Comparative Study of Religions and Humanism. pp. 93–111.
- ——————— (2019). "Les Témoins de Jéhovah". In Anne-Laure Zwilling (ed.). Les minorités religieuses en France. Bayard Editions. pp. 1201–1213.
