= Maurizio Belpietro =

Italian journalist and television presenter (born 1958)

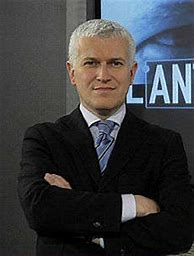
- Born: Maurizio Belpietro; 10 May 1958 (age 68); Castenedolo, Italy
- Occupations: Journalist, television presenter
- Height: 1.70 m (5 ft 7 in)

Maurizio Belpietro (born 10 May 1958) is an Italian journalist and television presenter.

== Career ==
Belpietro was born in Castenedolo, near Brescia, but he grew up in the town of Palazzolo sull'Oglio. He started his career as a journalist writing for the local newspaper Bresciaoggi in 1975. In 1994, he moved on to il Giornale with the journalist Vittorio Feltri, and returned few years later after a period as editor of the newspaper Il Tempo in 1996. From 2001 to 2007, he worked as editor of il Giornale. He was succeeded by the journalist Mario Giordano when he became editor-in-chief of Italian newsmagazine Panorama.

In 2004, he became presenter of the television newsmagazine L'Antipatico, broadcast on Canale 5 and later on Rete 4. Since October 2007, he has also appeared on the morning news program Mattino Cinque. In 2009, he became editor-in-chief of the right-wing newspaper Libero, replacing Feltri. He also hosts a short radio news program every morning on the radio station R101. In 2016, he founded a new independent daily newspaper La Verità, of which he is the editor-in-chief. In 2018, he became for the second time editor-in-chief for Panorama.

== Supreme Court of Cassation sentence ==
In April 2010, Belpietro was sentenced by the Italian Supreme Court of Cassation with sentence No. 13198 for contempt with the following motivation:

- Italian: "La pubblicazione di articoli fortemente polemici contro la magistratura può portare il direttore del quotidiano responsabile della pubblicazione alla condanna per vilipendio e diffamazione."
- English: "Publishing harshly news articles with a contentious content against Magistrates can lead to the editor in chief responsible of the publication to be sentenced for contempt and defamation."

The European Court of Human Rights did not uphold the verdict on the grounds that he was sentenced to 4 years in prison, which was suspended, holding this to be too harsh and enough to have violated his freedom of speech.

Media offices
Preceded by ?	Managing editor of L'Europeo; 1989–1992	Succeeded by ?
Preceded by ?	Deputy editor-in-chief of L'Indipendente; 1992–1994	Succeeded by ?
Preceded by Federico Orlando	Deputy editor-in-chief of il Giornale; 1994–1996	Succeeded by Stefano Lorenzetto
Preceded by Gianni Mottola	Editor-in-chief of Il Tempo; 1996–1997	Succeeded by Giampaolo Cresci
Preceded by ?	Deputy editor-in-chief of Quotidiano Nazionale; 1997	Succeeded by ?
Preceded by ?	Deputy editor-in-chief of il Giornale; 1997–2001	Succeeded by ?
Preceded by Mario Cervi	Editor-in-chief of il Giornale; 2001–2007	Succeeded by Mario Giordano
Preceded by Pietro Calabrese	Editor-in-chief of Panorama; 2007–2009	Succeeded by Giorgio Mulé
Preceded by Vittorio Feltri	Editor-in-chief of Libero; 2009-2016	Succeeded by Vittorio Feltri
