= Pietro Calabrese =

Italian journalist

Pietro Calabrese (8 May 1944, Rome – 12 September 2010, Rome) was an Italian journalist who worked for l'ANSA, the Gazzetta dello Sport, Panorama and Il Messaggero.

== Biography ==
Calabrese was born to Palermitano parents, Giovanna Voltaggio and Salvatore Calabrese. He spent his infancy and adolescence between Palermo and Rome, where he studied at the Collegio San Giuseppe - Istituto De Merode near the Piazza di Spagna. After achieving a degree in law, he entered the Chamber of Deputies as a fellow, to become a parliamentary official. Afterwards, he left the administration of the Palazzo Montecitorio to dedicate himself to journalist. Recognized as a Giornalista professionista by 1974, he won three assignments from the Agenzia Nazionale Stampa Associata, where he began to work.

For 8 years, he was a correspondent for ANSA and then Il Messaggero, for two years in Madrid, four in Paris, and two in Brussels.

He died in Rome on 12 September 2010 at the Clinica Paideia, due to illness.

== Honors ==
- The outer main-belt asteroid 10699 Calabrese, discovered by American astronomer Schelte Bus at the Australian Siding Spring Observatory in 1981, was named in his memory on 13 April 2017 (M.P.C. 103977).
