= Nathalie Guetta =

French actress

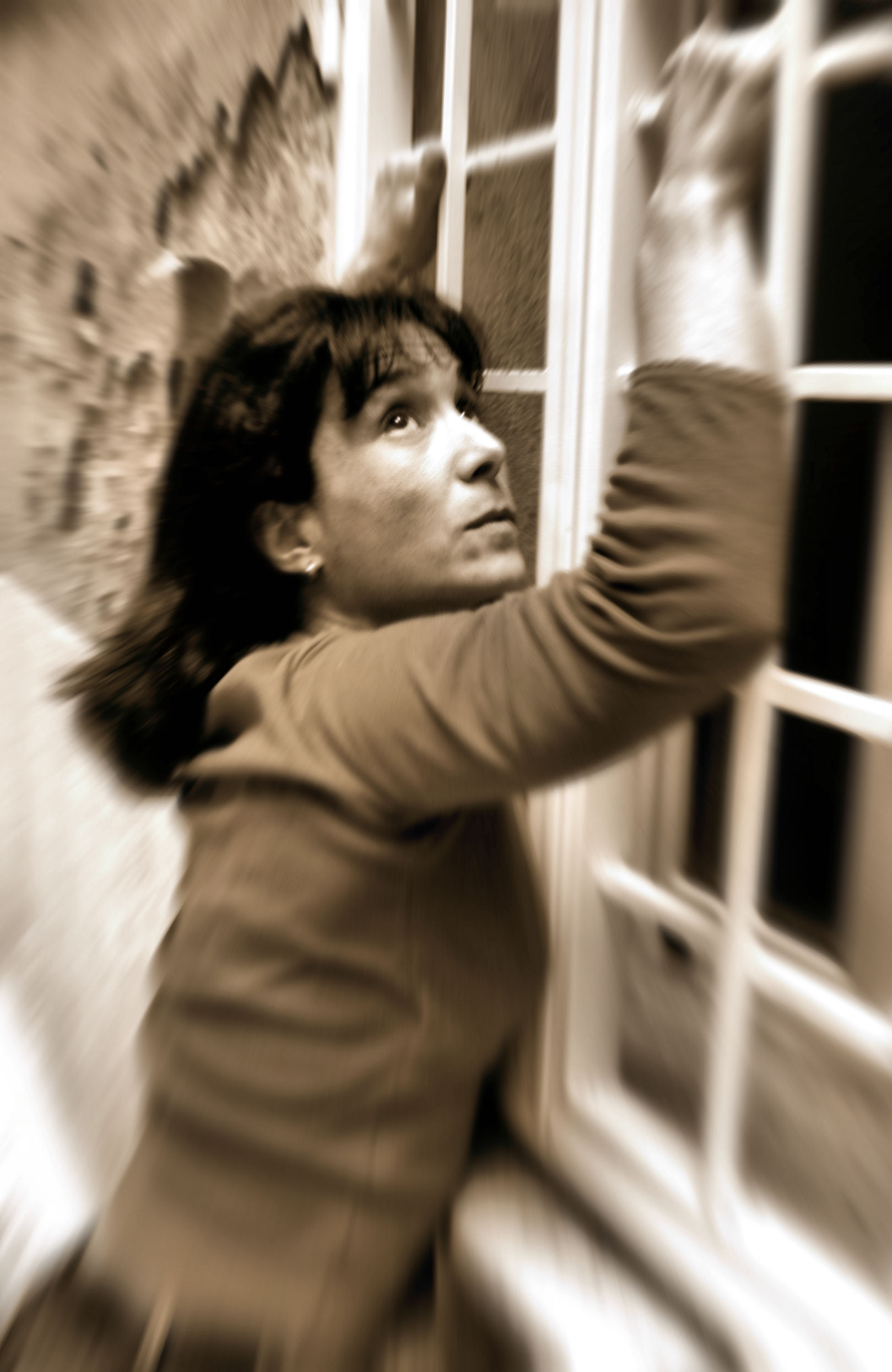
- Born: Nathalie Evalyne Guetta; 9 September 1958 (age 67); Paris, France
- Citizenship: France; Italy
- Occupation: Actress
- Years active: 1989–present
- Notable work: Don Matteo
- Relatives: Bernard Guetta (brother); David Guetta (half-brother)

Nathalie Evalyne Guetta (French pronunciation: [natali ɡeta]; born 9 September 1958) is a French–Italian actress and circus performer. Born in Paris and later naturalised Italian, she is best known to Italian television audiences for her role as the housekeeper Natalina in the TV series Don Matteo.

== Biography ==
Born to Pierre Guetta, a sociologist of Moroccan Jewish origin, and Francine Bourla, a gallery owner of tribal art. She has a twin sister, is the sister of journalist and politician Bernard Guetta; disc jockey and producer David Guetta is a half-brother born from her father's second marriage.

At the age of 16 she left her native, Paris, to attend circus courses and shows in France and the Benelux. After six years she arrived in Naples, and also began her activity teaching clowning and creating shows with puppets.

In 1989 she gained notoriety with a wider audience, thanks to her appearances on the Maurizio Costanzo Show in various acrobatic numbers. She debuted in cinema in 1987 with a very small role in Intervista by Federico Fellini, then noticed by Cristina Comencini, who cast her in her film The Amusements of Private Life, thus beginning her career as an actress, appearing mostly in television productions. In her career she also received a nomination for the Nastro d'Argento.

Since 2000 she has been in the cast of the fiction series Don Matteo on Rai 1.

In 2018 she took part as a contestant in the thirteenth edition of the talent show Ballando con le stelle, hosted by Milly Carlucci on Rai 1, and from the same year she appeared in some episodes of Stasera tutto è possibile, a variety show on Rai 2 hosted by Amadeus and later by Stefano De Martino.

In 2023 she competed in The Masked Singer as the Hamster, finishing third.

In 2025 she competed in Pechino Express paired with Vito Bucci.

== Private life ==
Until 2020 she was married to Yudiel Sánchez, whom she met in Cuba in 2007.

== Filmography ==
=== Cinema ===
- Intervista, directed by Federico Fellini (1987)
- Roma-Paris-Barcelona, directed by Paolo Grassini and Italo Spinelli (1989)
- The Amusements of Private Life, directed by Cristina Comencini (1990)
- Ricky & Barabba, directed by Christian De Sica (1992)
- Return to Home Gori, directed by Alessandro Benvenuti (1996)
- A Liar in Paradise, directed by Enrico Oldoini (1998)
- The Last Gift, directed by Marcello Daciano – short film (2004)
- Two to Tango, directed by Andrea Barzini (2005)
- No Messages in the Answering Machine, directed by Paolo Genovese and Luca Miniero (2005)
- The Dinner to Make Them Meet, directed by Pupi Avati (2007)

=== Television ===
- God Sees and Provides – TV series, 2 episodes (1996–1997)
- Nuda proprietà vendesi, directed by Paolo Costella and Enrico Oldoini – TV film (1997)
- Don Matteo – TV series, 275 episodes (2000–present)
- Ho sposato uno sbirro – TV series, episode 2x10 (2010)

== Television programs ==
- Cielito Lindo (Rai 3, 1993)
- Dopo fiction (Rai 1, 2017)
- Ballando con le stelle (Rai 1, 2018) contestant
- Stasera tutto è possibile (Rai 2, since 2018)
- Prodigi – La musica è vita (Rai 1, 2018)
- Una voce per Padre Pio (Rai 1, 2020)
- Bar Stella (Rai 2, 2022–2023)
- The Masked Singer (Rai 1, 2023) contestant
- Pechino Express (Sky Uno, 2025) contestant

== Awards ==
- Nastro d'argento
  - 1991 – Nomination for Best Supporting Actress for The Amusements of Private Life
- Taormina Film Fest
  - 2018 – Nomination for the Golden Orange Television Award for Don Matteo
