= Fausto Biloslavo =

Italian journalist

Fausto Biloslavo (born in Trieste, 13 November 1961) is an Italian journalist. As a correspondent and freelance journalist, he witnessed conflicts from the Soviet invasion of Afghanistan to the Balkans and Africa. Most recently he reported from Iraq and the Middle East.

== Biography ==
Fausto Biloslavo was born and raised in Trieste, where he also attended school. He graduated from Trieste University in Political Sciences / International branch.

In 1982 at the age of 21, Biloslavo was in Lebanon during the civil war, as a freelance writer and photographer, during the Siege of Beirut in the summer of 1982. During the Israeli drive he was the only one to witness the then PLO leader Yasser Arafat, fleeing Beirut.

In 1983 with two right-wing friends, Almerigo Grilz and Gian Micalessin, Biloslavo founded the Albatross Press Agency, a freelance agency. The agency produced TV reports, and first hand war correspondence from the world's hot spots, selling its works to the main international networks, mainly to CBS and NB in the English-speaking countries, but even to the German NDR, and the TSI (Italian Swiss Television channel).

In Italy, beside the highly negative prejudice that surrounded the agency for being founded by former members of the right-wing party MSI-DN, Albatross gained notoriety for selling his stories to Panorama and to the state-owned RAI TV news TG1. During these years Albatross covered news from Iran, Cyprus, Libya, Sudan, Uganda, the Philippines and Afghanistan.

In 1987 Biloslavo crossed into Afghanistan from Pakistan, and spent four months living with Mujaheddin. On his way back to Pakistan he was stopped by the Afghan Police. He was detained for seven months and sentenced to a seven-year-sentence to be spent in the Pul I Charki prison in Kabul. He was released after 202 days of detention, thanks to the personal intervention of former Italian president Francesco Cossiga.

In March 1997 he negotiated the release of Mauro Galliani, an Italian reporter kidnapped in Chechnya.

Biloslavo is married to Cinzia and lives in Trieste with his wife and daughter. He is a member of the Paratrooper Association or ANPd'I of Trieste. On April 19, 2012, Fausto Biloslavo was awarded the Giorgio Lago prize.

Biloslavo writes articles for newspapers in Italy, including Il Foglio, Il Giornale, and magazines including Panorama and The Europeo.
