= Libero (newspaper) =

Italian daily newspaper (founded 2000)

- Front page, 22 June 2009
- Format: Berliner
- Owner: Editoriale Libero S.r.l.
- Founder: Vittorio Feltri
- Editor: Daniele Capezzone; Mario Sechi
- Associate editor: Pietro Senaldi
- Founded: 18 July 2000; 25 years ago
- Political alignment: Right-wing populism Pro-Centre-right coalition
- Language: Italian
- Headquarters: Via L. Majno 42, Milan, Italy
- Circulation: 82,680 (as of June 2018)
- ISSN: 1973-5928
- Website: www.liberoquotidiano.it

Libero (English: "Free"), also known as Libero Quotidiano (English: "Daily Free"), is an Italian daily newspaper published in Milan with an average circulation of 22,709 copies in May 2023. In 2004, Angelo Agostini categorized Libero, alongside Il Foglio and l'Unità, as an activist daily (quotidiano-attivista), in contrast to the institution daily (quotidiano-istituzione) like Corriere della Sera and La Stampa, and the agenda daily (quotidiano-agenda) like la Repubblica.

== History and profile ==
Libero was first published in July 2000. The paper's first issue went out on newsstands on 18 July 2000, and the masthead was designed by the graphic designer Franco Bevilacqua; the paper placed itself in the centre-right area. The founder is the journalist Vittorio Feltri, while the owner and publisher of the paper is Editoriale Libero S.r.l.

In February 2007, some members of the New Red Brigades were arrested on a charge of wanting to fire-bomb the Libero editorial offices in Milan. The paper has been edited by Maurizio Belpietro since August 2009. In 2014, the paper aired in Italy the video, originally published by the Middle East Media Research Institute, of an imam during a Friday sermon in a mosque near Venice, in the Italian region of Veneto, calling for Jews to be killed, which prompted the government to expel him; the decision drew widespread support across the political spectrum and from the local Muslim community.

About the paper in 2007, Oscar Giannino said: "Many of our readers buy Libero and Libero mercato because they find there a voice outside the choir and from the parties, but in favour of a clearly liberal and liberist vision, anti-tax and anti-public waste, wary of any party excess ... as well as wary of the excesses of the judiciary, when then justice and security for ordinary citizens are not guaranteed." Observers describe Libero as an activist daily holding anti-immigration, centre-right, right-wing populist, and neoliberal stances, and as a right-wing newspaper, with a tabloid journalism format. Additionally, Feltri was one of the first signatories of the 2006 manifesto of the Liberal Reformers, which asked the country's centre-right coalition for a more liberal stance on socio-cultural issues.

The newspaper has been at the center of numerous controversies regarding its headlines. In 2015, following the terrorist attacks in Paris, Libero titled Islamic Bastard on its front page, causing several Italian muslim groups to file lawsuits against the newspaper. Maurizio Belpietro, director at the time, resigned the following day. In 2019, another front page headline that read GDP down, but gays on the rise was again followed by protests and outrage. The newspaper has actively supported climate change denial and on multiple occasions has mocked and attacked climate activists like Greta Thunberg.

== Circulation ==
The 2008 circulation of the paper was 125,215 copies. The paper had a circulation of 113,628 copies in 2009 and 105,123 copies in 2010. By 2015, its circulation was about 52,000 copies.

== See also ==
- List of newspapers in Italy
