= Vittorio Feltri =

Italian former journalist (born 1943)

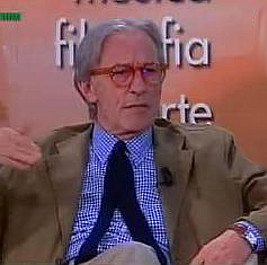
- Feltri in Cortina d'Ampezzo in 2008

Member of the Regional Council of Lombardy
- Incumbent
- Assumed office 14 February 2023

Member of the City Council of Milan
- In office 5 October 2021 – 22 June 2022

Personal details
- Born: 25 June 1943 (age 83) Bergamo, Kingdom of Italy
- Party: PSI (until 1994); None (1994–2005; 2009–2021); RL (2005–2009); FdI (since 2021)
- Height: 1.80 m (5 ft 11 in)
- Spouses: Maria Luisa (died 1968); Enoe Bonfanti (m. 1969)
- Children: 4, including Mattia Feltri
- Education: University of Bergamo

Vittorio Feltri (born 25 June 1943) is an Italian journalist and politician. Among the many Italian newspapers he directed, until 2020 he was the editor-in-chief of daily Libero. From 2023, he has been editorial director of Il Giornale. As a member of the Brothers of Italy party, he was a member of the City Council of Milan from 2021 to 2022, and is a member of the Regional Council of Lombardy. He is the author of several books.

== Early life and education ==
Feltri was born in Bergamo, Italy, one of three children of Adele and Angelo Feltri (1906–1949). His father died at the age of 43 of Addison's disease. At 14 and a half, he began working as a bellboy in a crystal shop, then in a packaging shop, then took a window dressing course. He subsequently entered higher education and gained a political science degree at the University of Bergamo.

== Career ==
Feltri began his career as journalist in 1962, writing film reviews for the local newspaper L'Eco di Bergamo. In 1977, he moved to the Corriere della Sera. In the 1980s and 1990s, he was also director of Bergamo oggi, L'Europeo, and L'Indipendente.

In 1993, Feltri refused the offer of Silvio Berlusconi to get involved in Fininvest. The next year, he agreed to become editor of il Giornale, which was owned by Berlusconi, after its founder Indro Montanelli left. He was its editor until 1997. In the same period, he contributed to other newspapers and magazines, including Panorama, Il Foglio, and Il Messaggero. In 2000, he founded the right-wing newspaper Libero, which he ran until 2009. In August 2009, he once again became the editor of Berlusconi's il Giornale. In 2016, he returned to Libero, which he directed until 2020.

In June 2020, Feltri resigned from the Italian Order of Journalists, of which he had been a member since 22 September 1969. The choice came after a number of controversial statements related to the COVID-19 pandemic, Southern Italy, and disciplinary proceedings. The announcement was made by Il Giornale.

== Politics ==
Politically, Feltri declares himself an antifascist, anti-communist, Eurosceptic, and liberal conservative, with conservative and market liberal views of the economy, and liberal views on issues such as euthanasia, prison reform, prostitution, and recreational drug use. He also shares Oriana Fallaci's criticism of Islam; his newspaper's chosen headline, Bastardi islamici (English: Islamic Bastards), after the November 2015 Paris attacks caused controversy.

An advocate of a constitutional monarchy under the House of Savoy, having taken part at the presentation of the 2001 manifesto of the Italian Monarchist Movement, he favours a presidential system over the status quo of a parliamentary republic. He is a supporter of Silvio Berlusconi and Italy's centre-right coalition, which he saw as the lesser of two evils, preferring the more right-wing Lega Nord and Brothers of Italy (FdI), who nominated him for President of Italy in 2015. In the 2015 Italian presidential election held on 29–31 January, Feltri received 49, 51, and 56 votes in the first three rounds, behind only Ferdinando Imposimato. In the fourth and final round, Feltri finished third with 49 votes.

In 2019, Feltri said that he would be happy if Giorgia Meloni of FdI became Prime Minister of Italy, and said he had voted for Matteo Salvini's Lega in the 2018 Italian general election and the 2019 European Parliament election; for the latter, he was pleased with Lega and the underwhelming results of the Five Star Movement in the province of Bergamo. He was later critical of Salvini. In 2021, he joined the FdI. He became the top candidate of the party for the City Council of Milan elections; elected with 2,268 preferences, he left the office seven months later due to health issues. He was critical of anti-vaxxers. For the 2021 Milan municipal election, he said: "I didn't vote myself, they gave me two sheets and I don't understand a damn thing about what was written. I think I voted Sala. I didn't write the name Feltri." In the 2023 Lombard regional election, as the head of the FdI's party list in support of the incumbent president Attilio Fontana, he was elected with 6,076 preferences. As the most senior member of the Regional Council of Lombardy, he is to chair the first session, which he described as a boredom.

== Personal life ==
Feltri married Maria Luisa at a young age, with whom he had twin daughters Saba Laura and Laura Adele. Widowed in 1967 at the age of 24, with his wife dead due to complications of childbirth, he was remarried in 1968 to Enoe Bonfanti, with whom he had two children: Mattia, who is also a journalist, and Fiorenza. Feltri is an atheist. He is a supporter of Atalanta football club. Feltri owns a bust of Benito Mussolini. About this, he clarified: "For me, born in 1943, anti-fascism has never been in question. The bust was sent by an innkeeper, nice but very fascist. I put it there so as not to see it."

On 13 May 2010, Feltri spoke on Animal Awareness Day, expressing support for animal rights positions, in particular against sport fishing and in favour of vegetarianism. A cat lover, he said he was not completely vegetarian. Despite the conviction for a homophobic insult in 2011, he joined Arcigay in 2014, stating from the pages of Il Giornale: "We are for freedom, without discrimination, convinced that it is necessary to overcome the prejudices that generate misunderstandings, banalities, [and] boring and stupid insults".

== Controversy and legal issues ==
In March 2010, Feltri was suspended six months from the professional register for the Boffo case, dating back to August 2009, and for the articles signed by Renato Farina, one of the Italian journalists who wrote for the newspaper directed by Feltri, published after his disbarment from the register. Feltri reacted to the news by stating: "I am sorry that I am not a pedophile priest or at least a homosexual semi-priest or a left-wing conductor, but that I am simply a journalist who cannot therefore enjoy the protection of the bishops, nor become a martyr of information". In Italian political journalistic language, the Boffo method means the activity of denigration in the press based on specially constructed false documents. Feltri later reiterated that the news he published about Dino Boffo, referring to Boffo's conviction of harassment and alleged homosexuality, was true, that he intended to provide information on the hypocrisy of a part of the Catholic world, and that he still felt sorrowful for having caused his resignation.

In December 2011, the Court of Milan sentenced Feltri to compensate Gianpaolo Silvestri, the former Federation of the Greens senator, among the founders of Arcigay, with €50,000 for a homophobic insult. He had used ad hominem, a strategy of rhetoric also used by the Sophists of ancient Greece, aimed exclusively at damaging the adversary, as opposed to philosopher Socrates, who had the goal of reaching truth. In 2017, Farina said that, according to him, Asia Argento simply chose to prostitute herself in order to be able to make a career. According to Alessandro Sallusti, another Italian journalist, there was nothing wrong with this; according to him, it was unfair to sue after twenty years, and having gained fame.

In 2019, Feltri expressed antisemitic views towards journalist David Parenzo and declared that Jews have bored him with the Holocaust. During a television interview in February 2021, he was asked by the journalist Barbara Palombelli: "Which relevant people would you like in the new government?". He replied to her "Hitler", provoking controversy both on social media and in the press. During a television show in April 2020, Feltri considered Southern Italians as "inferior people". His words caused controversy around Italy. In response, he said that he meant to say they were inferior only and exclusively from an economic point of view, in the sense that the production of material (not spiritual) wealth, according to him, was superior in Lombardy rather than in Campania. He said that he was deeply in love with the city of Naples, its dialect, songs, and culture.

In December 2024, he declared in an interview to Belve that he met Pope Francis and that they discussed common ideas, such as that there is too much homosexuality (using the pejorative word frociaggine) in the Catholic Church.

== Works ==
Feltri is the author of several books, including Buoni e cattivi. Le pagelle con il voto ai personaggi conosciuti in 50 anni di giornalismo (with Stefano Lorenzetto, 2015), Il Quarto Reich. Come la Germania ha sottomesso l'Europa (with Gennaro Sangiuliano, 2014), Non abbiamo abbastanza paura. Noi e l'islam (2015); Il vero cafone (with Massimiliano Parente, 2016), Chiamiamoli ladri. L'esercito dei corrotti (2017), Il borghese. La mia vita e i miei incontri da cronista spettinato (2018), L'irriverente (2019), Ritratti di campioni. Cronache di un giornalista tifoso (2020), and Come era bello l'inizio della fine. I grandi incontri della mia vita (2022).

Media offices
Preceded by Bruno Pievani	Editor-in-chief of BergamoOggi; 1983–1984	Succeeded by Office abolished
Preceded by Lanfranco Vaccari	Editor-in-chief of L'Europeo; 1989–1992	Succeeded by Myriam De Cesco
Preceded by Ricardo Franco Levi	Editor-in-chief of L'Indipendente; 1992–1994	Succeeded by Pia Luisa Bianco
Preceded by Indro Montanelli	Editor-in-chief of Il Giornale; 1994–1997	Succeeded by Mario Cervi
Preceded by Daniele Vimercati	Editor-in-chief of Il Borghese; 1998–1999	Succeeded by Claudio Tedeschi
Preceded by Mauro Tedeschini	Lead editor of Quotidiano Nazionale; 1999–2000	Succeeded by Italo Cucci
Preceded by Andrea Biavardi	Editor-in-chief of Il Giorno; 1999–2000	Succeeded by Umberto Marchesini
Preceded by Office established	Editor-in-chief of Libero; 2000–2007	Succeeded by Alessandro Sallusti
Preceded by Alessandro Sallusti	Editor-in-chief of Libero; 2007–2009	Succeeded by Gianluigi Paragone (ad interim)
Preceded by Mario Giordano	Editor-in-chief of Il Giornale; 2009–2010	Succeeded by Alessandro Sallusti
Preceded by Office established	Lead editor of Libero; 2016–2020	Succeeded by Vacant
