= Agenzia Nazionale Stampa Associata =

Italian news agency

- Type: Not-for-profit cooperative
- Industry: News media
- Founded: 15 January 1945; 81 years ago
- Founders: Edgardo Longoni
- Headquarters: Rome, Italy
- Number of locations: 22 locations in Italy
- Area served: Worldwide
- Key people: Giulio Anselmi, President; Stefano De Alessandri, CEO and director general; Luigi Contu, Editor-in-Chief
- Products: Wire service, news websites
- Website: ansa.it

The Agenzia Nazionale Stampa Associata (ANSA; English: "National Associated Press Agency") is the leading news agency in Italy. ANSA is a not-for-profit cooperative, whose members and owners are 36 leading news organizations in Italy.

== History ==
In January 1945, three representatives of the major political forces of the Italian Resistance, Giuseppe Liverani, managing director of Il Popolo ("The People"), Primo Parrini, managing director of Avanti!, and Amerigo Terenzi, CEO of l'Unità, advanced the possibility to organize a news agency as a cooperative of newspapers, not controlled by the government nor private groups, replacing the work of the Agenzia Stefani, moved to Milan to meet the information needs of the Italian Social Republic. Their proposal had the approval from the Allied military authorities who, a few months later, favored the success of the new agency by closing the Italian Notizie Nazioni Unite (NNU; "United Nations News"), an agency created by Psychological Warfare Division.

Some antifascist newspapers immediately adhered, and a makeshift headquarters was set up in Rome, at 15 Moretto Street, unofficially entrusting the direction of former NNU director Renato Mieli. ANSA's first publication came on 15 January 1945, in the form of a news release and distributed in Rome. After a few weeks ANSA moved to the place formerly occupied by Agenzia Stefani, on Via di Propaganda.

== Profile ==
The ANSA is a cooperative of 36 members of the main Italian newspapers publishers and is designed to collect and transmit information on the main events Italian and world. To this end, the ANSA has 22 offices in Italy and 81 offices in 78 other countries. It headquartered in Rome, in Via della Dataria, 94. The agencies ANSA transmit more than 3,500 news items and more than 1,500 photos a day that are transmitted to the Italian media, national institutions, local and international trade associations, political parties, and trade unions. The ANSA news broadcasts national, local, and sector-specific news. In addition to the news in Italian ANSA transmits its news in English, Spanish, German, Portuguese, and Arabic. Since 1996, the ANSA was the first agency in Italy to spread news via SMS.

From 1985 to 1994, as President of ANSA, he was covered by journalist Giovanni Giovannini. From 1997 to 2009, Boris Biancheri, a diplomat, was president of ANSA. Since 2003, the Ansa, through AnsaMed provides a news service covering the countries of the Mediterranean basin. Since 2009, the new president is Giulio Anselmi, former director of the ANSA from 1997 to 1999. On 10 June, Luigi Contu has been appointed managing director of the agency. On 26 August 2014 a five-year partnership agreement (2015–2020) was signed between AP and ANSA for photos, text and video.

== Directors ==
ANSA was founded on 15 January 1945, and it is based in Rome. The following is a list of the editor-in-chiefs ANSA has had in its history:

- Edgardo Longoni (1945–1947)
- Leonardo Azzarita (1947–1952)
- Angelo Magliano (1952–1958)
- Vittorino Arcangeli (1958–1961)
- Sergio Lepri (1961–1990)
- Bruno Caselli (1990–1997)
- Giulio Anselmi (1997–1999)
- Pierluigi Magnaschi (1999–2006)
- Giampiero Gramaglia (2006–2009)
- Luigi Contu (2009–present)

== Organization ==
ANSA covers national and international events through its 22 offices in Italy and its presence in more than 80 cities in 74 countries around the world. More than 2,000 news items are distributed every day by ANSA, together with more than 700 photos and several videos. ANSA multimedia production is distributed on all the digital platforms (web, TV, satellite, cellphones). Among the more than 1,400 customers of ANSA productions, there are media companies, corporate firms, and the government.

In addition to its primary news website at ANSA.it, ANSA has a news website at ANSAmed.info (where 'med' is short for Mediterranean) which covers the current affairs of all the countries of the Mediterranean basin. "The ANSAmed package consists of a news stream of about 200 stories and reports per day, in English, Italian and Arabic languages. The news covers Euro-Mediterranean and Middle Eastern political news, and economic and business reports from the area."

== Partners ==
List of newspapers whose editors are members of ANSA:

- l'Adige
- Alto Adige
- L'Arena
- Avvenire
- Bresciaoggi
- Il Centro
- Corriere della Sera
- Corriere dello Sport
- Il Corriere Mercantile
- L'Eco di Bergamo
- La Gazzetta del Mezzogiorno
- Gazzetta del Sud
- La Gazzetta dello Sport
- Gazzetta di Mantova
- Nuova Gazzetta di Modena
- La Nuova Ferrara
- Gazzetta di Parma
- Gazzetta di Reggio
- Il Gazzettino
- Il Giornale
- Giornale di Brescia
- Giornale di Sicilia
- Il Giornale di Vicenza
- Il Giorno
- Libertà
- Il Mattino
- Il Mattino di Padova
- Il Messaggero
- Messaggero Veneto
- La Nazione
- Il Piccolo
- La Prealpina
- La Provincia
- La Provincia di Cremona
- La Provincia Pavese
- Il Resto del Carlino
- La Sicilia
- Il Secolo XIX
- Il Sole 24 Ore
- La Stampa
- Il Tempo
- Il Tirreno
- Trentino
- La Tribuna di Treviso
- la Repubblica
- La Nuova Sardegna
- L'Unione Sarda
- l'Unità
- La Nuova Venezia

== See also ==
- List of newspapers in Italy
- List of news agencies
- Ansa Mediterranean
- Agenzia Stefani, ANSA's precursor
- InfoMigrants
