= List of newspapers in Italy =

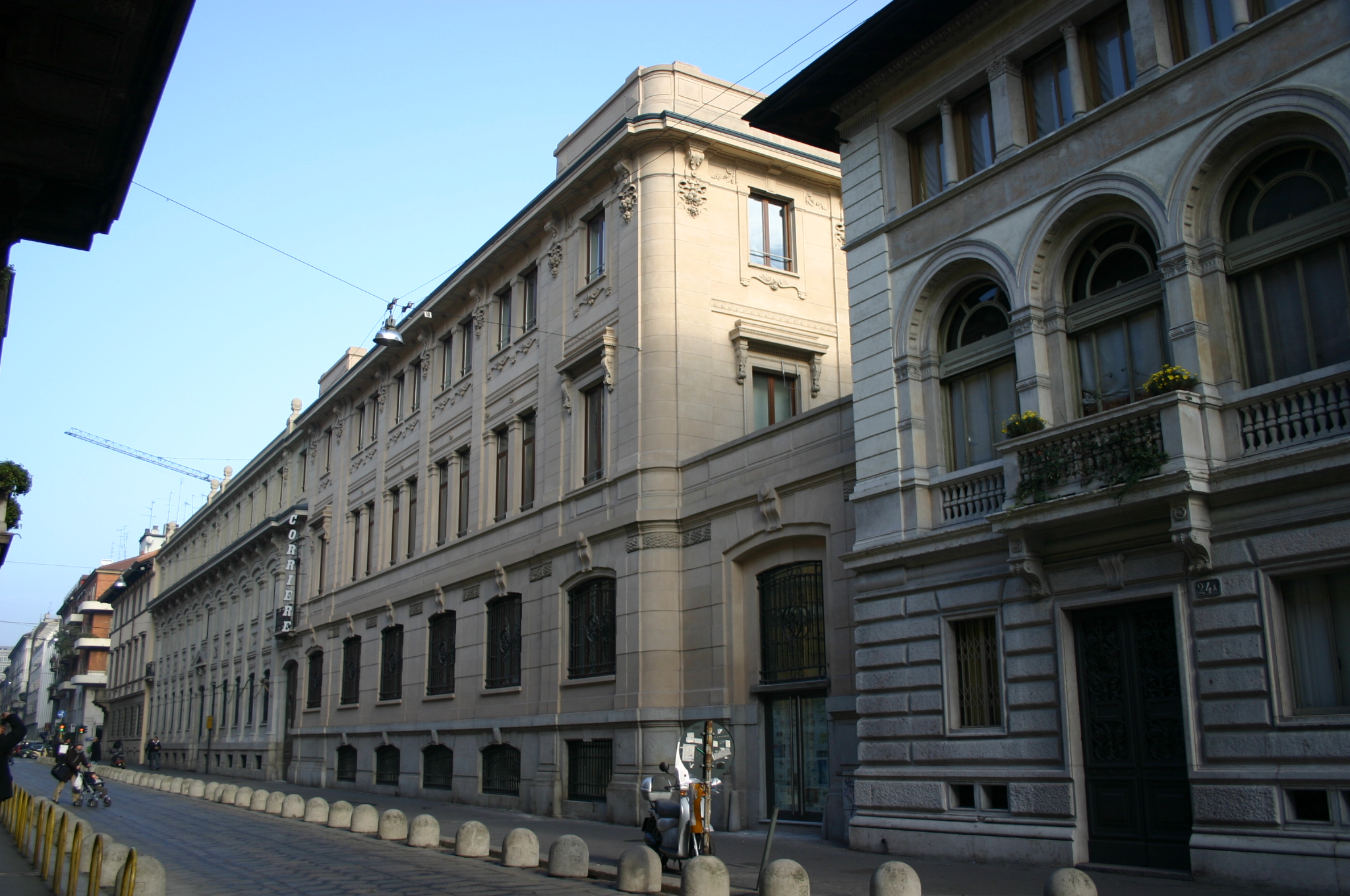
The historic seat of the Corriere della Sera in via Solferino in Milan

This is a list of newspapers in Italy, organised according to scope and ordered according to circulation.

The daily print newspapers in Italy were 107 in 1950, whereas there were 78 in 1965. It has further declined since and 76 are listed in this article: 22 countrywide newspapers (including some "opinion" or "political" newspapers with very limited circulation, that are available only in Rome and few other places), 51 regional or local newspapers (some of which have a larger circulation than most countrywide ones) and 3 sports newspapers (all three having a much larger circulation on Mondays). The total circulation (both in print and digital) of the 56 newspapers tracked by Accertamenti Diffusione Stampa (ADS) was 1,661,682 in January 2025, down from 2,292,549 for 57 newspapers in January 2020.

Corriere della Sera, established in 1876 and based in Milan, has the largest circulation (200,000+ and 500,000+ digital subscribers), distantly followed by La Repubblica, Il Sole 24 Ore and Avvenire (100,000+ each), and more distantly La Stampa and Il Fatto Quotidiano (60,000+ each). The circulation of some leading "opinion" newspapers, including Il Foglio, Il Riformista and Domani, is not tracked by ADS. Among regional newspapers, those with the largest circulation are Il Messaggero (based in Rome, print circulation in central Italy, 50,000+), Il Resto del Carlino (Emilia-Romagna), Il Gazzettino (Veneto and Friuli-Venezia Giulia), La Nazione (Tuscany) and Dolomiten (South Tyrol). The oldest newspaper is Gazzetta di Parma, established in 1735, with a print circulation limited to the sole province of Parma, Emilia-Romagna.

Political parties used to have their own newspapers, most of which have been either disbanded or transformed into online publications. They have included Avanti! (est. 1896, Italian Socialist Party), Il Popolo d'Italia (est. 1914, Italian Socialist Party / National Fascist Party), La Voce Repubblicana (est. 1921, Italian Republican Party), Il Popolo (est. 1923, Italian People's Party / Christian Democracy / Italian People's Party), L'Unità (est. 1924, Italian Communist Party / Democratic Party of the Left / Democrats of the Left / Democratic Party), L'Umanità (est. 1947, Italian Democratic Socialist Party), La Discussione (est. 1952, Christian Democracy), Secolo d'Italia (est. 1952, Italian Social Movement), Liberazione (est. 1991, Communist Refoundation Party), La Padania (est. 1997, Lega Nord) and Europa (est. 2003, Democracy is Freedom – The Daisy / Democratic Party).

== Countrywide ==
Listed according to circulation, updated to August 2026.

Newspaper	Circulation	Headquarters	Est.	Orientation
Corriere della Sera	194,639	Milan	1876	Liberalism
La Repubblica	123,028	Rome	1976	Progressivism
Il Sole 24 Ore	103,693	Milan	1865	Liberalism
Avvenire	91,833	Milan	1968	Christian democracy
Il Fatto Quotidiano	68,166	Rome	2009	Left-wing populism
La Stampa	60,883	Turin	1867	Progressivism
Il Giornale	24,512	Milan	1974	Liberal conservatism
La Verità	21,261	Milan	2016	Right-wing populism
Libero	16,412	Milan	2000	Liberal conservatism
Il manifesto	15,408	Rome	1969	Socialism
Italia Oggi	12,604	Milan	1991	Liberal conservatism
QN Quotidiano Nazionale	n.a.	Milan	2026 (Note: Started as a consortium of newspapers in 1999, publication on its own since 2026)	Liberal conservatism
L'Unità	n.a.	Rome	1924	Social democracy
La Discussione	n.a.	Rome	1952	Christian democracy
MF Milano Finanza	n.a.	Milan	1989	Liberal conservatism
Il Foglio	n.a.	Rome	1996	Liberalism
L'Opinione delle Libertà	n.a.	Rome	1996	Liberalism
Il Riformista	n.a.	Rome	2002	Liberalism
La Notizia	n.a.	Rome	2013	Populism
Il Dubbio	n.a.	Rome	2016	Liberalism
Domani	n.a.	Rome	2020	Progressivism
La Ragione	n.a.	Rome	2021	Liberalism
L'Identità	n.a.	Rome	2022	Populism

== Regional/local ==
Listed according to circulation, updated to August 2026.

Newspaper	Circulation	Headquarters	Est.	Area
Il Messaggero	52,069	Rome	1878	Lazio, Marche, Umbria, Abruzzo
Il Resto del Carlino	44,927	Bologna	1885	Emilia-Romagna, Marche, southern Veneto
Il Gazzettino	37,603	Venice	1887	eastern Veneto, western Friuli-Venezia Giulia
La Nazione	28,277	Florence	1859	Tuscany, Umbria, eastern Liguria
Dolomiten	27,287	Bolzano	1882	South Tyrol
L'Eco di Bergamo	24,294	Bergamo	1880	Province of Bergamo (Lombardy)
L'Unione Sarda	22,644	Cagliari	1889	Sardinia
Messaggero Veneto	21,261	Udine	1946	western Friuli-Venezia Giulia
Il Mattino	18,774	Naples	1892	Campania
Giornale di Brescia	18,620	Brescia	1945	Province of Brescia (Lombardy)
Gazzetta di Parma	17,883	Parma	1735	Province of Parma (Emilia-Romagna)
Il Secolo XIX	17,082	Genoa	1886	Liguria, southern Piedmont
L'Adige	16,979	Trento	1945	South Tyrol
La Nuova Sardegna	15,591	Sassari	1891	Sardinia
L'Arena	14,826	Verona	1866	Province of Verona (Veneto)
Il Giornale di Vicenza	14,704	Vicenza	1915	Province of Vicenza (Veneto)
L'Edicola	13,888	Bari	2021	Apulia, Basilicata
Il Tirreno	13,339	Livorno	1877	Tuscany
Libertà	12,050	Piacenza	1883	Province of Piacenza (Emilia-Romagna)
Il Giorno	11,373	Milan	1956	Lombardy
Quotidiano di Sicilia	10,919	Catania	1979	Sicily
La Provincia	10,877	Como	1892	northern Lombardy
Il Piccolo	10,526	Trieste	1881	eastern Friuli-Venezia Giulia
Gazzetta di Mantova	9,096	Mantua	1664	Province of Mantua (Lombardy)
Il Mattino di Padova	8,536	Padua	1978	Province of Padua (Veneto)
La Provincia di Cremona	8,158	Cremona	1947	Province of Cremona (Lombardy)
Il Tempo	7,901	Rome	1944	Lazio, Umbria
Corriere Adriatico	7,490	Ancona	1860	Marche
Alto Adige	7,142	Bolzano	1945	South Tyrol
Gazzetta del Sud	6,491	Messina	1952	north-western Sicily, Calabria
La Gazzetta del Mezzogiorno	6,403	Bari	1887	Apulia
Il Centro	6,373	Pescara	1986	Abruzzo
Quotidiano di Puglia	5,816	Lecce	1979	southern Apulia
La Sicilia	5,398	Catania	1945	Sicily
La Tribuna di Treviso	5,255	Treviso	1978	Province of Treviso (Veneto)
La Provincia Pavese	4,958	Pavia	1879	Province of Pavia (Lombardy)
Gazzetta di Reggio	4,425	Reggio Emilia	1860	Province of Reggio Emilia (Emilia-Romagna)
Gazzetta di Modena	4,418	Modena	1859	Province of Modena (Emilia-Romagna)
La Nuova Venezia	3,916	Venice	1978	Metropolitan City of Venice (Veneto)
Giornale di Sicilia	3,784	Palermo	1860	Sicily
Corriere delle Alpi	3,655	Belluno	1978	Province of Belluno (Veneto)
La Nuova Ferrara	3,438	Ferrara	1989	Province of Ferrara (Emilia-Romagna)
Corriere dell'Umbria	2,753	Perugia	1983	Umbria
Bresciaoggi	n.a.	Brescia	1974	Province of Brescia (Lombardy)
Editoriale Oggi	n.a.	Frosinone	1988	Lazio
Trentino	n.a.	Trento	1945	Trentino
Il T	n.a.	Trento	2022	Trentino
Roma	n.a.	Naples	1862	Campania
Neue Südtiroler Tageszeitung	n.a.	Bolzano	1996	South Tyrol
Il Quotidiano del Sud	n.a.	Castrolibero	1995	Calabria, Basilicata, Campania
La Voce di Rovigo	n.a.	Rovigo	2004	Province of Rovigo (Veneto)
Primorski dnevnik	n.a.	Trieste	1945	Slovene minority in Friuli-Venezia Giulia

== Sports ==
Listed according to circulation, updated to August 2026.

Newspaper	Circulation	Headquarters	Est.
La Gazzetta dello Sport	111,315 (Note: 113,524 on Mondays.)	Milan	1896
Corriere dello Sport	34,355 (Note: 50,086 on Mondays.)	Rome	1924
Tuttosport	22,224 (Note: 19,803 on Mondays.)	Turin	1945

== Publishers ==
Some media companies publish several newspapers, ordered by cumulative circulation:

- RCS MediaGroup – Corriere della Sera, La Gazzetta dello Sport
- Caltagirone Editore – Il Messaggero, Il Gazzettino, Il Mattino, Corriere Adriatico, Quotidiano di Puglia
- GEDI Gruppo Editoriale (Antenna Group) – La Repubblica
- Gruppo SAE – La Stampa, La Nuova Sardegna, Il Tirreno, La Provincia Pavese, Gazzetta di Reggio, Gazzetta di Modena, La Nuova Ferrara
- Editoriale Nazionale – QN Quotidiano Nazionale, Il Resto del Carlino, La Nazione, Il Giorno
- Nord Est Multimedia – Messaggero Veneto, Il Piccolo, Il Mattino di Padova, La Tribuna di Treviso, La Nuova Venezia, Corriere delle Alpi
- Gruppo Amodei – Corriere dello Sport, Tuttosport
- Finanziaria Tosinvest – Il Giornale, Libero, Il Tempo
- Gruppo Athesis – L'Arena, Il Giornale di Vicenza, Gazzetta di Mantova, Bresciaoggi
- Società Editrice Santi Alessandro, Ambrogio, Bassiano – L'Eco di Bergamo, La Provincia
- Società Iniziative Editoriali – L'Adige, Alto Adige
- Blue Media – Il Secolo XIX
- Class Editori – Italia Oggi, MF Milano Finanza
- Società Editoriale Siciliana – Gazzetta del Sud, Giornale di Sicilia
- Domenico Sanfilippo Editore – La Gazzetta del Mezzogiorno, La Sicilia
- Romeo Editore – L'Unità, Il Riformista

== See also ==
- List of magazines in Italy
- Mass media in Italy
- Telecommunications in Italy
- List of Italian telephone companies
- Television in Italy
- List of television channels in Italy
- List of radio stations in Italy
- Internet in Italy
- Censorship in Italy
- Italian Periodical Press Union
