= Cinzia Sasso =

Italian journalist and writer (born 1956)

- Born: 25 August 1956 (age 69); Venice, Italy
- Occupations: Italian journalist and writer
- Website: Blog of the author of repubblica.it

Cinzia Sasso (born 25 August 1956, in Venice) is an Italian journalist and writer.

== Early life ==
Sasso graduated with honors in International Political Science from the University of Padua.

== Career ==
A professional journalist since 1982, she began working in the local newspapers: Gruppo Editoriale L'Espresso: Il Mattino di Padova, La Tribuna di Treviso and La Nuova Venezia.

In 1985 Sasso joined La Repubblica, covering long cases in news and judicial policy, then women and careers.

Sasso is part of the steering committee of the "School of Journalism Walter Tobagi" of the University of Milan.

== Personal life ==
After living together for twenty years, Sasso married lawyer and politician Giuliano Pisapia 9 April 2011, with a civil wedding in the Palazzo Cavalli in Venice.

== Works ==
- I saccheggiatori. Milano: facevano i politici, ma erano dei ladri, with Giuseppe Turani, Sperling & Kupfer, (1992)
- Donne che amano il lavoro e la vita. La via femminile al successo, Sperling & Kupfer, (2002)
- Un'ora sola io vorrei, with Susanna Zucchelli, Sperling & Kupfer (2005)
