= Luca Goldoni =

Italian writer (1928–2023)

- Born: 23 February 1928; Parma, Italy
- Died: 7 October 2023 (aged 95); Bologna, Italy

Luca Goldoni (23 February 1928 – 7 October 2023) was an Italian writer and journalist.

== Life and career ==
Born in Parma, Goldoni started his career as a journalist at Gazzetta di Parma and Il Resto del Carlino. Later, he collaborated with numerous publications, notably Corriere della Sera, Il Giorno, La Nazione, Oggi, Airone and TV Sorrisi e Canzoni. Beyond journalism, Goldoni was also an essayist, whose books mainly focused on the history and the mores of Italians and which were characterized by a satirical and humorous style. His books sold over 3 million copies.

Goldoni died on 7 October 2023, at the age of 95.
