= Domenico Bartoli =

Italian journalist and essayist (1912–1989)

Domenico Bartoli (3 March 1912 - 9 July 1989) was an Italian journalist and essayist. In 1960 he became the director of Il Resto del Carlino, a Bologna-based mass-circulation daily newspaper, remaining in the position for ten years.

== Biography ==
Bartoli was born at Turin. His journalistic career started in 1933 when he joined the Corriere della Sera. The next year the papers sent him to report from China. Then, "due to the complication of the political situation" he was replaced in China, after a brief hiatus, by Luigi Barzini Jr. Instead Bartoli was now sent to report on the Italo-Abyssinian War. After the conclusion of that war, he worked as a war correspondent on a succession of assignments, notably in central Africa, till 1943. Perhaps his greatest scoop concerned a domestic matter, however. On 24 July 1943, the Grand Council met in the anteroom of Mussolini's office in the Palazzo Venezia. For the first time in the history of the Grand Council, neither the leader's "musketeers", nor any detachment of the "M" battalions were present. Mussolini did not want a stenographer, so no minutes were taken. A remarkably detailed report of the momentous meeting, which had ended in Mussolini's removal from power, was nevertheless made public on the front page of the Corriere della Sera a few days later. The name at the foot of the report was that of Domenico Bartoli. It later became clear that Bartoli had for many years enjoyed access to high level contacts among the monarchist and military elements in the Italian establishment, and he must have used these to prepare his report. Commentators were not all slow to point out the irony that a journalist who for twenty years been trusted by senior movers and shakers of fascist Italy was now the first to report the leader's downfall.

Following the Fall of the Fascist regime, 1943, Domenico Bartoli was a co-founder with Mario Pannunzio (and others) of a new Rome-based daily newspaper, the Risorgimento Liberale. The early years were difficult: after the events of 8 September 1943, which ushered in a partition of Italy, it became necessary to print the paper clandestinely. Only after allied troops liberated Rome on 4 June 1944 did regular daily publication resume. Still with the Corriere, between 1951 and 1956 he was based in London as the paper's correspondent there. One outcome of his lengthy stay in the English capital was a long thoughtful essay about the country, informed by a certain liberal perspective: "L'Inghilterra senza impero" ("England without the empire"). He then switch to the Turin-based national daily newspaper, La Stampa, reporting till 1960 from Paris. His next journalistic posting was to Bologna where, in succession to Giovanni Spadolini he worked as editor-in-chief at Il Resto del Carlino, another venerable daily newspaper of the Italian centre-right. During his time in charge the designer Giuseppe Trevisani was employed to provide a completely new look for the newspaper in order to make it suitable for publication using a modern offset printing system.

While Enzo Biagi took over control at the Resto del Carlino, in 1970 Bartoli was appointed editor-director at La Nazione in succession to Enrico Mattei, remaining in post for slightly under 7 years. During this period he also wrote regularly for the mass-circulation weekly magazine Epoca, in which his contributions appeared in a column headed "L'Italia allo specchio" (loosely, "Mirror on Italy").
