= Franco Bomprezzi =

Italian journalist and writer

Franco Bomprezzi (1 August 1952 – 18 December 2014) was an Italian journalist and writer.

Born in Florence, Bomprezzi was born with osteogenesis imperfecta. Among other things, he was also chief editor for RAI, he worked for the newspapers Mattino di Padova" and Il Resto del Carlino, and was director of the journal DM and of the magazine Mobilità. He appeared in the short-film Solo Cinque Minuti or Just Five Minutes with Valeria Golino. He was a member of Vodafone Italia Foundation's scientific committee and spokesman of the Ledha-League for the Rights of Persons with Disabilities. He received the Order of Merit in 2007.

== Biography ==
Suffering from birth from Osteogenesis imperfecta, which would lead him to live and work in a wheelchair, he followed the movements of his military father, completing his studies in Florence, Chieti, Rovigo and Padua. He was news chief at Il Mattino di Padova for many years; he also worked with the editorial staff of il Resto del Carlino, before moving to Milan, where he held the position of central editor-in-chief at AGR.

He collaborated with several thematic publications, dealing with the difficulties of disabled people. He was editor in chief of DM, a periodical of UILDM, as well as editor of Mobility magazine, which ceased publication at the end of 2008. He was the founder of the portal Superando.it and spokesman for Ledha, the League for the Rights of Persons with Disabilities.

Responsible for social communication for the Telethon Fondazione Onlus Committee for years, he also joined the scientific committee of the Vodafone Italia Foundation.

In 2005 he was awarded the Ambrogino d'oro. In 2007 he was appointed a knight of the Republic by President Giorgio Napolitano. In 2009, he stood in the 2009 provincial elections in Milan on the list that supported Filippo Penati candidacy for president of the province: he obtained 637 votes, which proved insufficient for his election. In the run-up to the 2011 municipal elections in Milan, he ran for city council on the Milano Civica X Pisapia Sindaco list, praising Pisapia himself for his attention to people with disabilities: on that occasion he obtained 344 preferences, which did not allow him to enter Palazzo Marino.

He died at Niguarda Hospital in Milan, where he had been hospitalized for some time, from a Pulmonary embolism. He had been a widower for many years to Nadia, who died in 2003, also with a disability and in a wheelchair.
