= Mino Milani =

Italian writer, cartoonist, and historian (1928–2022)

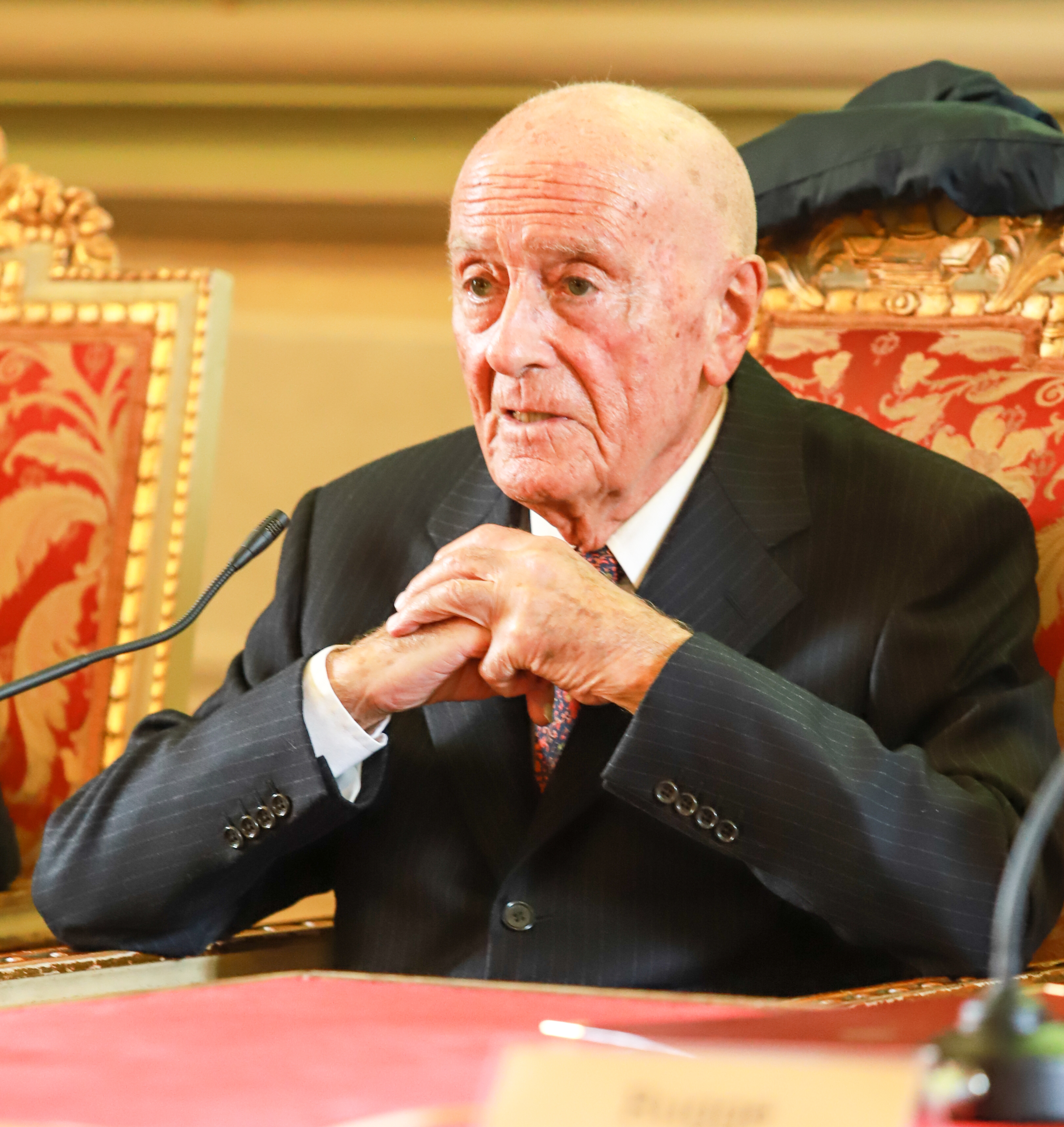
- Milani in 2018
- Born: 3 February 1928; Pavia, Italy
- Died: 10 February 2022 (aged 94); Pavia, Italy
- Other names: Stelio Martelli; Eugenio Ventura; Piero Selva; Mungo Graham Alcesti; T. Maggio
- Occupations: Writer, cartoonist and historian
- Employer(s): La Provincia Pavese (editor-in-chief); Corriere della Sera; La Domenica del Corriere
- Notable work: Melchiorre Ferrari novels Tommy River; Fantasma d'amore Corriere dei Piccoli; Corriere dei Ragazzi
- Awards: Yellow Kid Award, 1971

Mino Milani (3 February 1928 – 10 February 2022) was an Italian writer, cartoonist, journalist and historian. During his career he also used several pseudonyms, including Stelio Martelli, Eugenio Ventura, Piero Selva, Mungo Graham Alcesti and T. Maggio.

== Life and career ==
Born in Pavia, Milani debuted as a writer in 1952 and wrote over two hundred books, spanning children's and adult novels, collections of short stories, biographies and historical books. Among his best known works are the giallo-crime novel cycle featuring police commissioner Melchiorre Ferrari, the series of western novels Tommy River, and Fantasma d'amore, a novel adapted into a film with the same name by Dino Risi, starring Marcello Mastroianni and Romy Schneider. Milani was also well known as a comic writer, mainly active for Corriere dei Piccoli and Corriere dei Ragazzi, whose collaborations include Hugo Pratt, Milo Manara, Sergio Toppi, Dino Battaglia, Aldo Di Gennaro, Arturo del Castillo, Mario Uggeri, Grazia Nidasio, and Attilio Micheluzzi.

As a journalist, Milano worked for important publications such as Corriere della Sera and La Domenica del Corriere, and was editor-in-chief of the daily newspaper La Provincia Pavese. He died in Pavia on 10 February 2022, at the age of 94.
