= Sheila McKinnon =

Canadian-born photographer and journalist

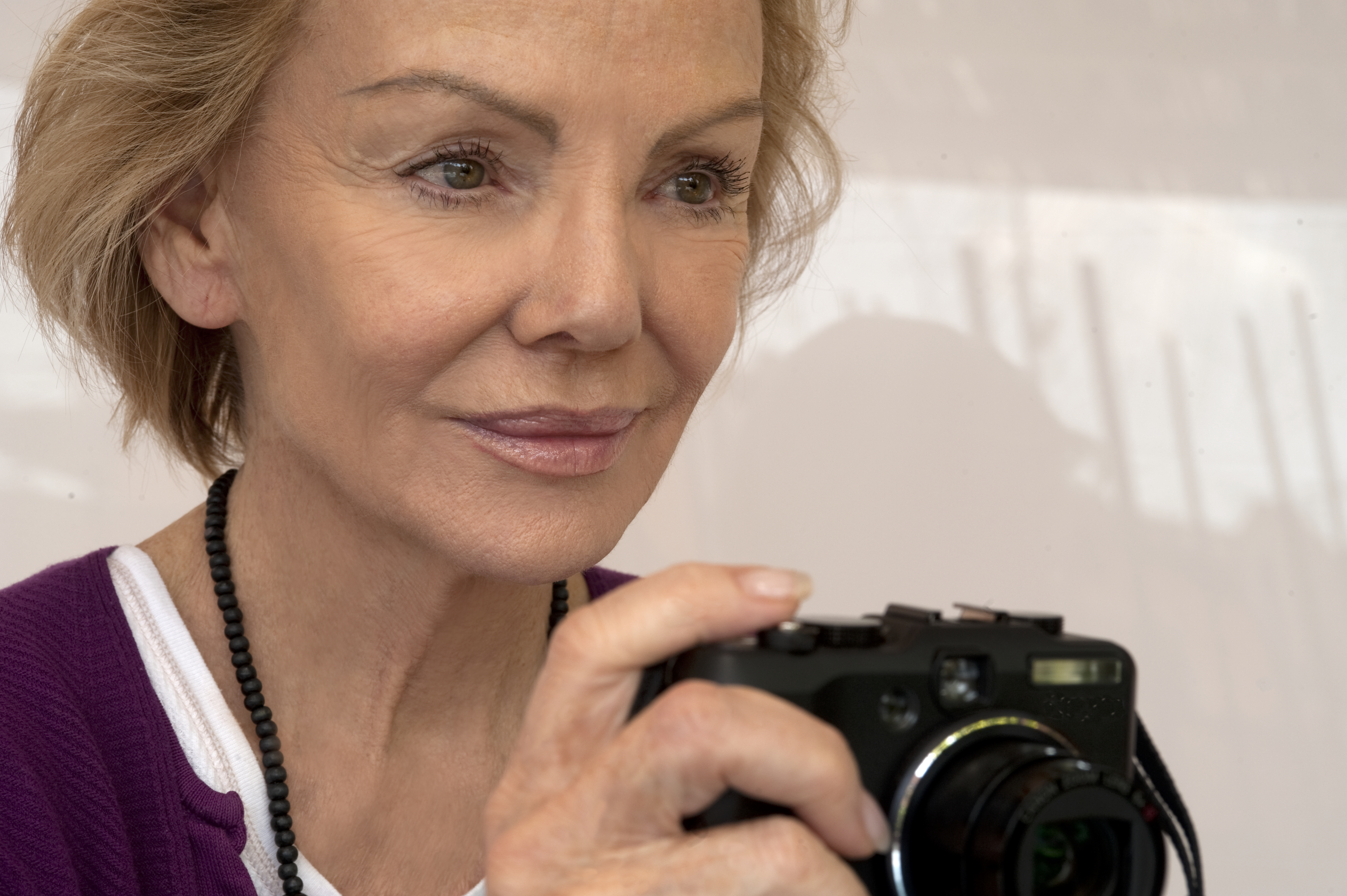
- McKinnon in 2010
- Alma mater: Wellesley College; University of Toronto
- Website: sheilamckinnon.com

Sheila McKinnon is a Canadian-born photographer and journalist who has lived most of her life in Italy. She has worked in Africa, Asia and Europe for The New York Times, Newsweek, Die Welt, Condé Nast, the International Herald Tribune, the Los Angeles Times, the Carnegie Foundation, the Knight Foundation, Saveur magazine, The Globe and Mail and other international and Italian publications including la Repubblica, il Messaggero, Corriere della Sera, l’Espresso, Panorama, Gente, Oggi, Artribune, Arte.it, Skytg 24, La Sapienza, Quotidiano di Sicilia, photographers.it, Kyotoclub.it, Mywhere.it.

McKinnon has worked in collaboration with various humanitarian organizations and UN agencies such as UNICEF, the FAO, UNFPA, IDLO, La Comunità di Sant’Egidio, Africare, and others. For 20 years her photography focused on the rights of children, of girls and of women. More recently the subject of her work has been Climate Change.

== Exhibitions ==
- 1999 - On Their Side, a photographic exhibition created with UNICEF, Italy, on the rights of the child was first presented in Rome in 1999 at the Palazzo delle Esposizioni and later was seen in cultural institutions and civic spaces throughout the peninsula.
- 2006–2008 - Invisible Women, an exhibition of women in the developing world was inaugurated in Rome and presented in various Italian cities 2006 – 2008.
- 2009 - Invisible Women and the Environment, hosted by the Italian Ministry of the Environment on the occasion of the pre G8 meetings in Syracuse, Sicily, in April 2009.
- 2011 - Born Invisible, at the Doge's Palace, Genoa, Italy, 4-20 February 2011.
- 2014 - Invisible Women, at the FAO Gender network conference, Rome, March 4, 2014.
- 2014 - Born Invisible, at the Museum of Rome in Trastevere, June 5 – September 28, 2014.
- 2015 - Born Invisible, at the Robert F. Kennedy Int House, Florence, May 2015.
- 2018 - Invisible Light, at the Sala del Cenacolo, Camera dei Deputati, Italian Govt. Rome, 2018.

== Selected publications ==
- 1985 - Anna, Ciro & Compagnia, published by ERI – RAI – Italy 1985.
- Harrison, Barbara Grizzuti (1991). The Islands of Italy. New York: Houghton Mifflin. ISBN 978-0-395-59302-8. (Photographer).
- Lodi, Donata; McKinnon, Sheila (1999). On their side. Dalla parte dei bambini. Compagnia Nuove Indye. ISBN 978-88-87735-00-0.
- Feick, Posy Chisholm (2002). The Sacred Fire. ISBN 978-88-87666-02-1. (Photographer).
- McKinnon, Sheila (2006). Invisible Women. Roma: Shenker. ISBN 978-88 748-9000-2.
- 2011 - Born Invisible, was presented by the Fondazione Edoardo Garrone at the Palazzo Ducale in Genoa, Italy, February 3, 2011.
- McKinnon, Sheila (2014). Born Invisible. Roma: Gangemi. ISBN 978-88-492-2868-7.
