= Matteo Pizzigallo =

Italian writer, essayist and academic (1950–2018)

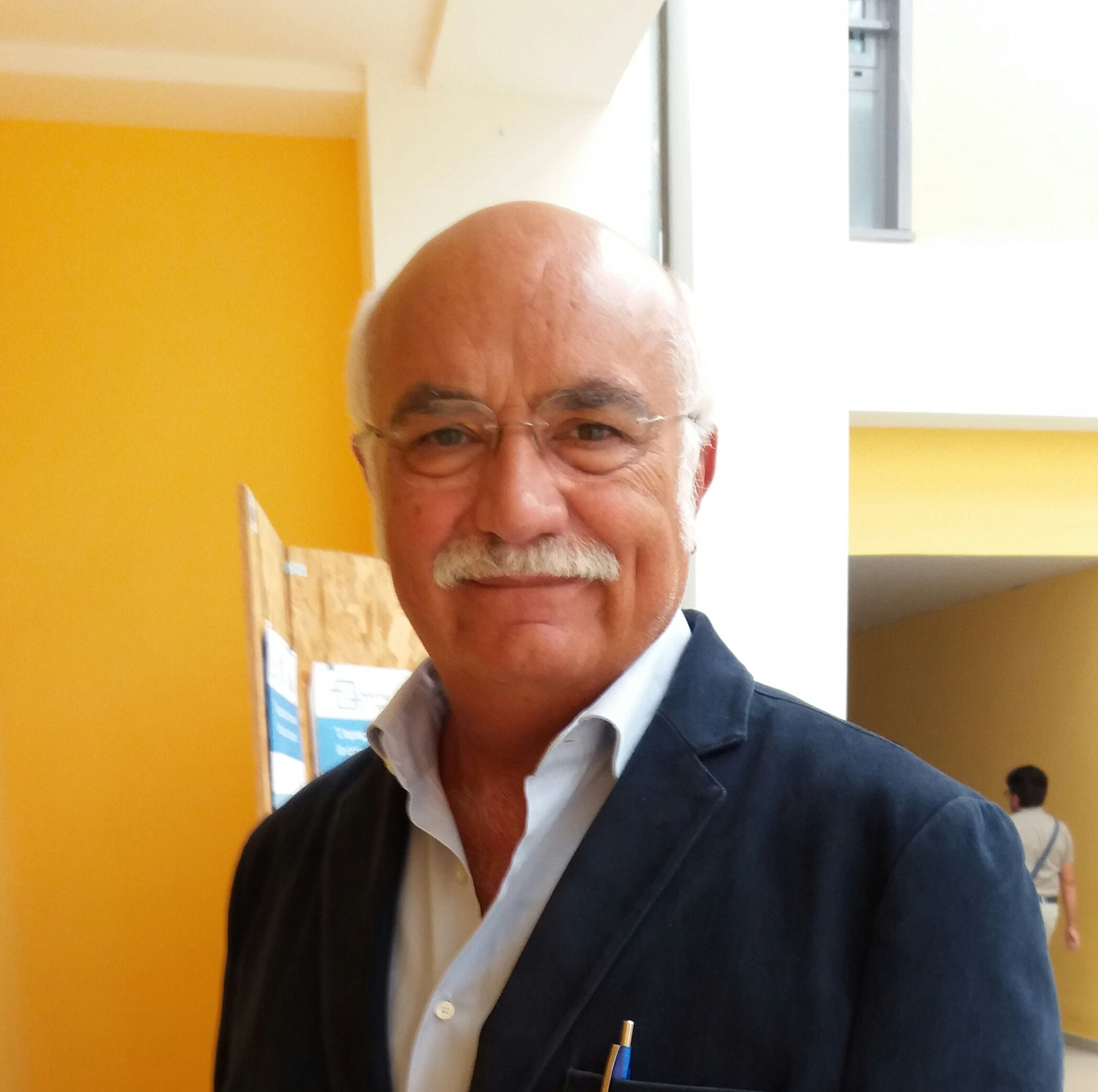
Matteo Pizzigallo

Matteo Pizzigallo (Martina Franca 17 July 1950 – Rome 19 July 2018) was an Italian essayist and historian. He attended La Sapienza University in Rome and graduated in 1972.

== Biography ==
He was a pupil of Renato Mori, famous historian of the Ethiopia war. He was also in the group of the assistant professors of Aldo Moro, the Italian statesman, killed by the Brigate Rosse and that remembered him and the other young colleagues in his last letters written when he was imprisoned. He was full professor of History of Political Parties and Movements, and also of History of International Relations at the University of Naples “Federico II”, at the Accademia Aeronautica of Pozzuoli and at LUMSA University of Rome. Scholar of Economic Diplomacy and Euro-Arab relations, he was the author of several monographs and essays translated also in English and Arabic. He dealt with the Italian foreign policy, with the Italian oil policy in the 1920s and after the Second World War. He dealt with the Italian relations with the countries of the southern shore of the Mediterranean supporting the diplomacy of “friendship”. He was a commentator on RAI TG1-Unomattina, Rai Parlamento, Radio Vaticana and La Gazzetta del Mezzogiorno. He was a founding member of the Italian Society of International History (SISI).

== Bibliography ==
- Alle origini della politica petrolifera italiana, Roma, 1980, Giuffrè Editore
- Mediterraneo e Russia nella politica italiana, Roma, 1983, Giuffrè Editore
- L'Agip degli anni ruggenti, Roma, 1984, Giuffrè Editore
- La politica estera dell'Agip, Roma, 1992, Giuffrè Editore
- Le risorse energetiche dalla stabilità alla crisi petrolifera, in V. Castronovo, Storia dell'economia mondiale, pp. 98–128, Roma-Bari, 2000, Laterza, ISBN 978-8842062172.
- Disarmo navale e Turchia nella politica italiana 1921–1922. Napoli, 2004, ESI, ISBN 978-8849507591.
- La diplomazia dell'amicizia. Italia e Arabia Saudita, Napoli, 2004, ESI, ISBN 88-495-0044-0, RIYAD: Fondazione Re IBN SAUD (2005) in arabo.
- L'Italia e il riconoscimento della repubblica siriana, 2004, CLIO, p. 633-651, ISSN 0391-6731
- L'Italia e il mediterraneo orientale (1946-1950), Milano, 2004, Franco Angeli, ISBN 978-8846460561.
- Amicizie mediterranee e interesse nazionale (1946-1954), vol. 1, pp. 1–223, Milano, 2006, Franco Angeli, ISBN 978-8846482792.
- L'economia ionica e la nascita dell'Italsider di Taranto, in R. Nistri, Taranto, pp. 39–88, Taranto, 2007, Mandese Editore, ISBN 978-8853502636.
- Diplomazia parallela e politica petrolifera italiana, in M.De Leonardis, Il mediterraneo nella politica estera italiana, pp. 141–160, Bologna, 2007, Il Mulino, ISBN 978-8815094872.
- La diplomazia italiana e i paesi Arabi dell'oriente mediterraneo, Milano, 2008, Franco Angeli, ISBN 978-8856804096.
- Cooperazione e relazioni internazionali. Milano, 2008, Franco Angeli, ISBN 9788856802740.
- Le risorse energetiche dalla stabilità alla crisi petrolifera, in V. Castronovo, Storia della economia mondiale, vol. 10, pp. 455–470, Roma, Bari, Milano, 2009, Gius. Laterza e figli / Il sole 24 ore s.p.a., ISBN 978-1827965383.
- Storie rimosse. Studi sulla nascita delle impresse pubbliche, Napoli, 2010, Pisanti Editore, ISBN 978-8888584225.
- Le origini di una grande amicizia: Mattei e Marcora negli anni della Resistenza, in E. Bernardi, Giovanni Marcora, pp. 50–61, Soveria Mannelli, 2010, Rubbettino, ISBN 978-8849827590.
- Il Ponte sul Mediterraneo, le relazioni fra l'Italia e i Paesi Arabi rivieraschi (1989-2009), Roma, 2011, Editrice Apes, ISBN 978-8872330661.
- L'Italia e le monarchie petrolifere del golfo (1991-2011), Roma, 2012, Editrice Apes srl, doi: 10.978.887233/0890
- La politica Araba dell'Italia democristiana. Studi e ricerche sugli anni Cinquanta, Milano, 2013, Franco Angeli Editore, ISBN 978-8856845938.
- History of an 80-Year-long friendship: Italy-Saudi Arabia 1932–2012, in S. Colombo (a cura di), Italy and Saudi Arabia confronting the challenges of the XXI century, p. 17-37, Roma, 2013, Edizioni Nuova Cultura, ISBN 978-8868121518.
- Sulla via di Samarcanda. Le relazioni fra l'Italia e le Repubbliche ex sovietiche dell'Asia Centrale, pp. 1–120, Roma, 2014, Bordeaux Edizioni, ISBN 978-8897236733.
- Una buona politica estera. Italia e Paesi Arabi. Studi e ricerche, Roma, 2015, Ed srl, ISBN 978-8897236924.
- Dieci anni come un secolo: un'ipotesi di lettura critica, in E. Ferragina (a cura di), Rapporto sulle economie del Mediterraneo 2015, p. 19-31, Bologna, Società editrice il Mulino, ISBN 978-8815258205.
- "The Bastion with clay feet": Italian diplomacy and the Baghdad Pact. in L. Ratti, P. Wulzer (a cura di), Case Studies in International Security, Berna, 2018, Peter Lang, ISBN 978-3034326568.

== Other websites ==
- Uno mattina, Matteo Pizzigallo
