= Maria Santissima Immacolata, Longuelo =

Church building in Longuelo, Italy

Coordinates: 45°41′36.00″N 9°37′52.00″E

Maria Santissima Immacolata is a Modern style, Roman Catholic church located on Via Guglielmo Mattioli 57 in the neighborhood of Longuelo in Bergamo, region of Lombardy, Italy.

== History ==
The church was erected in 1961–1965 to designs by Giuseppe (Pino) Pizzigoni. The shape has been described as a "Hyperbolic-paraboloid shell".

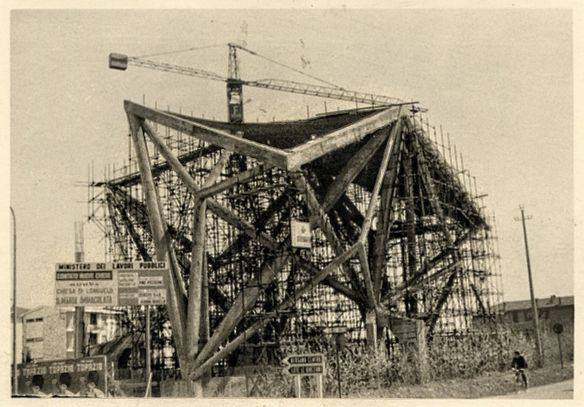
Construction of church Longuelo (1961–1966)

The church is built with reinforced cement. The geometrical arrangement is described as four autonomous volumes, knitted together by five roofs, also made with thin 6 cm cement. Four of the roofs have double curvatures, while the main central roof is a steep parabolic tent like design.

Monsignor Andrea Spada, director of the journal L'Eco di Bergamo, said of the building in 1966:

The architect wanted to lay it on the edge of the road with all the naked violence of his architectural motifs, as able of blocking the attention of passersby. If that was the case, it is undoubtedly successful. That tangle of tormented, baroque, and immense empty sockets; of sails that stretch out like monstrous auricles; can lend themselves to the easy irony and jokes, but undoubtedly no passes without feeling a shock. Even the outside of this church speaks without doubts, indeed it cries, possessing its mighty voice, though also cavernous, harsh and hard.

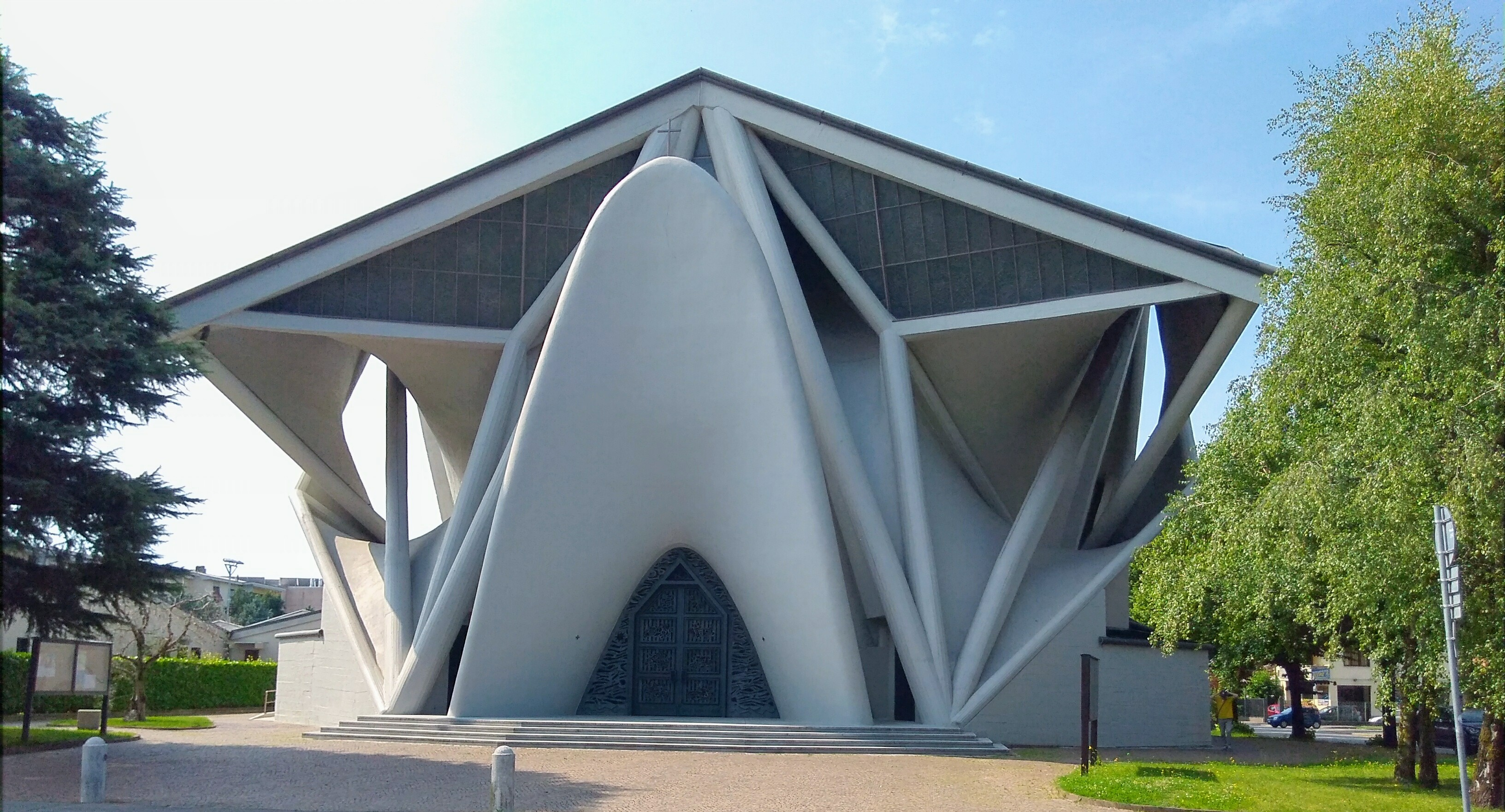

The interior has stained glass windows by Mino Marra, and a tabernacle by Claudio Nani. The sole sculpture is a large bas-relief in the presbytery depicting the Virgin. To loosely quote Spada again:

Here we are under reinforced concrete in an atmosphere that deprives us of indulgence. Its sincerity is absolute, we must acknowledge this but also its aridity and coldness. It is difficult to avoid the impression of being in a splendid monumental bunker.

In 2015–2016, the church underwent restoration.
