= La Nuova Ferrara =

Italian daily newspaper

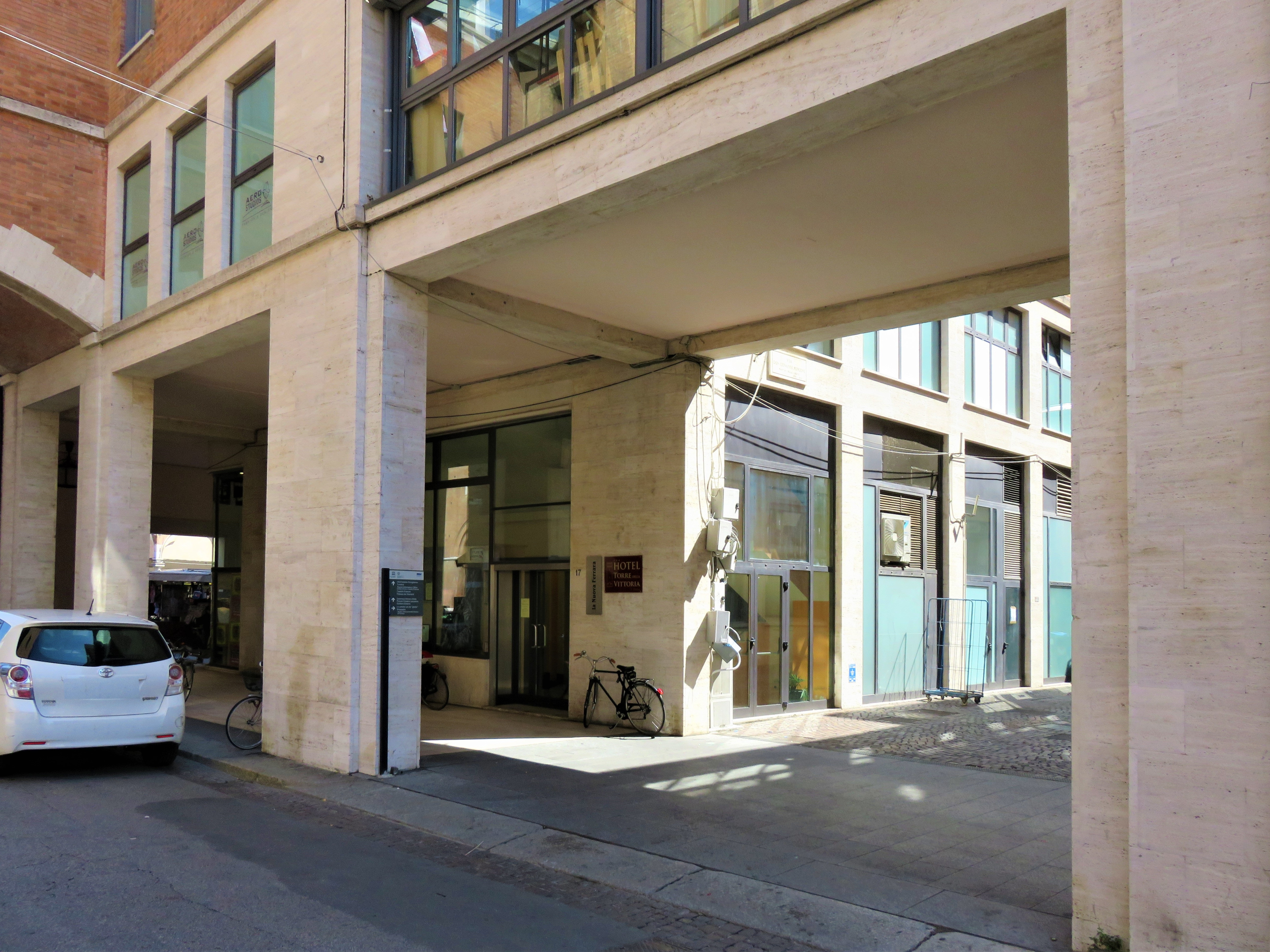
- Entrance of the editorial office in Ferrara
- Type: Daily newspaper
- Format: Berliner
- Owner: Gruppo SAE S.p.A.
- Founder: Enrico Pirondini
- Editor-in-chief: Davide Berti
- Founded: 5 April 1989; 37 years ago
- Language: Italian
- Headquarters: Ferrara, Italy
- ISSN: 1590-9891
- Website: lanuovaferrara.it

La Nuova Ferrara (Italian pronunciation: [la ˈnwɔːva ferˈraːra]; lit. 'The New Ferrara') is an Italian daily newspaper based in Ferrara. It is owned by Gruppo SAE.

== History ==
La Nuova Ferrara was founded by Enrico Pirondini. Its first issue was published on 5 April 1989. Originally owned by GEDI Gruppo Editoriale, it was sold to Gruppo SAE in 2020, along with the Gazzetta di Modena, the Gazzetta di Reggio, and Il Tirreno. In February 2024, La Nuova Ferrara, along with other Emilia-Romagnan newspapers, announced that they would be dedicating more of their print content to local news.

== Notable personnel ==
- Giacomo Bedeschi
- Maria Rosa Bellini
- Davide Berti
- Paolo Boldrini
- Rino Bulbarelli
- Alberto Faustini
- Cristiano Meoni
- Valentino Pesci
- Enrico Pirondini
- Stefano Scansani
- Luciano Tancredi
- Luca Traini
