= Bomprezzi =

Bomprezzi is an Italian surname. Notable people with the surname include:

- Franco Bomprezzi (1952–2014), Italian journalist and writer
- Roberto Bomprezzi (born 1962), Italian modern pentathlete
