= Assante =

Assante may refer to:

- Assanté, a town and arrondissement in the Collines department of Benin
- Armand Assante (born 1949), American actor
- Assante Wealth Management, a Canadian company now owned by CI Financial
- Ernesto Assante (1958–2024), Italian music critic
- Orion Assante, a character in the Grendel comic book series
- Salvatore "Turtle" Assante, a character in the HBO television series Entourage
