= GEDI Gruppo Editoriale =

Italian media conglomerate

- Formerly: Gruppo Editoriale L'Espresso (1955–2017)
- Type: società per azioni
- Industry: Publisher
- Founded: 1955
- Headquarters: Turin, Italy
- Area served: Italy
- Key people: John Elkann (chairman); Carlo Perrone (vice-chairman); Maurizio Scanavino (CEO and general manager)
- Products: Mass media; Magazines; Newspapers; Radio; Television; Web portals; Advertising; Education
- Parent: Exor
- Website: gedispa.it

GEDI Gruppo Editoriale S.p.A., formerly known as Gruppo Editoriale L'Espresso S.p.A., is an Italian media conglomerate. Founded in 1955, it is based in Turin, Italy, and controlled by the Agnelli family through Exor. The company is known for publishing newspapers la Repubblica and La Stampa.

== History ==
=== Origins ===
In 2009, the group L'Espresso created an online advertising consortium with RCS MediaGroup.

In March 2016, the Italiana Editrice (owner of La Stampa and controlled by FCA) merged with L'Espresso group (owner of la Repubblica) to create the leading Italian group in print and online information. As a result CIR (owned by the Benedetti family) remained the majority shareholder, with FCA and Carlo Perrone as minority shareholders.

In March 2026, the K Group that owns Antenna Group, announced the acquisition of 100% of the GEDI Gruppo Editoriale from Exor, including the newspaper la Repubblica. The head of the Antenna Group (Greece's biggest media company), media magnate Theodore Kyriakou bid to purchase GEDI with funds partially financed by Saudi Arabia's sovereign wealth fund, which is controlled by Saudi Crown Prince Mohammed bin Salman. A report in 2021 noted that Saudi Crown Prince Mohammed bin Salman ordered the killing of journalist Jamal Khashoggi.

=== Name change ===
In May 2017, the group changed its names from Gruppo Editoriale L'Espresso to GEDI Gruppo Editoriale. In July 2017, FCA distributed its stake to shareholders, making the Agnelli Family (through Exor) minority shareholders with a 4.26% stake.

In December 2019, the board of CIR accepted Exor's offer to buy its 43.78% stake in GEDI. This operation restored the Agnelli family to majority ownership of La Stampa, which they had already controlled from 1926 to 2016, through FIAT (then FCA).

Following a tender offer, GEDI was 100% controlled by Giano Holding Spa, which was in turn controlled by Exor (90% stake). After Giano bought all shares of GEDI, the company was delisted from the Borsa Italiana. Compagnie Industriali Riunite and Carlo Perrone own a minority share in Giano, 5% each.

== Description ==
- Newspapers:
  - 100,000 to 150,000 copies: la Repubblica
  - 50,000 to 100,000 copies: La Stampa
  - 5,000 to 10,000 copies: La Provincia Pavese, La Sentinella del Canavese
- Online newspapers: Huffington Post (Italian edition), Alfemminile, Mashable (Italian edition)
- Magazines: Limes, National Geographic Italia (Italian edition of National Geographic Magazine), Le Scienze (Italian edition of Scientific American), Mente & Cervello
- Radio stations: Radio DeeJay, Radio Capital, m2o
- Television channels: Repubblica Radio TV, Deejay TV, myDeejay, Onda Latina
- Web portals: Kataweb
- Advertising: A. Manzoni & C.
- Education: Somedia

=== Formerly owned ===
- Il Secolo XIX, ceded to Mediterranean Shipping Company in 2024
- Messaggero Veneto – Giornale del Friuli, Il Piccolo, Gazzetta di Mantova, Il Mattino di Padova, La Tribuna di Treviso, La Nuova Venezia and Corriere delle Alpi, ceded to NEM Group in 2023
- L'Espresso and Le Guide dell'Espresso ceded to BFC Group in 2022
- Il Tirreno, Gazzetta di Reggio, Gazzetta di Modena, La Nuova Ferrara and La Nuova Sardegna, ceded to SAE Group in 2020 and 2021
- MicroMega, closed in 2020 (later re-opened with a new ownership)
- Il Centro and La Città, ceded to local businessmen in 2017
- Alto Adige and Trentino, ceded to Athesia Group in 2017
