= VB33 =

Italian television channel

Video Bolzano 33
- Country: Italy
- Broadcast area: Alto Adige, Trentino

Ownership
- Owner: Telecolor SpA

History
- Launched: 1981

Links
- Website: www.video33.it

VB33, short for Video Bolzano 33, is an Italian general interest regional television channel serving the province of Bolzano. Since 2017, the channel's reach has expanded to include the province of Trento. Over the course of its history, it has also been called VideoBolzano Canale 33 and Video 33.

The channel was established in 1981 as a cooperative, and purchased in 1986 by it:Valerio Rolando Boesso, co-founder and publisher of the regional newspaper Alto Adige. Boesso integrated the channel into the new Italia 9 Network, of which he became the chairman in 1998, remaining in function until his death in 2008.
Journalist turned politician Lilli Gruber was one of the channel's on-air personalities early in her career.

Shortly before his death, Boesso sold VB33 to Bolzano-based investment fund Euregio Finance, who operated it under the corporate banner Rosengarten S.R.L.

The new investors launched a German-language sister channel, called Südtirol Digital Fernsehen (SDF), in 2009.

In 2020, VB33 was sold to Cremona-based media company Telecolor.

== Programming ==
- Hockey33 – Weekly talk show primarily dedicated to the ICEHL's Bolzano Foxes
- Hockey Night – Live ice hockey game broadcasts
