= Südtirol Digital Fernsehen =

- Country: Italy
- Broadcast area: South Tyrol

Ownership
- Owner: Telecolor SpA

History
- Launched: 28 October 2009

Links
- Website: www.sdf.bz.it

Südtirol Digital Fernsehen (SDF) was an Italian private television channel based in Bolzano (German: Bozen), in the autonomous province of South Tyrol (Italian: Alto Adige, German: Südtirol). It was the province's only private channel broadcast in German.
SDF was a general interest channel with a focus on hourly news. Local culture and sports also made a significant part of its programming.

The channel's main anchor was Magdalena Steiner, previously with German channel de:München TV. In 2015, the press reported that veteran Rai Südtirol anchor Jimmy Nussbaumer had privately submitted a plan to defect to SDF and use his professional connections to build the young channel into a direct competitor for his former employer, but his demands – which included a hefty salary and studio upgrades worth €3 million upfront – were deemed excessive.

The channel stopped broadcasting in September 2022. SDF has an Italian-language sister channel called VB33, which continues to broadcast.
