= Onda Latina =

- Country: Italy
- Broadcast area: Italy

Programming
- Language: Italian
- Picture format: 576i (4:3 SDTV)

Ownership
- Owner: Gruppo Editoriale L'Espresso
- Sister channels: myDeejay

History
- Launched: 31 July 2009; 16 years ago
- Closed: 28 December 2015; 10 years ago
- Replaced by: Onda Italiana

Links
- Website: http://www.ondalatina.it/

Availability

Terrestrial
- Digital: Channel 162

Streaming media
- website: http://www.ondalatina.it/index.php

Onda Latina was an Italian music television channel, mainly devoted to Latin American music (usually just in Spanish): Salsa, Merengue, Bachata, Reggaeton and Latin pop. It started on 31 July 2009 as a spin-off of the premium radio channel of the same name. Until 2012, it was available on Sky Italia as a pay-television service. After a brief closure, in 2013 the channel started airing again exclusively on free terrestrial TV, on channel 162. On 28 December 2015, the channel closed down and was replaced by Onda Italiana, a TV-station with Italian music.
