= Domani (newspaper) =

Italian newspaper

- Type: Daily newspaper
- Format: Tabloid
- Owner: Carlo De Benedetti
- Publisher: Editoriale Domani S.p.A.
- Editor: Emiliano Fittipaldi
- News editor: Mattia Ferraresi
- Founded: 15 September 2020
- Political alignment: Progressivism
- Language: Italian
- Headquarters: Via Barberini, 86 - 00187 Roma
- Country: Italy
- Circulation: 15,000 (as of October 2019)
- Website: editorialedomani.it

Domani is an Italian daily newspaper published in Rome. It was launched by Carlo De Benedetti, former publisher of la Repubblica, in the spring of 2020, after the latter had been sold by his sons to the Agnelli family and, in his view, had started to betray its legacy as Italy's progressive newspaper.

Domani was first published on 12 September 2020 and has since been edited by Stefano Feltri, former deputy editor of Il Fatto Quotidiano. According to Feltri, one month after its establishment, the newspapers was selling an average of 14,000 print copies per day and had 7,000+ digital subscribers.

Domani is controlled by Editoriale Domani SpA, a public limited company owned by De Benedetti, but will be given to a nonprofit foundation as soon as possible, in order to guarantee its independence and autonomy. At the end of October 2020, Luigi Zanda resigned from chairman of the publishing society because of conflict of interest with his role of senator of the Democratic Party (he had earlier resigned from party's treasurer in order to take the post), especially as the newspaper started to be very critical of the Second Conte Cabinet, of which the Democrats were junior partners. Zanda was replaced as chairman by Antonio Campo Dall'Orto.

== Controversies ==
In March 2023 Claudio Durigon, Undersecretary at the Ministry of Labour and Social Policies of the Meloni government filed a criminal complaint for defamation against Domani, following an article by journalists Giovanni Tizian and Nello Trocchia. Soon after that, the newspaper's headquarters were raided by the Carabinieri, who seized print copies of such article under the order of the Office of Prosecutors of Rome. The act was condemned by the European Federation of Journalists, the European Centre for Press and Media Freedom and the Italian National Press Federation.

== See also ==
- List of newspapers in Italy
