= Quotidiano.net =

Italian news website

- Website type: Online news website
- Available in: Italian
- Website: www.quotidiano.net
- Commercial: Yes
- Launched: 16 August 1999; 27 years ago
- Current status: Active

Quotidiano.net, marketed as Quotidiano Nazionale ("National Daily Newspaper") or simply QN, is an Italian news website launched in 1999 and owned by the publishing house Poligrafici Editoriale, whose print publications include the newspapers Il Giorno, il Resto del Carlino, and La Nazione. The website contains mainly Italian and International news coverage, as well as political, sports, and entertainment news. The website is also part of the Italian web syndication Italianews.
