= Sergio Lepri =

Italian journalist (1919–2022)

Sergio Lepri (24 September 1919 – 20 January 2022) was an Italian journalist. He was the editor of ANSA (National Associated Press Agency) from 1961 to 1990.

Lepri was born in Florence, Italy. He died in Rome, on 20 January 2022, at the age of 102.

== Publications ==
- Permesso, scusi, grazie - dialogo fra un cattolico fervente e un laico impenitente, scritto con Ettore Bernabei, Rai Eri, 2015.
- News, manuale di scrittura e di stile per l'informazione scritta e parlata, con prefazione di Tullio De Mauro, Rizzoli, 2011.
- 1943, Cronache di un anno, libro digitale, multimediale, ipertestuale e interattivo, in corso di scrittura dal 2009 sul sito www.sergiolepri.it .
- Manuale di linguaggio giornalistico, Etas, 1976 e 1983;
- Le macchine dell'informazione, Etas, 1984;
- Medium e messaggio. Il trattamento linguistico e concettuale dell'informazione, Gutenberg, 1986 e 1987 (Premio Fabbri 1987, Premio Campione 1988, Premio Prato Europa 1988);
- Scrivere bene e farsi capire, Gutenberg, 1988 e 1989;
- Professione giornalista, Etas, 1991, 1993; terza edizione ampliata e aggiornata 2005.
- Vademecum di giornalismo, ANSA, 1993;
- Mezzo secolo della nostra vita, Gutenberg; primo volume 1992, secondo volume 1993 (Premio Smau 1993), terzo volume 1994;
- Dizionario della comunicazione, Le Monnier, 1994;
- L'abc del giornalismo e Le agenzie di stampa in Studiare da giornalista, Ordine dei giornalisti, 1986, 1990, 1996;
- Dentro le notizie. Cinquant'anni di cronaca, storie e personaggi, Le Monnier, 1997;
- I sei mesi che hanno cambiato la Cina, Sugarco, 1979.
- with Francesco Arbitrio, Giuseppe Cultrera, Informazione e potere in un secolo di storia italiana. L'Agenzia Stefani da Cavour a Mussolini, Firenze, Le Monnier, 1999; 2001.
