= Repubblica TV =

Repubblica Radio TV
- Country: Italy
- Broadcast area: Italy
- Headquarters: Rome and Milan

Programming
- Language(s): Italian
- Picture format: 4:3 SDTV

Ownership
- Owner: Gruppo Editoriale L'Espresso

History
- Launched: April 10, 2006
- Closed: May 11, 2013

Links
- Website: http://www.repubblicatv.it/

Availability

Terrestrial
- Digital: DVB-T, LCN 29, Where available

Streaming media
- tv.repubblica.it: tv.repubblica.it

Repubblica TV, formerly Repubblica Radio TV, was an Italian all-news television channel, related to the Italian newspaper la Repubblica and owned by Gruppo Editoriale L'Espresso.

It launched on April 10, 2006, during the Italian general election, broadcasting news, weather bulletins, and political programs from 10:00 a.m. to 12:00 a.m and repeating from 9:00 p.m. to 12:00 p.m, Monday to Friday. Its test transmission was in simulcast with All Music. It ceased broadcasting to all providers on May 11, 2013.

== See also ==
- la Repubblica
