= Ernesto Assante =

Italian music critic (1958–2024)

- Born: 12 February 1958; Naples, Italy
- Died: 26 February 2024 (aged 66); Rome, Italy
- Occupation: Music critic

Ernesto Assante (12 February 1958 – 26 February 2024) was an Italian music critic, essayist and journalist. He has been described as 'a prophet of contemporary journalism back in the 1990s'.

== Life and career ==
Born in Naples, Assante started his career as a collaborator of some Roman private radios and as a music journalist for the newspapers Quotidiano dei lavoratori and Il manifesto. Starting from 1978, he was a long-time collaborator of La Repubblica, for which he served as editor-in-chief, and also founded its official website repubblica.it and directed the Kataweb portal.

Later, he collaborated with numerous publications, notably Rolling Stone, L'Espresso and Rockol, wrote numerous books, and was also a radio and television writer and occasional presenter, a festival artistic director, and a lecturer at the Sapienza University of Rome.

Assante died from a stroke on 26 February 2024, at the age of 66.
