= Quotidiano di Sicilia =

- Front page, 17 February 2008
- Type: Daily newspaper
- Format: Berliner
- Owner(s): Ediservice S.r.l.
- Editor: Carlo Alberto Tregua
- Founded: 1979
- Political alignment: Independent
- Language: Italian
- Headquarters: Catania, Italy
- Circulation: 21,500 (2008)
- Website: www.qds.it

Quotidiano di Sicilia (lit. 'Daily of Sicily') is an Italian regional daily newspaper for the island of Sicily.

== History and profile ==
Quotidiano di Sicilia was founded in 1979 and is based in Catania. In 2008 the paper had a circulation of 21,500 copies.

== See also ==
- List of newspapers in Italy
