= Il Giorno (newspaper) =

Italian newspaper

- Front page (Milan edition), 8 February 2009
- Type: Daily newspaper
- Format: Broadsheet
- Owner: Poligrafici Editoriale (since 1997)
- Founder(s): • Cino Del Duca • Gaetano Baldacci
- Editor: Giuliano Molossi
- Founded: 21 March 1956
- Political alignment: Conservatism; Centrism
- Language: Italian
- Headquarters: Milan, Italy
- Circulation: 69,000 (2008)
- ISSN: 1124-2116
- OCLC number: 759765507
- Website: ilgiorno.it

Il Giorno is a daily newspaper based in the city of Milan, Italy. It has numerous local editions in Lombardy.

== History and profile ==
Il Giorno was founded by the Italian businessman Cino Del Duca on 21 March 1956, with the journalist Gaetano Baldacci, to challenge Corriere della Sera, also a daily newspaper published in Milan. Later, because of a financial crisis, Italian public administrator Enrico Mattei and the state-owned oil company Eni bought part of the publishing company. The paper maintains a liberal political stance.

In 1959, Del Duca sold his stake to Eni and Italo Pietra became the newspaper's editor. One of the former contributors of the paper was Adolfo Battaglia.

In 1997, Eni sold Il Giorno to the Italian publishing company Poligrafici Editoriale, which also owns two other Italian newspapers (il Resto del Carlino and La Nazione) under the Quotidiano Nazionale network.

In 2000, Il Giorno switched from a broadsheet to a tabloid format. The paper was published in tabloid format until 2003 when it adopted again broadsheet format. In 2009, the paper began to publish a new sports supplement.

== Circulation ==
The 1988 circulation of Il Giorno was 290,000 copies. In 1992 it had a circulation of 170,000 copies. Its circulation was 75,601 copies in 2004. In 2008 the newspaper had a circulation of approximately 69,000 copies.

== See also ==
- List of newspapers in Italy
