= Kataweb =

Italian web company

- Website type: Portal
- Owner: Gruppo Editoriale L'Espresso
- Creator: Elemedia
- Website: http://www.kataweb.it/
- Commercial: Yes
- Registration: 1999
- Current status: Active

KataWeb S.p.A. is an Italian company who offers internet publishing and related services.

Its services include a web portal and dial-up Internet access that was launched in 1999. Subsequently, it offered access to more disparate materials, organised into channels, and services such as e-mail (called Katamail, sold to Tiscali in 2015), VoIP and blog host.
