= Gazzetta di Mantova =

Italian newspaper established in 1664

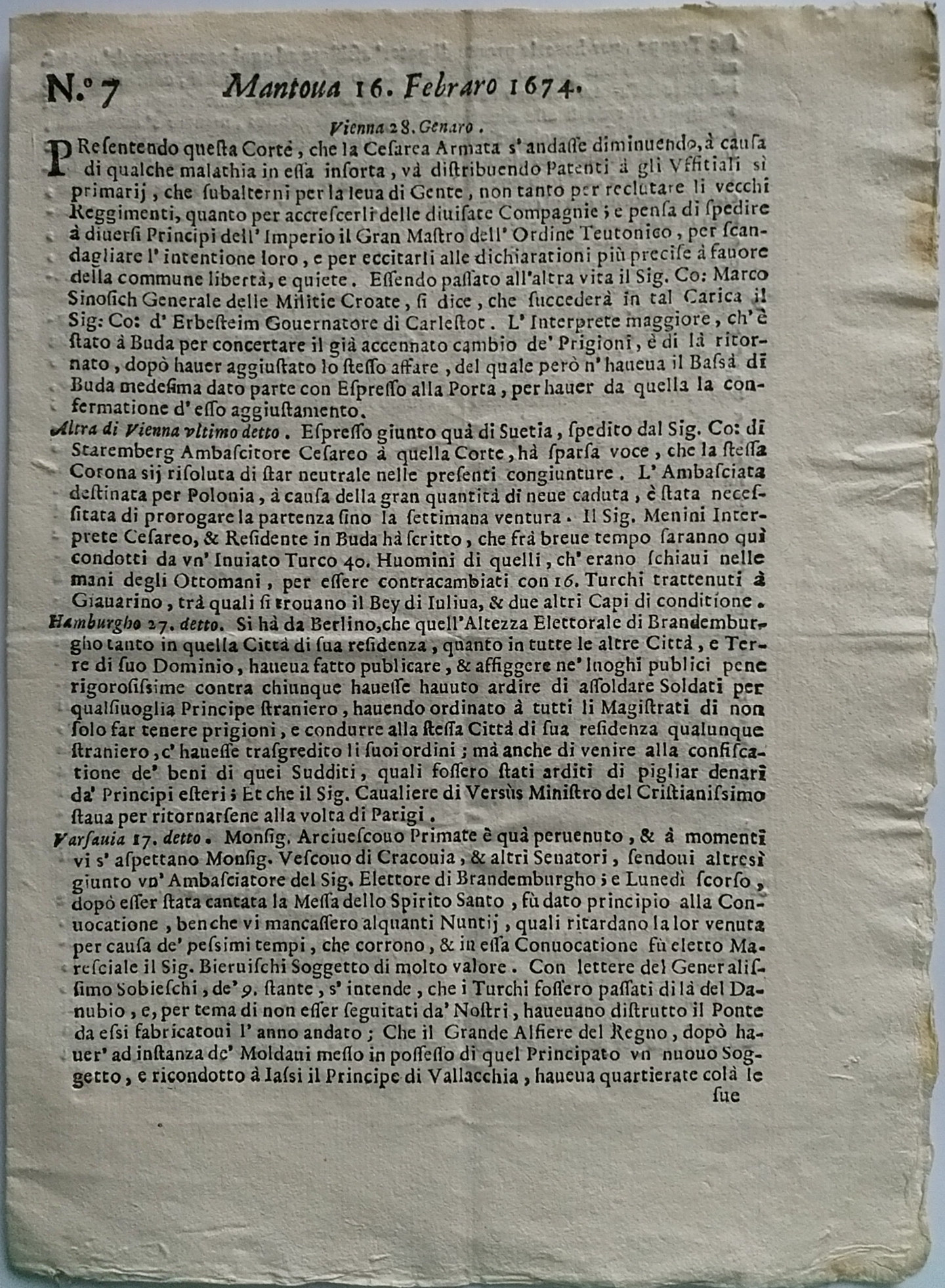
- Gazzetta di Mantova issue on the 16th of February, 1674
- Type: Daily newspaper
- Owner: Gruppo Editoriale Athesis S.p.A.
- Founded: 1664; 362 years ago
- Political alignment: Independent
- Language: Italian
- Headquarters: Mantua, Italy
- Circulation: 11.710 (2025)
- Website: gazzettadimantova.it

Gazzetta di Mantova (lit. 'Gazette of Mantua') is a daily newspaper based in the city of Mantua, Italy. It was established in 1664, making it the world's oldest newspaper still existing and published with the same name. The paper has its headquarters in Mantua.

== History and profile ==
From 1989 to 2023, the newspaper was owned by Gruppo Editoriale L'Espresso.

By 1st October 2023 the owner of the paper is Gruppo Editoriale Athesis. The paper has an independent political stance.

The circulation of Gazzetta di Mantova was 34,000 copies in 2007. In 2013 Gruppo Editoriale L'Espresso claimed a circulation of 25,437 copies for the paper. In December 2025, the daily circulation of the paper was 11.710 copies.

== See also ==
- List of newspapers in Italy
