= Libertà (newspaper) =

Italian newspaper

Libertà (lit. 'Liberty') is an Italian newspaper published in Piacenza, Italy.

The newspaper, which was founded by Ernesto Prati and first published in 1883, is one of the country's oldest still in circulation. As of 2020, its editor is Pietro Visconti.
