= Il Giornale di Vicenza =

Il Giornale di Vicenza logo

Il Giornale di Vicenza (lit. 'The Newspaper of Vicenza') is an Italian newspaper published in Vicenza, Italy.

The newspaper, which was first published in 1915 as La Provincia di Vicenza and has since been the leading one in Vicenza and its province, is controlled by Athesis SpA (which notably controls also L'Arena, Verona's main newspaper) and, as of 2020, is edited by Luca Ancetti.
