= Avvenire =

Italian daily newspaper

- Front page, 31 December 2008
- Type: Daily newspaper
- Format: Broadsheet
- Owner: Italian Episcopal Conference
- Editor: Marco Girardo
- Founded: 1968; 58 years ago
- Political alignment: Political Catholicism; Catholic social teaching Christian left
- Language: Italian
- Headquarters: Milan, Italy
- Circulation: 45,160,996: annually (2012)
- Website: Avvenire

Avvenire (English: "Future") is a daily newspaper which is affiliated with the Catholic Church and is based in Milan, Italy.

== History and profile ==
Avvenire was founded in 1968 in Milan through the merger of two Catholic newspapers: L'Avvenire d'Italia of Bologna and l'Italia of Milan. The paper has its headquarters in Milan and is the organ of the progressive wing of the Vatican Council. Pope Paul VI strongly supported the daily and wanted a common cultural medium for Italian Catholics. Throughout its history, Avvenire has maintained this characteristic, despite pressures to accommodate itself to the needs of a society in evolution. For example, in the middle of the 1990s, under the editorship of Dino Boffo, it increased its coverage of civil society and extended the parts of the newspaper devoted to cultural debate.

New initiatives were also launched. In February 1996, a biweekly insert under the name of "Popotus" was published devoted exclusively to youth, for whom three other inserts were also included: "Luoghi dell'Infinito", "Noi Genitori e Figli", and "Non Profit". In 1998, an Internet edition began to be published.

On 7 March 2002, Avvenire experienced a major change with the format and content. From that time, a number of new inserts have been included: "L'Economia Civile" (about job and employment) and "Gutenberg" (about culture).

These innovations have led to a steady increase in its circulation, significant given the general decline in sales of other Italian newspapers. The average number of copies sold each day in February 2005 was 103,000. As of 2024, Marco Girardo was the editor of the newspaper.

The newspaper belongs to the Italian Episcopal Conference.

== Circulation ==
In 1997 the circulation of Avvenire was 94,700 copies. It was 97,934 copies in 2004. In 2008 the paper had a circulation of 105,812 copies. The circulation of the paper was 106,306 copies in 2009 and 106,928 copies in 2010.

In 2012 Avvenire sold 45,160,996 copies.

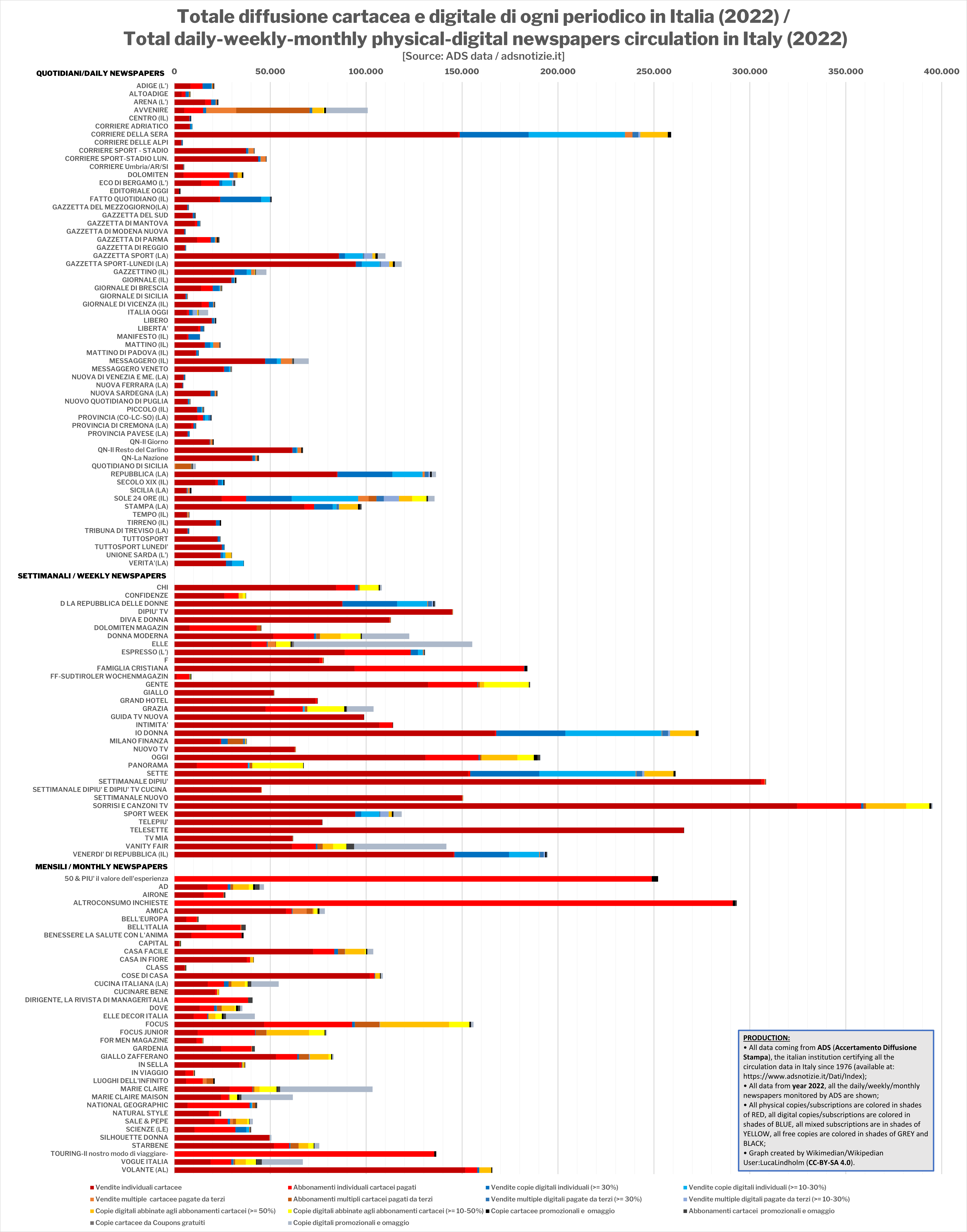
Average daily circulation of Avvenire (1976–2022, ADS data). The radically different industrial plan compared to other dailies—consisting mainly in the sale of lots to religious institutions and similar—have ensured the newspaper a stable and constant circulation over time.

== See also ==
- List of newspapers in Italy
