= Gazzetta di Parma =

Italian daily newspaper

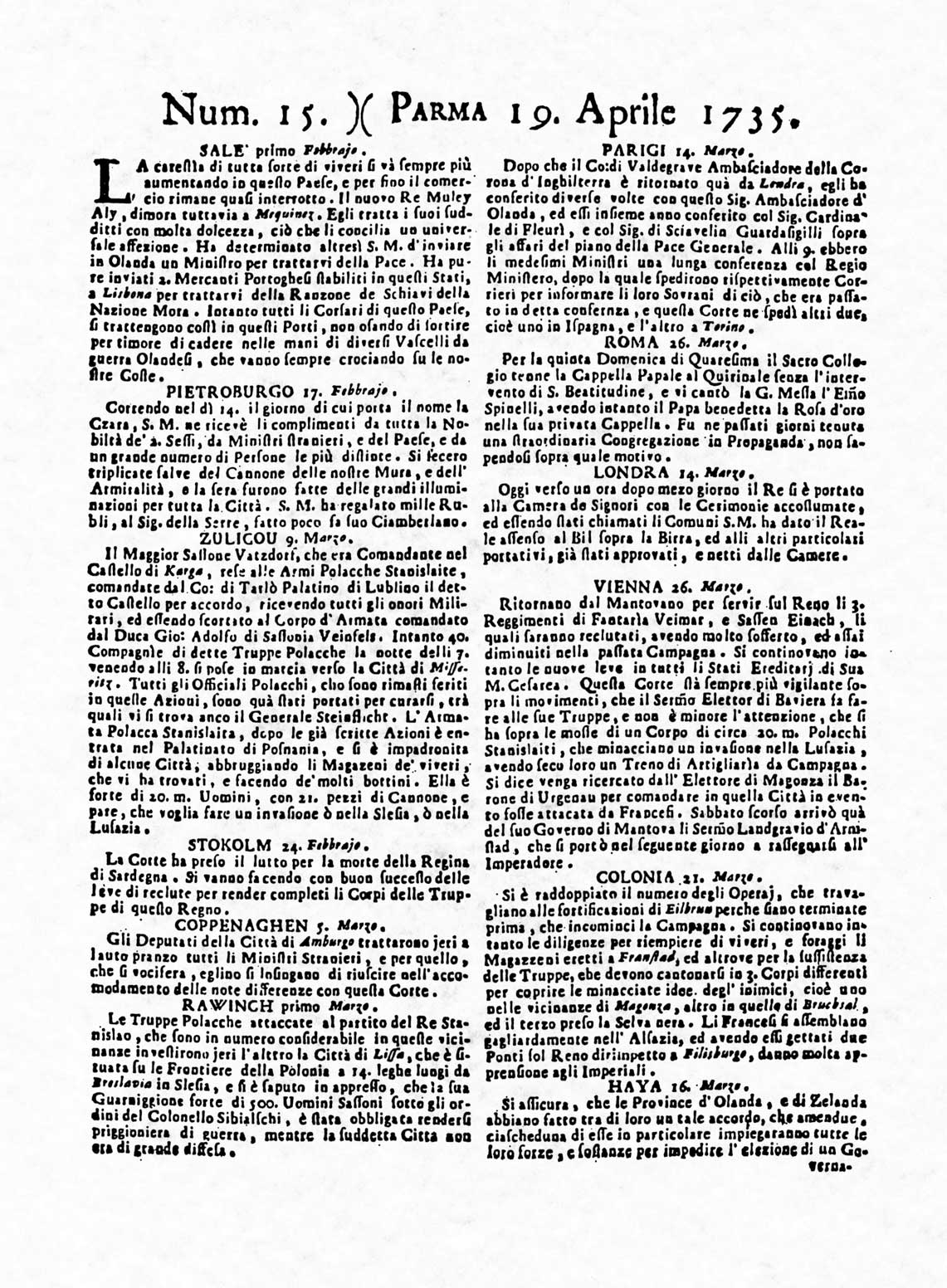
- Cover page of the oldest issue existing
- Type: Daily newspaper
- Founded: 1728; 298 years ago
- Language: Italian
- Headquarters: Parma
- Country: Italy
- Website: Gazzetta di Parma

Gazzetta di Parma (lit. 'Gazette of Parma') is a daily newspaper published in Parma, Italy. It is one of the oldest daily newspapers in the country.

== History and profile ==
Gazzetta di Parma, founded in 1728, was established as a weekly newspaper in 1735. Cesare Zavattini started his career in the paper. Early contributors included Giovannino Guareschi, Giuseppe Verdi, Arturo Toscanini, Alberto Bevilacqua, Luca Goldoni and Leonardo Sciascia. The daily focuses on local news related to Parma.

The circulation of Gazzetta di Parma was 43,000 copies in 2007.

== See also ==
- List of newspapers in Italy
