= La Tribuna di Treviso =

Italian daily newspaper

- Type: Daily newspaper
- Owner(s): Gruppo Editoriale L'Espresso
- Publisher: Finegil Editoriale (part of Gruppo Editoriale L'Espresso)
- Founded: 1978; 47 years ago
- Political alignment: Independent
- Language: Italian
- Headquarters: Treviso
- Country: Italy
- Website: tribunatreviso.gelocal.it/treviso

La Tribuna di Treviso is an Italian language regional daily newspaper published in Treviso, Italy. It has been in circulation since 1978.

== History and profile ==
La Tribuna di Treviso was started in 1978. The paper is based in Treviso. Gruppo Editoriale L'Espresso is the owner of the paper, which is published by Finegil Editoriale S.p.A. It has an independent political stance. Its sister newspapers are Il Mattino di Padova, La Nuova Venezia and Il Corriere delle Alpi. The Padovan newspaper Il Mattino di Padova provides the national and regional content for La Tribuna di Treviso.

In 2014, Gruppo Espresso, the owner of La Tribuna di Treviso, claimed a circulation of 13,400 copies for the paper.
