= La Provincia di Cremona =

Regional daily newspaper in Italy

La Provincia di Cremona (transl. "The Province of Cremona") is a regional daily Italian newspaper based in Cremona. The paper was established in 1947. Its publisher is Soc. Editoriale Cremonese S.P.A. One of its former editors is Antonio Grassi.
