= Bresciaoggi =

Newspaper

- Type: Daily newspaper
- Publisher: Edizioni Brescia (a subsidiary of Società Athesis)
- Language: Italian
- City: Brescia
- Country: Italy
- Website: bresciaoggi.it

Bresciaoggi (lit. 'Brescia-Today') is a morning daily newspaper that serves Brescia, in the Lombardy metropolitan area of Italy. It was founded in 1974.
