= La Nuova Sardegna =

Italian newspaper

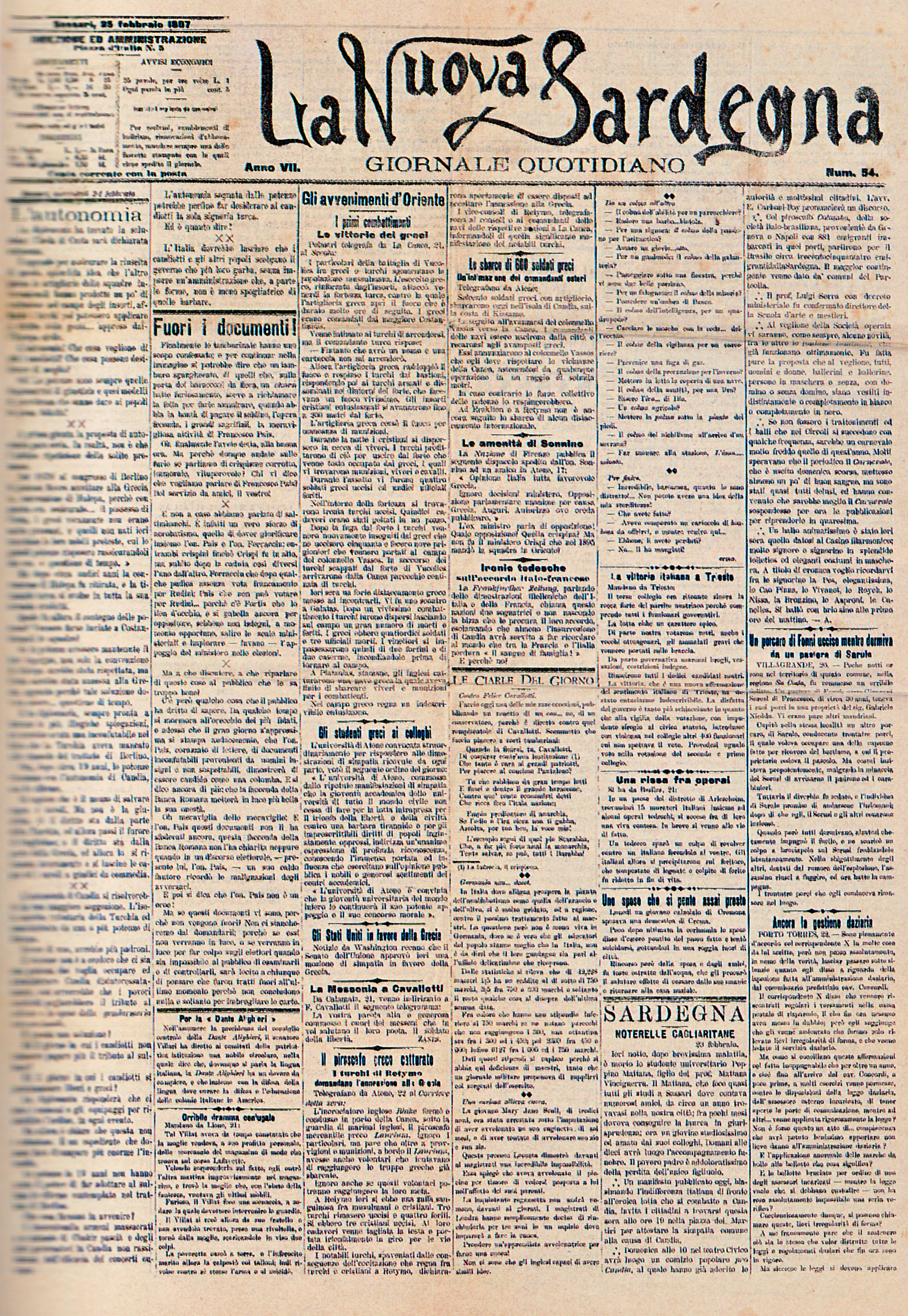
- An edition from the late 19th century
- Type: Daily newspaper
- Format: Tabloid
- Owner(s): Gruppo Editoriale L'Espresso
- Founded: 1891; 134 years ago
- Political alignment: Centrism; Social liberalism
- Language: Italian
- Headquarters: Sassari, Italy
- Circulation: 42,300 (2014)
- Website: La Nuova Sardegna

La Nuova Sardegna (lit. 'The New Sardinia') is an Italian regional daily newspaper for the island of Sardinia.

== History and profile ==
La Nuova Sardegna was founded in 1891 by Enrico Berlinguer, grandfather and namesake of Enrico Berlinguer, national secretary of the Italian Communist Party. The paper has its headquarters in Sassari. La Nuova Sardegna was acquired by Gruppo Editoriale L'Espresso in 1980.

The 2008 circulation of La Nuova Sardegna was 59,819 copies. The Espresso Group reported that the circulation of the paper was 42,300 copies in 2014.
