= Giornale di Brescia =

Regional newspaper in Italy

- Editor-in-chief: Nunzia Vallini
- Founded: 27 April 1945
- Language: Italian
- Headquarters: Brescia
- Country: Italy

Giornale di Brescia (lit. 'Newspaper of Brescia') is a regional newspaper based in Brescia, Italy. The paper has been in circulation since 1945.

== History and profile ==
Giornale di Brescia was founded in 1945. The first issue appeared on 27 April 1945. The paper was official organ of the National Liberation Committee. Its headquarters is in Brescia. The paper was redesigned on 27 April 2015, its 70th anniversary.

In late September 2015 Nunzia Vallini was named as the director of the paper. She replaced Giacomo Scanzi in the post.

Giornale di Brescia published 141 stories written by Enrico Morovich between 1949 and 1978. The paper started a supplement entitled Summer Garda in 2015 to promote the tourism in Lake Garda. It was a magazine published in the spring and summer months. Giornale di Brescia temporarily closed its official Facebook page in November 2020 due to racist and negative comments on the COVID-19-related deaths in Italy. After making changes in its social media policy it restarted to post on Facebook from 26 April 2022.

In 2012 Giornale di Brescia sold 18,419,601 copies.
