= Alto Adige (newspaper) =

Italian newspaper

- Type: Daily newspaper
- Format: Berliner
- Owner(s): Società Editrice Tipografica Atesina (Athesia Group)
- Founded: 1945; 81 years ago
- Language: Italian
- Headquarters: Bolzano
- Circulation: 6,968 (2026)
- Website: altoadige.it

Alto Adige is an Italian local daily newspaper, based in Bolzano. It is sold in South Tyrol and since 1999 also in the province of Belluno. Prior to 2000, the newspaper was published with three local editions, for South Tyrol, Trentino and Belluno, when was subdivided with two new local newspapers: Trentino and Corriere delle Alpi. Since 2016, the newspaper has been part of the Athesia Group which, besides several radio stations, controls the daily newspaper Dolomiten.

== History and profile ==
Alto Adige was founded in 1945 by the National Liberation Committee after the previous closure of the newspaper La Provincia di Bolzano in the same year, becoming the only Italian language newspaper in South Tyrol. Becoming a regional-circulation newspaper in 1946, in the 1950s decade the publisher, S.E.T.A., received financial aids from the Italian Government to defend the Italianization of South Tyrol and maintain the Brenner border with Austria.

Between 1958 and 1999 Alto Adige had two German language pages called Deutsches Blatt. For the Ladin (and occasionally also for the Romansh or Friulian) language minorities is published a weekly special page called Plata ladins. Another bi-weekly special page is published in alternating for the Cimbrian/Mócheno language minorities, called Di sait vo Lusèrn and Liaba lait.

In 2016 Gruppo Editoriale L’Espresso sold the paper to the Athesia Group, which controls the daily newspaper Dolomiten, L'Adige, Trentino and several radio stations.

Alto Adige had a circulation of 36,446 copies in 2008. Gruppo Editoriale L’Espresso claimed a circulation of 12,220 copies for the paper in 2013. The company reported that the paper had a circulation of 11,400 in 2014. According to the Italian Federation of Newspaper Publishers (FIEG), in February 2026, the paid circulation was 6,968 copies per day.

== See also ==
- VB33, a regional television channel
