= Il Mattino di Padova =

Italian newspaper

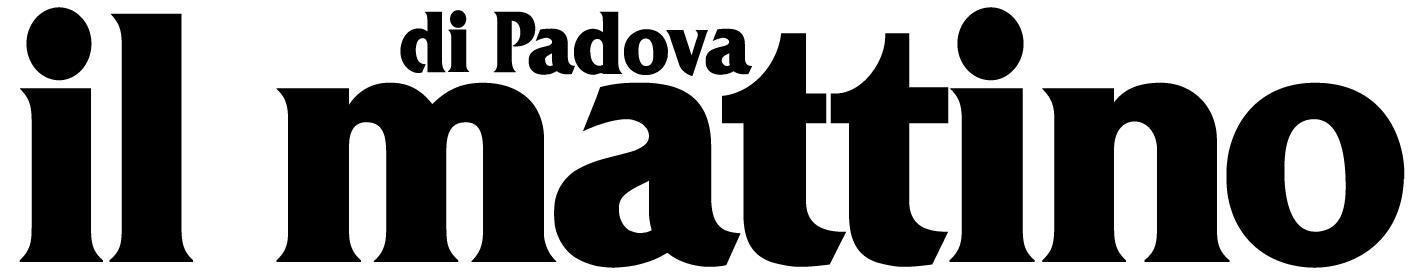
Il Mattino di Padova logo

Il Mattino di Padova (lit. 'The Morning of Padua') is an Italian newspaper published in Padua, Italy.

The newspaper, which was first published in 1978, was part of GEDI Gruppo Editoriale and specifically GEDI News Network, controlling La Repubblica, La Stampa, Il Secolo XIX and several local newspapers. In Veneto, other than Il Mattino di Padova, GEDI publisheD La Nuova Venezia, La Tribuna di Treviso and Corriere delle Alpi.

As of 2024, the newspaper Was edited by Paolo Possamai.
