= La Gazzetta del Mezzogiorno =

Regional newspaper in Italy

- Front page, 4 July 2009
- Type: Daily newspaper
- Format: Tabloid
- Owner: Mario Ciancio Sanfilippo
- Publisher: Edisud
- Editor-in-chief: Oscar Iarussi (2021)
- Founded: 1 November 1887; 138 years ago
- Language: Italian
- Headquarters: Bari, Italy
- Circulation: 110,000 (2016)
- Website: www.lagazzettadelmezzogiorno.it

La Gazzetta del Mezzogiorno (English: "The Midday Gazette") is an Italian daily newspaper, founded in 1887 in Bari, Italy. It is one of the leading newspapers published in Southern Italy, with most of its readers living in Apulia and Basilicata.

La Gazzetta del Mezzogiorno suspended its publication temporarily on 1 August 2021 due to financial crisis and court proceedings against its ex owner, Mario Ciancio Sanfilippo. The newspaper resumed publications on 19 February 2022.

== History and profile ==
La Gazzetta del Mezzogiorno was first published on 1 November 1887 in Bari, Italy, by the magazine editor Martino Cassano to fill the niche for a local newspaper in Bari and in Puglia; Originally published as the Corriere delle Puglie, its current title began to be used by editor Raphael Gorjux on 26 February 1928.

The editor-in-chief of La Gazzetta del Mezzogiorno was Giuseppe de Tomaso until 2021. On 11 November 2021, Oscar Iarussi was appointed the editor-in-chief of La Gazzetta del Mezzogiorno.

The 2008 circulation of La Gazzetta del Mezzogiorno was 88,275 copies. It was 110,000 copies in 2016.

After its suspension, the bankruptcy receivers for La Gazzetta del Mezzogiorno filed an appeal against the former manager of the newspaper, Ledi srl for the trademark La Nuova Gazzetta di Puglia e Basilicata, which is to be used in an upcoming newspaper of the company, citing potential confusion with the name La Gazzetta del Mezzogiorno.

Finally, the newspaper resumed publications on 19 February 2022.

== Local editions ==
Seven different local editions are published, assuming different names in accordance with the locale:

- La Gazzetta di Bari, for the province of Bari;
- La Gazzetta di Brindisi, for the province of Brindisi;
- La Gazzetta di Capitanata, for the province of Foggia;
- La Gazzetta di Lecce, for the province of Lecce;
- La Gazzetta di Matera, for the province of Matera;
- La Gazzetta del Nord Barese, for the province of Barletta-Andria-Trani and the municipality of Corato;
- La Gazzetta di Potenza, for the province of Potenza;
- La Gazzetta di Taranto, for the province of Taranto.

There are separate editorial offices in Bari, Foggia, Lecce, Matera, Barletta, Potenza, Taranto.

== See also ==
- List of newspapers in Italy
