= Il Centro =

Italian newspaper

il Centro
- Quotidiano dell'Abruzzo ("Daily of Abruzzo")
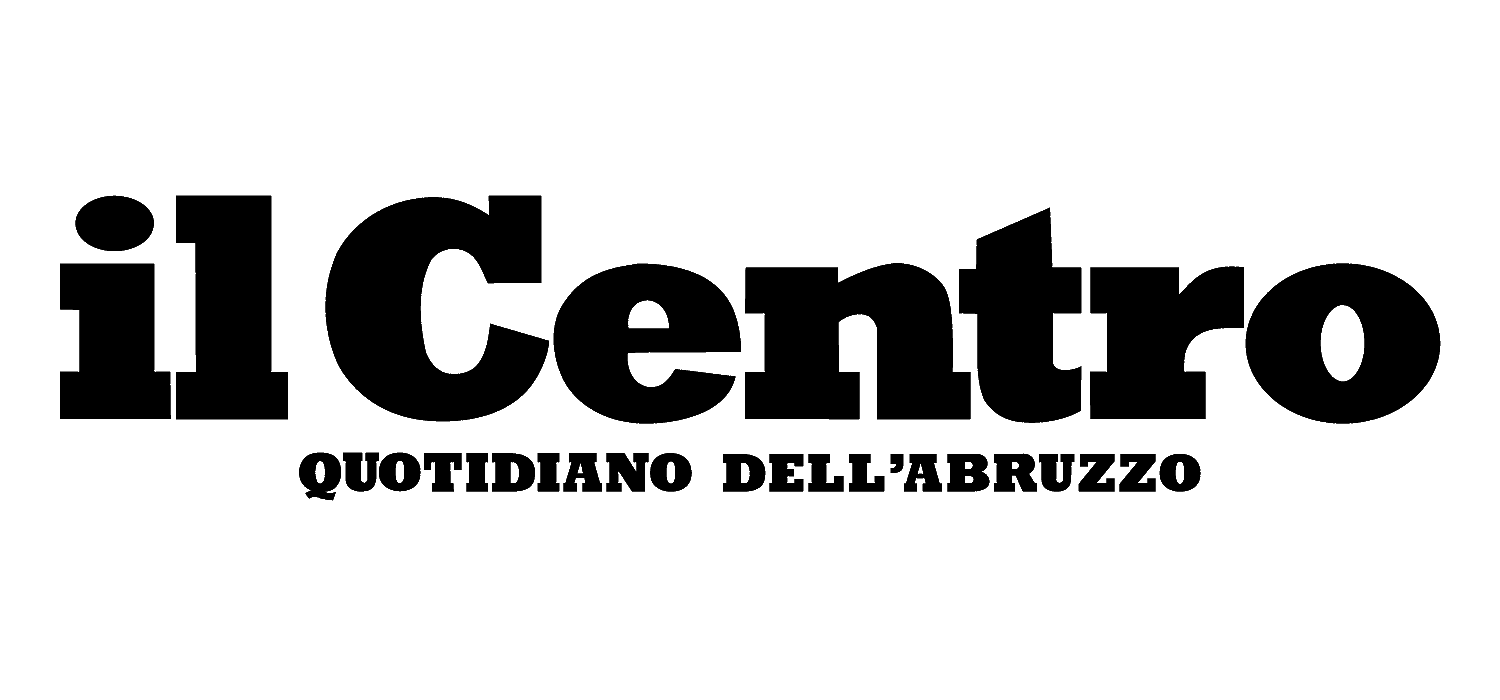
- Type: Daily newspaper
- Owner: Luigi Pierangeli
- Publisher: Il Centro S.p.A.
- Founded: 1986; 40 years ago
- Political alignment: Independent
- Language: Italian
- Headquarters: Pescara, Italy
- Circulation: 17,500 (2014)
- Website: www.ilcentro.it

il Centro (lit. 'The Center') is an Italian language local daily newspaper based in Pescara, Italy.

== History ==
il Centro was founded in 1986 and the first issue was published on 3 July. Its headquarters is in Pescara and the paper was published by Finegil Editoriale.

The newspaper was part of Gruppo Editoriale L'Espresso until 2016, when it was sold to local businessman Luigi Pierangeli.

il Centro has an independent political stance.

The editorial office of the paper in L'Aquila was severely damaged during the earthquake in 2009.

il Centro had a circulation of 24,265 copies in 2008. Gruppo Editoriale L'Espresso claimed a circulation of 19,041 copies for the paper in 2013. The company reported that the circulation of the paper was 17,500 copies in 2014.

== Localised publications ==
- Chieti-Lanciano-Vasto
- L'Aquila-Avezzano-Sulmona
- Pescara
- Teramo
