= Gazzetta di Modena =

Gazzetta di Modena is a morning daily newspaper that serves the city of Modena and its similarly named province in Italy.

== History and profile ==
Gazzetta di Modena was established in 1981. It is part of the Gruppo Editoriale L'Espresso media conglomerate. The paper is based in Modena and is published by Finegal Editoriale S.P.A. Gazzetta di Modena has an independent political stance.

== See also ==
- List of newspapers in Italy
