= Il Piccolo =

Italian newspaper

- Front page (Trieste edition), 11 October 2008
- Type: Daily newspaper
- Format: Broadsheet
- Owner: Gruppo Editoriale L'Espresso
- Editor: Paolo Possamai
- Founded: 1881; 145 years ago
- Political alignment: Progressivism
- Language: Italian
- Headquarters: Trieste, Italy
- Circulation: 28,800 (2014)
- Website: ilpiccolo.gelocal.it

Il Piccolo is the main daily newspaper of Trieste, Italy. Its name derives from the paper's original small format.

== History and profile ==
Il Piccolo was founded by Teodoro Mayer in 1881. He was also the owner and editor-in-chief of the paper. Mayer and other people who were instrumental in the establishment of the paper were right-wing pro-Italians. Mayer supported the idea that Trieste was part of Italy. One of its contributors was Carolina Luzzatto who was a supporter of this view.

Il Piccolo ceased publication at the beginning of World War I and was relaunched in 1919. Following the beginning of the Fascist rule in Italy the paper declared its adherence to the Fascist ideology in 1923. Until the end of World War II the paper was edited by those with fascist political leaning.

Il Piccolo is based in Trieste and it is published by Finegil Editoriale SPA which has been a subsidiary of Gruppo Espresso since 1998. Local editions for the towns of Monfalcone and Gorizia and for the region of Istria (Croatia) are also printed. It has a progressive political stance.

== Circulation ==
The circulation of Il Piccolo was 40,231 copies in 2008. The paper had a circulation of 31,302 copies in 2013. The Espresso Group reported that the circulation of the paper was 28,800 copies in 2014.
