= L'Adige (newspaper) =

l'Adige
- Type: Daily newspaper
- Format: Tabloid
- Owner: Società Iniziative Editoriali
- Founded: 1945
- Language: Italian
- Headquarters: Trento
- Circulation: 26,515 (2008)
- Website: ladige.it

l'Adige is an Italian local daily newspaper, based in Trento. It is sold in Trentino and is the most read newspaper in the region, along with its main rivals Corriere del Trentino and Trentino.

== History and profile ==
l'Adige was founded in 1945 as the weekly Il Popolo Trentino. In started to be published in 1946 as a daily under the direction of Flaminio Piccoli, editor in chief from 1946 until 1977.

Until 1981, the newspaper politically supported the Christian Democracy, which was also one of the stakeholders of the publisher.

The circulation of l'Adige was 26,515 copies in 2008.
