= La Provincia (newspaper) =

Italian daily newspaper

- Type: Daily newspaper
- Format: Berliner
- Founder: Luigi Massuero
- Publisher: Sesaab
- Founded: 1892; 134 years ago
- Language: Italian
- Headquarters: Como, Italy
- ISSN: 1590-5888 (print); 2499-4243 (web)
- Website: laprovincia.it

La Provincia (Italian pronunciation: [la proˈvintʃa]; lit. 'The Province') is an Italian daily newspaper based in Como. It serves the northern Lombard provinces of Como, Lecco, and Sondrio.

== History ==
The newspaper was founded by Luigi Massuero. Originally titled La Provincia di Como, its first issue was published on 26 March 1892, and Massuero acted as its director until 1914. It is published by Sesaab in three editions: La Provincia di Como, La Provincia di Lecco, and La Provincia di Sondrio.

In 2011, the entire archive of the newspaper, dating back to 1892, was made available online.

== Notable people ==
- Aristide Bari
- Michele Brambilla
- Massimo Caspani
- Paolo De Santis
- Gianni De Simoni
- Giorgio Gandola
- Luigi Massuero
- Diego Minonzio
- Alessandro Sallusti
- Dante Severin
- Alfonso Signorini
- Amedeo Vergani
