= Gazzetta di Reggio =

Italian daily newspaper

- Type: Daily newspaper
- Owner(s): Espresso Group
- Publisher: Finegil Editoriale S.P.A
- Founded: 1860; 165 years ago
- Political alignment: Independent
- Language: Italian
- Headquarters: Reggio Emilia
- Country: Italy
- Website: Gazzetta di Reggio

Gazzetta di Reggio (lit. 'Gazette of Reggio') is an Italian language daily newspaper published in Reggio Emilia, Italy. It has been in circulation since 1860.

== History and profile ==
Gazzetta di Reggio was founded in 1860. The paper serves for the Emilia-Romagna region and is based in Reggio Emilia. It is part of the Espresso Group which also owns La Repubblica and various regional newspapers. The publisher is Finegil Editoriale S.P.A. The paper has an independent political stance.

The circulation of Gazzetta di Reggio was 14,000 copies in 2007. In 2013 the paper sold 10,841 copies. The Espresso Group reported that the circulation of the paper was 10,500 copies in 2014.
