= La Provincia Pavese =

Italian daily newspaper

- Type: Daily newspaper
- Format: Berliner
- Owner: Gruppo Editoriale L'Espresso
- Publisher: Finegil
- Editor: Pierangela Fiorani
- Associate editor: Roberto Peraro
- Founded: 1870
- Language: Italian
- Headquarters: Pavia
- Circulation: 15,700 (2014)
- Website: La Provincia Pavese

La Provincia Pavese (lit. 'The Province of Pavia') is an Italian language regional daily newspaper and is the main paper of the province of Pavia.

== History and profile ==
La Provincia Pavese is part of the Gruppo Editoriale L'Espresso through its subsidiary, Finegil, which publishes it. The paper has its headquarters in Pavia.

In 2013 La Provincia Pavese had a circulation of 16,585 copies. The Espresso Group reported that the circulation of the paper was 15,700 copies in 2014.
