= Trentino (newspaper) =

Italian newspaper

Trentino is an Italian newspaper published in Trento, Italy.

The newspaper, which was first published in 1945, is Trentino's counterpart of Alto Adige, published in Bolzano. As of 2020, its editor is Pierluigi Depentori.
