= L'Eco di Bergamo =

Italian daily newspaper

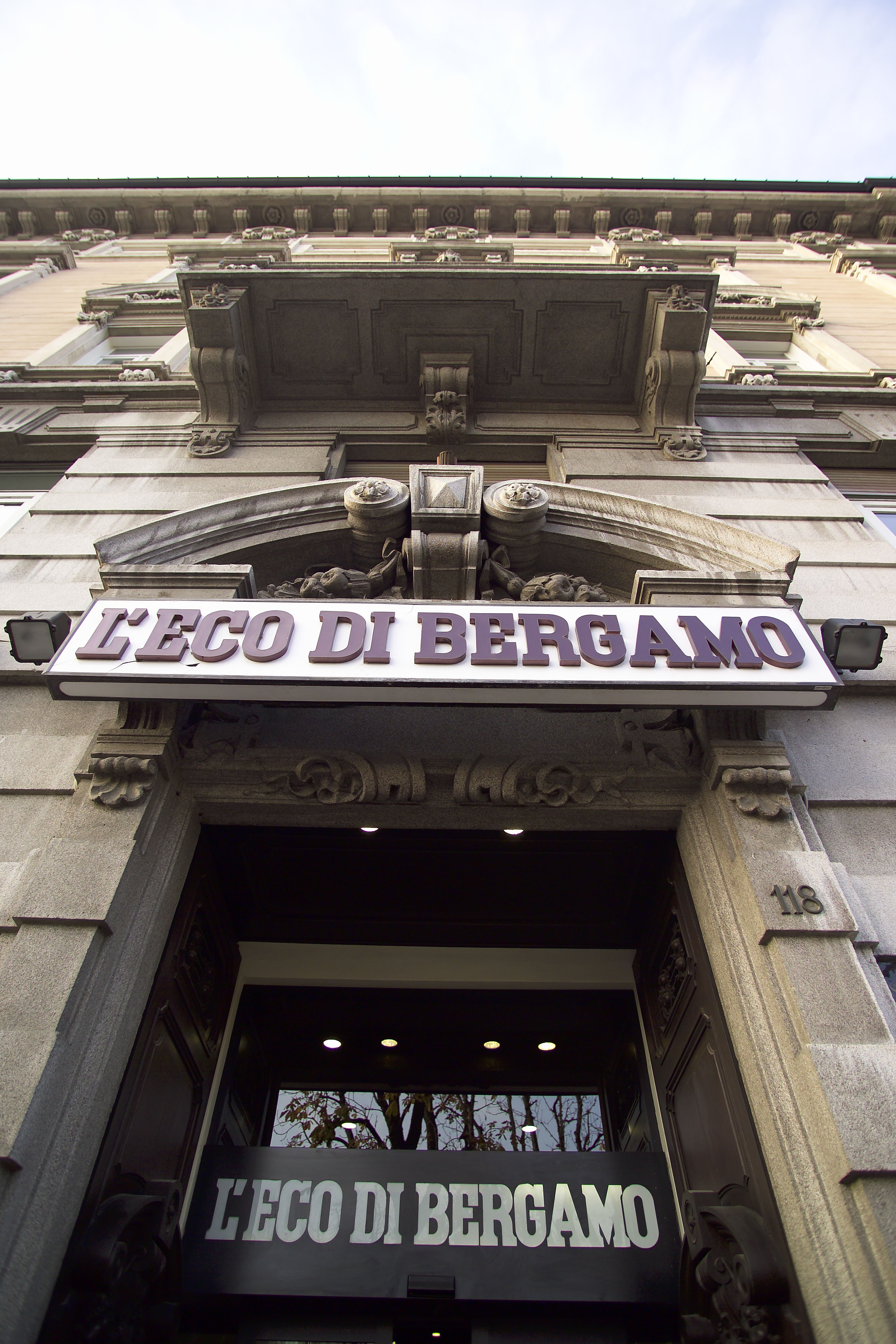
- Type: Daily newspaper
- Format: Berliner
- Owner(s): Bergamo Dioceses
- Founder(s): Sesa Company
- Publisher: SESAAB
- Founded: 1880; 145 years ago
- Political alignment: Catholic faith
- Language: Italian
- Headquarters: Bergamo
- Country: Italy
- Website: L'Eco di Bergamo

L'Eco di Bergamo (lit. 'The Echo of Bergamo') is a daily newspaper published in Bergamo, Italy. The paper has been in circulation since 1880.

== History and profile ==
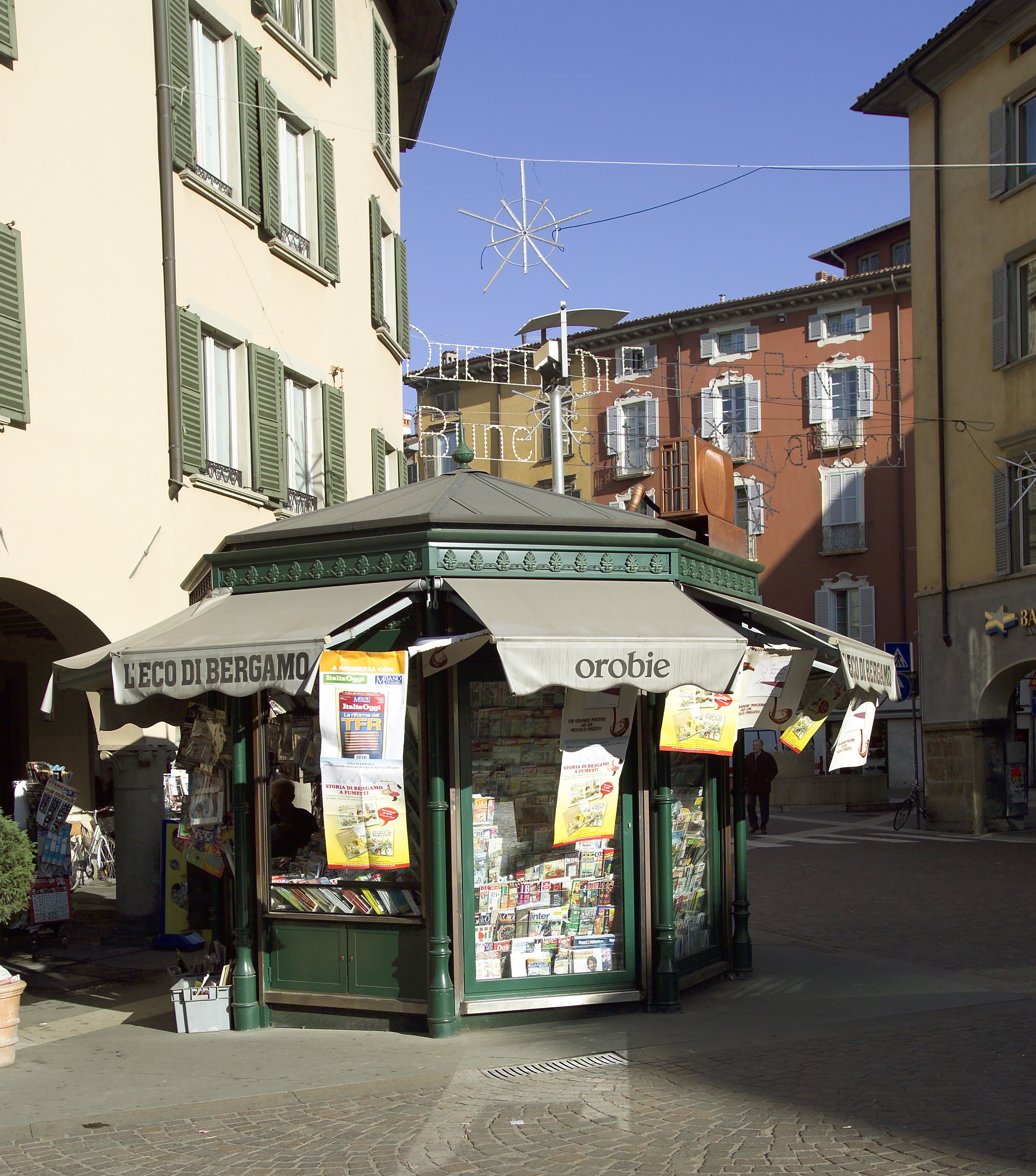
A newspaper stand in Lombardy for L'Eco di Bergamo and Orobie

L'Eco di Bergamo was established by the Sesa company in 1880. Its publisher is SESAAB, which is owned by the Bergamo Dioceses. SESAAB also publishes four editions of La Provincia newspaper, namely those of Como, Lecco, Sondrio and Varese.

The headquarters of L'Eco di Bergamo is in Bergamo, and the paper is published in the Berliner format. It is the first Italian newspaper which introduced color.

L'Eco di Bergamo has a Catholic-oriented leaning. An Italian priest Andrea Spada served as the editor-in-chief of the paper for 51 years. He was appointed to the post in 1938 and was in office until 1989.

At the end of the 1990s L'Eco di Bergamo sold 68,000 copies. Its circulation was 56,000 copies in 2007.
