= Il Resto del Carlino =

Italian newspaper

il Resto del Carlino

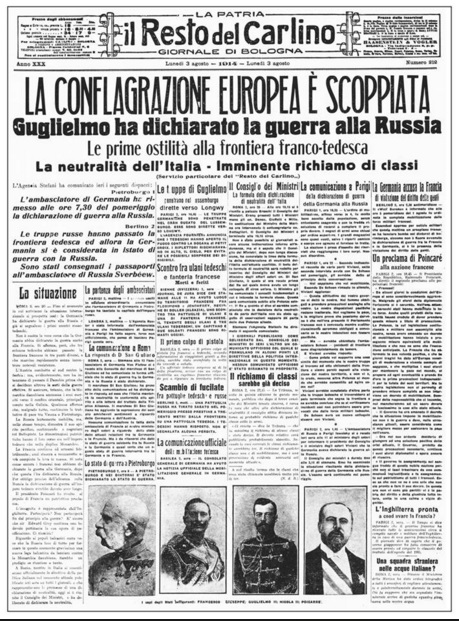
- Front page of il Resto del Carlino, 3 August 1914
- Type: Daily newspaper
- Format: Tabloid
- Owner: Monrif
- Publisher: Poligrafici Editoriale
- Editor: Andrea Cangini
- Founded: 21 March 1885; 141 years ago
- Political alignment: Conservatism; Centrism
- Language: Italian
- Headquarters: Bologna, Italy
- Circulation: 63,381 (2012)
- Sister newspapers: La Nazione; Il Giorno
- ISSN: 1128-6741
- Website: www.ilrestodelcarlino.it

il Resto del Carlino is a daily newspaper based in the city of Bologna, and is one of the oldest newspapers in Italy. Its rather evocative name means 'the change you get from a carlino', which the smallest part of the Papal baiocco (no longer legal tender in united Italy but a word still used in Bologna to refer to 10 cent coins): a sheet of local news was given out in shops to make up for the change owing after buying a cigar (which was worth 8 cents).

== History and profile ==
il Resto del Carlino was established in 1885. The founder was Amilcare Zamorani. Between 1912 and 1914 its editor was Giovanni Amendola. In 1988 the owner of the paper was Monrif. In 2004 the owners were Monrif (59.2%) and the RCS MediaGroup (9.9%). The publisher of the paper is Poligrafici Editoriali.

il Resto del Carlino is based in Bologna and is published in tabloid format. Its sister newspapers are La Nazione and Il Giorno.

== Circulation ==
The 1988 circulation of il Resto del Carlino was 310,000 copies. Its circulation was 188,000 copies in 2000. The circulation of the paper was 183,513 copies in 2001 and it was 180,098 copies in 2002. The paper had a circulation of 179,000 copies in 2003 and 176,277 copies in 2004. It was 168,000 copies in 2007 and 165,207 copies in 2008.

In 2012 the paper sold 63,381 copies.

== Local editions ==
- Ancona
- Ascoli
- Bologna
- Cesena
- Fermo
- Ferrara
- Forlì
- Imola
- Macerata
- Marche
- Modena
- Pesaro
- Ravenna
- Reggio Emilia
- Rimini
- Roma (as Quotidiano Nazionale)
- Romagna
- Rovigo

== See also ==
- List of newspapers in Italy
