= Il Tirreno =

Italian newspaper

- Front page (Livorno edition), 11 October 2008
- Type: Daily newspaper
- Format: Broadsheet
- Owner: Finegil Editoriale (Gruppo Editoriale L'Espresso)
- Editor: Cristiano Marcacci
- Founded: 1877; 148 years ago
- Political alignment: Social democracy Centre-left
- Language: Italian
- Headquarters: Livorno, Italy
- Circulation: 54,900 (2014)
- ISSN: 1592-9523 (print); 1593-2117 (web)
- Website: Il Tirreno

Il Tirreno (English: "The Tyrrhenian") is a regional Italian newspaper, printed in Livorno and serving the Tuscany region. Il Tirreno also features sixteen local editions around the whole region.

== History ==
It was founded in 1877 under the name Il Telegrafo, with a moderate centrist political line. During the fascist regime, it was owned by the Ciano family. Following the Liberation, it was replaced in 1945 by Il Tirreno, and switched to a left-wing policy. From 1957 to 1976 it was known again as Il Telegrafo, but then resumed using its current name. The paper is owned by the media company Gruppo Editoriale L'Espresso and has its headquarters in Livorno.

Between 1998 and 2001 Il Tirreno had a 21% share of the Italian language newspaper market in Tuscany. The circulation of the paper was 85,786 copies in 2004 and 80,832 copies in 2008. The Espresso Group reported that the paper had a circulation of 54,900 copies in 2014.

== See also ==
- Tyrrhenian Sea
