= L'Arena =

Italian local daily newspaper

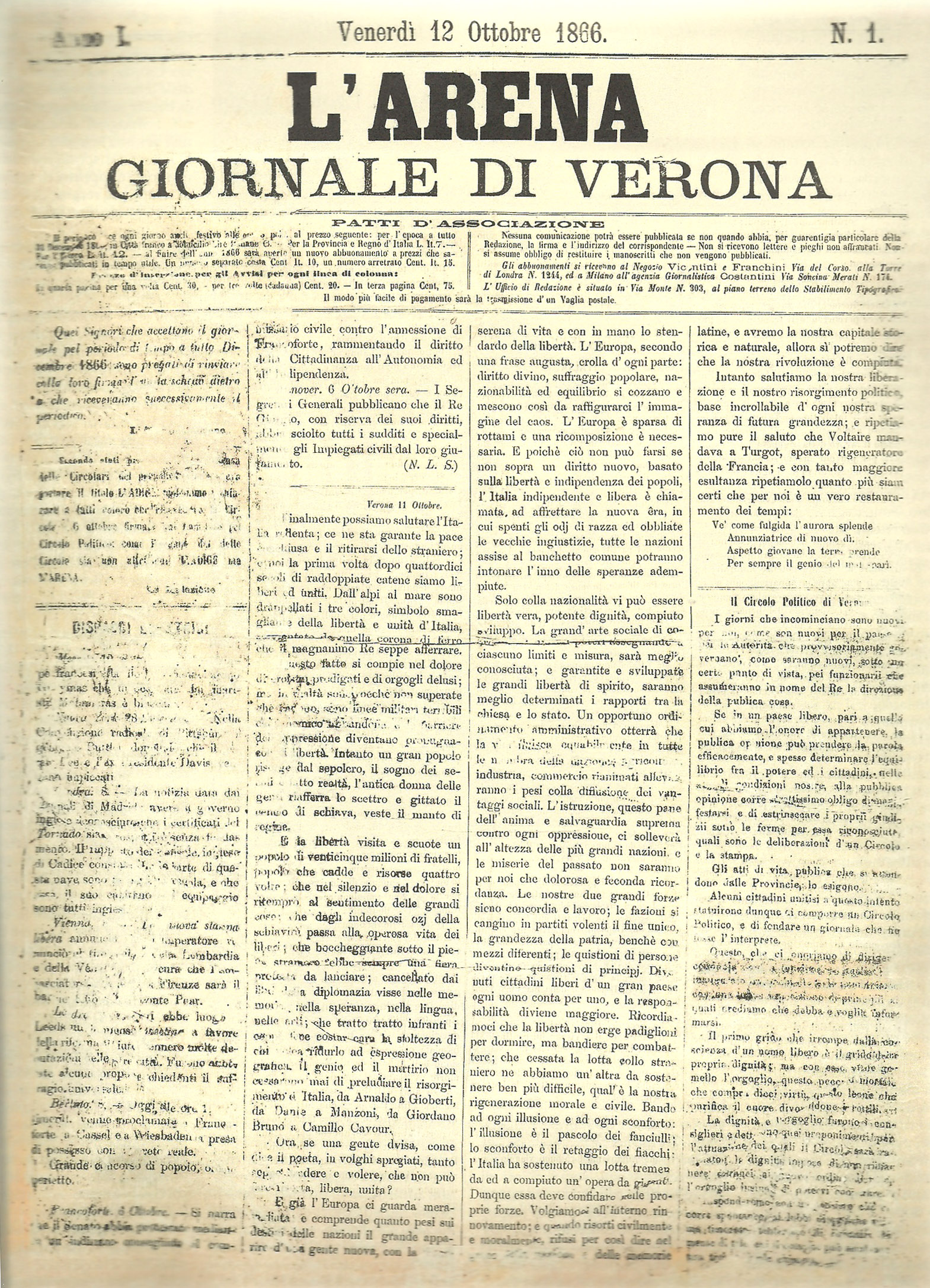
- Arena1866
- Type: Daily newspaper
- Owner(s): Società Athesis
- Founded: 1866
- Language: Italian
- Headquarters: Verona, Italy
- Website: www.larena.it

L'Arena is an Italian local daily newspaper, based in Verona, Italy.

== History and profile ==
Founded in 1866, shortly before the annexation of Veneto into the Kingdom of Italy, L'Arena is one of the oldest newspapers in Italy and the most popular newspaper in Verona. The owner and publisher of the daily is Società Athesis.

Carlo Terron, Italian drama critic and playwright, worked for the newspaper at the beginning of the 1940s.
