= Il Secolo XIX =

Italian newspaper founded in 1886

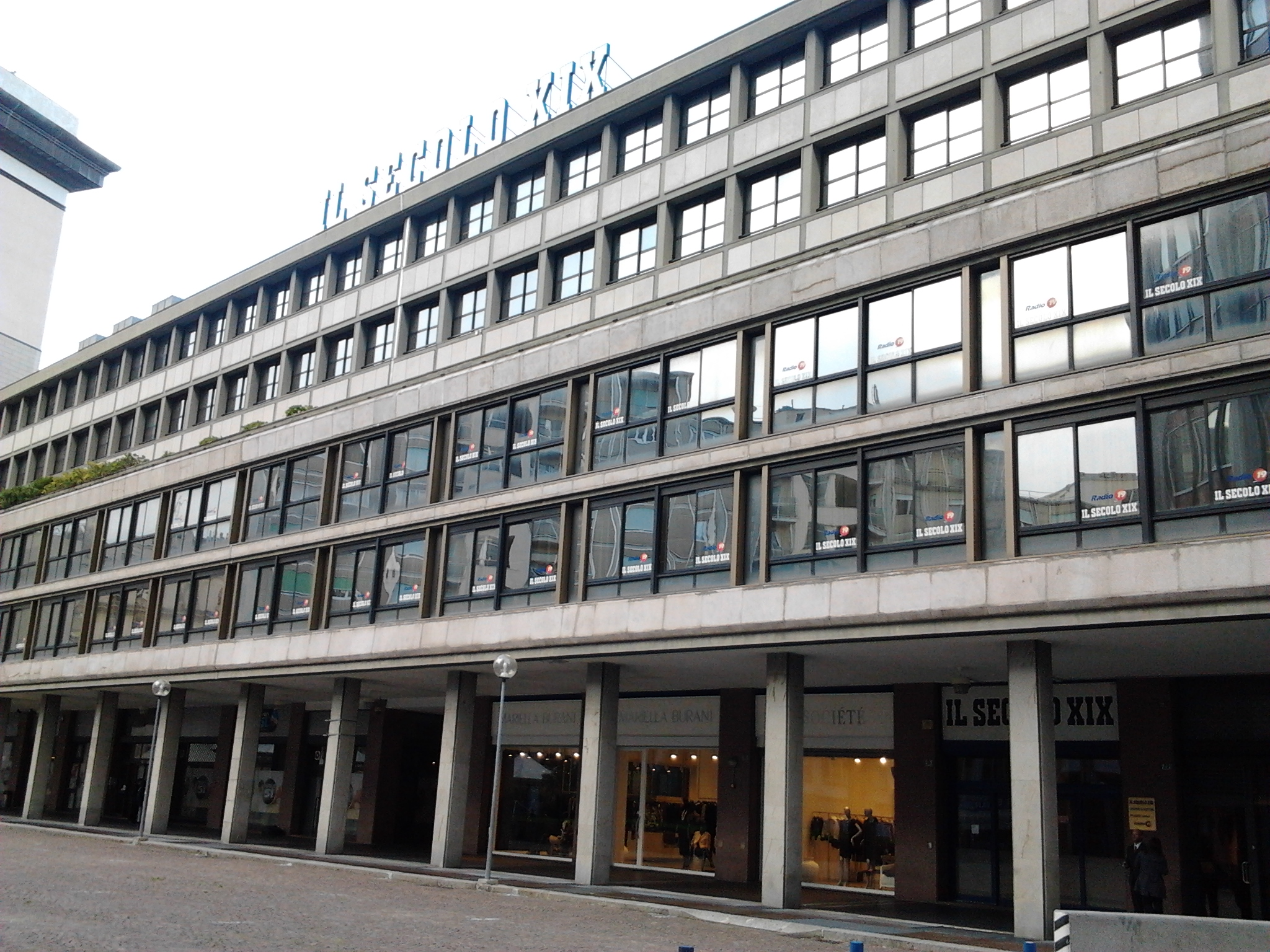
- Type: Daily newspaper
- Format: Broadsheet
- Owner: Blue Media Srl (MSC Group)
- Editor: Michele Brambilla
- Founded: 25 April 1886
- Political alignment: Independent
- Language: Italian
- Headquarters: Piazza Piccapietra 21, 16121, Genoa, Italy
- Circulation: 103,223 (as of 2008)
- ISSN: 1594-4395
- Website: Il Secolo XIX

Il Secolo XIX (Il Secolo Decimonono [il ˈsɛːkolo detʃimoˈnɔːno]) is an Italian newspaper published in Genoa, Italy, founded in March 1886, subsequently acquired by Ferdinando Maria Perrone in 1897 from Ansaldo. It is one of the first Italian newspapers to be printed in colour. On 16 January 2006, its 129th anniversary, the local radio "Radio 19" was launched (receivable also on the Metropolitana di Genova).

In 1997, Il Secolo XIX had a circulation of 127,825 copies. The 2008 circulation of the paper was 103,223 copies.

On 29 September 2024, the newspaper was acquired by Blue Media Srl, a company controlled by the MSC group.
