= La Nuova Venezia =

Italian daily newspaper

- Type: Daily newspaper
- Publisher: Gruppo Editoriale L'Espresso
- Founded: 1984; 41 years ago
- Language: Italian
- Headquarters: Venice
- Country: Italy
- Circulation: 6,805 (as of March 2021)
- Website: nuovavenezia.gelocal.it/venezia

La Nuova Venezia (full title:La Nuova di Venezia e Mestre, lit. 'The New of Venice and Mestre') is an Italian language regional daily newspaper published in Venice, Italy. It has been in circulation since 1984.

== History and profile ==
La Nuova Venezia was first published in 1984. The paper is part of the Gruppo Editoriale L'Espresso and is based in Venice. The daily mostly provides editorials and local news.

The circulation of La Nuova Venezia was 13,000 copies in 2007. The paper claimed a circulation of 15,419 copies in 2013. It was claimed to be 14,500 copies in 2014 and 7,376 copies in October 2020. The paper sold 6,465 copies and had a circulation of 6,805 copies in March 2021.
