= La Nazione =

Italian daily newspaper (founded 1859)

- Front page, 30 May 2009
- Type: Daily newspaper
- Format: Tabloid
- Owner(s): Monrif; RCS MediaGroup
- Publisher: Poligrafici Editoriale
- Editor: Pierfrancesco De Robertis
- Founded: 8 July 1859; 166 years ago
- Political alignment: Centrism; Conservatism
- Language: Italian
- Headquarters: Florence, Italy
- Circulation: 52,653 (2012)
- ISSN: 0391-6863
- Website: La Nazione

La Nazione (lit. 'The Nation') is one of the oldest regional newspapers in Italy, and was established on 8 July 1859. The paper is based in Florence.

== History and profile ==
La Nazione was founded by Bettino Ricasoli, interim head of the Tuscan government. The first issue appeared on 8 July 1859. Its title reflects the hope of Ricasoli for a unified Italy.

La Nazione merged with Cavour's famous political newspaper Il Risorgimento. Based in Florence, Italy, it is published in fourteen editions including those for the regions of Tuscany, Umbria and for the province of La Spezia, in Liguria. The early contributors include Edmondo De Amicis, Carlo Collodi, Giovanni Spadolini, Giuseppe Prezzolini and Mario Luzi.

In 2004, the owners were Monrif (59.2%) and the RCS MediaGroup (9.9%). The publisher of La Nazione is Poligrafici Editoriali. The paper is published in tabloid format.

== Circulation ==
The 1988 circulation of La Nazione was 288,000 copies. Between 1998 and 2001 the paper had a 30% share of the Italian language newspaper market in Tuscany.

The circulation of the paper was 149,997 copies in 2001 and 143,554 copies in 2002. Its circulation was 145,000 copies in 2003 and 144,463 copies in 2004. The paper had a circulation of 138,000 copies in 2007 and 136,993 copies in 2008.

In 2012, La Nazione sold 52,653,953 copies.

== Notable journalists ==
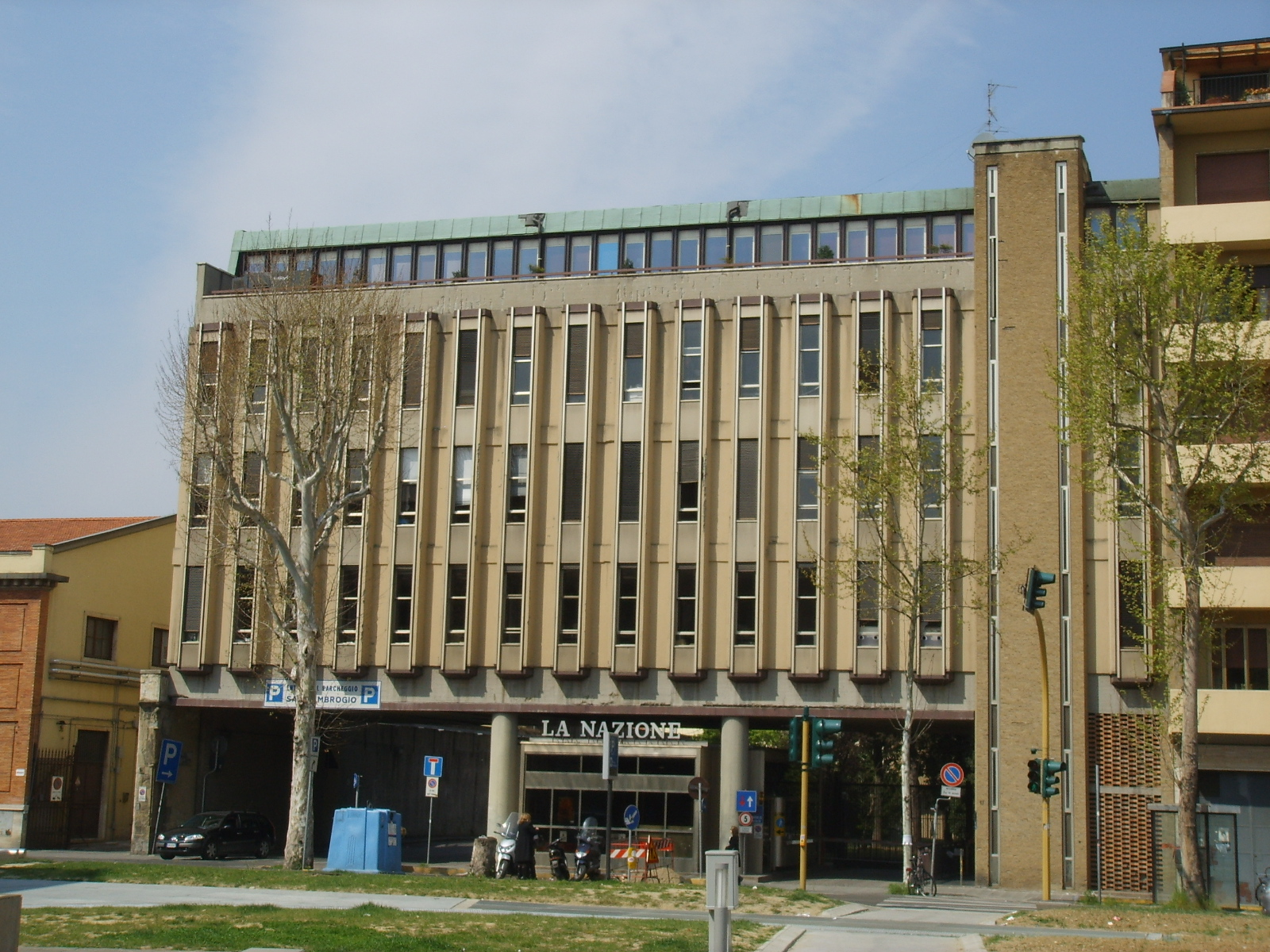
La Nazione editorial office in Florence

- Giuseppe Are (1930–2006), historian
- Umberto Cecchi, journalist
- Zeffiro Ciuffoletti, historian and columnist

== Editors ==
- Leopold Cempini: 14 July to 9 August 1859
- Alessandro D'Ancona: 10 August 1859 to 30 April 1860
- Piero Puccioni: from 1 May 1860 to 11 January 1869
- Raymond Brenna: from 12 January to 1 September 1869
- Giuseppe Civinini: 16 October 1869 to 19 December 1871
- Celestino Bianchi: 31 December 1871 to 29 June 1885
- Niccolò Nobili: 1 July 1885 to 17 October 1893
- Augusto Barazzuoli: 18 October 1893 to 31 January 1894
- Vico Mantegazza: 1 February 1894 to 15 June 1898
- Ettore Bernabei: 16 June 1898 to 31 December 1906
- Silvio Ghelli: 15 August 1910 to 6 November 1914
- Gustavo Nest: 17 November 1914 to 9 March 1915
- Aldo Borelli: 10 March 1915 to 31 August 1929
- Charles Scarfoglio (political director from 1919 to 1924)
- Umberto Guglielmotti: 1 September 1929 to 10 October 1932
- Maffio Maffii: 11 October 1932 to 27 July 1943
- Bruno Micheli: 28 July to 17 August 1943
- Charles Scarfoglio: from 18 August to 16 September 1943
- Ridolfo Mazzucconi: from 17 September to 18 October 1943
- Mirko Giobbe: From 19 October 1943 to 11 August 1944
- Suspended by a resolution of the Allied Command in Italy on 12 August, the publications were resumed in 1947 with the headline "The Italian nation"
- Julius Caprin: from 27 March 1947 to 31 October 1950
- Sandro Volta: from 1 November 1950 to 31 March 1952
- Panfilo Gentile: from 1 April to 31 October 1952
- Bruno Micheli: from 1 November 1952 to 3 January 1953
- Alfio Russo, from 4 January 1953 to 13 October 1961 (in 1959, the newspaper resumed its original name)
- Enrico Mattei: 14 October 1961 to 20 June 1970
- Domenico Bartoli: 21 June 1970 to 6 March 1977
- Alberto Sensini: from 17 March 1977 to 11 October 1980
- Gianfranco Piazzesi: 12 October 1980 to 17 November 1981
- Piero Magi from 18 November 1981 to 3 March 1985
- Tino Neirotti: 4 March 1985 to 29 November 1986
- Arrigo Petacco: 30 November 1986 to 16 November 1987
- Roberto Ch'un: from 17 November 1987 to 19 November 1988
- Roberto Gelmini: 20 November 1988 to 17 December 1991
- Gabriele Cané: 27 December 1991 to 13 May 1995
- Riccardo Berti: 14 May 1995 from 11 December 1997
- Andrea Biavardi: from 12 December 1997 to 29 November 1998
- Umberto Cecchi: 30 November 1998 to 17 April 2002
- Francis Carrassi: from 18 April 2002 to 29 November 2008
- Joseph Mascambruno: from 6 December 2008 to 15 July 2011
- Mauro Tedeschini: from 16 July 2011 to 18 April 2012
- Gabriele Canè: from 19 April 2012 to 12 April 2014
- Marcello Mancini: from 13 April 2014 to 28 February 2015
- Pierfrancesco De Robertis: from 1 March 2015 – present

== The 150th anniversary of its creation ==
The 150 years since the foundation has been recalled by a special stamp issued by the Italian post office. In addition to a special issue was organized series of conferences that have enhanced the role of Bettino Ricasoli when the foundation of the newspaper.

It has also produced a commemorative book at newsstand in January 2009, and a deluxe version in bookstores. The book, written by the historic signing of The Nation has been enriched by Maurizio Naldini pictorial performed by Luca Parenti, Marco Innocenti. The volume is divided into three parts, introduced by four professors and historians: Zefiro Ciuffoletti, Cosimo Cecchi and Sandro Rogai. A summary of this book have been printed 20 local cases, attached to the journal in different areas of diffusion, which follows the life of the everyday in relation to the city treated and re-reads a file that the development of advertising from 1859 to the present day in the newspaper founded Florentine by Bettino Ricasoli.

Among the other conventions of particular interest that will play on the future of agricultural resources and food that would feature the Foundation Old New Land, a youth association recently born in Florence between young teachers of the historical and natural materials for the study of the relationship between Earth and the needs of its inhabitants.

== See also ==
- List of newspapers in Italy
