= Caltagirone (surname) =

Caltagirone (Italian pronunciation: [kaltadʒiˈroːne]) is an Italian surname that may refer to

- Daniel Caltagirone (born 1972), English actor
- Francesco Bellavista Caltagirone (born 1939), Italian businessman, entrepreneur and philanthropist
- Francesco Gaetano Caltagirone (born 1943), Italian businessman, cousin of Francesco Bellavista
  - Caltagirone Editore, an Italian publishing house founded by Francesco Gaetano
- Thomas Caltagirone (born 1942), American politician
