= Fabio Corsico =

Italian manager

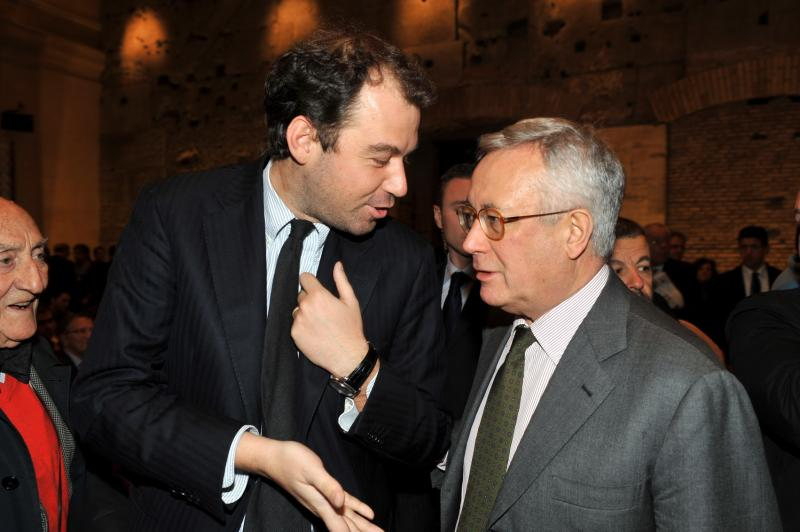
- Corsico with the former Italian Minister of Economy and Finances, Giulio Tremonti
- Born: October 20, 1973; Turin, Italy
- Occupations: Manager, senior advisor

Fabio Corsico is an Italian manager. He was born in Turin on October 20, 1973 and graduated in Political Science.

In 2011, he has been defined by the journalist Marianna Rizzini in the newspaper, Il Foglio, as one of the influencers under 40 in Italy.

== Career in public institutions ==
In 1997, he worked for the Italian Ministry of Defense, Beniamino Andreatta, at the Department of Diplomatic Counseling and the Military Center for Strategic Studies.

In 2001 he was Chief of Secretary of the Ministry of Economy and Finances Giulio Tremonti and member of the committee for the adoption of the Euro currency.

== Management activities ==
From 1998 until 2001, he worked in Infostrada and later took the role director of Public Affairs. In the same years he represented the Italian Association for the Information Technology (Assinform) and the Italian Association for Industrial Policies.

In 2003 he was Chief of Public and Territorial Affairs, of the relations with Confindustria of Enel.

Since February 2005, he has been director of External Relations, Public Affairs and Development of the Caltagirone Group.

In 2008, he became a member of the board of Fondazione CRT.

On January 15, 2008 he became a member of the board of Cementir Holding.

On April 29, 2009, he became a member of the board of Avio. He resigned a year later on August 11, 2010.

Since 2009 he has been a senior advisor of Credit Suisse for the Italian market.

In 2010 and 2011 he was a member of the board of the foundation of the Teatro Regio of Turin.

In 2013 he became director of the investments committee of Fondazione CRT, managing the shares in Unicredit, Mediobanca and Assicurazioni Generali.

On December 6, 2013 he became a member of the board of Banca della Svizzera Italiana.

In May 2014 Cassa depositi e prestiti appoints him as member of the board of Terna S.p.A.

== Publications ==
Corsico is the author of the following article:

- Gli interessi italiani di sicurezza (The Italian safety interests) published in the book Italiani e forze armate (Italians and armed forces) by Carlo Jean. The article has been written for the conference CASD-Limes-La Stampa "Il sistema Italia" (The system "Italy") held in Turin on May 23–24, 1997.

He is the author of the following books:

- Manager di famiglia 1st Edition Il Sole 24 Ore 2005, 244 pages, ISBN 9788863456073.
- Interessi nazionali e identità italiana (National Interest and Italian Identity) 1st Edition Franco Angeli Edizioni 1998, 160 pages, ISBN 9788846404312.
- Together with Paolo Messa, Da Frankenstein a principe azzurro. Le fondazioni bancarie fra passato e futuro (From Frankenstein to Prince Charming. Banking Foundations between past and future) Marsilio 2011, 135 pages, with the preface by Carlo Azeglio Ciampi, former President of the Italian Republic. The authors explore the roles and the legal context of Foundations in Italy, since their birth in 1990 following the legislation proposed by Giuliano Amato, the successive modifications by Carlo Azeglio Ciampi and today's debates.

The presentation to the public of the book Da Frankenstein a principe azzurro. Le fondazioni bancarie fra passato e futuro (From Frankenstein to Prince Charming. Banking Foundations between past and future) saw the participation of important players of the European and Italian economy, among those:

- Lorenzo Bini Smaghi, member of the executive committee of the European Central Bank, who held a speech during the presentation.
- Corrado Passera, former Italian Minister of the Economic Development, who spoke at the presentation about the relationship between banks and foundations.
- Roberto Napoletano (director of the financial newspaper "Il Sole 24 Ore", Giuliano Amato (former Italian Prime Minister, and President of Treccani), Giuseppe Mussari (President of the Associazione Bancaria Italiana), Giuseppe Guzzetti (President of the Fondazione Cariplo), Romano Prodi (former Italian Prime Minister, and professor at the University of Bologna), Giulio Tremonti (former Italian Minister of Economy).

== Bibliography ==
- Cazora Russo, Gaetana (1998). Crollo delle ideologie o silenzio dei valori? ("The collapse of idelogies or the silence of values"). FrancoAngeli. ISBN 9788846406132.
- Gentile, Sara (1998). Capo carismatico e democrazia: il caso De Gaulle ("Charismatic leader and democracy: the De Gaulle case"). FrancoAngeli. ISBN 9788846406637.
- Ferretti, Valdo; Giordano, Giancarlo (1999). "Politica/Studi". La Rinascita di una grande potenza: il rientro del Giappone nella società internazionale e l'età della Guerra Fredda ("The Rebirth of a great Power: the return of Japan to the international community and the age of the Cold War"). FrancoAngeli.
- Amato, Giuliano; Bonaccorsi, Andrea; Cassese, Sabino; Varaldo, Riccardo (2000). Lo sviluppo dell'economia digitale in Italia ("The development of digital economy in Italy"). FrancoAngeli. ISBN 9788846426130.
- Jean, Carlo (2004). Manuale di studi strategici ("Manual of strategic studies"). FrancoAngeli. p. 317. ISBN 9788846452788.
- Barattoni, Luca (2012). "Further Reading". Italian Post-neorealist Cinema. Edinburgh University Press. p. 263. ISBN 978-0748640546.
- Guzzini, Stefano (2012). The Return of Geopolitics in Europe?: Social Mechanisms and Foreign Policy Identity Crises. Cambridge University Press. p. 284. ISBN 9788846452788.
- Zanotti, Pierantonio; Pedullà, Gaetano (2012). L'inganno di Tangentopoli: Dialogo sull'Italia a vent'anni da Mani Pulite ("The scam of Tangentopoli: dialog on Italy twenty years after Mani Pulite"). Marsilio Editori. ISBN 9788831733786.
