= Johnny Ibrahim =

Lebanese diplomat

Johnny Ibrahim is a Lebanese diplomat who has served as Lebanon's ambassador to Argentina. Johnny was posted to the Holy See in 2017 but was rejected by Pope Francis. The media initially reported that the rejection was due to leaking to the media the posting of Ibrahim to the Vatican before his official acceptance. But later a Lebanese publication Libnannews quoting Italian daily Il Messaggero wrote that the rejection was due to Ibrahim's alleged ties to freemasons, a group the Pope had been critical of. On 24 October 2017 Libnanews reported that Ibrahim had admitted being close to Masonic lodges many years ago but had now distanced himself from the group.
