= Pacifici =

Pacifici is a surname. Notable people with the surname include:

- Giorgio Pacifici (born 1939), Italian sociologist
- Maria Cristina Pacifici (born 1945), Italian freestyle swimmer
- Matt Pacifici (born 1993), American soccer player
- Riccardo Pacifici (1904–1943), Italian rabbi

== See also ==
- Maris Pacifici, map
