= Blu (Italian company) =

Telecommunications company

Blu S.p.A.
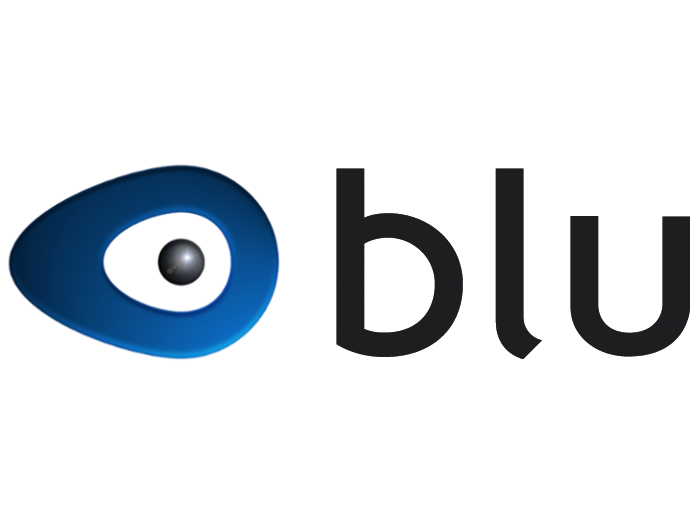
- Type: Subsidiary
- Industry: Telecommunications
- Founded: April 19, 1999; 27 years ago
- Founder: Società Austostrade; British Telecom; Edizione Holding; Mediaset; BNL; Italgas; Caltagirone Editore
- Defunct: October 8, 2002
- Fate: Transfer to other companies
- Successor: Wind
- Headquarters: Naples, Italy
- Area served: Italy
- Products: Mobile telephony
- Owner: Società Austostrade (32%); British Telecom (20%); Edizione Holding (9%); Mediaset (9%); BNL (7%); Italgas (7%); Caltagirone Editore (7%)
- Number of employees: 1900 (2001)
- Parent: Wind
- Website: www.blu.it

Blu S.p.A. was an Italian telecommunications company operating in the mobile telephony sector.

It was active between 1999 and 2002.

== History ==
The company was founded in 1999, through a partnership between Società Autostrade (through Sitec, 32%), British Telecom (20%), Benetton (through the financial Edizione Holding, 9%), Mediaset (9%), Distacom (9%), BNL (7%), Italgas (7%), Caltagirone (7%) and Palatinus. Its slogan was "Il futuro che non c'era" ("The future that was not there").

Its service began on May 15, 2000, using license number 61, issued shortly after the launch by the Italian Ministry of Communications. The services were valid for communications through the GSM system on the 1800 MHz frequency band; the signal with its own network was initially irradiated only in Milan while, in the rest of Italy, the transmission occurred within the GSM network of other operators thanks to national roaming agreements.

With 430,000 users in September 2000, the company exceeded its initial target of 350,000 customers by the end of the year. Also, the disagreement between British Telecom and the other shareholders with regard to distributing shares put the company's participation in the auction for the awarding of UMTS licenses, which were initially confirmed, in question. They were withdrawn on October 23. The case involved judicial trials that ended in January 2001 when the Lazio Regional Administrative Court annulled the government confiscation of the surety of 4 trillion lire.

In December 2000, the company continued its development, launching a GPRS service which exceeded one million users in March 2001. In August of the same year, the company acquired the license for fixed telephony. Despite the continued expansion, with 1,600,000 customers at the end of 2001 and a market share of new activations of 13%, the first defections began among the company's partners. Edition renounced its shares in September 2001 after entry into the Telecom Italia group, and Mediaset followed in when it sold its shares in December 2001 to British Telecom.

The company entered a phase of progressive demobilization. On August 6, 2002, the board of directors gave the go-ahead to the company break-up, opting for the sale of the customer base (4% of the Italian market) and brand to Wind, its mobile telephony systems to TIM, Wind and Vodafone Omnitel, the share capital at TIM and other branches of the company at H3G.

Blu transferred its assets to other companies on October 8, 2002.
