= Leggo =

Italian newspaper

- Front page (Turin edition), 3 October 2008
- Type: Free daily newspaper (Published from Monday to Friday)
- Owner: Caltagirone Editore
- Founded: March 2001
- Language: Italian
- Headquarters: Rome, Italy
- Circulation: 1,050,000
- Website: http://www.leggo.it/

Leggo (Italian for 'I read') is an Italian newspaper and was the first free daily newspaper published in Italy.

== History and profile ==
Leggo was established by Caltagirone Editore, owned by Francesco Gaetano Caltagirone, in 2001.

It publishes 15 local editions for the cities of Rome, Milan, Turin, Naples, Bologna, Florence, Padua, Venice, Verona, Bari, Genoa, Como, Bergamo, Brescia and Varese, with a total circulation of 1,050,000 copies.

In the period of 2001–2002 Leggo had a circulation of 715,000 copies.
