= Giuseppe Sacco =

- Born: Naples, Italy
- Occupations: professor, essayist. company director
- Spouse: Daniela Colombo
- Relatives: Concetta "Teta" Sacco (sister) married with it:Francesco Guizzi

Giuseppe Sacco (born 1 August 1938) is a tenured Italian academic specialising in international relations, with secondary interests in the fields of international economic relations, industrial and science and technology policy, international oil, the environment, and international migrations. He holds a Diplôme at the École des Hautes Études en Sciences Sociales of the University of Paris-Sorbonne, as well as a doctoral degree in political science from the University of Naples, where he also spent three years in the department of engineering. In 1966 he obtained a Fulbright scholarship at Columbia University and, early in his career, he has also been, with a Ford Foundation grant, visiting scientist at "Resources for the Future" (Brookings Institution, Washington, DC) and at the Massachusetts Institute of Technology.

== Academic career ==
From 1980 until 2010 Sacco was a professor at the Faculty of Political Sciences of the Libera Università Internazionale degli Studi Sociali Guido Carli, where he taught International Relations and World Economic Systems, Development Sociology and International Migrations. During the period 1970-1980, he was in charge as a full professor of Industrial Economics and Policy at the University of Florence, and from 1981 to 1985 at the University of Calabria. From 1989 to 2000, he taught at the Institut d'Etudes Politiques de Paris. He has also been a visiting professor at the University of Oxford, University of San Francisco, University of California, Los Angeles, Princeton University, and the Federal University of Pernambuco. Early in his career, he was a visiting scientist at "Resources for the Future" of the Brookings Institution and at the Massachusetts Institute of Technology. His fields of research are: International Political Economy, World Economic Systems and International Migrations. He has always had connections and collaborations with several international magazines and newspapers. As a knowledgeable analyst on International and European social and interrelated economic phenomena and issues, Sacco has often been interviewed by international journals and international broadcasting channels. He has been invited as a lecturer to many international conferences and meetings.

Sacco has been in charge as the coordinator and scientist of numerous research projects. In 2006 he was in charge of the Research program of the Ministry of Education, Universities and Research of Italy, in 1992 he was the director of the research project on "Immigration and Security Problems in Western Europe for the Italian Military Centre for Strategic Studies"; in 1991, he was the director of the "Feasibility Study on Solar Energy Production in the Sahara Region" in Algiers; in 1989, he was the director of economic and social studies "The Moscow Techno-park Project" at the Russian Academy of Sciences; in 1984 he was head of a mission for three feasibility studies in Malaysia for the Istituto nazionale per il Commercio Estero (ICE; National Institute for Foreign Trade)(furnishings, prefabricated building components, advanced technologies for food conservation); and in 1981 and 1982, he was the director of the ICE feasibility study on the setting up of a fish-farming plant on Lake Habbaniya (Iraq).

He has also been a strategic analyst and consultant of Public and International Bodies, Multinational Companies. In the last decade, he focused his attention on Chinese development and the outcome on USA, Europe and the global economy.

His latest work is "Batman and Joker: the Self Representation of America", published in Italy and soon to have a second edition in print.

== International experience ==
From 1976 to 1980, Sacco was the division director at the Organisation for Economic Co-operation and Development and was in charge of long term forecasting about the evolution of world manufacturing in the framework of the North-South Inter-Futures Project, also known as the "WA" (harmony) project. In addition, Sacco worked for the European Commission and as Italian representative at several international conferences and organizations concerning the protection of the environment, such as the United Nations Conference on the Human Environment (1972) and the International Maritime Organization. Sacco has assisted as an international consultant to several national institutions, international organizations, and multinational corporations in over 40 countries. He has consulted for the Italian Chamber of Deputies, the Agency for the Development of Kazakhstan, Enel, the Nigerian Salt Refining Co., Lavalin, the Italian Ministry of Foreign Affairs, the African Development Bank, Organisation for Economic Co-operation and Development, the Asian Development Bank, and Masterfood Int.

== Publications ==
Sacco wrote and contributed to several international revues, such as: New Society, Géopolitique, Preuves, Commentary,Internationale Politik, The International Spectator, Commentaire, The Washington Quarterly, Politica Exterior, Politique Etrangère, Sociétal, Outre-Terre and Limes, The Wilson Quarterly and Lettera Internazionale. He is member of the Editorial and Scientific Committee of Limes, Commentaire, Commentary and Outre-Terre. In addition, Sacco is a (co-)author of:

- Critica del Nuovo Secolo, Luiss University Press, Rome, 2005. ISBN 978-88-88877-87-7
- Que se vayan: l'America Latina nel sistema mondiale, Sankara, Rome, 2002 ISBN 88-900572-2-X
- La Polis Internet, with Giorgio Pacifici, Paul Mathias, Pieraugusto Pozzi, foreword of Francesco De Domenico; in cooperation with Institut d'Etudes Politiques of Paris, Milano : F. Angeli, [2000], translation from French into Italian by Ugo G. Pacifici Noja, Angeli, ISBN 88-464-2197-3
- L'Invasione scalza: movimenti migratori e sicurezza nazionale, Franco Angeli, Milan, 1997 ISBN 88-204-9999-1
- Meno vincoli per l'impresa(Asian EPZs, and Europe), Euroforum, Brussels, 1989 ISBN 88-204-5601-X
- La Cooperazione Industriale con I PVS, Il Mulino, Bologna, 1982
- Industria e Potere Mondiale, Franco Angeli, Milan, 1980 ISBN 88-204-1858-4
- Il Nuovo Medio Evo, Bompiani, Milan, 1972 (with Umberto Eco, Francesco Alberoni and it: Furio Colombo) OCLC Number: 883973
- Il Mezzogiorno nella Politica Scientifica, Etas Kompass, Milan, 1969 OCLC Number: 9794131
