= Francesco Gaetano Caltagirone =

Italian businessman

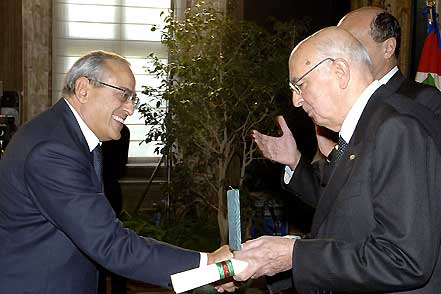
- Caltagirone with Giorgio Napolitano, President of the Italian Republic
- Born: 2 March 1943 (age 83); Rome, Italy
- Other names: Francesco Caltagirone, Franco Caltagirone
- Occupation: Businessman
- Known for: Owns more than 50% of Caltagirone S.p.A.
- Spouse: Luisa Farinon
- Children: 3

Caltagirone S.p.A.
- Traded as: FTSE Italia Mid Cap

Francesco Gaetano Caltagirone (Italian pronunciation: [franˈtʃesko ɡa.eˈtaːno kaltadʒiˈroːne]; born 2 March 1943) is an Italian businessman. He controls the holding company Caltagirone S.p.A. with interests in cement manufacturing, real estate, construction and publishing (with Caltagirone Editore).

As of 2026, Caltagirone was ranked number #289 on the 2026 Forbes billionaire list and #5 in Italy, with an estimated net worth of $11.1 billion.

== Early life ==
Francesco Gaetano Caltagirone was born in Rome into a large family composed almost entirely of manufacturers. His grandfather constructed the first buildings in Palermo in the last decades of the 1800s.

== Career ==
While studying at the faculty of engineering in Rome, Caltagirone and his brothers Edoardo Francesco Caltagirone and Leonardo Francesco Caltagirone resumed the family business that had been interrupted in the forties because of the sudden death of their father. With the inherited capital, the brothers started the company together with their cousin Gaetano Caltagirone, an architect already working as a manufacturer.

Francesco Gaetano Caltagirone became a partner in the company. Since then the group (today known as the Caltagirone Group or Caltagirone S.p.A.) has constructed approximately 200 real estate complexes, composed of nearly 800 buildings with a total area of close to 3.3 million square metres and a value of €15 billion.

In the seventies, the equity balance between Francesco Gaetano Caltagirone and his cousin Gaetano Caltagirone was changed, and Francesco Gaetano Caltagirone became part of the majority shareholders – on an equal footing with his brother Edoardo Francesco Caltagirone.

In 1984, he took over Vianini Lavori S.p.A. – now part of the Caltagirone Group – which operates worldwide in the field of large infrastructure projects. He became president of the company. After a complete industrial restructuring, he carried out the listing of the two subsidiaries, Vianini Lavori S.p.A. Industry and Vianini Industria S.p.A.

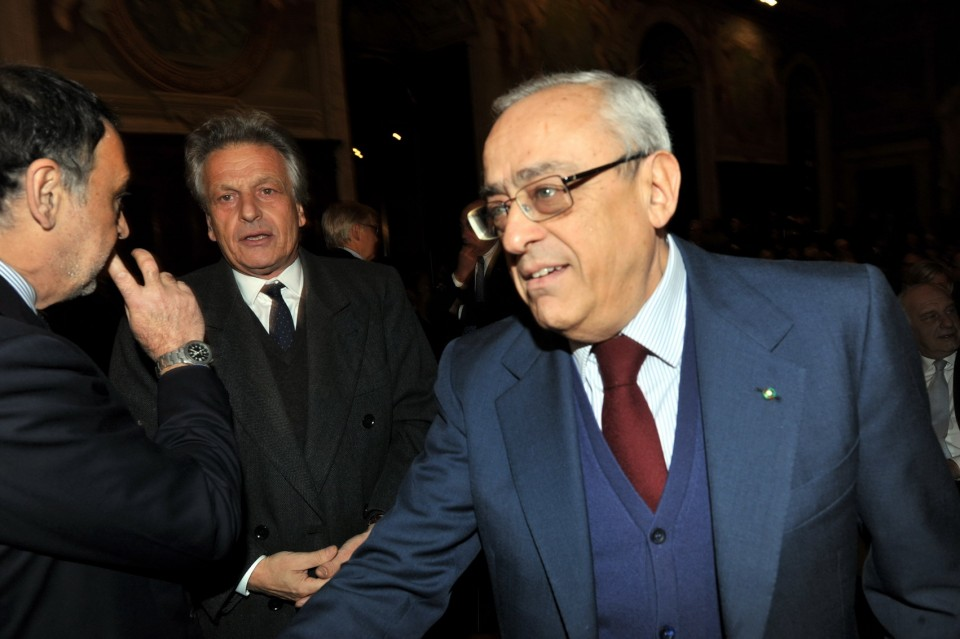
President Francesco Gaetano Caltagirone at the “Restyling Party” for the Il Messaggero newspaper, held in Milan in December 2012

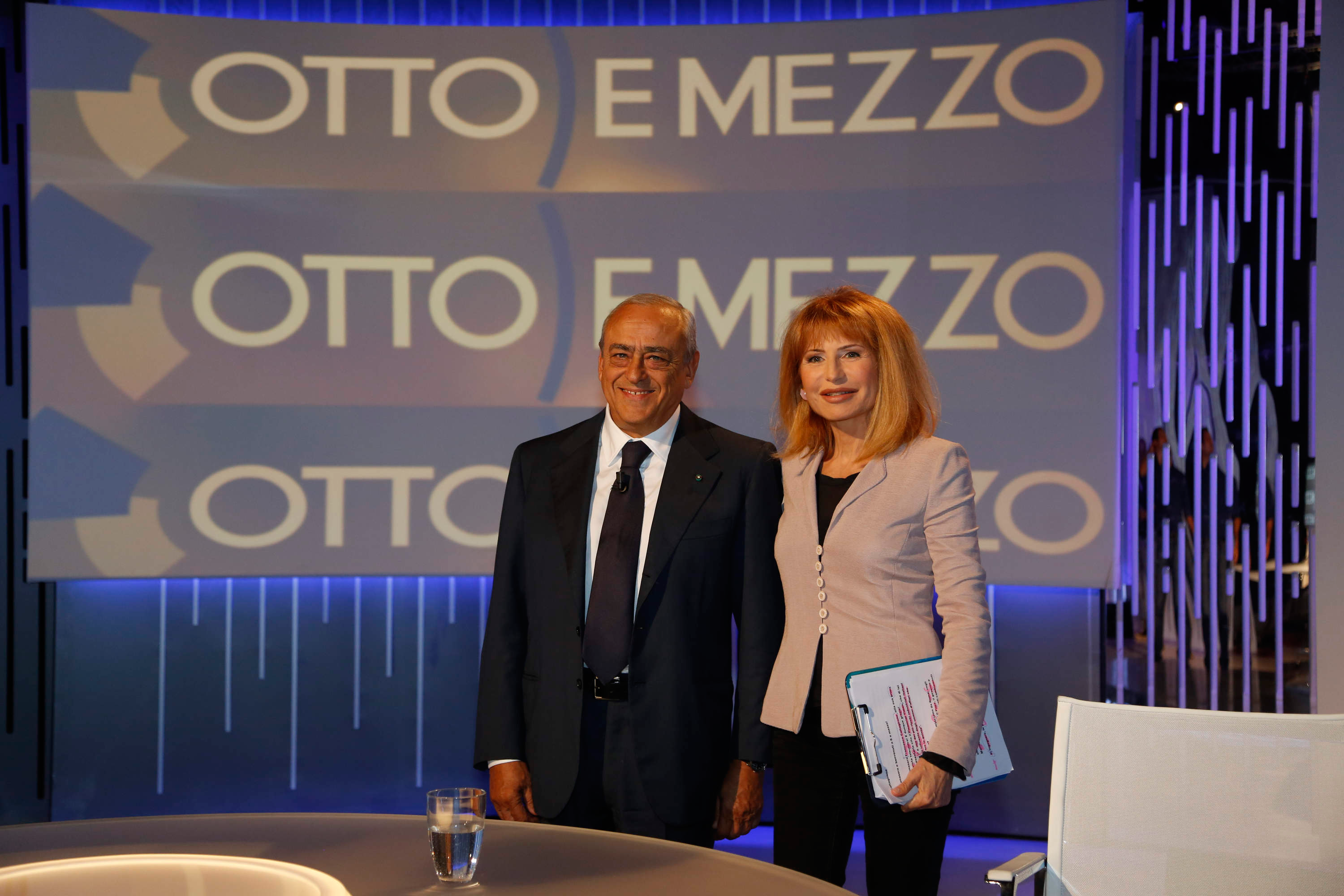
President Francesco Gaetano Caltagirone interviewed at Lilly Gruber's television program Otto e Mezzo on La7 channel

In 1992, he took over Cementir S.p.A., the fourth biggest Italian company in the cement industry, acquired by IRI (Istituto per la Ricostruzione Industriale) through a public auction. In a few years, under the guidance of his son Francesco Caltagirone Jr., Cementir S.p.A. became a multinational company with a significant presence in Scandinavia, Turkey and the Far East. About 80% of the turnover is produced outside Italy.

In the mid-nineties, he assumed full control of the Caltagirone Group joining his shares with those of his cousin Gaetano Caltagirone in the company Finanziaria Italia. Francesco Gaetano Caltagirone holds approximately 70% of Finanziaria Italia, which controls about 51% of Caltagirone S.p.A.

In 1996, he acquired the Roman newspaper Il Messaggero from the Montedison Group, and the following year two local newspapers from private investors: Il Mattino based in Naples and Corriere Adriatico based in Ancona.

Since 2000, all publishing and new media have been clustered in the Caltagirone Editore publishing group – the fifth biggest group in Italy. In 2006 he acquired the majority stake in the newspaper Il Gazzettino based in Venice.

Francesco Gaetano Caltagirone is a member of the Executive Committee of Confindustria and the Committee of the President of the Italian Federation of Newspaper Publishers, and he is a director of the Auditorium Parco della Musica of Rome.

In 2006, he was appointed a Knight of the Order of Merit for Labour. In the same year, he became vice-president of Banca Monte dei Paschi di Siena. Until early 2012, when he liquidated his share completely, he was the second largest shareholder and the most important private individual shareholder. In 2007 he was appointed Director of Assicurazioni Generali S.p.A., of which he was appointed Vice President in April 2010.

== Personal life ==
He is married to Luisa Farinon (the sister of former TV presenter Gabriella) and has three children: Francesco Jr., Alessandro and Azzurra, the ex-wife of the Italian politician Pier Ferdinando Casini.

== Most important subsidiaries ==
- Caltagirone S.p.A.
- Cementir S.p.A.
- Caltagirone Editore S.p.A.
- Vianini Lavori S.p.A.
- Vianini Industria S.p.A.

== Other important participations ==
- Assicurazioni Generali S.p.A. (6.28%)
- Banca Monte dei Paschi (10.26%)
- Acea S.p.A. (5.45%)

== Honors and awards ==
- Italy: Knight of the Order of Merit for Labour 1 June 2006
