= Filippo Taverriti =

Italian writer (1902–1976)

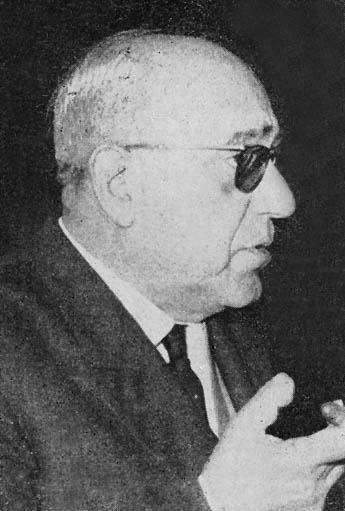
- Born: July 19, 1902
- Died: March 29, 1976 (aged 73)
- Occupations: journalist, essayist, lexicographer

Filippo Aliquò Taverriti (Reggio Calabria, 19 July 1902 – Reggio Calabria, 29 March 1976 ) was an Italian journalist, essayist and lexicographer.

== Biography ==
Taverriti was the son of the writer and librarian Luigi Aliquò Lenzi. He began his journalistic activity at a very young age: at just twenty he collaborated with Orazio Cipriani's Corriere di Calabria. From 1937, he directed the monthly Reggio Emilia Agricoltura e Commercio (which was founded in 1936 as the continuation of the periodical L'agricoltura Calabrese).

Taverriti was a correspondent for numerous national newspapers such as Il Messaggero, and a co-director of the newspaper La Voce di Calabria after the Second World War. In 1953, he founded the weekly newspaper Corriere di Reggio, which lasted until the mid-1990s.

Taverriti was also active in the regional political life, having been among the founders of the Christian Democracy in Calabria.

With his father Luigi, he was the co-founder of the second edition of the bio-bibliographic dictionary of Calabrian writers, as well as the author of historical essays including those covering the 1908 Messina earthquake, and the monograph on the contribution of the Calabrieni to Garibaldi's undertaking.

He was the father of Luigi Aliquò, an Italian lawyer, politician, journalist, and historian.
