= Quotidiano di Puglia =

Italian daily newspaper

- Type: Daily newspaper
- Format: Tabloid
- Owner: Caltagirone Editore
- Founder: Beppe Lopez
- Founded: 1979; 47 years ago
- Language: Italian
- Headquarters: Lecce, Italy
- Circulation: 19,500 (2010)
- Website: quotidianodipuglia.it

The Quotidiano di Puglia (Italian pronunciation: [kwotiˈdjaːno di ˈpuʎʎa]; lit. 'Daily of Apulia') is an Italian daily newspaper based in Lecce.

== History ==
The newspaper was founded by Beppe Lopez. Originally titled the Quotidiano di Lecce, Brindisi e Taranto, it was first published on 6 June 1979. It was acquired by Caltagirone Editore in the late 1990s, and its name was changed to Nuovo Quotidiano di Puglia.

== Notable personnel ==
- Alessandro Barbano
- Annarita Invidia
- Beppe Lopez
- Enzo Lucchi
- Antonio Maglio
- Giancarlo Minicucci
- Giulio Mastroianni
- Renato Moro
- Franco Prattico
- Claudio Scamardella
- Francesco Spada
