= Corriere Adriatico =

Italian newspaper

- Type: Daily newspaper
- Owner: Caltagirone Editore Group
- Publisher: Corriere Adriatico SPA
- Founded: 1860; 166 years ago
- Language: Italian
- Headquarters: Ancona
- Country: Italy
- Sister newspapers: Il Messaggero
- Website: www.corriereadriatico.it

Corriere Adriatico is a regional daily newspaper, one of the oldest publications in Italy. It has been in circulation since 1860. The headquarters of the paper is in Ancona.

== History and profile ==
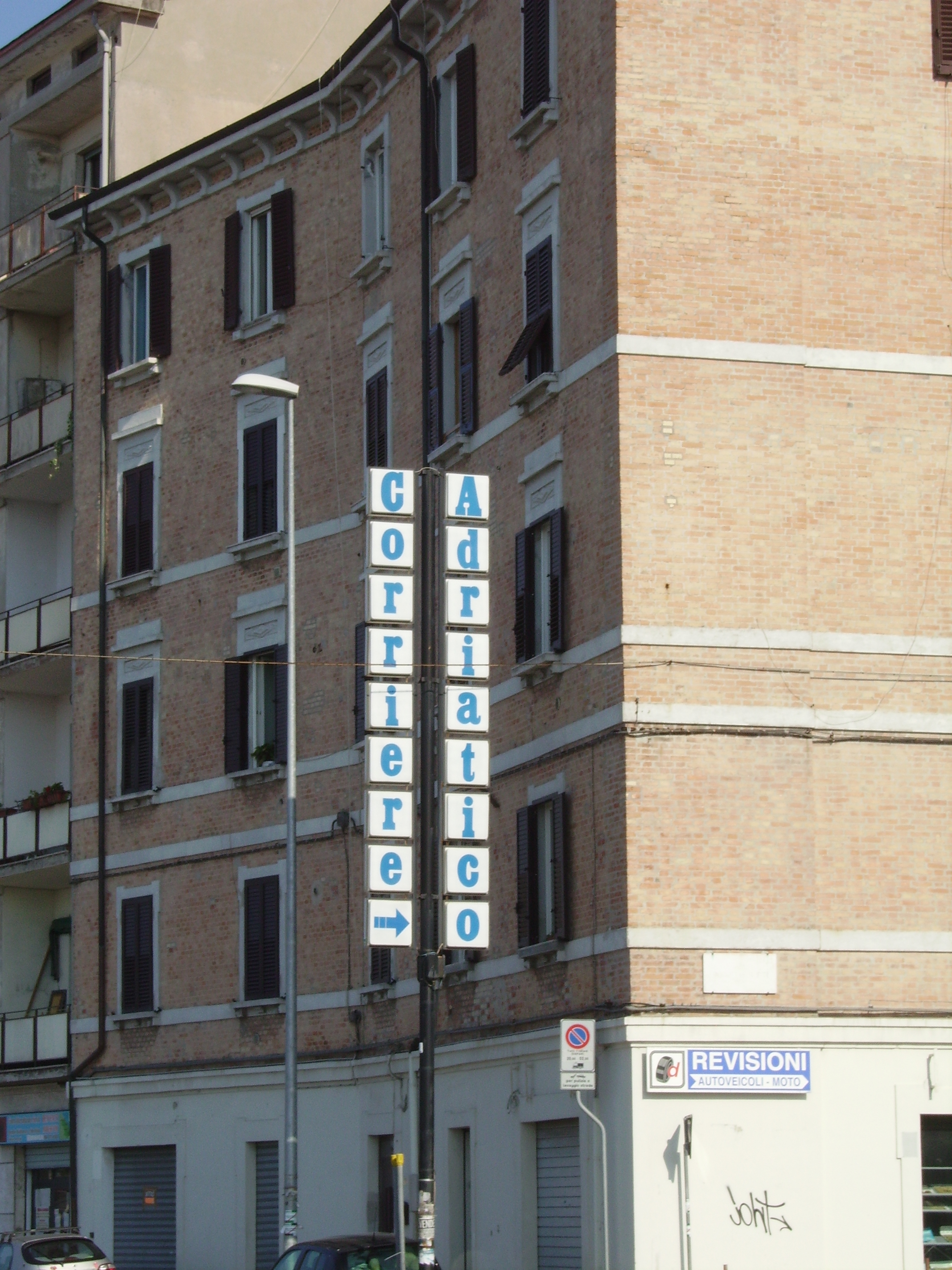
Headquarters of Corriere Adriatico in Ancona

Corriere Adriatico was established in 1860. The paper is among the newspapers published in the Marche region. Specifically, it is based in Ancona. During the Fascist rule in Italy Corriere Adriatico was controlled by the National Fascist Party (FNP).

Since 2004 the owner has been the Caltagirone Editore Group which also owns Il Mattino and Il Messaggero, among others. Corriere Adriatico is published by a company with the same name.

Corriere Adriatico launched a color version in 2006. There are five editions of the paper, which are distributed in Ancona, Pesaro, Macerata, Ascoli Piceno and Fermo. It has also the online and digital versions.

Corriere Adriatico includes sections of news, sport, regular columns and promotional initiatives.

On its 150th anniversary of the establishment a commemorative stamp was published by the post of Italy.

Corriere Adriatico sold 19,400 copies in 2007.

== See also ==
- List of newspapers in Italy
