= Il Gazzettino =

Italian daily local newspaper

- Front page, 31 May 2009
- Type: Daily newspaper
- Format: broadsheet
- Owner(s): Società Editrice Padana (67.21% – Caltagirone Editore)
- Founded: March 1887
- Language: Italian
- Headquarters: Venice, Italy
- Circulation: 86,996 (2008)
- Website: Il Gazzettino

Il Gazzettino (lit. 'The Little Gazette') is an Italian daily local newspaper, based in Mestre, Italy a borough of Venice. It is the main newspaper in the Northeast Italy and is one of the oldest newspapers in Italy.

== Profile ==
Il Gazzettino has the following eight local editions:

1. Venice
2. Treviso
3. Padua
4. Belluno
5. Rovigo
6. Vicenza-Bassano
7. Friuli (Udine)
8. Pordenone

In 2006 the Rome-based publishing company Caltagirone Editore acquired the majority stake of Il Gazzettino's publishing company, Società Editrice Padana (which also owns TeleFriuli).

The circulation of Il Gazzettino was 136,092 copies in 1997. It was 109,594 copies in 2004. The paper had a circulation of 86,996 copies in 2008.
