= Aalborg Portland =

Danish cement-producing company

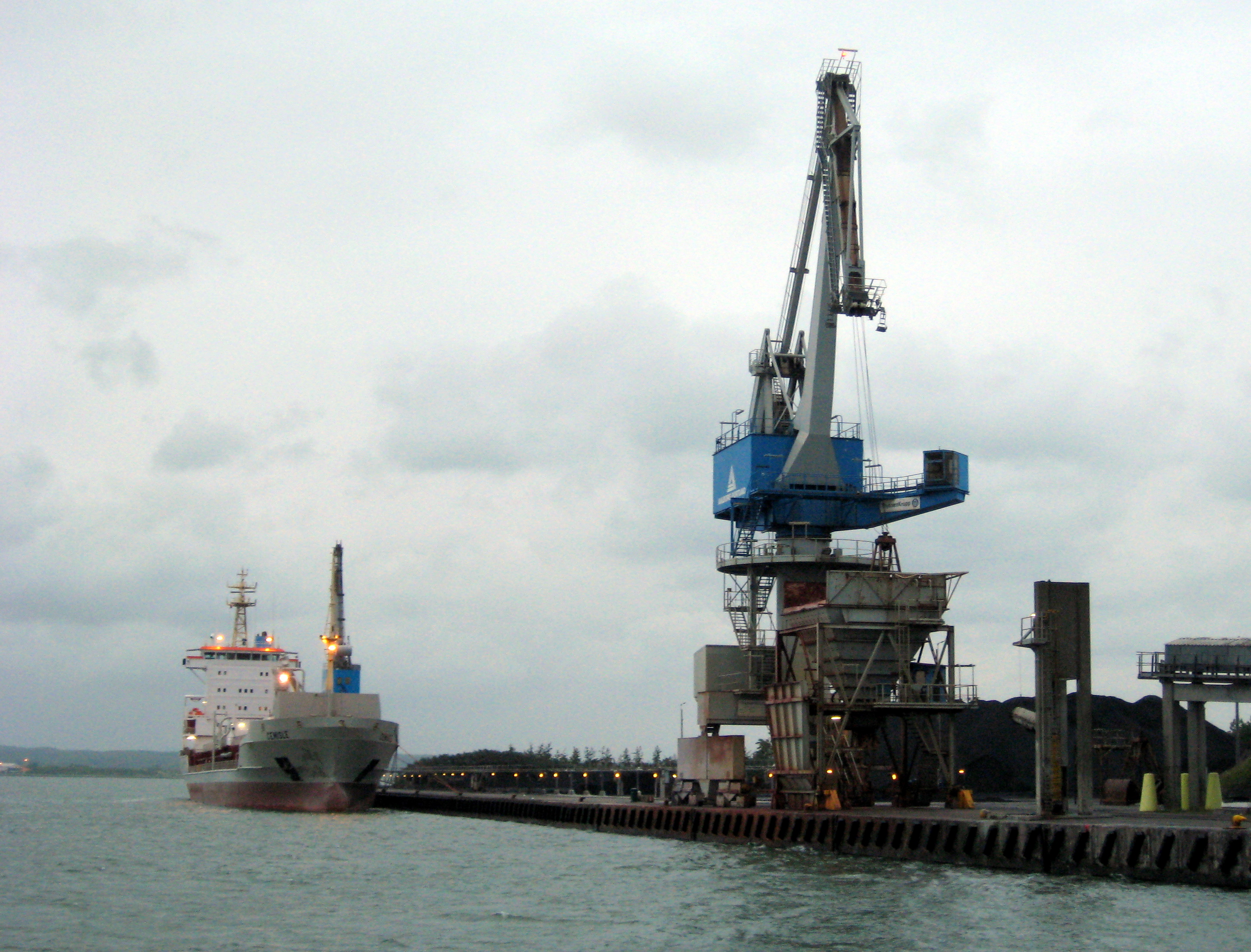
The cement carrier Cemisle at Aalborg Portland.

Aalborg Portland is a cement-producing company in Denmark. It was established in Aalborg in the 19th century. Portland cement was patented in 1824 by the Englishman Joseph Aspdin. Six decades later the Aalborg businessman Hans Holm and the engineer Frederick Læssøe Smidth built a cement factory 4 kilometres (2.5 mi) northeast of Aalborg in the town of Rørdal.

The Aalborg Portland-Cement Factory was founded in 1889. Aalborg Portland produces four major products: grey cement, white cement, ready-mixed concrete and aggregates. In 1898, the company's growth accelerated after it purchased two rotary kilns from the Philadelphia-based company Laxhbury & Spackman. In 2009 the Sinai White Portland Cement division became the "biggest white cement integrated plant worldwide in terms of capacity". Since 2003, the company is a subsidiary of Cementir Holding S.p.A. The sale was approved by competition authorities in 2004. In 2013 it had a workforce of over 1,500.

In 2019, Aalborg Portland had 335 employees in Denmark.

== Impact on climate change ==
Aalborg Portland is considered the biggest polluter in Denmark. The emissions of the industrial company in 2018 were equivalent to 2.2 million tons of CO_{2}, or 4% of the national CO_{2} emissions.

According to the Danish Economic Council, the cement industry does not have a sufficient economic interest to reduce its CO_{2} emissions, because the price to pollute is too low. In 2022, Aalborg Portland announced a corporate roadmap that sets an emissions ceiling target of no more than 600,000 tons by 2030.
