= Cementir Holding =

- Type: Private
- Traded as: FTSE Italia Mid Cap
- Industry: Building materials
- Founded: 1947
- Headquarters: Italy
- Products: cement, construction aggregate, concrete

Cementir Holding S.p.A., incorporated in 1947 in Rome, Italy, is a holding company with subsidiaries manufacturing cement and concrete, principally in Turkey and Denmark. The holding is the leading producer of cement in Denmark and of ready-mix concrete in Scandinavia, as well as one of the main producers in Turkey. It also has a significant presence in Italy. The company's products include precast concrete for the engineering and transport sectors. Its research and development activities are based in Denmark and Italy.

== History ==
In 1947, the company was incorporated as Cementir – Cementerie del Tirreno by the Italian state-owned company Istituto per la Ricostruzione Industriale (IRI); its early activities sought to make use of the slag produced by the blast furnaces of steelworks. In 1952, the firm opened its first cement plant at Bagnoli alongside an existing steelworks.

In 1955, the firm was listed on the Borsa Italiana.

Throughout the 1950s and 1960s, Cementir expanded its operations via the completion of several acquisitions as well as investments in new plants across Italy.

During the early 1990s, the Italian government opted to privatise Cementir via the sale of IRI's controlling stake in the firm. In February 1992, to satisfy the recommendations of the European Commission on the limitation of the public enterprise competition in the competitive economy domain, the IRI-Finsider Group held the majority of capital (51.78 percent) in the Italian construction group. Caltagirone S.p.A. for the sum of ₤480 billion lires.

In 2001, Cementir was relisted on the Borsa Italiana.

In September 2017, Cementir announced the sale of several Italy-based assets to the German building materials firm HeidelbergCement in exchange for €315 million. One year later, Cementir expanded its ownership in the Lehigh White Cement Company to 63.25 percent via a transaction with HeidelbergCement.

In early 2022, the firm recorded significant revenue increases across the Turkey, Europe, US and Malaysian markets.

On account of the large CO₂ emissions involved in cement production, Cementir has made efforts to mitigate its climate impacts. In December 2020, the Carbon Disclosure Project rated the firm as a "B" rated organization, up from previously being assigned an F rating. In October 2024, in partnership with the French industrial gases specialist Air Liquide, Cementir launched a joint decarbonization project, named ACCSION, to significantly reduce CO₂ emissions at the firm's cement plant in Aalborg.

In August 2024, Cementir expanded its stake in Sinai White Portland Cement Co SAE to 96.5 percent in exchange for €30 million.

In December 2025, the company sold its stake in Kars Cimento AS to Arkoz Madencilik AS in exchange for €51 million. In July 2026, through its Danish subsidiary Aalborg Portland Holding A/S, Cementir wholly acquired Nymølle Stenindustrier A/S.

== Board of directors ==
The following people serve on the board of directors as of December 2013:

- President: Francesco Caltagirone Jr.
- Vice President: Carlo Carlevaris (independent)
- Chief Executive Officer: Francesco Caltagirone Jr.
- Board Member: Alessandro Caltagirone
- Board Member: Azzurra Caltagirone
- Board Member: Edoardo Caltagirone
- Board Member: Saverio Caltagirone
- Board Member: Flavio Cattaneo (independent)
- Board Member: Mario Ciliberto
- Board Member: Paolo Di Bendetto (independent)
- Board Member: Fabio Corsico
- Board Member: Mario Delfini
- Board Member: Alfio Marchini (independent)
- Board Member: Riccardo Nicolini
- Board Member: Mario Ciliberto

== Main shareholders ==
Francesco Gaetano Caltagirone controls 66.75% of the shares of Cementir.

== See also ==
- Aalborg Portland
