= Francesco Bellavista Caltagirone =

Italian businessman and entrepreneur

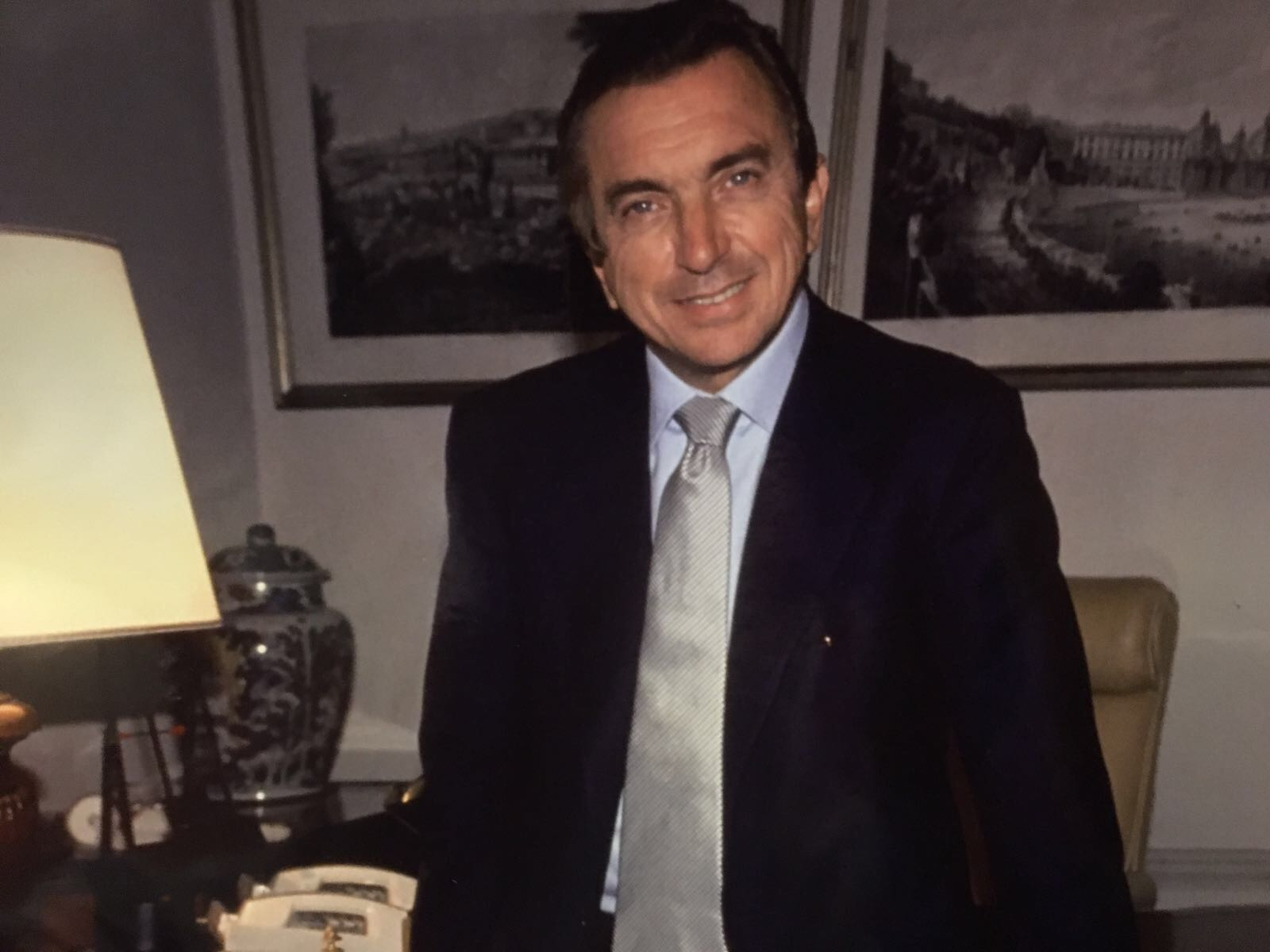
- Francesco Bellavista Caltagirone
- Born: February 18, 1939 (age 87); Rome, Italy
- Other names: Francesco Caltagirone
- Occupations: Real estate entrepreneur, businessman
- Years active: 1962-present
- Spouse(s): Marina Palma (m. 1970; div. 1986); Rita Rovelli (m. 1992; div. 2006)
- Children: 7

Francesco Bellavista Caltagirone (born 18 February 1939), is an Italian businessman, entrepreneur, philanthropist, former Chairman of Acqua Marcia Group, former shareholder of CAI (Compagnia Aerea Italiana S.p.A.), former director at Alitalia.

== Personal life ==
Francesco Bellavista Caltagirone was born in Rome into a Sicilian family composed by real estate developers, whose buildings date back to the nineteenth century. The founder of this real estate dynasty was Francesco's great-grandfather Ignazio Caltagirone.

After a short period in the family business, he studied economics in Rome at the faculty of Economics & Commerce. In 1962, at the age of 23, he created his own business.

In 1970, he married his first wife Marina Palma, whose father Franco was the President of Squibb Italy, the first company to introduce penicillin to postwar Italy.

He had four children from that first marriage: Maria-Letizia, Giulia, Ignazio and Gaetano. They were divorced in 1986.

In 1992 Francesco Bellavista Caltagirone married Rita Rovelli, daughter of Nino Rovelli, founder and sole shareholder of SIR-Rumianca. They had three children from this union: Camillo, Tancredi and Carlotta. Francesco and Rita were divorced in 2006.

== Career ==
From 1962 to 1979 Francesco Bellavista Caltagirone built essentially in Italy, emerging as one of the top Italian real estate developers. From 1980 to 1989 he worked internationally, developing real estate in the United States, Canada, Venezuela and Brazil. In 1984 he was one of the founders of ENGECO S.A.M. (Entreprise Générale de Construction) in Monaco with Stefano Casiraghi. Between the Sixties and the Nineties, he was at the forefront of around 500 real estate operations.

In 1994 he acquired Società dell’Acqua Pia Antica Marcia, founded in 1868 with the aim of bringing back to Rome Acqua Antica Marcia, one of the longest of the 11 aqueducts that supplied the city of ancient Rome. Italy's oldest real-estate company was reorganized around various branches, each one handling one specific aspect of the business, ranging from building constructions to seaports, airports and hotels. With Francesco Bellavista Caltagirone at its helm, the company managed around 1000 real estate developments from the north to the south of Italy.

Acqua Marcia Turismo led several projects aiming at the recovery of historic residences and their transformation into luxury hotels. Among these projects, the most famous are probably those realized in Sicily (Grand Hotel Excelsior in Catania, Grand Hotel Villa Igiea in Palermo, Excelsior Palace and the Grand Hotel des Etrangers & Miramar in Siracuse) and in Venice (Hilton Molino Stucky).

In the airport sector, commercial services and airport management of Linate's private airport was handled by ATA Handling and Ali Trasporti Aerei.

Francesco Bellavista Caltagirone was shareholder of CAI (Compagnia Aerea Italiana S.p.A.), the holding company of the former Italian flag carrier Alitalia and was on the Board of Directors from 2009 to 2012

He was part of the Executive Committee of the Aspen Institute, which is dedicated to “fostering enlightened leadership, the appreciation of timeless ideas and values, and open-minded dialogue on contemporary issues”.

He was on the Board of Directors of the Banca Popolare di Roma.

He is a member of the Prince Albert II of Monaco Foundation, created in 2006 for environmental preservation.

He never held public office.

== Awards and medals ==
In 2007 he was awarded by ISIDA (Istituto superiore per imprenditori e dirigenti d’Azienda of Palermo) and Banco di Sicilia with a Master Honoris Causa in Management, for having revitalized the cultural and management style of the Sicilian hotels.

In 2008 he was awarded by the Italian Red Cross with the Gold Medal of Merit, for having made significant and frequent charitable donations.

In 2009 the University of Catania bestowed a Degree Honoris Causa to Francesco Bellavista Caltagirone for his management activity in the field of “Governance and Management of Public Administration and Business”.

In 2005 he received the Pigna d’Argento award from Senator Luigi Ramponi for its contribution in promoting Sicily's image abroad.

He received the honors of the Royal House of Savoy.
