= Sergio Noja Noseda =

Italian professor of Arabic language and literature and Sharia

- Sergio Noja Noseda.
- Born: 7 July 1931; Pola, Istria
- Died: 31 January 2008 (aged 76); Lesa, Novara
- Occupations: Professor, essayist, company director
- Spouse(s): Enrica Noja Busnelli, (Milan, …-Milan, 1982) French language professor Adriana Ferni Noseda Noja, interior architect
- Children: Giovanni Giulio Ugo Noja (Milan, 1962 - Milan, 1982)
- Relatives: Ugo Noja (father, pilot officer of the Italian Air Force during the Second World War); Rina Noja Amati (also known as Amabile) (mother, entrepreneur); Sara Pacifici Noja (sister, law professor, married to Giorgio Pacifici); Laura Elena Pacifici Noja (niece), head physician and professor Ugo Giorgio Pacifici Noja (nephew), lawyer and historian.
- Writing career
- Period: 1900
- Genres: Language, Historical, Orientalism

Sergio Noja Noseda (7 July 1931 – 31 January 2008) was an Italian professor of Arabic language and literature and Sharia.

== Life ==
Noja Noseda was born in Pola, the son of Ugo Noja and Rina Noja Amati (also known as Amabile), descending from an ancient family of aristocratic origins coming from Spain in the 16th century which eventually settled in Italy. After High School, he attended the Bocconi University in Milan where he graduated in Economics. During this period he also served as president of the "Società della Taula" (The Bocconi University Senior Society). At the same time as he made a career in a private company, Philips Italia, which would carry him to the rank of director general, he always had a deep interest in oriental studies. He was directed and taught by Monsignor Giovanni Galbiati in the study of the Arabic language. Having been first appointed Professor of Islamic law at the University of Turin, he later became Professor of Arabic language and literature at the Università Cattolica del Sacro Cuore of Milan where he maintained the chair in Arabic language and literature for more than twenty years.

He died in a car accident in 2008, aged 76.

== Bibliography ==
- Breve storia dei popoli arabi. Milano: A. Mondadori, 1997. 292 p.
- Storia dei popoli dell'Islàm. Milano: A. Mondadori.
- L'islàm dell'immobilismo: dalla caduta di Bagdàd allo sbarco di Napoleone in Egitto, 1258-1798. Milano: A. Mondadori, 1994. 356 p.
- L'Islam moderno: dalla conquista napoleonica dell'Egitto al ritiro dell'Armata Rossa dall'Afghanistan. Milano: Mondadori, 1990. 314 p.
