= Caltagirone Editore =

Italian publisher

Caltagirone Editore S.p.A.
- Company type: Public
- Traded as: BIT: CED
- Industry: Publisher
- Founded: 1999; 27 years ago
- Headquarters: Via Barberini, 28 – 00187 Rome, Italy
- Key people: Francesco Gaetano Caltagirone (Main Shareholder)
- Products: Magazines; Newspapers; Television; Web portals Advertising
- Website: caltagironeeditore.com

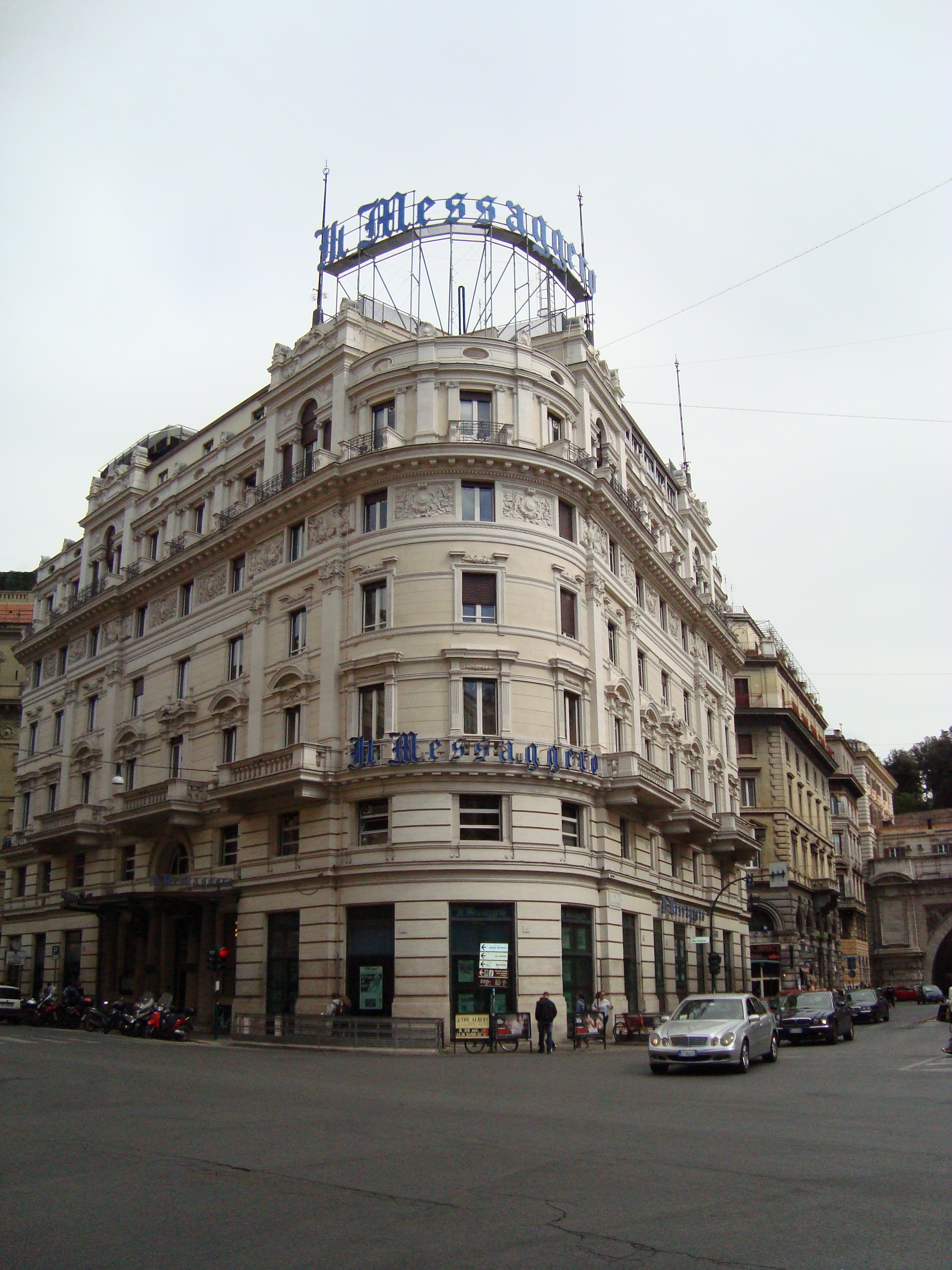
Central editorial office of Il Messaggero in Rome, Via del Tritone, near Piazza Barberini

Caltagirone Editore S.p.A. is an Italian publisher, based in Rome, Italy, founded in July 1999 (following the purchase of the newspapers Il Messaggero and Il Mattino in 1999). Francesco Gaetano Caltagirone is the founder of the company which has been listed on the Italian Stock Exchange since December 2000.

== Shareholding ==
- Francesco Gaetano Caltagirone – 65.590%
  - Francesco Gaetano Caltagirone – 18%
  - Parted 1982 S.p.A. – 35.564%
  - Caltagirone Editore – 0.025%
  - Gamma Immobiliare S.r.l. – 12.001%
- Gaetano Caltagirone (nephew of Francesco Gaetano Caltagirone) – 2.399%
- Edizione Holding – 2.239%

== Overview ==
- Newspapers
  - Il Messaggero
  - Il Mattino
  - Il Gazzettino
  - Leggo
  - Corriere Adriatico
  - Quotidiano di Puglia
- Television
  - TeleFriuli
- Advertising
  - Piemme concessionaria di pubblicità
- Web portal
  - Caltanet.it
