= Asma Hilali =

Religious studies scholar

Asma Hilali is a religious studies and Quranic studies scholar and associate professor of Islamic studies at the University of Lille, France.

== Biography ==
Hilali received her PhD from l’École Pratique des Hautes Études, Paris. She has conducted research at different centers across Germany, France, and the United Kingdom.

== Works ==
- The Sanaa Palimpsest: The Transmission of the Qur’an in the First Centuries AH (2017)
- The Making of Religious Texts in Islam: The Fragment and the Whole (ed.) with S. R. Burge (2017)
