= Giorgio Pacifici =

Italian sociologist (1939–2025)

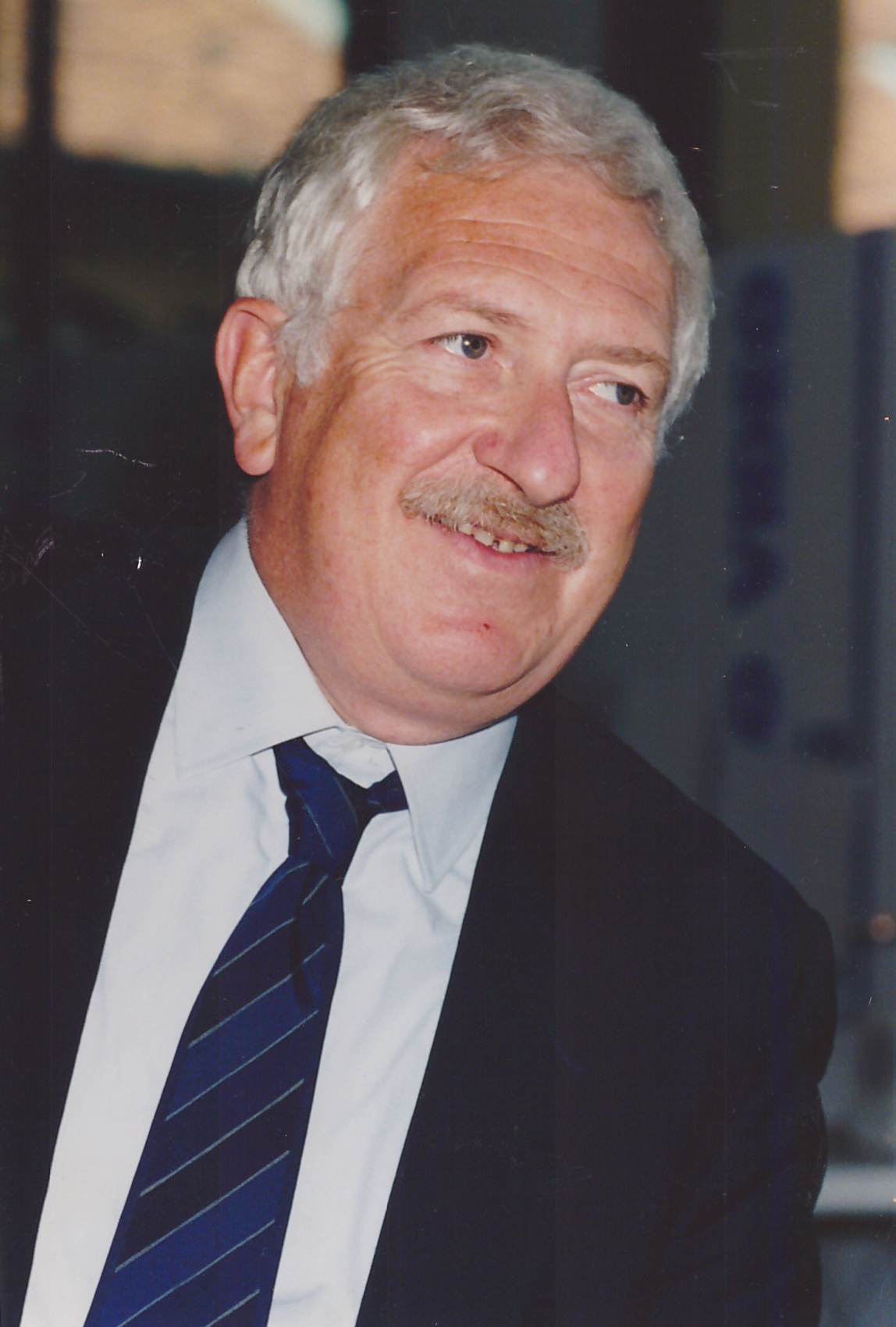
- Born: 24 July 1939; Milan, Italy
- Died: 22 August 2025 (aged 86)
- Occupations: Professor; essayist; company director
- Spouse: Sara Pacifici Noja
- Children: Laura Elena Pacifici Noja, Ugo Giorgio Pacifici Noja
- Parent(s): Benvenuto Pacifici, Laura Pacifici Contini
- Relatives: Sergio Noja Noseda

Giorgio Pacifici (24 July 1939 – 22 August 2025) was an Italian sociologist.

== Life and career ==
Giorgio Pacifici studied under professor Carlo Giglio in Italy and Pierre Marthelot in France, and was professor at the IEP-Institut d'Études Politiques in Paris. He is president of the Forum for the technology of the Information Forum per la Tecnologia dell'Informazione.

His The cost of Democracy of 1983 (in Italian Il costo della democrazia) represents the opening of the strand of work on the public fundings of the Italian political parties.

As a sociologist, Giorgio Pacifici's main interest is represented by the phenomena of change and transformation of the society which are always the unifying factors of his sociological work.

His methodology is interdisciplinary, and this is the reason why he normally calls on and cooperates with him academics coming from different countries who are specialists in subjects different from sociology. Giorgio Pacifici has moreover directed researches and taught in different countries in Europe, Asia and Latin America.

Pacifici later developed a specific interest for the Indian subcontinent, and the problems related to changes in values and anti-values in Indian society. Two books on the argument were directed from him as editor. In his last years he developed research and analysis about the society and economic models of many countries of Asia like India and Nepal. He was the editor for the first time in Italy of a Sociology of the Evil (in Italian Le maschere del male. Una sociologia).

Pacifici died on 22 August 2025, at the age of 86.

== Books (selection) ==
- Political leadership of the party's structures in the kurdish national movement /Milan: I/COM International, [1984]
- Hayduk 1862-1912; graphic project of Herman Vahramian /Milan: I/COM International, with the contribution of Shavasp Tomassian Cultural Fund, [1984]
- The cost of democracy: the italian political parties through their financial statements / Giorgio Pacifici; foreword of it: Gerardo Bianco Roma: Cadmo, [1983]
- The present future: communication, technology and work in a changing society / Giorgio Pacifici, Roberto Giua, Valerio Marchi; foreword of Giuseppe De Vergottini. Milano: Angeli, [1985]
- the italian political party / curated by Giorgio Pacifici; Roma: ARCO, [1989]
- Italian fashion: international big business and the phenomenon of mass culture/ Paris Institute des etudes politiques, [1998-99]
- Teleworking manual for the medium and small enterprises / by Giorgio Pacifici and Teresa Nastasi; in cooperation with Telecom Italia Milano: F. Angeli, [1999]
- The electronic money and Italy: third observatory / by Giorgio Pacifici and Vito Catania; in cooperation with TSP spa, Technologies and services with the public Milano: F. Angeli, [1999]
- Bologna: a digital town / curated by Giorgio Pacifici, Pieraugusto Pozzi and Alessandro Rovinetti; in cooperation with the Italian association of public and institutional communication; with the contribution of BNL multiservizi. Milano: F. Angeli, [1999]
- The Polis Internet / with Paul Mathias, Pieraugusto Pozzi, Giuseppe Sacco, foreword of Francesco De Domenico; in cooperation with Institut d’Etudes Politiques of Paris. Milano: F. Angeli, [2000], translation from French into Italian by Ugo G. Pacifici Noja
- The smart card for the e-society: Fourth Observatory / curated by Giorgio Pacifici; foreword of Marco Martini; in partnership with con SSB group. Milano: F. Angeli, [2002]
- Slaves and free people in the gaily colored empire / with Paolo Girardi in Mediating the human body. Technology, communication and fashion/ edited by Leopoldina Fortunati, J.E.Katz, R. Riccini, London-Mahwah (USA), [2003]
- The future coming from far: from the Cinquecento car to internet without losing the roots / Giorgio Pacifici and Gian Stefano Spoto. Milano: F. Angeli, [2003]
- The silent revolution. Women, ICT, Innovation / curated by Giorgio Pacifici and Serena Dinelli, Roma: CNEL, [2004]
- Money-on-line.eu: digital payment systems and smart cards / edited by Giorgio Pacifici and Pieraugusto Pozzi; introduction by Gian Bruno Mazzi; in partnership with SSB group. Milano: F. Angeli, [2004]
- The smart cards, electronic of payment and the web: fifth Observatory /curated by Giorgio Pacifici; foreword by Gian Bruno Mazzi; in partnership with the SSB group. Milano: F. Angeli, [2004]
- Reinventing governance through ICT and public communication: first European report on eGovernance and public communication / Giorgio Pacifici, Pieraugusto Pozzi, Alessandro Rovinetti; introduced by Josep Borrell Fontelles and Luigi Nicolais; with the high patronage of the European parliament. Milano: F. Angeli, [2006]
- Money-on-line.eu 2006: European scenario of digital payment systems and smart cards / edited by Giorgio Pacifici and Pieraugusto Pozzi; introduction by Gian Bruno Mazzi; in partnership with SSB group. Milano: F. Angeli, [2006]
- Money-on-line.eu 2007: the future of digital payment systems/ edited by Giorgio Pacifici and Pieraugusto Pozzi; introduction by Carlo Tresold; in partnership with SIA-SSB. Milano: F. Angeli, [2007]
- eGovernance and Public Communication for an inclusive eSociety: second European Observatory on eGovernance and Public Communication / edited by Giorgio Pacifici, Pieraugusto Pozzi [et al.]; introduced by Luigi Nicolais. Milano: F. Angeli, [2008]
- The seven lives town: New Delhi / curated by Giorgio Pacifici and Ugo G. Pacifici Noja (foreword by Emmanuele Emanuele); contributions by Anita Andley, Francesca Aragone, Antonia Grande, Sunita Kaistha, Laura Elena Pacifici, Christine Pemberton e Amita Sahaya: Fontana di Trevi Edizioni, [2013]
- "A sociology of the evil", with a foreword by it:Furio Colombo and with contributions by: Michael Blain, Laura Dryjanska, Ugo G. Pacifici Noja and Alexandre Aidara, Vittorio Pavoncello, Pieraugusto Pozzi, Adriano Purgato, Milano: Franco Angeli, [2015].
- “Italie. Sociologia del plurale” by Giorgio Pacifici and Renato Mannheimer, Jaca Book, [2018]
- “Europe. Sociologia di un plurale necessario” by Giorgio Pacifici and Renato Mannheimer, Jaca Book, [2019]
