= Italian Military Centre for Strategic Studies =

The Italian Military Centre for Strategic Studies (Centro Militare Studi Strategici - Ce.Mi.S.S.) is a military think-tank responsible for joint-services research in fields such as:

- international relations;
- military sociology;
- Science and Technology.

It is located in Palazzo Salviati, in Rome (Italy) along with two other organizations:

- the Italian Defence Higher Studies Institute (Istituto Alti Studi per la Difesa = I.A.S.D.), and
- the Italian Joint Service Staff Institute (Istituto Superiore di Stato Maggiore Interforze = I.S.S.M.I.)

where the participation of a large number of civil officials and foreign officers gives a significant contribution to the integration between military community and civil society and fosters exchange of professional and international experiences, dialogue, solidarity, cohesion and a common understanding of fundamental values.

Being in a favourable position to observe the international scene, The Italian Military Centre for Strategic Studies constantly updates information on comprehensive subjects, organising and promoting national and international seminars, conferences, lessons and brain storming dealing with issues of strategic interest.

Its most significant works are published.

It provides a link with universities and research institutes to promote and spread military culture and security and defence issues in the academic community.

It develops its research activity in cooperation with foreign research institutes and eminent researchers.

== See also ==
Military of Italy
