= Il Mattino =

Italian daily newspaper

- Front page (national edition), 11 October 2008
- Type: Daily newspaper
- Format: Broadsheet
- Owner: Caltagirone Editore
- Editor: Alessandro Barbano
- Founded: 1892; 134 years ago
- Political alignment: Centre-left politics
- Language: Italian
- Headquarters: Naples, Italy
- ISSN: 1592-3908
- Website: Il Mattino

Il Mattino (English: "The Morning") is an Italian daily newspaper published in Naples, Italy.

== History and profile ==
Il Mattino was first published on 16 March 1892 by the journalists Edoardo Scarfoglio and Matilde Serao. Since 1999, the paper is owned and published by Caltagirone Editore following the purchase of the newspapers Il Messaggero and Il Mattino.

Since 14 September 2018, its headquarters have been located at the Torre Francesco in the city's business center.

Il Mattino had a daily print circulation of 87,777 copies in 2004. Based on the 2008 survey data from Accertamenti Diffusione Stampa, it was the most-read daily newspaper in Campania, and according to Audipress, it was one of the most-read papers in southern Italy with 975,000 readers in 2011. In 2008, the paper had a circulation of 79,573 copies.

== See also ==
- List of newspapers in Italy
