= Il Messaggero =

Italian daily newspaper

- Front page (Rome edition), 3 October 2008
- Type: Daily newspaper
- Format: Broadsheet
- Owner: Caltagirone Editore
- Publisher: Il Messaggero S.p.A.
- Editor: Massimo Martinelli
- Founded: 1878; 148 years ago
- Political alignment: Liberal conservatism Formerly: Fascism (1925–1944); Anti-communism
- Language: Italian
- Headquarters: Rome, Italy
- Country: Kingdom of Italy (1878–1946); Italy (since 1946)
- Circulation: 91,012 (2012)
- Sister newspapers: Corriere Adriatico; Il Mattino
- ISSN: 1126-8352
- Website: www.ilmessaggero.it

Il Messaggero (English: "The Messenger") is an Italian daily newspaper based in Rome, Italy. It has been in circulation since 1878. It is one of the main national newspapers in Italy.

== History and profile ==
Il Messaggero was founded in December 1878. On 1 January 1879, the first issue of Il Messaggero was published, under the management of Luigi Cesana. The paper aimed at being the newspaper of newspapers and at providing its readers with all opinions and all events. The first four copies of the paper were delivered as free samples to the subscribers of the newspaper, Il Fanfulla. One of the early editors-in-chief of Il Messaggero was Alberto Cianca, who resigned from the post due to political reasons.

Since its inception, Il Messaggero has been owned by different companies. One of the former owners is Montedison through the Ferruzzi Group. In 1996 the paper was acquired by Francesco Gaetano Caltagirone. He founded the Caltagirone Editore in 1999. The company is the majority owner of the paper which has its 90%. Its leaders include Azzurra Caltagirone, the partner of the political leader Pierferdinando Casini, on its board. The company also owns Corriere Adriatico and Il Mattino. The publisher of the daily is Il Messaggero S.p.A.

Il Messaggero is published in broadsheet format and is based in Rome. In addition to its national edition the paper has 12 local editions, including those for the regions of Lazio, Umbria, Marche, Abruzzo and Tuscany.

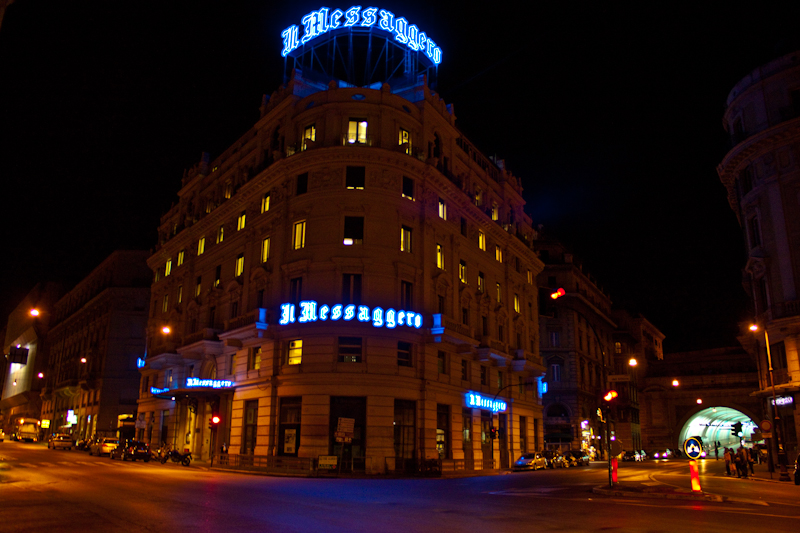
The headquarters of Il Messaggero in Rome

== Circulation ==
The 1988 circulation of Il Messaggero was 370,000 copies. It was the sixth best-selling Italian newspaper in 1997 with a circulation of 256,400 copies. The paper had a circulation of 288,000 copies in 1999.

In 2000 the circulation of the paper was 292,000 copies. Its circulation was 293,000 copies in 2001 and 258,538 copies in 2002. The circulation of the paper was 252,000 copies in 2003 and 240,778 copies in 2004. The paper had a circulation of 230,697 copies in 2005. Its circulation was 216,000 copies in 2007.

In 2012 Il Messaggero sold 91,012,767 copies.

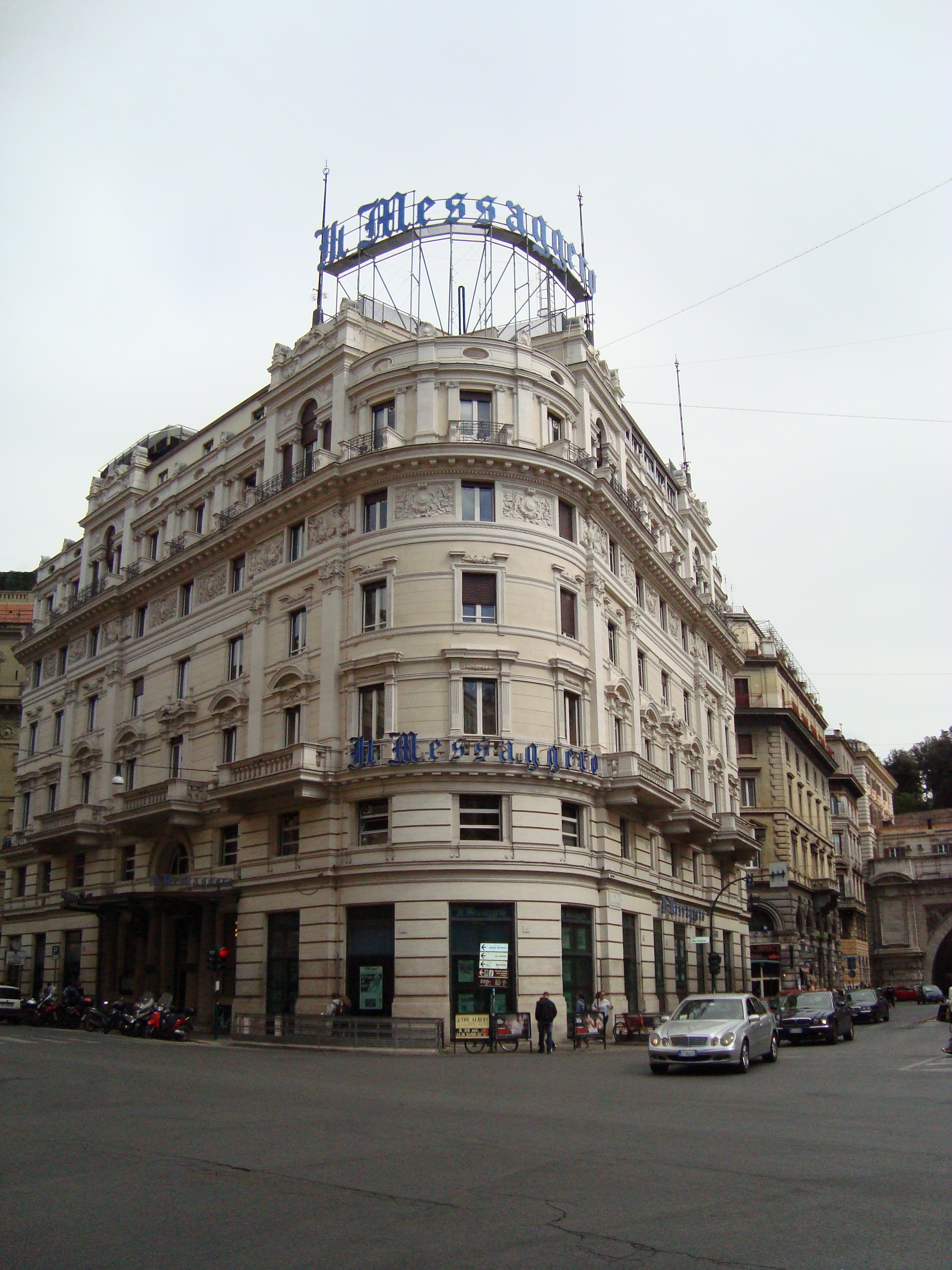
The Messaggero building in via del Tritone

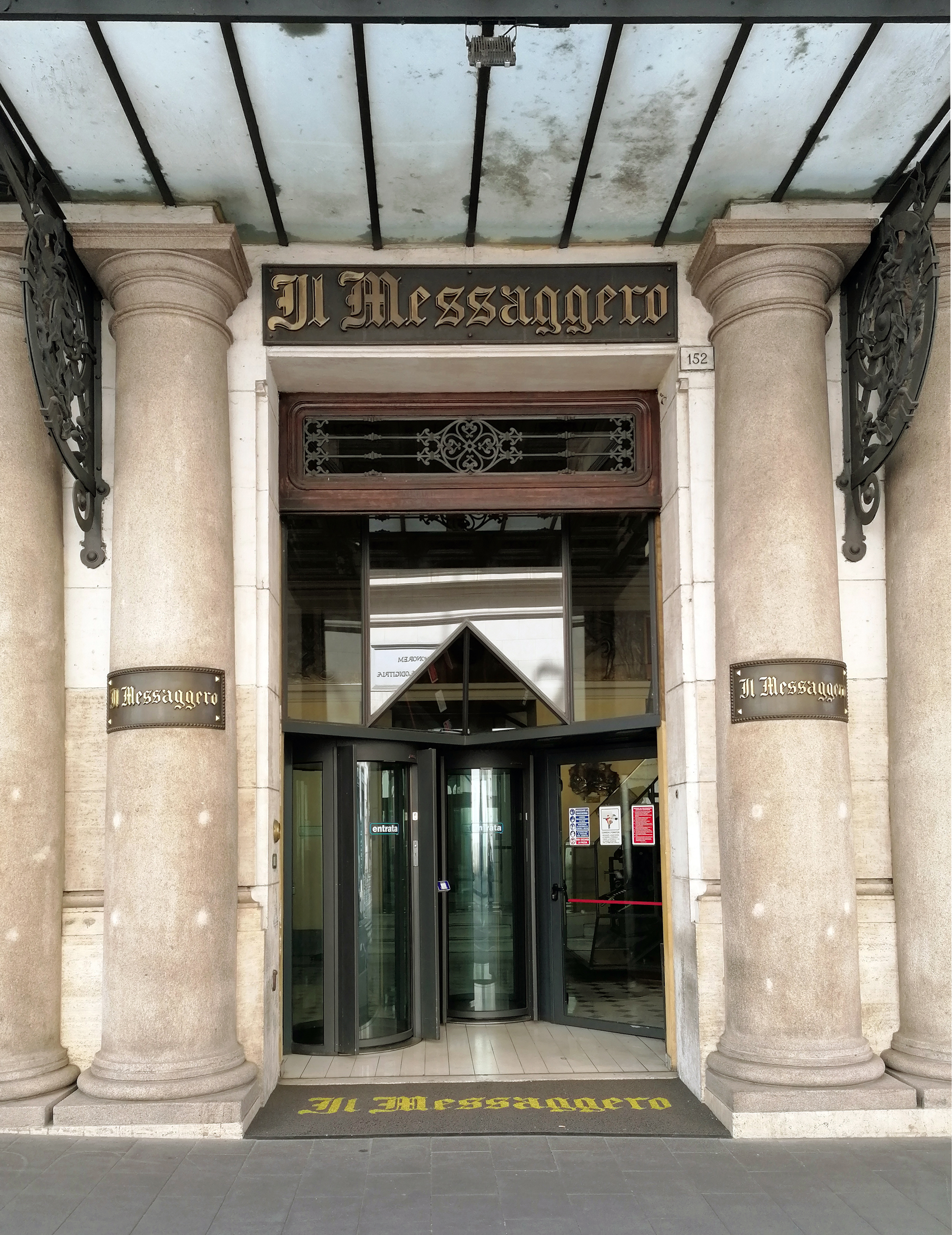
The main entrance, which overlooks Via del Tritone

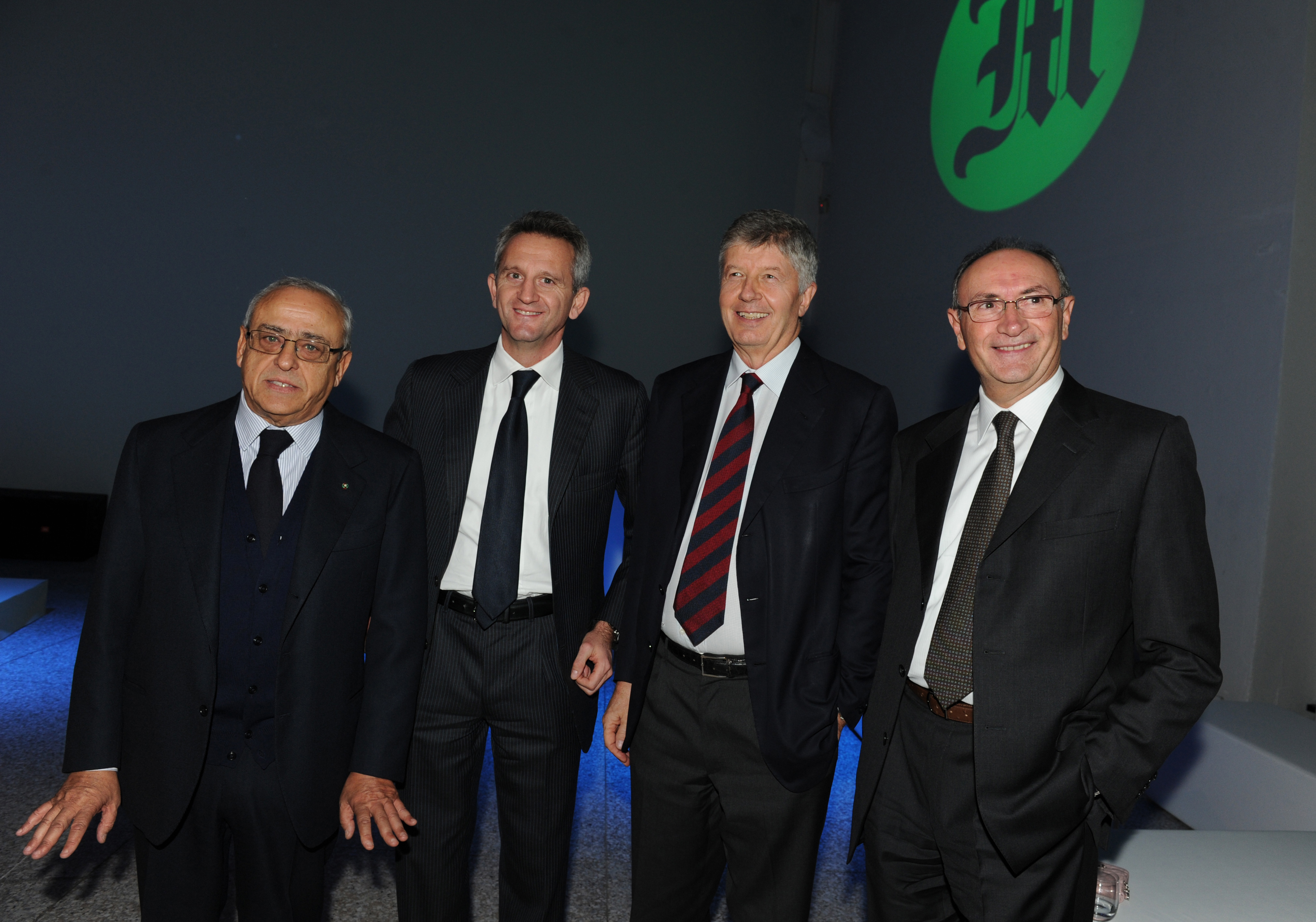
President Francesco Gaetano Caltagirone with Alberto Nagel, Gabriele Galateri and Federico Ghizzoni at the newspaper's "restyling" event

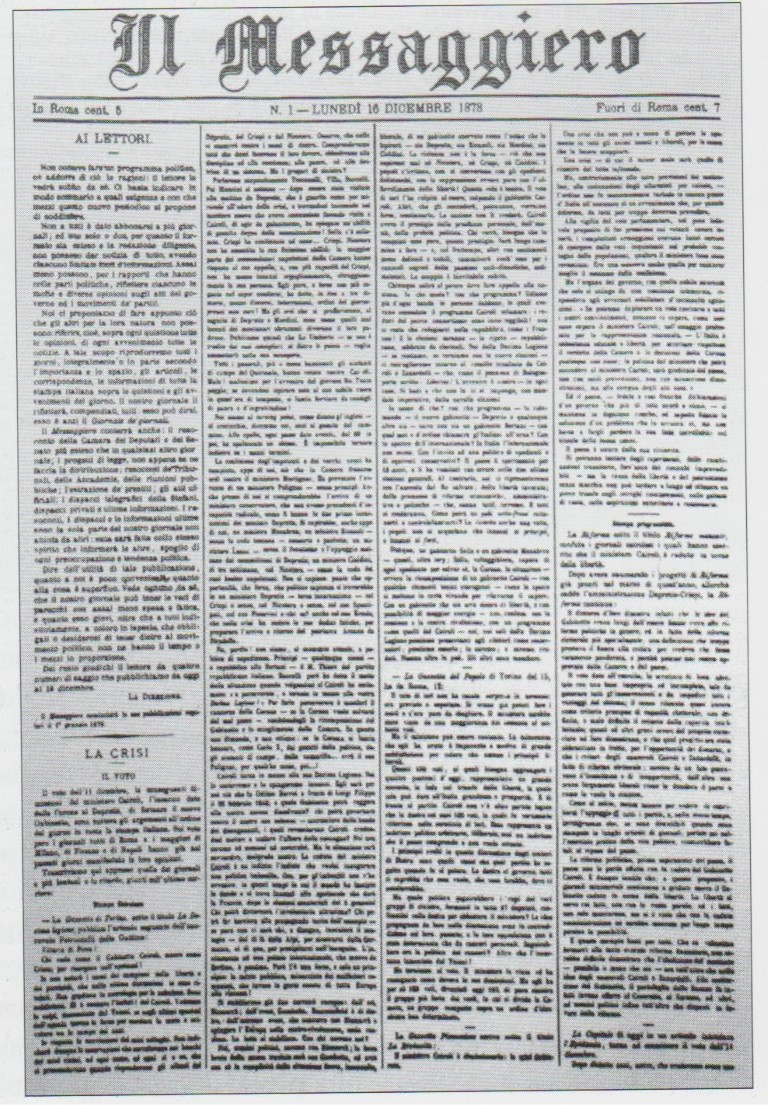
Numero di prova del quotidiano "Il Messaggiero", uscito a Roma il dicembre 16 1878

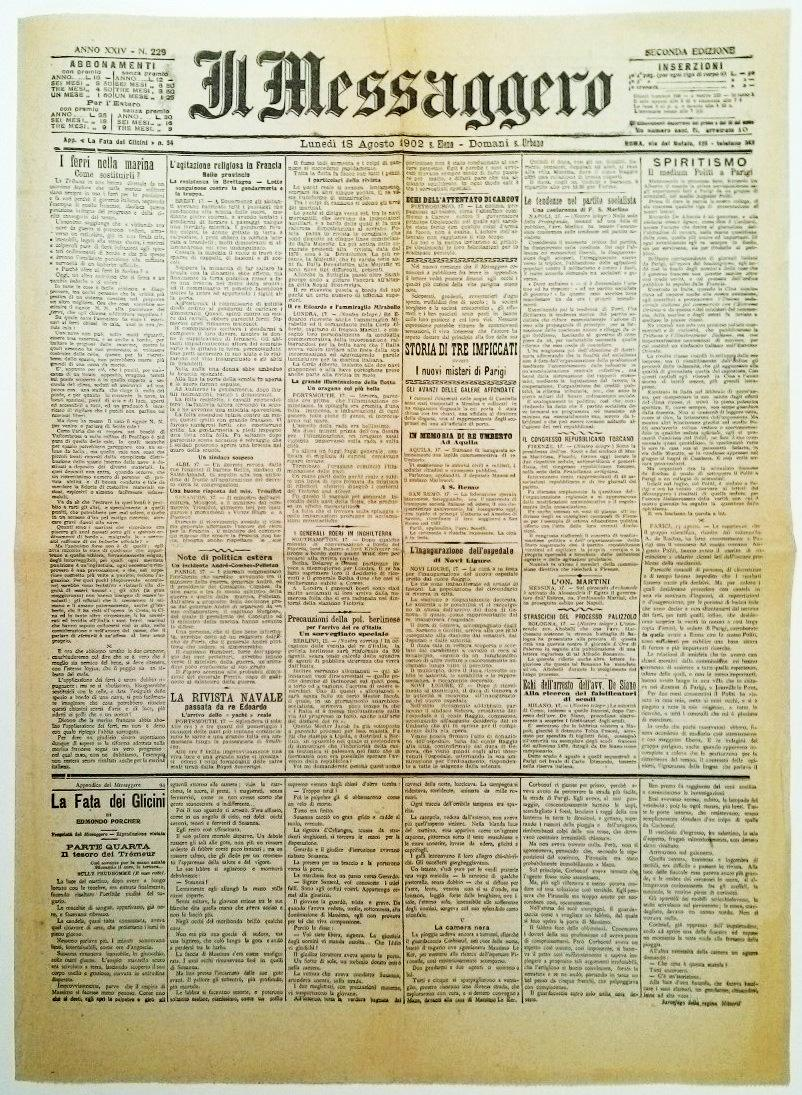
Prima pagina del "Messaggero" del 18 agosto 1902

== See also ==
- List of newspapers in Italy
