= Telefriuli =

Italian regional television channel

- Country: Italy

History
- Launched: 4 February 1978

Links
- Website: www.telefriuli.it

Availability

Terrestrial
- Channel 11, 511 (HD)

Telefriuli (Friulian language Telefriûl) is an Italian regional television channel in Friuli-Venezia Giulia. It broadcasts a variety of shows, including a talk show, Eis Café. The channel is also active in the promotion of Friulian language; it broadcasts a short newsbreak in Friulian, called Lis gnovis, and several other programs about language, music and traditions.

The main Telefriuli offices are located in the northern part of Udine.

TeleFriuli broadcasts a full multiplex on UHF channel 46 and can be received for free on digital terrestrial television channel 11 and 511 in high definition. There is also TeleFriuli+1, which broadcasts the programmes 1 hour later.
