= Cecchi =

Cecchi (pronounced [ˈtʃekki]) is an Italian surname derived from the given name Cecco. Notable people with the surname include:

- Alberto Cecchi (born 1943), Italian rower
- Alessandro Cecchi Paone (born 1961), Italian television presenter, journalist, radio and television writer, and politician
- Andrea Cecchi (born 1968), Italian swimmer
- Anna Maria Cecchi (1943–2021), Italian swimmer
- Carlo Cecchi (1939–2026), Italian actor and theater director
- Claire C. Cecchi (born 1964), American judge
- Dario Cecchi (1918–1992), Italian art director and costume designer
- Emilio Cecchi (1884–1966), Italian literary critic, art critic and screenwriter
- Ezio Cecchi (1913–1984), Italian cyclist
- Gabriella Cecchi (born 1944), Italian pianist, music educator and composer
- Gabriello Cecchi (1943–2000), Italian entrepreneur
- Giovanni Battista Cecchi (1748/49 – after 1815), Italian engraver
- Giovanni Maria Cecchi (1518–1587), Italian poet, playwright, writer and notary
- Leonardo Cecchi (born 1998), Italian actor
- Leonetta Cecchi Pieraccini (1882–1977), Italian painter
- Mario Cecchi Gori (1920–1993), Italian film producer
- Rita Cecchi Gori (née Rusić; born 1960), Croatian film producer, actress and singer
- Stefano Cecchi (born 1971), Italian record producer and entrepreneur
- Suso Cecchi d'Amico (1914–2000), Italian screenwriter and actress
- Vittorio Cecchi Gori (born 1942), Italian film producer and politician

== See also ==
- Ignacio Cechi (born 2001), Argentine footballer
- Cecchin
- Cecchini
- Checchi
- Chechi (disambiguation)
