= List of Croatian composers =

This is a list of Croatian composers.

- Srećko Albini (1869-1933)
- Luna Alcalay (1928-2012)
- Andrea Antico (Andrija Motovunjanin)(c. 1480–1538)
- Krešimir Baranović (1894–1975)
- Petar Bergamo (1930-2022)
- Blagoje Bersa (1873–1934)
- Rudolf Brucci (1917–2002)
- Bruno Bjelinski (1909–1992)
- Ivan Božičević (born 1961)
- Ivan Brkanović (1906-1987)
- Tomaso Cecchino (1583-1644) (Italian composer active in Croatia)
- Luigi Dallapiccola (1904-1975)
- Arsen Dedić (1938–2015)
- Pavle Dešpalj (1934-2021)
- Dubravko Detoni (born 1937)
- Jakov Gotovac (1895–1982)
- Darko Hajsek (born 1959)
- Josip Hatze (1879–1959)
- Žiga Hirschler (1894–1941)
- Stanko Horvat (1930–2006), 20th-century composer
- Ivan Mane Jarnović (1747–1804)
- Vinko Jelic (1596-1636)
- Đelo Jusić (1939–2019)
- Alfi Kabiljo (1935–2025)
- Milko Kelemen (1924–2018), contemporary composer
- Ivana Kiš (born 1979)
- Ante Knešaurek (born 1978)
- Franjo Krežma (1862–1881)
- Franjo Kuhač (1834-1911)
- Igor Kuljerić (1938–2006)
- Ivana Lang (1912–1982), composer, pianist and piano teacher.
- Ivo Lhotka-Kalinski (1913-1987)
- Vatroslav Lisinski (1819–1854), 19th-century composer and co–founder of "Illyrian Movement"
- Ferdo Livadić (1799–1879)
- Nada Ludvig-Pečar (1929–2008)
- Ivan Lukačić (1587–1648), renaissance composer
- Ivo Malec (1925-2019)
- Ivan Matetić Ronjgov (1880–1960)
- Josip Mandić (1883–1959)
- Lovro von Matačić (1899-1985)
- Rudolf Matz (1901-1988)
- Branko Mihaljević (1931-2005)
- Ivan Padovec (1800-1873)
- Vlaho Paljetak (1893-1944)
- Boris Papandopulo (1914–1986), 20th-century composer
- Dora Pejačević (1885–1923), late–romantic composer
- Dragan Plamenac (1895–1983)
- Miljenko Prohaska (1925-2014)
- Elena Pucić-Sorkočević (1786–1865)
- Ruben Radica (1931-2021)
- Vjekoslav Rosenberg-Ružić (1870–1954)
- Marko Rothmüller (1908–1993)
- Josif Runjanin (1821–1878)
- Ferdo Rusan (1810-1879)
- Milan Sachs (1884–1968)
- Berislav Šipuš (born 1958)
- Antun Sorkočević (1775–1841)
- Luka Sorkočević (1734–1789)
- Josip Štolcer-Slavenski (1896–1955)
- Stjepan Šulek (1914–1986), 20th-century composer
- Franz von Suppé (1819–1895)
- Ivo Tijardović (1895–1976)
- Juro Tkalčić (1877-1957)
- Marko Tomasović (born 1976), 21st-century composer
- Marcel Tyberg (1893–1944), composer who lived in Abbazia (formerly in Italy), now called Opatija, Croatia
- Albe Vidaković (1914–1964)
- Ivan Zajc (1832–1914)
- Živko Ključe (born 1955)
