= Gabriello =

Gabriello is a surname and a given name. Notable people with the name include:

Surname:

- André Gabriello (1896–1975), French film actor
- Suzanne Gabriello (1932–1992), aka Zizou, French singer and actress

Given name:

- Gabriello Carnazza (1871–1931), Italian lawyer and politician
- Gabriello Carotti (born 1960), Italian former footballer
- Gabriello Cecchi (1914–2000), Italian entrepreneur in the gelato industry
- Gabriello Chiabrera (1552–1638), Italian poet
- Gabriello Ferrantini, Italian painter of the Baroque period
- Angelo Gabriello Piò (1690–1770), Italian sculptor
