= Chicco (name) =

Chicco (pronounced [ˈkikko]) is a diminutive of the Italian masculine given name Francesco, also occurring as a surname. Notable people with the name include:

== Given name ==
- Chicco Testa (born 1952), Italian politician
- Chicco Jerikho (born 1984), Indonesian actor and film producer
- Sello Chicco Twala (born 1963), South African singer and record producer
- Tyrell Johannes Chicco Malacia (born 1999), Dutch footballer

== Surname ==
- Adriano Chicco (1907–1990), Italian chess composer
- Davide Chicco (born 1973), Italian mountain runner
- Francesco Chicco (active 1930s), Italian rower
- Ignacio Chicco (born 1996), Argentine footballer
- Julián Chicco (born 1998), Argentine footballer, brother of Ignacio

== See also ==
- Cecchi
- Cecco
- Checchi
- Checco
- Chico (disambiguation)
