= Cecchino =

Cecchino (pronounced [tʃekˈkiːno]) is a diminutive of the Italian masculine given name Cecco (in turn a diminutive of Francesco) and a surname. Notable people with the name include:

- Cecchino dei Bracci (1528–1544), a pupil of Michelangelo
- Cecchino del Salviati (1510–1563), Italian painter
- Tomaso Cecchino (c. 1580–1644), Italian composer

== See also ==
- Il cecchino, 2012 film by Michele Placido
- Cecchin
- Cecchini
