= Cecchini =

Cecchini (pronounced [tʃekˈkiːni]) is an Italian surname from Umbria, derived from the male given name Cecco (a diminutive of Francesco). Notable people with the surname include:

- Antonio Cecchini (1660–17??), Italian painter of the Baroque period
- Arvedo Cecchini (1924–2011), Italian wrestler
- Dario Cecchini (born 1955), Italian butcher
- Dave Cecchini, American college football player and coach
- Elena Cecchini (born 1992), Italian racing cyclist
- Eleonora Cecchini (born 2003), Sammarinese footballer
- Emanuel Cecchini (born 1996), Argentine footballer
- Garin Cecchini (born 1991), American baseball player in Major League Baseball, brother of Gavin Cecchini
- Gavin Cecchini (born 1993), American baseball player, brother of Garin Cecchini
- Graziano Cecchini (born 1953), Italian artist and activist
- Jessica Cecchini (born 1990), Italian beauty pageant winner
- José Antonio Cecchini (born 1955), retired Spanish wrestler
- Joseph Luke Cecchini (born 1982), Italian skeleton racer
- Libero Cecchini (1919–2020), Italian architect
- Loris Cecchini (born 1969), Italian contemporary artist
- Luca Cecchini (born 1993), Italian footballer
- Luigi Cecchini (born 1944), Italian sports doctor
- Mario Cecchini (1933–2021), Italian Roman Catholic bishop
- Mario Cecchini (businessman), Canadian media and sports executive
- Michele Cecchini (1920–1989), Italian diplomat for the Vatican
- Ramon Cecchini (born 1990), Swiss footballer
- Russell Cecchini, Canadian paralympic athlete
- Sandra Cecchini (born 1965), Italian tennis player
- Tom Cecchini (born 1944), American football player and coach

== See also ==
- 13798 Cecchini, an asteroid
- Cecchin
- Cecchino
