= Keats–Shelley Memorial House =

Art museum, historic site in Rome, Italy

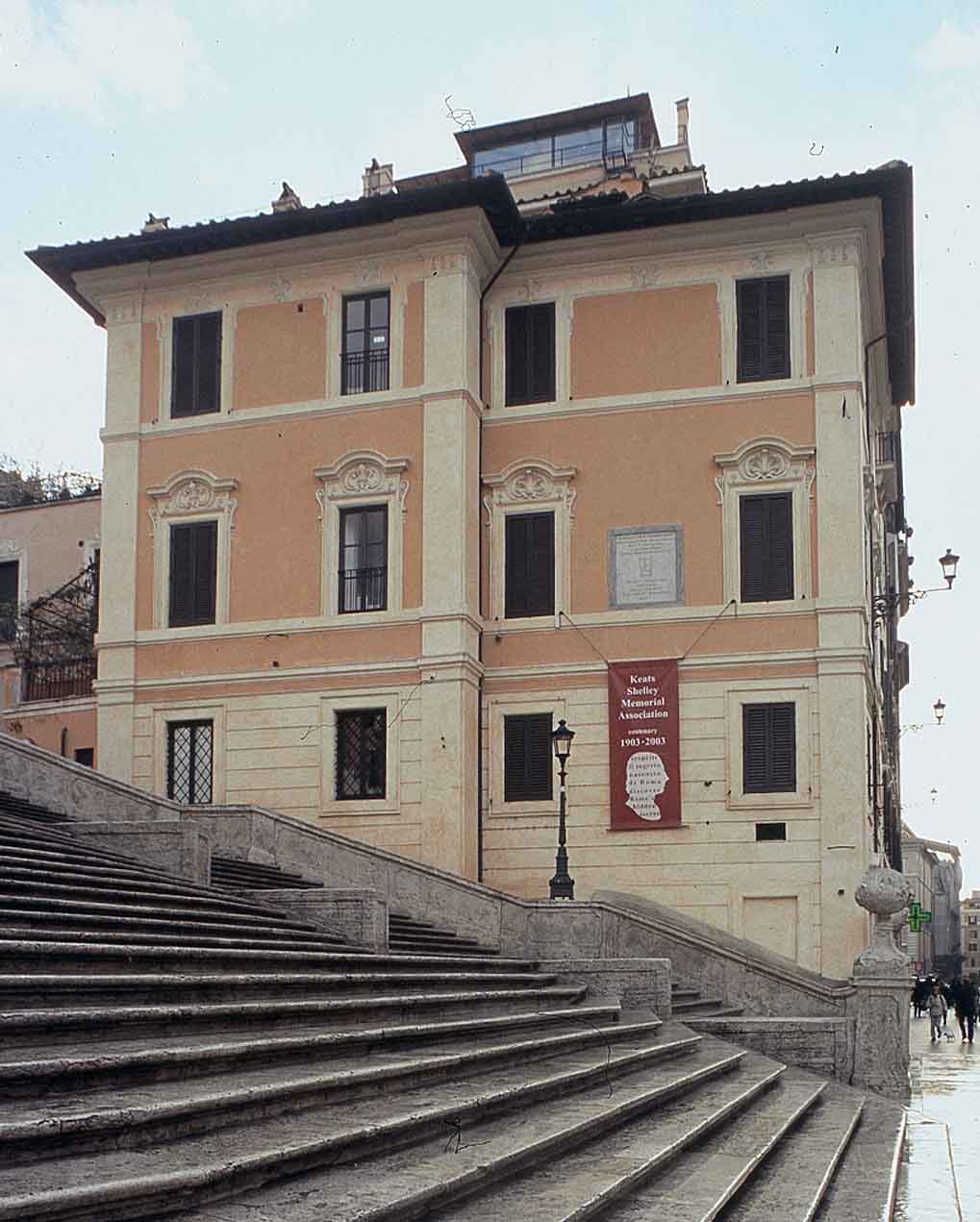
- The Keats–Shelley House in Rome
- Click on the map for a fullscreen view
- Established: 1909
- Location: Piazza di Spagna, 26 00186 Rome, Italy
- Coordinates: 41°54′20.72″N 12°28′57.41″E
- Type: Art museum, Historic site
- Website: www.keats-shelley-house.org

The Keats–Shelley Memorial House is a writer's house museum in Rome, Italy, commemorating the Romantic poets John Keats and Percy Bysshe Shelley. The museum houses one of the world's most extensive collections of memorabilia, letters, manuscripts, and paintings relating to Keats and Shelley, as well as Byron, Wordsworth, Robert Browning, Elizabeth Barrett Browning, Oscar Wilde, and others. It is located on the second floor of the building situated just to the south of the base of the Spanish Steps and east of the Piazza di Spagna.

== History ==
In November 1820, the English poet John Keats, who was dying of tuberculosis, came to Rome at the urging of friends and doctors who hoped that the warmer climate might improve his health. He was accompanied by an acquaintance, the artist Joseph Severn, who nursed and looked after Keats until his death at age twenty-five on 23 February 1821, in this house. The walls were initially scraped and all things remaining in the room immediately burned (in accordance with the health laws of 19th century Rome) following the poet's death.

The effort to purchase and restore the two-room apartment in which Keats spent his final days began in 1903 at the instigation of the American poet Robert Underwood Johnson. Assisted by interested parties representing the U.S., England, and Italy, the house was purchased late in 1906 and dedicated in April 1909 for use by the Keats–Shelley Memorial Association. The rooms then became known as the Keats–Shelley House.

During World War II, the Keats–Shelley House went "underground", especially after 1943, in order to preserve its invaluable contents from falling into the hands of, and most likely being deliberately destroyed by, Nazi Germany. External markings relating to the museum were removed from the building. Although the library's 10,000 volumes were not removed, two boxes of artifacts were sent to the Abbey of Monte Cassino in December 1942 for safekeeping. In October 1943, the abbey's archivist placed the two unlabelled boxes of Keats–Shelley memorabilia with his personal possessions so that they could be removed during the abbey's evacuation and not fall into the hands of the Germans. The items were reclaimed by the museum's curator and returned to the Keats–Shelley House, where the boxes were reopened in June 1944 upon the arrival of the Allied forces in Rome.

== Architecture ==
The building at Piazza di Spagna 26 was remodelled as part of the project to build the Spanish Steps in 1724–25. The project was designed by Francesco de Sanctis, who wanted to frame the steps with an identical building on either side.

== See also ==
- Keats House, London, England
- Shelley Memorial, Oxford, England

Preceded by Jewish Museum of Rome	Landmarks of Rome; Keats–Shelley Memorial House	Succeeded by MAXXI
