= Cecchin =

Cecchin (Italian: [tʃekˈkin], Venetian: [tʃeˈkiŋ]) is an Italian surname from Veneto, derived from the given name Cecco. Notable people with the surname include:

- Alberto Cecchin (born 1989), Italian cyclist
- Fiorina Cecchin (1877–1925), Italian Catholic nun
- Matt Cecchin (born 1973), Australian rugby league referee

== See also ==
- Cecchi
- Cecchino
- Cecchini
- Checchin
