= Sarrocchi =

Sarrocchi is a surname of Italian origin. Notable people with the surname include:

- Gino Sarrocchi (1870–1950), Italian lawyer and politician
- Giulio Sarrocchi (1887–1971), Italian fencer
- Margherita Sarrocchi (c. 1560–1617), Italian poet
- Tito Sarrocchi (1824–1900), Italian sculptor
