= Checchin =

Checchin (Italian: [kekˈkin], Venetian: [keˈkiŋ]) is an Italian surname from Veneto, derived from the given name Checco. Notable people with the surname include:

- Luca Checchin (born 1997), Italian footballer
- Stefano Checchin (born 1967), Italian road cyclist

== See also ==
- Checchi
- Cecchin
