= Chechi =

Chechi may refer to:

- Chechi (film), a 1950 Indian Malayalam-language film
- Chechi, Attock, a village in Pakistan
- Chechi clan, of the Gurjar people in India
- Jury Chechi (born 1969), Italian gymnast

== See also ==
- Cecchi, an Italian surname
- Checchi, an Italian surname
- Chachi (disambiguation)
- Chhachi (Pashtun tribe)
