= Pietro Nardini =

Italian composer (1722–1793)

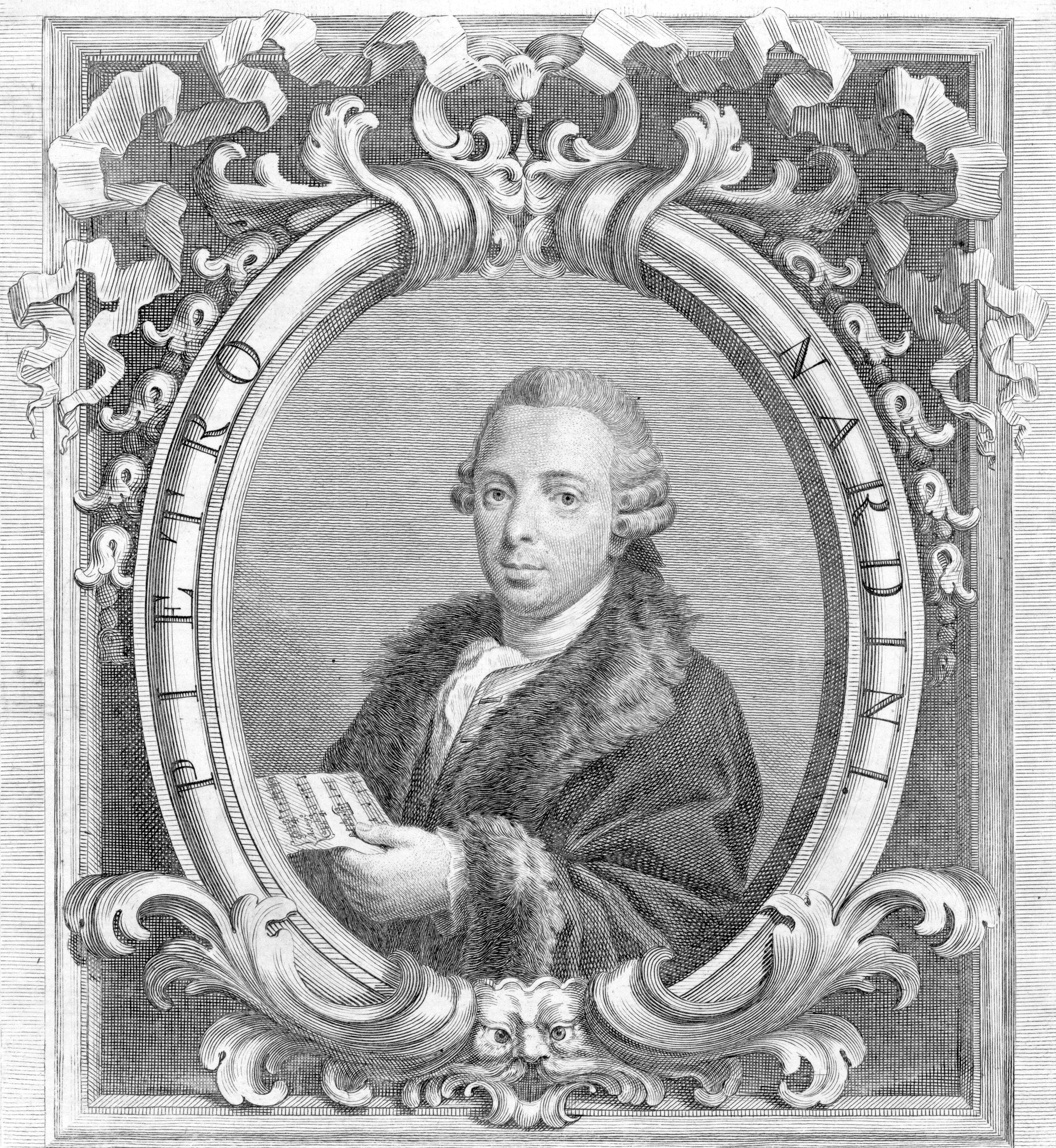
Pietro Nardini, engraving attributed to Giovanni Battista Cecchi

Pietro Nardini (12 April 1722 – 7 May 1793) was an Italian composer and violinist, a transitional musician who worked in both the Baroque and Classical era traditions.

== Life ==
Nardini was born in Livorno and at the age of 12, he became a pupil of Giuseppe Tartini in Padua. In 1740, he moved to Lucca. He was invited to the court of Maria Theresa in Vienna more than once. In 1762, he moved to Stuttgart, where he joined the court of Charles Eugene, Duke of Württemberg and performed at his summer residence Ludwigsburg Palace. He was appointed conductor, succeeding Niccolò Jommelli.

In 1765, he traveled to the courts of Charles I, Duke of Brunswick-Wolfenbüttel and Prince Francis Xavier of Saxony. In 1770, he moved back to Italy to assist the suffering Tartini. The next year, he became Kapellmeister, succeeding Carlo Antonio Campioni in Florence. The rest of his life, he stayed at the court of Leopold II, Grand Duke of Tuscany, but performed in Naples, Pisa and Rome.

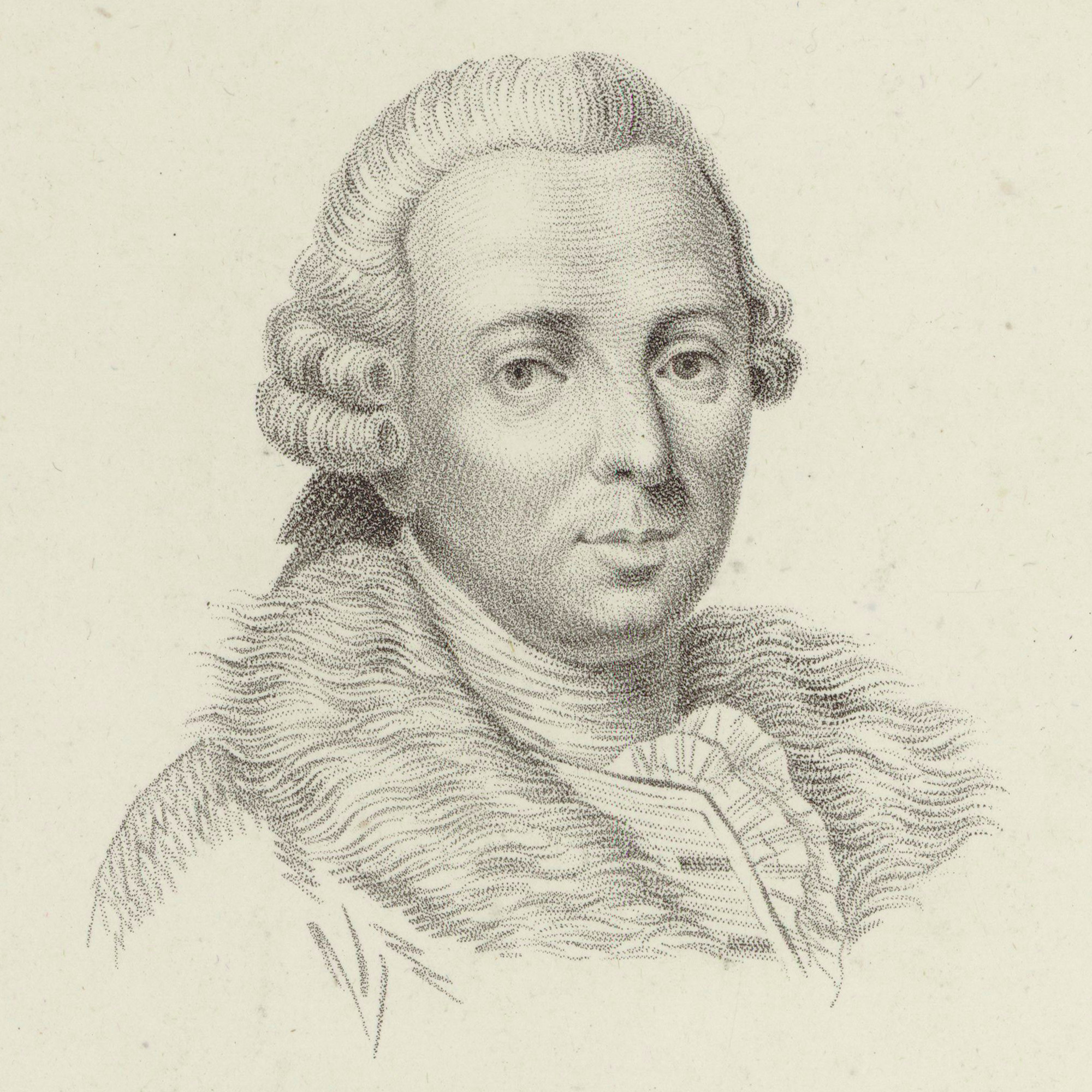
Pietro Nardini

As a friend of Leopold Mozart, he witnessed the arrival of Wolfgang Amadeus Mozart on his first visit to Italy and his attempts to find a sustainable position in 1770–1771. He also met the Bohemian composer Václav Pichl, Kapellmeister to Ferdinand Karl, Archduke of Austria-Este, governor of Lombardy. In 1778, he was invited by Catherine the Great.

Nardini is mentioned in English writer Hester Lynch Piozzi's Observations and Reflections Made in the Course of a Journey Through France, Italy, and Germany (1789) as playing a solo at a concert Mrs Piozzi and her husband, Gabriele Piozzi, gave in Florence in July 1785.

Though Nardini was not a prolific composer, his works are known for their sentimental but melodious tunes and usefulness in technical studies. Among the best known are the Sonata in D major and the Concerto in E minor.

He was a teacher to many students: Bartolomeo Campagnoli, Filippo Manfredi, Thomas Linley the younger, Giovanni Francesco Giuliani and perhaps Giuseppe Cambini and Gaetano Brunetti. Nardini died in Florence on 7 May 1793, aged 71.

== Works ==
Vocal Music

Operas (Intermezzi), Oratorios, Cantatas, Sacred vocal music, Masses, Motets, Psalms, Antiphons, Arias, Songs

Instrumental music

Violin Concertos, Keyboard Concertos, Violin Sonatas, Duos, String Trios, String Quartets, Chamber Music, Symphonies and other Orchestral Works

== Recordings ==
- Overtures and Flute Concertos, Auser Musici, Carlo Ipata, director, Agorà Musica AG 157.1 (2002)

Nardini's Concerto per Violino in mi minore (Violin Concerto in E minor), was recorded by Pinchas Zukerman, violin, and members of the Los Angeles Philharmonic, on CBS Masterworks, in the 1970s, now available in "Vivaldi, Nardini & Viotti: Italian Violin Concertos", ETERNA 2009.

A Concerto for Violin in F major, Op. 1, No. 3 was performed on a Stradivarius violin by Andrea Cappelletti with the European Community Chamber Orchestra in 1992. The recording was released in 1998 on Koch Schwann Musica Mundi 3-8711-2 under the title, Tribute to Stradivarius: Virtuoso Violin Concertos.

A Violin Concerto in E minor performed by Mischa Elman and the Chamber Orchestra of the Vienna State Opera, Vladimir Golschmann conducting, was digitally remastered and appeared in 1993 on Vanguard Classics OVC 8033 as part of The Mischa Elman Collection.

Four violin concertos (in C major, G major, D major, and A major) were recorded in 2001, featuring Mauro Rossi as performer and conductor, on Dynamic CDS392.

His Six String Quartets are performed by Quartetto Eleusi on Brilliant Classics.

The ensemble Ardi Cor Mio performed four violin sonatas from manuscripts in various European museums and recorded them in 2007 on Tactus TC 721401.

Henryk Szeryng plays Nardini, Vieuxtemps, Ravel & Schumann. Violin Concerto in E minor. SWR Sinfonieorchester, Hans Rosbaud.

Ensemble Alraune recorded the duets for two violas on NovAntiqua Records.

The Austrian Eduard Melkus recorded the Violin Concerto in E-flat major with the Capella Academica, Vienna, conducted by August Wenzinger on Archiv Produktion 198370 in February 1966.
