= Checchi =

Checchi (pronounced [ˈkekki]) is an Italian surname derived from the given name Checco. Notable people with the surname include:

- Al Checchi (born 1948), American businessman
- Andrea Checchi (1916–1974), Italian actor
- Arturo Checchi (1886–1971), Italian artist
- Cristiana Checchi (born 1977), Italian shot putter
- Lorenzo Checchi (born 1991), Italian footballer
- Robert Checchi (1926–1993), American set decorator
- Valerio Checchi (born 1980), Italian cross-country skier

== See also ==
- Chechi (disambiguation)
- Cecchi
- Checchin
