= Giovanni Battista Cecchi =

Giovanni Battista Cecchi (1748/9 – after 1815) was an Italian engraver, active in a neoclassical style in his native Florence, Region of Tuscany, Italy.

== Biography ==
Initially trained as a carpenter, an injury to his dominant right hand prompted apprenticing under Francesco Conti, and subsequently became a follower of the engraver Ferdinando Gregori. He initially dedicated himself to printed copies of major paintings, for example, a reproduction (1767) of the Madonna and Child by Annibale Carracci (On display at Istituto nazionale per la grafica) and a copy (1768) of the Mystical Marriage of St Catherine by Francesco Vanni.

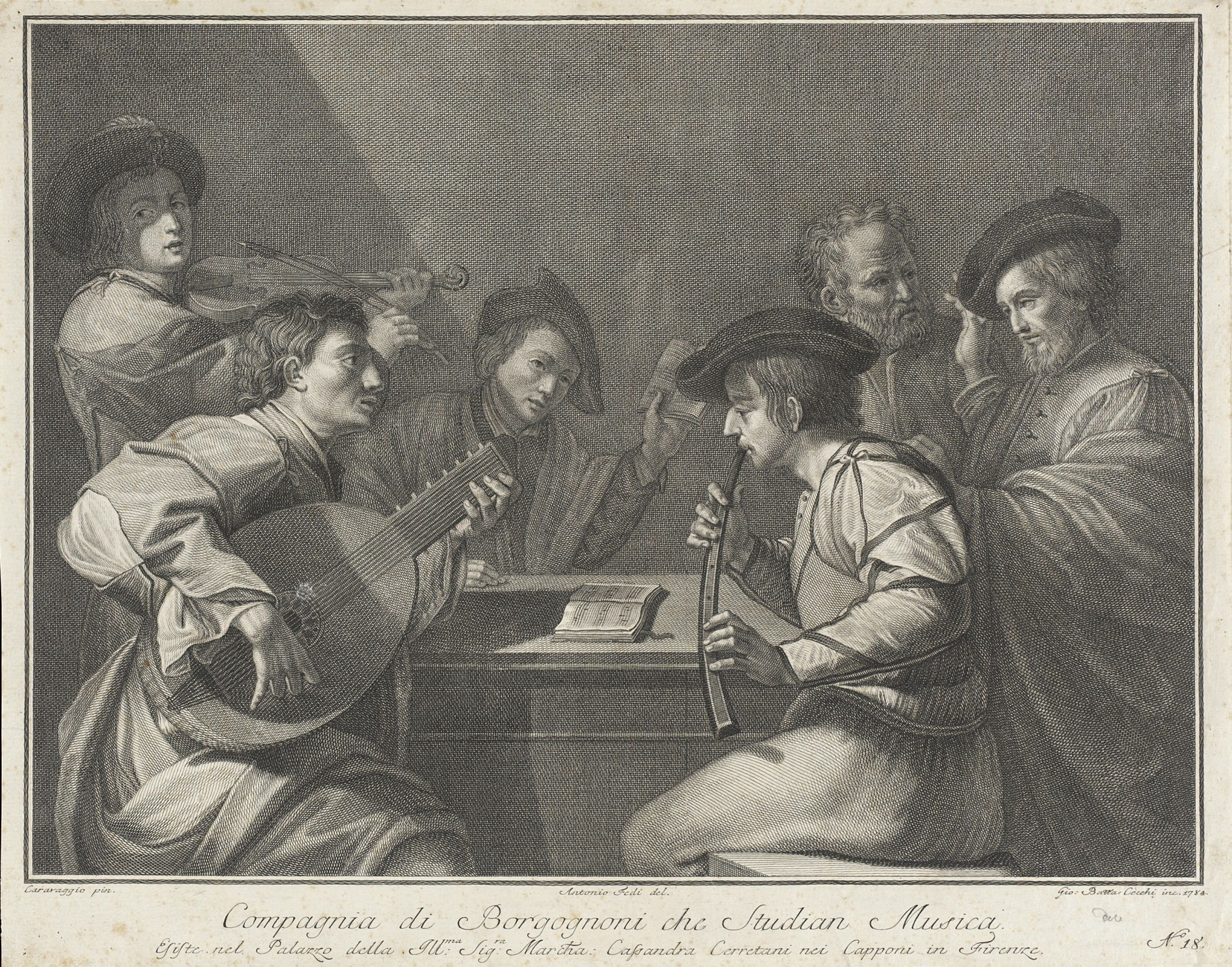
Group of Musicians, 1784 (Los Angeles County Museum of Art)

He was one of the artists commissioned by the Grand-Duke Leopold in 1769 to complete a 12 volume work: Serie degli uomini i più illustri nella pittura, scultura, e architettura con i loro elogi, e ritratti incisi in rame cominciando dalla sua prima restaurazione fino ai tempi presenti, containing over 300 engravings of artist portraits.

Among his portraits were depictions of the violinist Pietro Nardini, sculptor Vellano da Padova, painter Battista Franco, and reproductions of Habsburg-Lorraine family portraits painted by Giuseppe Piattoli in 1785 and 1791. He collaborated with the engraver Benedetto Eredi in a two-volume set of Bonarum artium splendori XII tabulae a praestantissimis Italiae pictoribus expressae 1776–1779. He engraved the sculptural collections of Gaetano Vascellini. Cecchi engraved a calendar with designs by Giuseppe Zocchi. He created engravings for the first two volumes of L'Etruria pittrice ovvero Storia della pittura toscana dedotta dai suoi monumenti che si esibiscono in stampa dal secolo X fino al presente by Marco Lastri.

In 1800, he created engravings recalling the resistance against Napoleonic invasions: Insurrection of Arezzo against the French, the Battle of the Piazza del Duomo of Arezzo, The loyalty of the Aretini and Cortona freed from the yoke of the French.

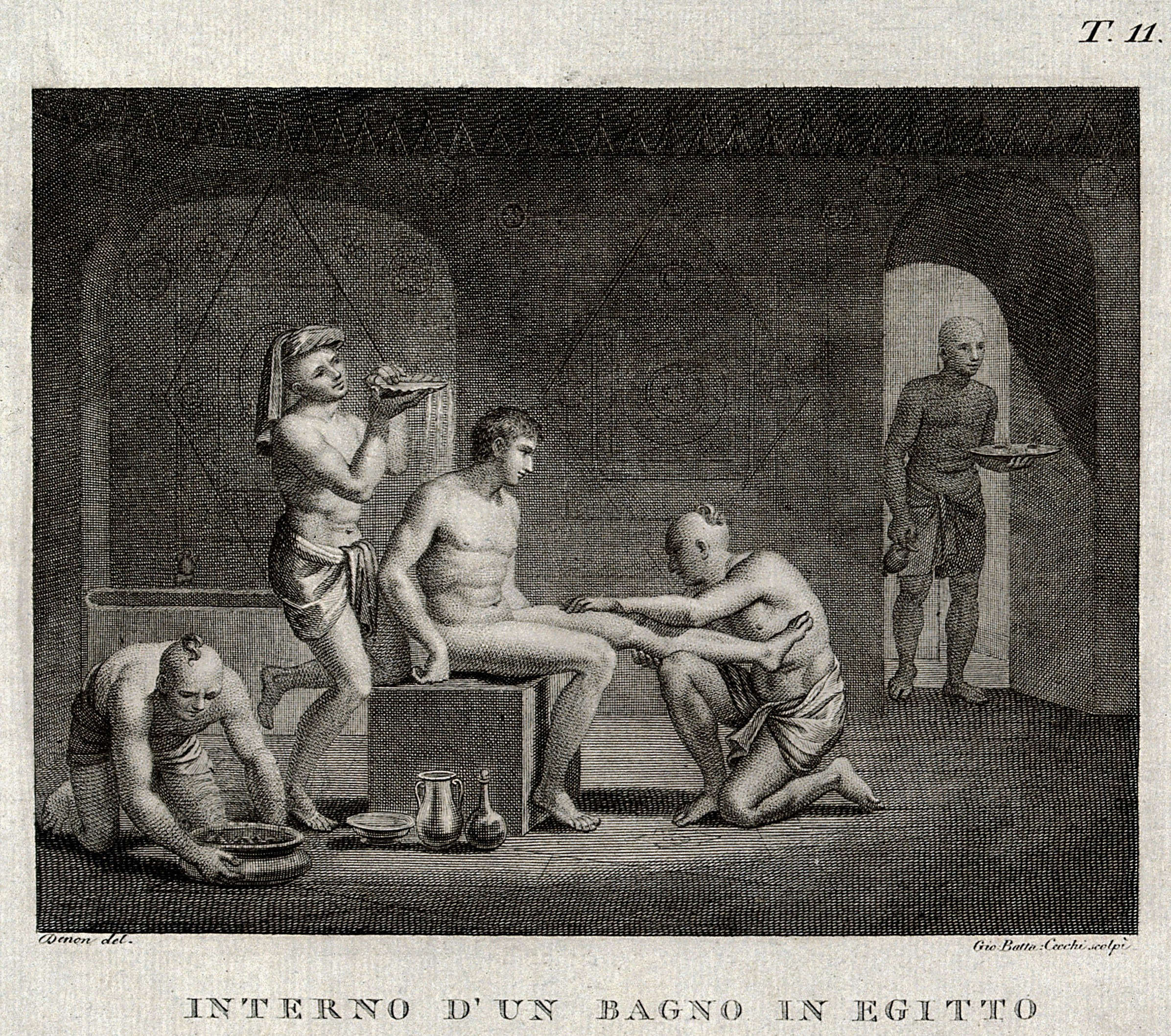
Giovanni Battista Cecchi, Interior of Egyptian bath House, 1808

== Other works ==
- Calling of St Andrew to Apostleship after Ludovico Cardi
- Martyrdom of St Laurence after Pietro da Cortona
- Martyrdom of St Vitalis after Federico Barrocci
- Stoning of St Stephen after Federico Barrocci
- Entombment of Christ after Daniele da Volterra
- Cataline's Conspiracy after Salvator Rosa

== Bibliography ==
- Ulrich Thieme - Felix Becker (c. 1900s), E. A. Seeman (ed.), Allgemeines Lexikon der bildenden Künstler von der Antike bis zur Gegenwart. 6: Carlini-Cioci, Leipzig, p. 8 s. Ad vocem
- Luigi Servolini, Dizionario illustrato degli incisori italiani moderni e contemporanei, 1955, p. 185, Gorlich, editor, Milan.
- Giuseppina Benassati; Lauro Rossi, eds. (1990), L'Italia nella Rivoluzione 1789 1799, Casalecchio di Reno: Grafis Edizioni, pp. 332–335, L'Italia nella Rivoluzione Catalog of Exhibit at Biblioteca Nazionale Centrale di Roma.
- Translated from the Italian Wikipedia entry
