= Dragan Plamenac =

Croatian Jewish composer and musicologist (1895 - 1983)

- Born: 8 February 1895; Zagreb, Austro-Hungarian Empire, (now Croatia)
- Died: 15 April 1983 (aged 88); Ede, Netherlands
- Education: University of Zagreb

Dragan Plamenac (born Dragan Siebenschein; 8 February 1895 – 15 March 1983) was a Croatian Jewish composer and musicologist.

Plamenac was born as Karl Siebenschein in Zagreb on 8 February 1895. His father, Robert Siebenschein, and grandfather, Josip Siebenschein, were leaders of the Israelites Zagreb community. His father was also the president of Croatian Music Institute from 1919 to 1929.

Plamenac graduated at the law school of the University of Zagreb. He studied composition with Franz Schreker in Vienna in 1912-13 and with Vítězslav Novák in Prague in 1919. He studied musicology with André Pirro at the Sorbonne in Paris and in 1925 completed his doctoral dissertation on motets and chansons by Johannes Ockeghem, supervised by Guido Adler at the Universität Wien. From the time of his stay in Paris, he had close contacts with Geneviève Thibault de Chambure (Comtesse de Chambure) and Nanie Bridgman [both well-known French musicologists from his generation], who also studied with Pirro.

He first worked as the piano accompanist at the Städtische Oper (today Deutsche Oper Berlin; 1926–27). Then in 1928 he began teaching musicology at the University of Zagreb as the private assistant professor. In 1939 Plamenac went to the United States as the Yugoslav representative to the congress of the American Musicological Society in New York City, and decided to remain in New York due to frequent persecution of Jews in Europe and World War II, becoming an American citizen in 1946. Plamenac was professor of music at the University of Illinois at Urbana–Champaign from 1954 to 1963, visiting professor at the University of Pittsburgh (1964–65) and the University of California at Santa Barbara (167). He received an honorary doctorate from the University of Illinois in 1976. Plamenac was the first to indicate to the value of the works of Croatian renaissance and baroque periods, particularly compositions by Ivan Lukačić and Tomaso Cecchino) which he published in modern editions. Plamenac died on 15 March 1983 in Ede, Netherlands.

In Plamenac's honor, Croatian Musicological Society awards every year Dragan Plamenac Award to best scientific achievement, primarily related to Croatian musical culture, Croatian or foreign scientists in the field of musicology.

== Bibliography ==
- Knežević, Snješka; Laslo, Aleksander (2011). Židovski Zagreb. Zagreb: AGM, Židovska općina Zagreb. ISBN 978-953-174-393-8.
- Kraus, Ognjen (1998). Dva stoljeća povijesti i kulture Židova u Zagrebu i Hrvatskoj. Zagreb: Židovska općina Zagreb. ISBN 953-96836-2-9.
- Snow, Robert (1977). Essays in Musicology: In Honor of Dragan Plamenac on His 70th Birthday. Cambridge, Massachusetts: Da Capo Press. ISBN 978-030-677-408-9.
