= Spanish Steps =

Stairs in Rome, Italy

- Stairway
- Scalinata di Trinità dei Monti (Italian)
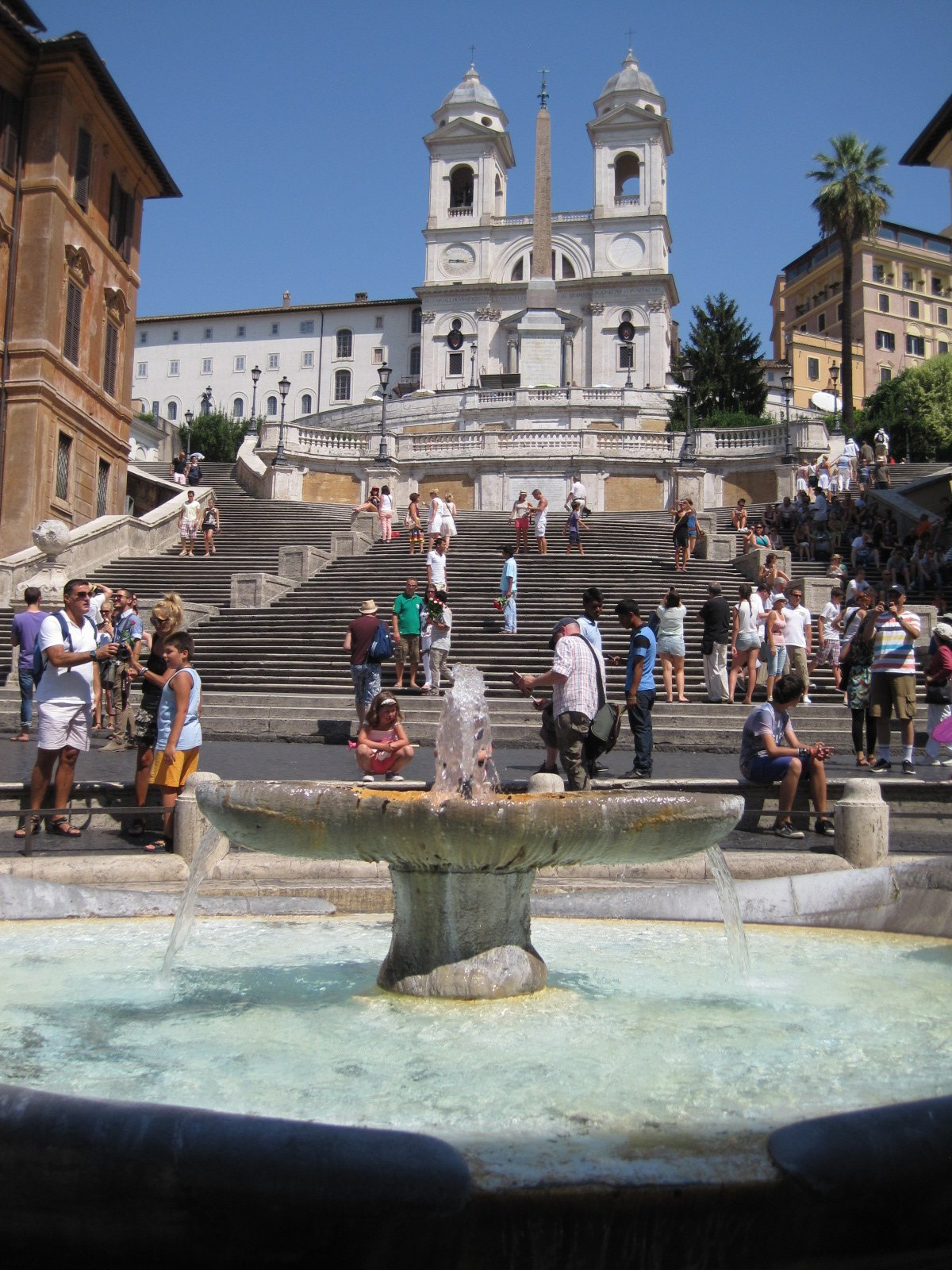
- The Spanish Steps, seen from Piazza di Spagna. In the foreground is the Fontana della Barcaccia.
- Design: Francesco de Sanctis
- Constructed: 1723–1725
- Opened: 1725
- Steps: 135
- Height: 29 m (95 ft)
- Location: Rome
- Interactive map of Spanish Steps
- Coordinates: 41°54′22″N 12°28′58″E

The Spanish Steps (Italian: Scalinata di Trinità dei Monti) in Rome, Italy, climb a steep slope between the Piazza di Spagna at the base and the Piazza Trinità dei Monti, dominated by the Trinità dei Monti church, at the top.

The monumental stairway of 135 steps is linked with the Trinità dei Monti church, under the patronage of the Bourbon kings of France, at the top of the steps and the Spanish Embassy to the Holy See in the Palazzo Monaldeschi at the bottom of the steps. The stairway was designed by the architects Francesco de Sanctis and Alessandro Specchi.

== History ==
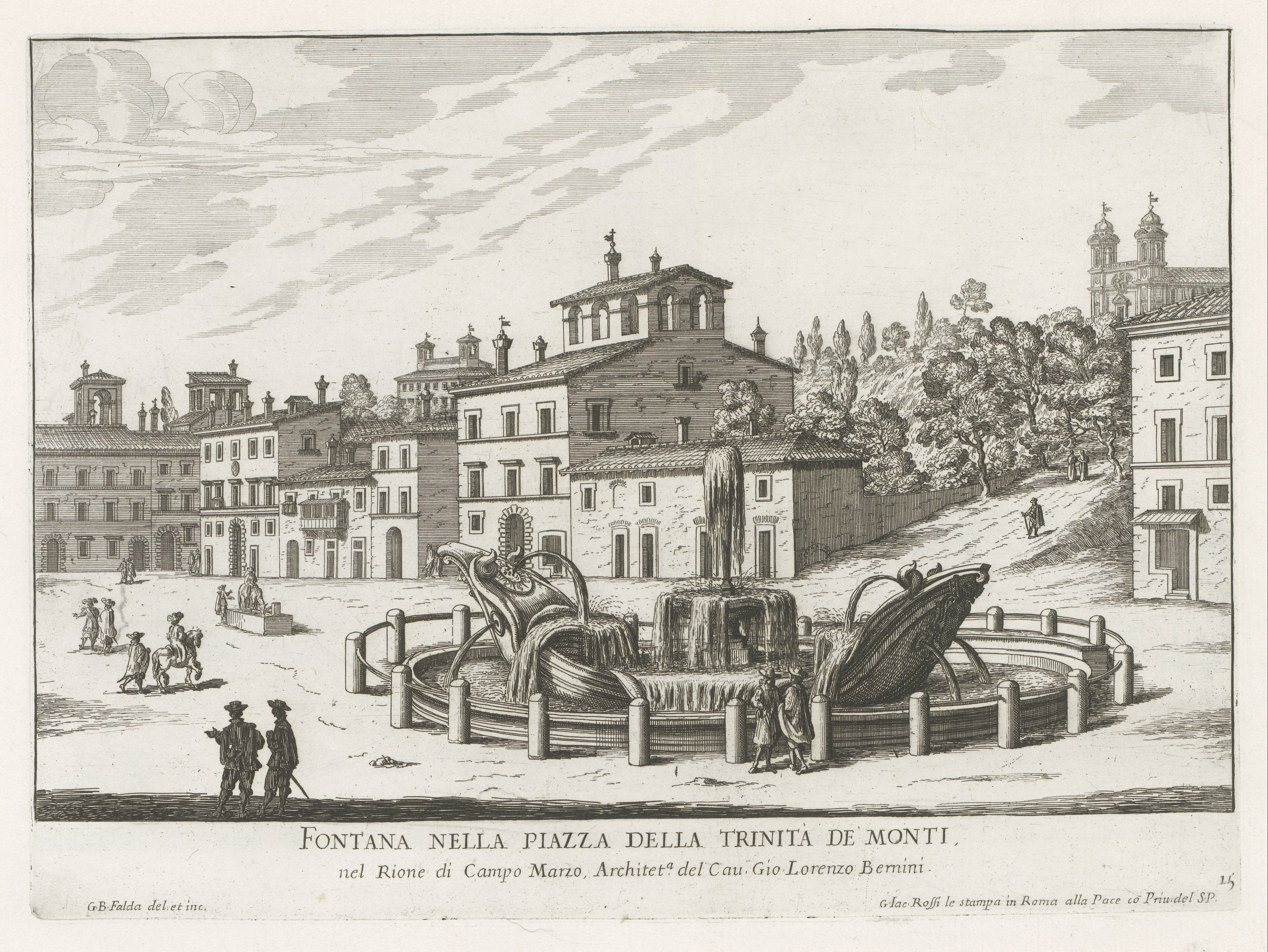
The site before the construction of the stairs in a late 17th century engraving by Giovanni Battista Falda

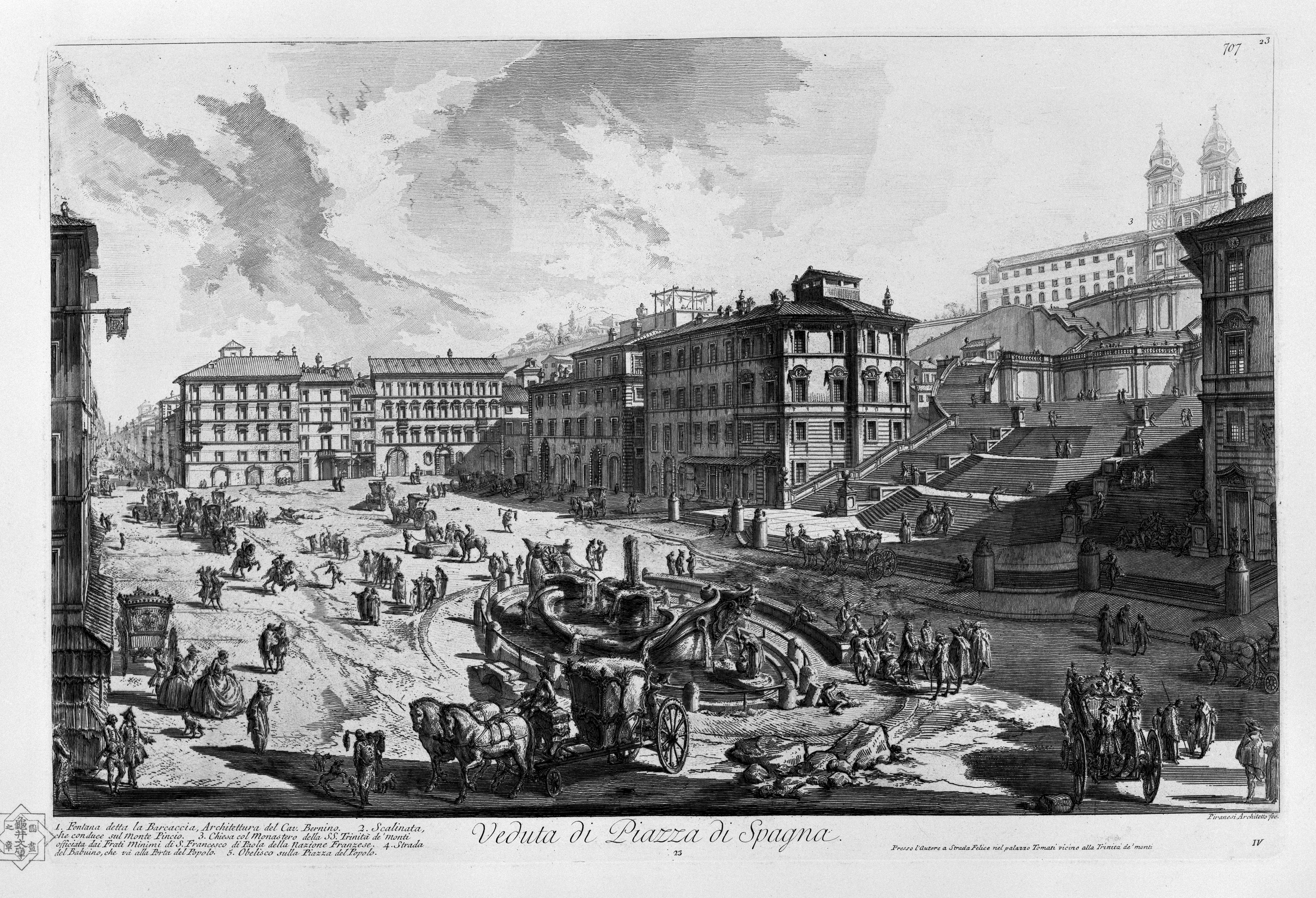
The Piazza di Spagna in an 18th-century etching by Giovanni Battista Piranesi, seen from south. The street on the left is Via del Babuino, leading to Piazza del Popolo.

Generations of heated debate over how the steep, 29-metre (95 ft) slope to the church on a shoulder of the Pincio should be urbanized preceded the final execution. Archival drawings from the 1580s show that Pope Gregory XIII was interested in constructing a stair to the recently completed façade of the French church.

French diplomat to the Holy See Étienne Gueffier died in 1660, leaving part of his fortune for the construction of the stairs. The Roman-educated Cardinal Mazarin took a personal interest in the project and entrusted it to his agent in Rome—whose plan included an equestrian monument of Louis XIV of France — an ambitious intrusion that created a furore in papal Rome. Mazarin died in 1661 and the pope in 1667, and so, while Gueffier's will was successfully contested by a nephew who claimed half, the project lay dormant until Pope Clement XI Albani renewed interest in it in the early 18th century.

A competition held in 1717 was won by Francesco de Sanctis, though Alessandro Specchi was long thought to have produced the winning entry. Little is known of the architect, who was favored by the French in the design process. His drawing was engraved by Girolamo Rossi in 1726, with a long dedication to Louis XV.

The solution is a gigantic inflation of some conventions of terraced garden stairs. The first such divided and symmetrical stairs were devised for the Belvedere Courtyard in the 1500s by Donato Bramante, while shaped and angled steps were introduced by Michelangelo in the vestibule to the Laurentian Library. The Bourbon fleur-de-lys and Innocent XIII's eagle and crown are carefully balanced in the sculptural details.

Mid-18th century writers Joseph de Lalande and Charles de Brosses noted that the steps were already in poor condition. They have been restored several times since, including from May to December 1995.

Sponsored by the Italian luxury brand Bulgari (which has its Italian flagship store in the nearby Via dei Condotti) a new renovation commenced on 8 October 2015, with the steps being reopened to the public on 21 September 2016. The restoration of the almost 32,300 square feet (3,000 m^{2}) of travertine stone, as well as brick, marble and plaster employed more than 80 people and cost €1.5 million.

Over the years, several city administrations have tried to dissuade visitors from getting too comfortable on the steps, banning loitering and eating, but the ordinances have not been enforced. However, in July 2019 the administration of Mayor Virginia Raggi, as part of an attempt to get ill-mannered tourists to behave themselves in Rome, introduced more stringent ordinances designed to "guarantee decorum, security and legality". These regulations allow for fines of €250 for sitting down on the steps and up to €400 for dirtying or damaging the steps (including eating on them or pushing a pram up or down them).

== Piazza di Spagna ==
In the Piazza di Spagna at the base is the Early Baroque fountain called Fontana della Barcaccia ("Fountain of the longboat"), built in 1627–29 and often credited to Pietro Bernini, father of a more famous son, Gian Lorenzo Bernini, who is recently said to have collaborated on the decoration. The elder Bernini had been the pope's architect for the Acqua Vergine, since 1623. According to a legend, Pope Urban VIII had the fountain installed after he had been impressed by a boat brought here by a flood of the Tiber.

In the piazza, at the corner on the right as one begins to climb the steps, is the house where English poet John Keats lived and died in 1821; it is now a museum dedicated to his memory, full of memorabilia of the English Romantic generation. On the same right side stands the 15th-century former cardinal Lorenzo Cybo de Mari's palace, now Ferrari di Valbona, a building altered in 1936 to designs by Marcello Piacentini, the main city planner during Fascism, with modern terraces perfectly in harmony with the surrounding baroque context.

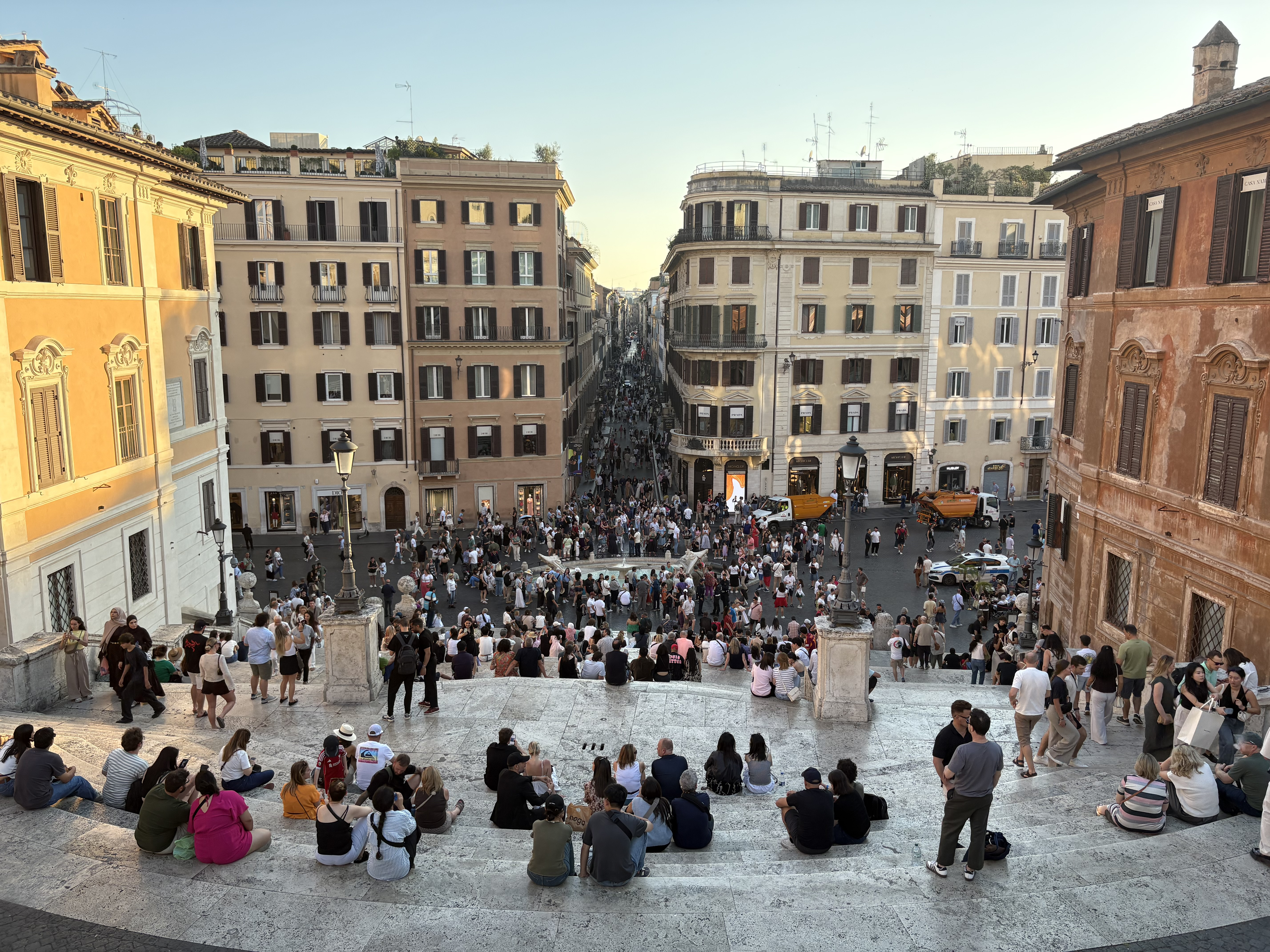
The Piazza di Spagna viewed from the top of the Spanish Steps.

== Uses ==
At the top, the stairway ramp up the Pincio which is the Pincian Hill. The Villa Medici can be reached from the top of the steps.

During Christmas time, a 19th-century criba manger is displayed on the first landing of the staircase. During springtime, just before the anniversary of the foundation of Rome on 21 April, part of the steps are covered by pots of azaleas, up until early May. In modern times, the Spanish Steps have included a small cut-flower market. The steps are not a place for eating lunch, being forbidden by Roman urban regulations, but they are usually crowded with people.

== Incidents ==
In March 1986, the opening of Italy's first McDonalds near the Spanish Steps inspired Carlo Petrini and friends to form Arcigola, an organisation that became the Slow Food movement.

In May 2022, a Saudi national drove a rented Maserati through the steps, descending the first flight of steps before stopping. Fractures were subsequently found on the 16th and 29th steps of the right-hand flight rising up from Piazza di Spagna. The man, who abandoned the car and fled the scene, was later apprehended at Milan Malpensa Airport after being identified through surveillance cameras and was charged with inflicting aggravated damage to cultural heritage and monuments.

In June 2022, two American tourists launched a scooter three times down the steps, damaging the third-to-last travertine step of the second ramp and dislodging a 10-centimeter piece of marble that cost €25,000 ($27,000) in repairs. The couple were apprehended by police, fined €400 each and were banned from the vicinity of the site for two days.

In April 2023, climate protestors from Ultima Generazione poured a charcoal-based black powder into the Fontana della Barcaccia, discoloring its water and leaving stains on its marble surface. The protesters were apprehended by authorities and detained.

In June 2025, a man in his 80s drove a gray Mercedes-Benz A-Class halfway down the steps before becoming stuck. The man later tested negative for drugs and alcohol, according to police. The vehicle was removed by the Vigili del Fuoco using a crane at the foot of the steps to lift the vehicle away. The steps were then closed to the public in order for archaeologists to inspect them for any damage which may have been caused during this incident. The man was reported to have told police officers that he was on his way to work. The incident was captured on video and circulated online.

== In literature ==
The steps are featured in several literary works. Notable examples include:

- Numerous scenes in Alfred Bester's novel The Stars My Destination (1956)
- F. Scott Fitzgerald's novel Tender Is the Night (1933)
- Anthony Burgess' novel Abba Abba (1977)
- Dan Simmons's novel The Fall of Hyperion (1990)
- Tom Clancy's novel The Teeth of the Tiger (2003)

== In media ==
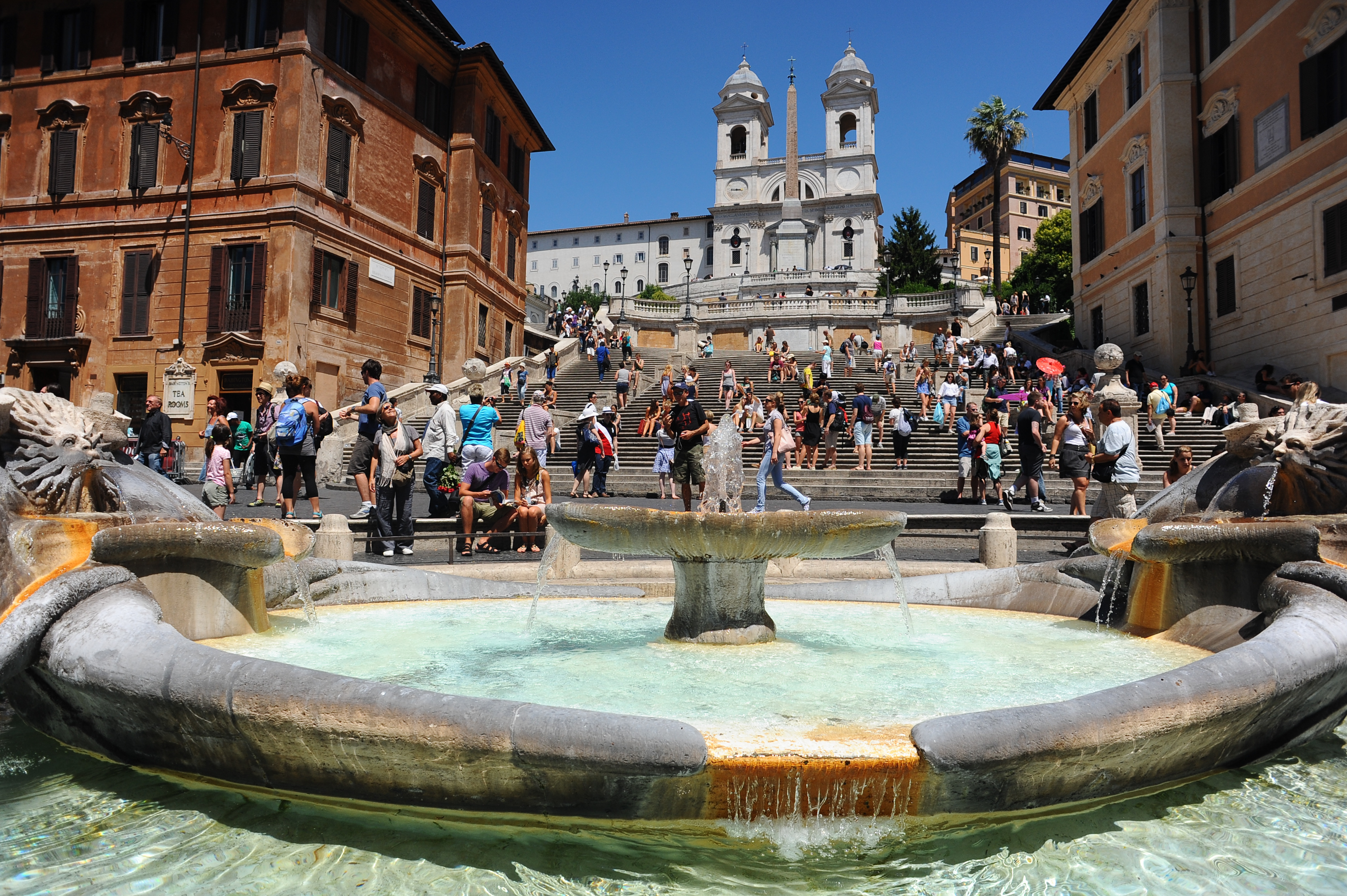
The Spanish Steps. Note: the cream-colored building partially visible at the extreme right edge includes the apartment where John Keats lived, now the Keats-Shelley Memorial House.

=== In film and TV ===
The film Le Ragazze di Piazza di Spagna of 1952, directed by Luciano Emmer and starring Liliana Bonfatti, Lucia Bosè, Cosetta Greco, and Marcello Mastroianni, centers on the Spanish Steps.

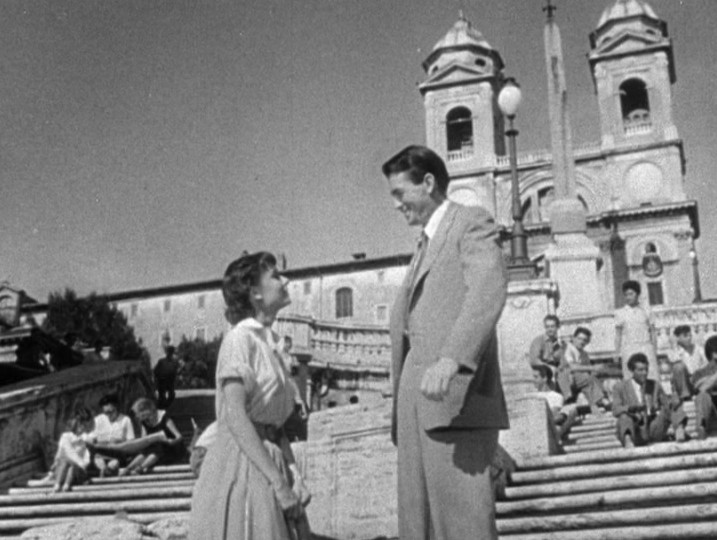
Trailer of the 1953 film Roman Holiday with Gregory Peck and Audrey Hepburn on the Spanish Steps

The film Roman Holiday (1953), starring Audrey Hepburn and Gregory Peck featured the Spanish Steps.

In the 1963 Italian giallo film The Girl Who Knew Too Much, Nora witnesses a murder on the Spanish Steps.

The apartment that was the setting for The Roman Spring of Mrs. Stone (1961) is halfway up on the right. Bernardo Bertolucci's Besieged (1998) is also set in a house next to the Steps. The Steps were featured prominently in the film version of The Talented Mr. Ripley (1999), starring Matt Damon in the title role.

The Spanish Steps are mentioned (as the Spanish Stairs) in the first verse of the song When I Paint My Masterpiece (1971).

The Spanish Steps are referenced in the song "Credo" by the Swiss/English band Refugee as the Spanish Stairs.

In a film for German titled Martha (1974), directed by Rainer Werner Fassbinder, the father of the title character (played by Margit Carstensen) dies while climbing the Spanish Steps.

In 1998, the music video for Kadim Al Sahir's “Qouly Ohiboka” (“Say That You Love Me”) featured the Spanish Steps among its filming locations.

In an episode of Everybody Loves Raymond (Season 5, Episode 1: Italy) which aired on 2 October 2000, Ray, Debra, Frank and Marie climb the Spanish Steps during a family vacation in Rome.

An episode of the anime series Gunslinger Girl, entitled "Gelato (Ice Cream)," which first aired in 2003, features the protagonist by the Spanish Steps having her "reward" of ice cream after having completed a successful raid.

In the film To Rome with Love (2012), Hayley (Alison Pill) and Michelangelo Santoli (Flavio Parenti) met on the Spanish Steps.

The Spanish Steps were the setting of a 'Roadblock' task during The Amazing Race 24 (2014) in which contestants had to count the steps.

In the 2000 film “It Had To Be You”, it is the dream of the female lead, a school teacher who has never been out of NYC, to go to the Spanish Steps. She and her love interest imagine they are there while in a fountain in Central Park.

The Spanish Steps are featured in a scene in the film The Man From U.N.C.L.E. (2015), in which Illya (Armie Hammer), posing as a Russian architect, attempts to explain to Gaby (Alicia Vikander) that the Steps were actually made by a Russian architect.

Midway through the animated film Love Live! The School Idol Movie: Over the Rainbow (2019), the Steps were featured prominently as the site where the main idol group Aqours performed the main musical number of the film, "Hop? Stop? Nonstop!," during their overseas trip from Numazu, Japan to Rome.

The Spanish Steps feature in car action scene in Fast X (2023).

The Spanish Steps feature in a car chase in Mission: Impossible – Dead Reckoning Part One. The end credits assure the viewer that, for the car chase, a replica on a studio backlot was used. The film also premiered on the Spanish Steps on 19 June 2023.

The Spanish Steps appear as part of the Rome Avanti course in Mario Kart Tour and subsequently in Mario Kart 8 Deluxe, being added to both games in 2023.

=== In art ===
On 16 January 2008, the Italian artist Graziano Cecchini covered the Spanish Steps with hundreds of thousands of multicolored plastic balls. He claimed it was done to raise international awareness of the situation of the Karen people in Myanmar, and as a protest against the living conditions of artists in Italy.

== Local landmarks ==
- Babington's tea room
- Fontana della Barcaccia
- Giorgio De Chirico House
- Keats-Shelley Memorial House
- Palazzo di Spagna

== See also ==
- List of tourist attractions in Rome

== Notes ==
Preceded by Ponte Sisto	Landmarks of Rome; Spanish Steps	Succeeded by Appian Way
