= Gelati Cecchi =

Italian gelato company

Gelati Cecchi

Gelati Cecchi is an Italian gelato company founded in 1936 by Gabriello Cecchi in Turin. Today the company is led by his grandson Stefano Cecchi.

== History ==
=== 1936–1950 ===
Gabriello Cecchi relocated to Turin in 1936. He was an Italian immigrant who was born in Ponte Buggianese, Tuscany, but resided in France and learnt how to make gelato from French citizens. He opened a 200-seat gelateria with an accompanying workshop in Corso Palestro with help from his wife and his brother Tancredi. His crème gialla custard flavor, which was at the time regarded as the best in Turin, supposedly contributed to the business's rapid growth.

=== 1950–1960 ===
At the end of the Second World War – during which Gabriello fought alongside the partisans (he was the commander of the 77th Garibaldi Brigade in Italy and the Third International Brigade in Spain) – Gelati Cecchi made a giant leap towards industrialisation. The gelato parlour in Corso Palestro was no longer big enough for its founder, who wished to distribute his products beyond the borders of Turin. New machines and technologies became available, hence the first production plant in Via Abate Chanoux was set up: an establishment that initially employed 40 people. Gelati Cecchi produced gelato lollies, cones, sandwiches and tubs. The workshop had modern pasteurising and freezing equipment supplied by Cecchi's friends, Bruto and Poerio Carpigiani. A sales network of entrepreneurs was set up, selling and delivering gelato throughout the regions of Piedmont and Liguria. The increase in production was supported by Cecchi's first simple promotional efforts.

=== 1960–1973 ===
In the Sixties, Gabriello Cecchi streamlined the company's structure and focused on industry. He opened a new 3,000-metre production plant in Vinovo. His son Raimondo, who had recently graduated from law school, was now helping him. Gelati Cecchi grew until it employed 300 people and had a network of 120 agents who supplied as many as 1,500 points of sale, expanding to cover the whole of northern Italy and part of the French Riviera. The brand was now a market leader, and its marketing efforts attempted to find an image that would be more recognizable and up-to-date. This was how Cecchino, the cartoon that helped enliven the company's message, came about. Cecchino decorated the fridges and enamel boards displayed at the entrance to the shops the company supplied and, next to him, gelati that had now been given their own names: Capriccio, Canestrino, Secchiello, Mattonella, Graziella, Nobilino, Parigina, Canguro and Mela Cha Cha Cha. The company's communication strategy featured sports, and linked its name to Pallacanestro Biella, which competed in the A1 league and had players such as Rudy Bennett and Charlie Caglieris. Gabriello became one of the ten biggest Italian gelato companies and joined other prominent gelato companies in setting up a trade association that was presided over by Raimondo Cecchi for two years. At the height of its success in the early 1970s, Gelati Cecchi was acquired by the Barilla Group through its subsidiary, Tanara, only to become part of the Italgel SME Group, alongside Motta and Alemagna.

=== 1973–1993 ===
Gabriello Cecchi became manager of the Italgel Group dealing with research and development. At the beginning of the 1980s, a new brand was founded in gourmet cuisine which immediately met with the public's approval: Antica Gelateria del Corso. The Knight has followed the development of the project step by step bringing forth unforgettable products such as the ice cream coconut, the gelato lemon and the tartufo.

In 1993, the Italgel group was sold for 475 billion lire to the Swiss multinational food corporation, Nestlé. The Cecchi family left the gelato business, with the exception of Silvano Moschini, the brother of Luisa Cecchi, who kept the family tradition alive in his traditional gelato parlour in Via Nizza.

=== 2014 ===
Stefano Gabriello Cecchi – Raimondo's son and Gabriello's grandson, the founder of a record company, a creator of luxury brands and a global marketing and communication consultant – decided to revive Gelati Cecchi using his grandfather's formulas.
