= Agostino Castellacci =

Italian painter

Agostino Castellacci (born 1670) was an Italian painter of the Baroque period.

== Biography ==
He was born in Ascoli Piceno, and was initially a pupil of Antonio Cecchini, then he joined, along with fellow pupil Francesco Mancini, the studio of Carlo Cignani. He painted a San Biagio for the church of San Giacomo in Pesaro.
