= Gino Sarrocchi =

Italian lawyer and politician (1870–1950)

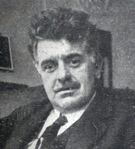

Minister for Public Works
- In office 1 July 1924 – 3 January 1925
- Prime Minister: Benito Mussolini
- Preceded by: Gabriello Carnazza
- Succeeded by: Giovanni Giuriati

Personal details
- Born: 28 April 1870 Siena, Kingdom of Italy
- Died: 27 May 1950 (aged 80) Florence, Italy
- Occupation: Lawyer

Gino Sarrocchi (1870–1950) was an Italian lawyer and politician who served as the minister of public works in the cabinet of Benito Mussolini for one year between 1924 and 1925.

== Biography ==
Sarrocchi was born in Siena on 28 April 1870. He was a lawyer by profession. He was also a landowner in Tuscany.

Sarrochi served at the Italian parliament for four terms. He was first elected in 1913 and also served in the periods 1919–1921, 1921–1923 and 1924–1929. In addition, he also served at the Italian Senate.

He was appointed minister of public works to the first cabinet of Benito Mussolini on 1 July 1924. He was one of the liberal ministers in the cabinet. The other one was Alessandro Casati, minister of education, who resigned from the office on 3 January 1925 together with Sarrocchi.

He died in Florence on 27 May 1950. Next day he was buried following a funeral ceremony.

=== Awards ===
Sarrocchi was awarded numerous honours, including the Order of the Crown of Italy (four times) and the Order of Saints Maurice and Lazarus (Commander).
