= Gabriello Carnazza =

Italian lawyer and politician (1871–1931)

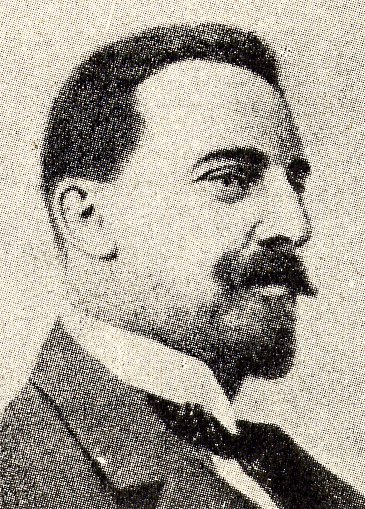

Minister for Public Works
- In office 31 October 1922 – 1 July 1924
- Prime Minister: Benito Mussolini
- Preceded by: Office established
- Succeeded by: Gino Sarrocchi

Personal details
- Born: 1871
- Died: 1931 (aged 59–60)
- Party: National Fascist Party
- Occupation: Lawyer

Gabriello Carnazza (1871–1931) was an Italian lawyer and politician who was the minister of public works in the first cabinet of Benito Mussolini.

== Biography ==
Carnazza was born in 1871. He hailed from a Sicilian family. He was a lawyer by profession. He had a liberal political stance before joining the National Fascist Party in the early 1920s.

Carnazza was appointed minister of public works in the first cabinet of Benito Mussolini in 1922. During his term a law on the classification and maintenance of public roads dated 15 November 1923 was put into force which has been called the "Carnazza decree" or "Carnazza law". He died in 1931.
