= Chechi, Attock =

Chechi
- Village
- Location within Pakistan
- Coordinates: 33°52′32″N 72°28′26″E
- Country: Pakistan
- Province: Punjab
- District: Attock
- Tehsil: Attock
- Time zone: UTC+5 (PST)

Chechi is a village located at 70 km (43 mi) in west from capital of Pakistan, Islamabad on Grand Trunk Road in Attock District of Punjab, Pakistan.

== Location ==
Chechi is located at the edge of Khyber-Pakhtunkhwa-Punjab. It is located 20 kilometres north from Attock City and 80 kilometres east from Peshawar. The region came under Islamic rule in 1001 after Battle of Peshawar.
