= Graziano Cecchini =

Italian artist and activist

Graziano Cecchini (born 23 October 1953) is an Italian artist and activist best known for his works of "vandalism" art.

== Works ==
=== Trevi Fountain Dye ===
On 19 October 2007, Cecchini poured a can of dye into the Trevi Fountain in Rome, causing the fountain to spout red water for several hours. He also left behind several leaflets urging the public to "embrace colour". Rome police identified Cecchini as the vandal from CCTV footage and placed him under investigation for allegedly damaging a historical or artistic building.

Cecchini later took responsibility for the vandalism on the TV show Le Iene: "There is the Red Carpet Red, red Valentino and red Ferrari. Now there is also the red Trevi." He continued: "I do not accept that it is still said that it was an act of vandalism; I prepared everything in detail and our artistic provocation did not cause damage to the monument. First, it was not aniline that was used, as all newspapers have written. That stuff is carcinogenic and would not have had an immediate effect. Simple and harmless, environmentally friendly tempera was used. Of course, the use of red is not random; I'm an artist and I know the subtle power of each colour, I wanted to get that red and not another, not leaving the percentage of tint to chance. To ensure there would be no damage, the mixture was first tested in a pool, although it was understood that the real vandal, the alderman for cultural heritage, the fountain is so filthy and caked with limestone it would be impossible to stain the marble." The act was done as a protest against the Rome Film Festival organization.

After the incident, technicians shut off the fountain and were able to restore a clear flow. Neither the fountain nor its statues were permanently damaged.

=== Spanish Steps ===
Cecchini's other notable performance occurred on 16 January 2008, when he rolled 500,000 coloured balls down the Spanish Steps. Each ball "represented a lie told by a politician," Cecchini told the Italian press.

The stunt was intended to draw attention to the struggles of the Karen people. "I am leaving for Burma, these balls will help the Karen people," he said as he walked down the steps with balls bouncing around him.

Cecchini paid about twenty-five thousand euros for the balls and ten trucks to transport them. Italian police arrested him at the scene.

== Biographical data ==
Graziano Cecchini was born in Rome on 22 October 1953. In 2007, he dyed Fontana di Trevi in red, kicking off a series of transgressive art performances that have been around the world.

At the Trevi Fountain follows Trinity de 'Monti, "from RossoTrevi to the QuadriColour", in this performance, 500.000 coloured balls roll from the steps of Piazza di Spagna, combining the main manifestos of Futurism of the third millennium.

He becomes the testimonial of De Chirico Foundation, for which he created two works that, in 2010, together with the works of Maestro Giorgio De Chirico, were exhibited in a “travelling exhibition” in Miami, New York and Los Angeles.

In August 2008, he made a photographic complaint reportage in the Burmese jungle, following the Karen Liberation Army.

In 2008, he was called by Vittorio Sgarbi in Salemi, together with Oliviero Toscani, as “Alderman of Nothing”. A Salemi makes a short film, "Poggioreale, the country that does not exist" and organises various exhibitions and publishes reports on Karen about a book of photo-journalism “Kaw too lei”.

In October 2010, in Florence, he created, on the occasion of the Festival of Creativity, The Rock, a site of 400 tons of marble, mobilising the main quarries of the Apuan Alps. He collaborates with various companies marble industry, the Province and the Confederation of Massa and Carrara.

From 2010 to 2011, he was involved in redesigning a factory in Pisa, during that period he worked on his art, paintings and sculptures.

From December 2011 to February 2012, his exhibition was presented in Margutta at the Margutta RistorArte; the curator of the exhibition was Francesca Barbi Marinetti, nephew of Filippo Tommaso Marinetti. The exhibition was entitled "Per Grazia-no ricevuta. Le Ma-donne”.

He is the creator and producer of the project of artistic design of Haute Couture "X-Art".

The project X-Art provides the reuse of scraps of fabric from the historic Maison of Haute Couture in Rome. The Maison Sarli, Gattinoni, Balestra, Piattelli, and Camillo Bona have signed up to the project. During the week of Haute Couture "AltaRoma" (July 2012) was submitted by the work number zero, The Three Graces. The work was presented at the First Luxury Art Hotel, where she stayed for over two months. He is currently on display at the Academy of Costume and Fashion in Rome.

He has exhibited his work at the 54th International Art Exhibition Biennale di Venezia, and his work is in the catalogue of the exhibition. Some of his works are in several private collections. The performance of the Fontana di Trevi was published in the catalogue Taschen “Trespass, the Uncommissioned Public Art” (2010) presented in New York, Miami and Los Angeles, and then translated and published in several languages. In August 2012, he received the International Prize of the City of Ostia (41st edition), Art section. His performances have been covered by the major international newspapers and television (Corriere della Sera, Repubblica, Le Figaro, Le Monde, New York Times, Los Angeles Post, Rai1, Rai2, Rai3, Canale5, BBC....). 2011 54th International Art Exhibition of the Venice Biennale, special initiative for the 150th anniversary of the unification of Italy. Catalogue "The State of the Art, Regions of Italy"; Spring 2013 interview on L’Officiel Hommes May 2013 is present at the Palazzo della Borsa in Genoa with a work "La Città e la mente" for an exhibition / Charity auction carried out by the ass.ALFaPP and by the Genoese Rotary; June 2013 is the testimonial of the Gramsciana event in Ales (Sardinia) at the invitation of the Gramscian library honours Gramsci with his performance December 2013 article in the newspaper LA STAMPA, pages culture. February 2014, invited to the first Biennial of contemporary art in the principality of Monaco; May 2015, at the Turin Book Fair, performs a conference performance. Named Alchemic Explosion in and of Art. May 2015, artistic director of the Ventimiglia event in bloom; June 2015, one of his works was exhibited at the Palazzo Bianco Musei in Strada Nuova, Genova, for the Independence Day of the US consulate. June 2015, One of his works in ceramic sculpture of 3 metres Mother Earth GMO is currently exhibited in Piazza Borea d'Olmo, Sanremo, Italy September / October 2015 artistic direction of "Incontemporanea Arte Attiva" in Palermo, Italy. Oct / Nov 2015 collaborates with the Garaventa foundation (Genova Nervi), Italy, for the project "G factory", we broke the colours. November 2015 performance in Genoa, Italy, against violence against women, “one hundred thousand petals of roses” in the fountain in Piazza De Ferrari, in support of the international event, the art of floral design. December 2015, published as a co-author the book "Futurism of the third millennium. December 2016 curator of the exhibition Evasioni In Arte works created by the inmates of the Rebibbia prison, third house in the district of Durazzo Bombrini, Genova, Italy May–July 2017 Artistic Director of Steel project, realised at Villa Bombrini, in collaboration with the Liguria Region, Cornigliano spa, Ansaldo Foundation and Ilva Cornigliano RSU / Ilva and Fiom Genova, Italy May 2017, on the occasion of the visit of the Holy Father, Pope Francis, at the request of the Ilva Cornigliano Genoa, Italy management, the scenography was realised that will welcome the Pope and the work "fisher of men" performed on 3 steel plates October 2017 performance repetita juvant ten years of red trevi fountain gets millions of contacts on the web. ROSSOTREVI is the documentary that tells the story of many of his performance. Directed by Marco Gallo and produced by SINGLE FILMS : NICOLAS STOPPA-HARIS DONIAS. February 2018 finalist with the trailer of the film "rossotrevi twice in history" at Barcelona Planet Film Festival March 2018 finalist with the trailer of the film "rossotrevi twice in history" at the Bucharest Short Cine Festival April 2018 finalist with the trailer of the film "rossotrevi twice in history" at the Los Angeles Independent Cinema Showcase! May 2018 winner of the first prize at the Kalat Nissa Film Festival (Caltanissetta) with the trailer of the film "Rossotrevi twice in history". directed by Marco Gallo August 2018 "Oxidations" exhibition at Palazzo Tursi, Genoa, Italy, photos on steel Ilva plates.

September 2018 for the best Trailer award (India) finalist with the trailer of the film "RossoTrevi twice in history". directed by Marco Gallo, The Buddha International Film Festival India, September 2018, special section at Valdarno (Florence, Italy) film Festival with the trailer of the film "RossoTrevi twice in history". directed by Marco Gallo September 2018, Militello (Sicily) film Festival, Special mention with the trailer of the film "Rossotrevi twice in history". directed by Marco Gallo April 201,9 participates in the CANNES MIP TV with Single Film presents the film RossoTrevi twice in history.

== Bibliography ==
- Il futurismo del terzo millennio - conversazioni con Graziano Cecchini, Tedeschini Davide, Cecchini Graziano (Roma, 2015) ISBN 978-88-7557-479-6
