= Checco =

Checco (pronounced [ˈkekko]) is a diminutive of the Italian masculine given name Francesco, also occurring as a surname. Notable people with the name include:

- Al Checco (1921–2015), American actor
- Checco Bruni (born 1973), Italian sports sailor
- Checco Durante (1893–1976), Italian actor
- Checco Rissone (1909–1985), Italian actor
- Checco Zalone (born 1977), Italian comedian, actor, showman, singer, musician, cabaret performer, screenwriter, director and film producer

== See also ==
- Don Checco, opera by Nicola De Giosa
- Cecco
- Checchi
- Checca (disambiguation)
- Chicco (name)
