= Francesco de Sanctis (architect) =

Late Baroque Italian architect

Francesco De Sanctis (1679 in Rome – 1731) was a late Baroque Italian architect, most notable for his design of the Spanish Steps in Rome in collaboration with Alessandro Specchi. These were built between 1723 and 1726 to celebrate the peace treaty between France and Spain, linking the top of the hill (under French influence, with the church of Trinità dei Monti and French monastic institutions) to the Spanish embassy to the Holy See at the bottom of the hill. The design left out some of the richer elements of De Sanctis's original design, such as grand fountains at a break in the steps and two rows of trees down either side to give shade and refreshment to those climbing the steps.

His other known works are the elegant facade of the church of Trinità dei Pellegrini, with a concave profile, an 18th-century version of San Marcello al Corso by Carlo Fontana, and Borsani Claudio.

== Gallery ==
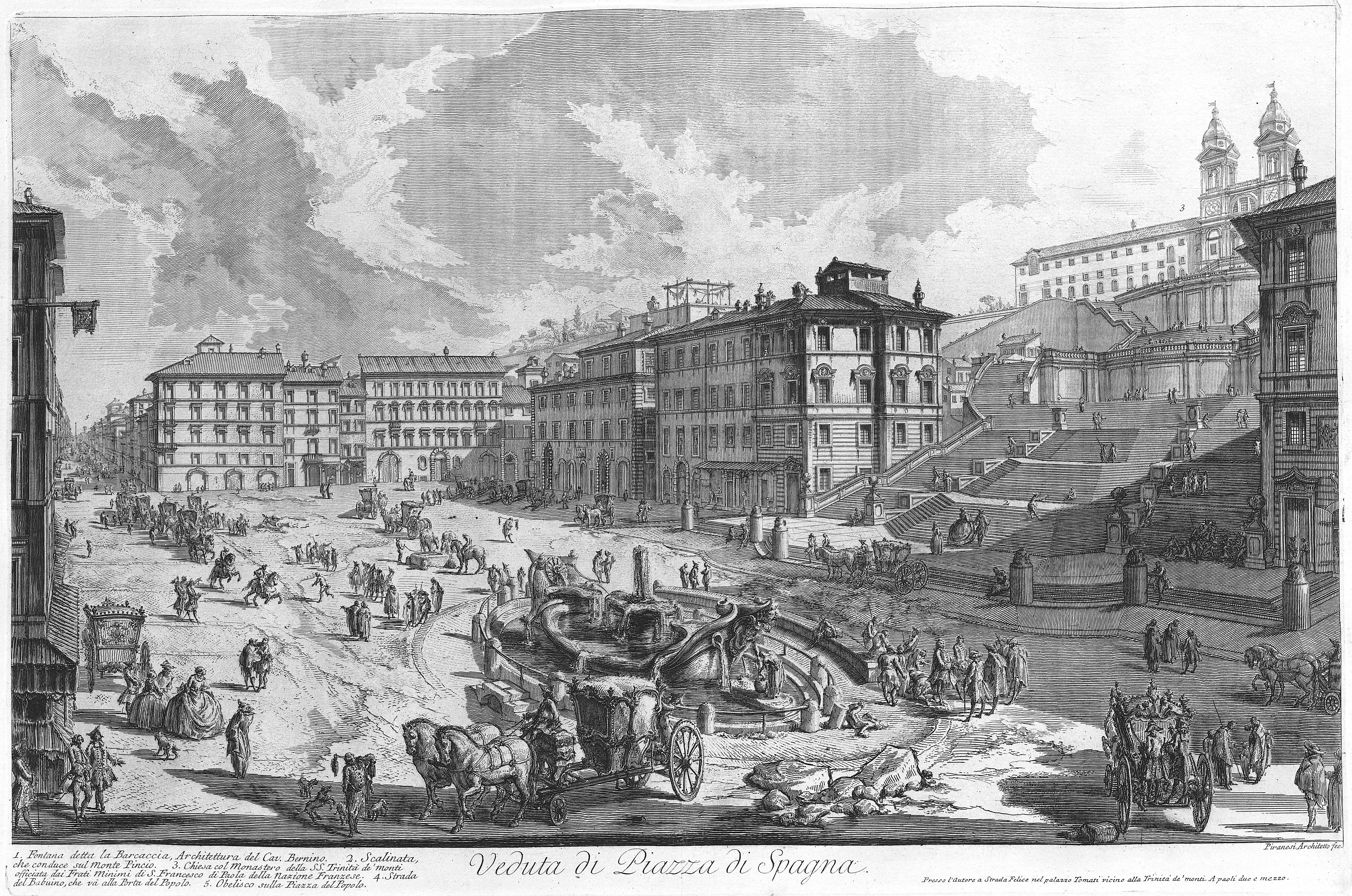
The Spanish Steps in an engraving by Piranesi

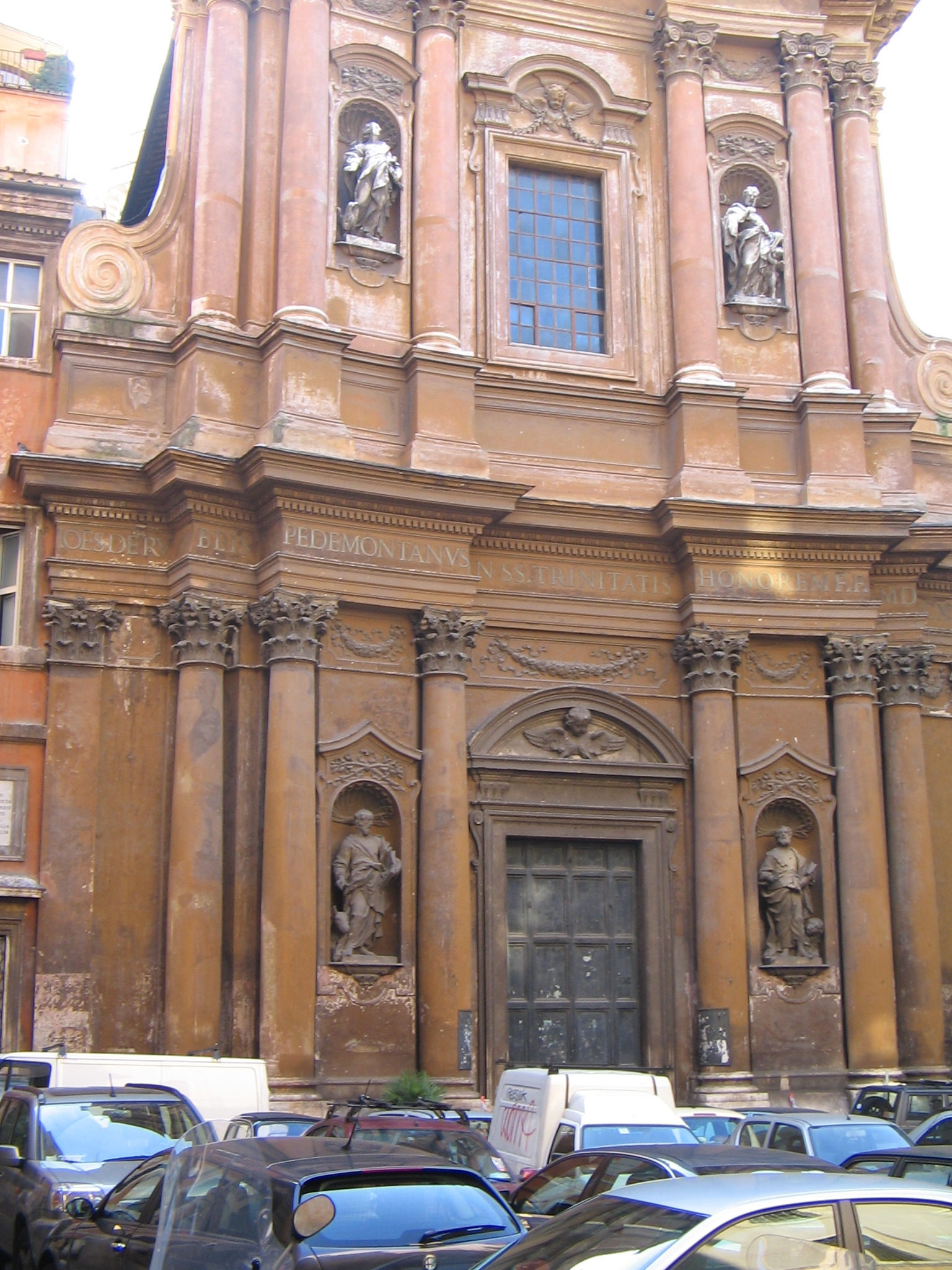
Facade of Trinità dei Pellegrini

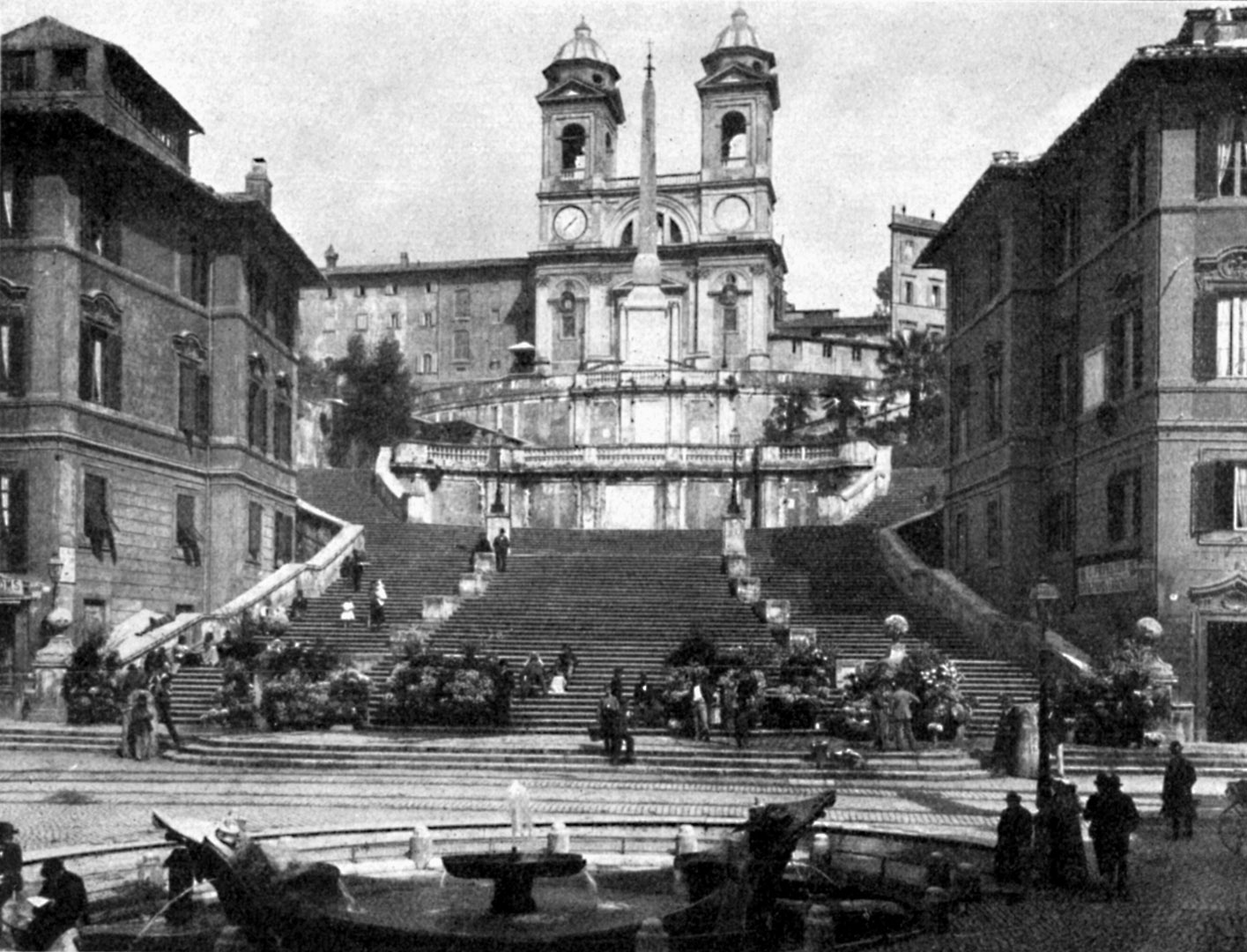
The Steps in a 1908 photograph
