= Gabriella Cecchi =

Italian pianist, music educator and composer

- Born: 3 November 1944 (age 81); Ricco del Golfo, La Spezia
- Education: Chigiana Music Academy
- Occupations: Pianist, music educator and composer

Gabriella Cecchi (born 3 November 1944) is an Italian pianist, music educator and composer. Cecchi taught music at the Italian State School and performed in a piano duo. She also worked as a music critic for the daily newspaper La Nazione and contributed to monthly magazines. Cicchi's music has been performed internationally and has been broadcast on Radio RaiTre. Cecchi was awarded the Athena prize in 1988. Cecchi is a co-founder of the Italian Composers Foundation.

== Life ==
Gabriella Cecchi was born on 3 November 1944 in Ricco del Golfo, La Spezia. She is an Italian pianist, music educator and composer. She began her study of music at the age of 16. She studied in Lucca, and learned composition with Franco Donatoni at the Chigiana Music Academy in Siena, where she also took courses in Renaissance music and music education. She graduated in 1970. She also studied at the Genoa conservatory, from 1974 to 1977, learning harmony and counterpoint. She has been a student of Brian Fernyhough, Francesco Pennisi and Fabio Vacchi.

After completing her studies, Cecchi worked as a music teacher and composer. She taught music at the Italian State School and performed in a piano duo for several years. She also worked as a music critic for the daily newspaper La Nazione and for monthly magazines. Her music includes solo pieces, chamber music and works for orchestra, and has been performed internationally and broadcast on Radio RaiTre. Her compositions have been published by Agenda and Edipan. She was a recipient of the Athena prize in 1988, and is a co-founder of the Italian Composers Foundation.

== Selected works ==
Cecchi composes solo pieces, chamber music and works for orchestra, often with experimental, multimedia and complex structures. Selected works include:

- Intersezioni for piano (1982)
- Assonanze for harpsichord (1984)
- Imagenes de la Argentina theater music (2005)
- Sères for string quartet (1984)
- Favoletta, instrumental
