= Giovanni Maria Cecchi =

Italian playwright

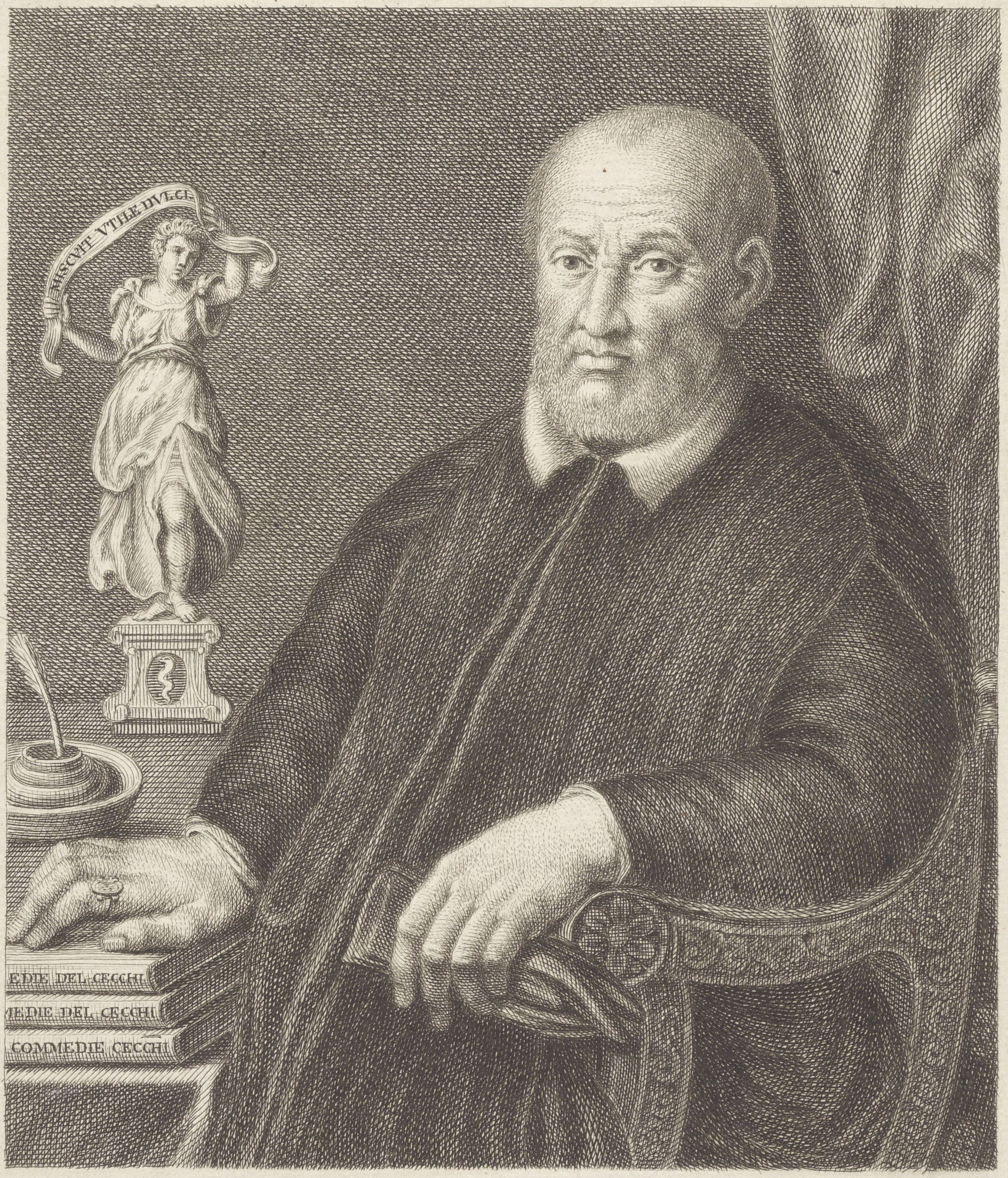
- Giovanni Maria Cecchi
- Born: 1518; Florence, Republic of Florence
- Died: 1587 (aged 68–69); San Martino a Gangalandi, Grand Duchy of Tuscany
- Occupations: Writer, notary, poet, playwright
- Movement: Renaissance

Giovanni Maria Cecchi (1518–1587) was an Italian poet, playwright, writer and notary, devoted to the Medici family. His plays were often classically inspired, although some were derived from current events. “Cecchi left in his comedies a treasure of spoken language, which nowadays enables us in a wonderful way to make ourselves acquainted with that age.”

== Biography ==
Giovan Maria Cecchi was born in Florence in 1518, to Ser Bartolomeo Cecchi and Ginevra Sannini. He was the rival of Bibbiena, Machiavelli, and Ariosto in portraiture of character and in liveliness of dialogue. A notary by profession, Cecchi completed twenty-one full-length erudite comedies, numerous secular farces, religious dramas, and intermezzi. Of his plays, 95 in number, but few have been printed. They are for the most part imitations of Plautus and Terence; the best of them are: Il Martello, La Stiava, and (the most famous of all) L'Assiuolo. He wrote also religious dramas; among them L'Esaltazione della Croce (1589), written in verse, derived from the Golden Legend, with a setting in Jerusalem at the time of warfare between Christians and infidel Persians, and accompanied by six elaborate intermezzi to express the drama's grandiosity.

According to Ernest Hatch Wilkins Cecchi “may fairly be called the first Italian playwright, in the sense that he was the first Italian writer whose literary activity was busily and almost exclusively dramatic. He wrote about twenty regular comedies, the earlier ones quite in the spirit of his Florentine predecessors, the later ones restrained by the influence of the Counter-Reformation. Some are free adaptations from Plautus or Terence; some are based on novelle; and some reflect current Florentine incident.”

Cecchi wrote among other things, the Contents of "Magistrates of Florence" (1562) and an institutional history of the Florentine State, a treatise on local history. He also composed farces and other comedies on religious subjects.

Giovan Maria Cecchi died at the age of 69 in Gangalandi in 1587, and was buried in the church of Santa Lucia.

== Works ==
- La Dote
- La Moglie
- Il Corredo
- La Stiava
- Il Donzello
- Gli Incantesimi
- Lo Spirito
- L'ammalata
- Il Servigiale
- La Macaria
- I Dissimili
- I Rivali
- L'Assiuolo. L'Assiuolo Eisenbichler summarises the plot: “The two youths, Giulio and Rinuccio, seduce and win the permanent affection of the two married ladies, Oretta and Violante, while Oretta's old husband tries without success to seduce the virtuous widow Anfrosina (Rinuccio's mother). When the servant Giorgetto notices that his machinations have been successful and that sexual encounters have either occurred or have been foiled as planned, he himself goes off to a brothel to gratify his senses, thus underscoring the nature of the other incidents.”
- Il Medico, reprinted 1585 as Il Diamante
- Le Pellegrine
- Le Cedole
- Gli Sciamiti
- Le Maschere
- I Contrassegni
- Il Debito

== Bibliography ==
- Radcliff-Umstead, Douglas (1986). Carnival Comedy and Sacred Play: The Renaissance Dramas of Giovan Maria Cecchi. University of Missouri Press.
- Radcliff-Umstead, Douglas (1975). "Cecchi and the Reconciliation of Theatrical Traditions". Comparative Drama. 9 (2): 156–175. doi:10.1353/cdr.1975.0025. JSTOR 41152667.
