= Antonio Cecchini =

Italian painter

Antonio Cecchini (born 1660) was an Italian painter of the Baroque period.

== Biography ==
This biography refers to Antonio Cecchini born in Pesaro, and a pupil of Giacomo Palma the Younger.

There appears to have been more than one painter of the same name, and the short biographical sketch by Lazzarini and Bechi may conflate different painters. They state in 1783 that a pupil of Palma, now living in Venice, had a few works in Pesaro, except Moses in the Nile in a private house.

Zannendreis, in his biographies of Veronese painters, mentions an Antonio Cecchini, or Zecchini, who had died after 1750, mentioned in a 1779 guide to Vicenza, who had painted the chapel of San Giuseppe in the Vicenza Cathedral and also for the church of Santa Maria Nuova, Vicenza.

Agostino Castellaci is said to have been initially a pupil of Cecchini di Pesaro.
