= Gaetano Vascellini =

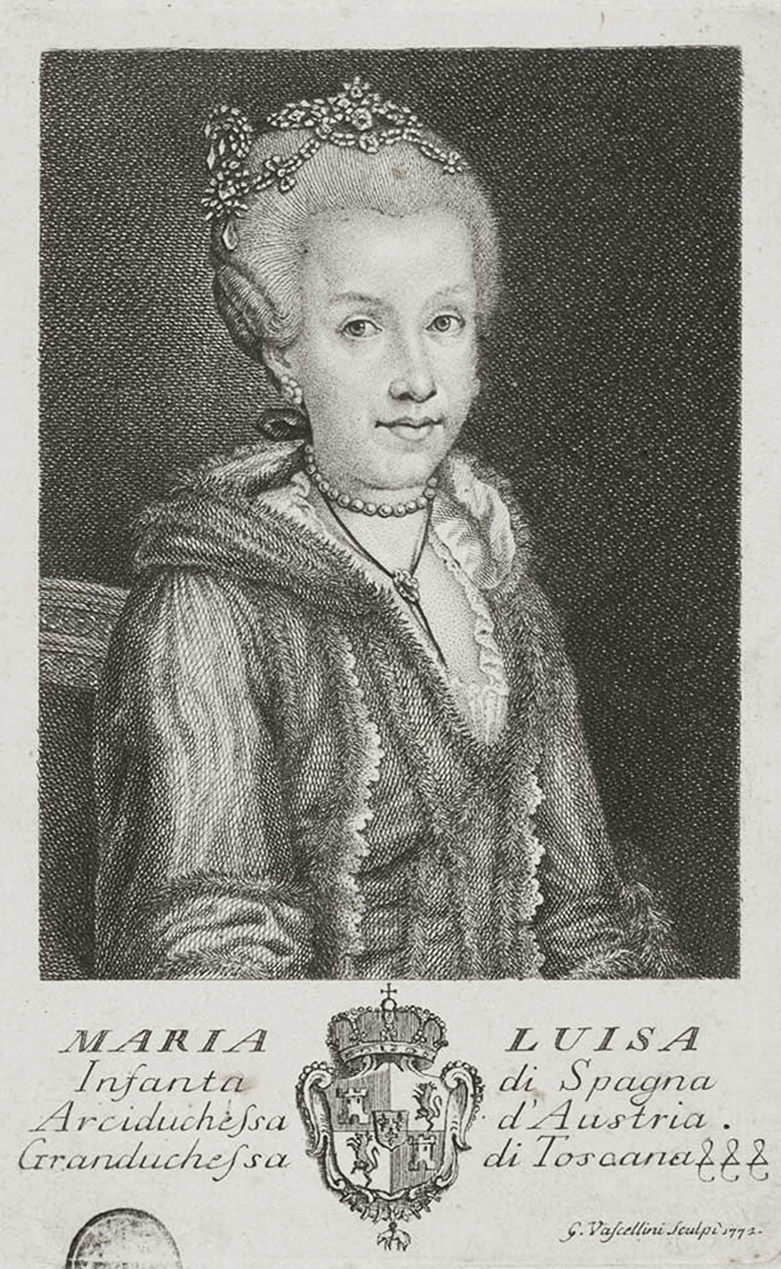
Line engraved Portrait of Maria Luisa of Spain by Vascellini

Gaetano Vascellini (1745 - 1805) was an Italian engraver, active in a neoclassical style in his native Florence, Region of Tuscany, Italy. He was prolific in engraving portraits of the illustrious persons of Florence, as well as local sculpture.
