= Arturo Checchi =

Italian painter (1886–1971)

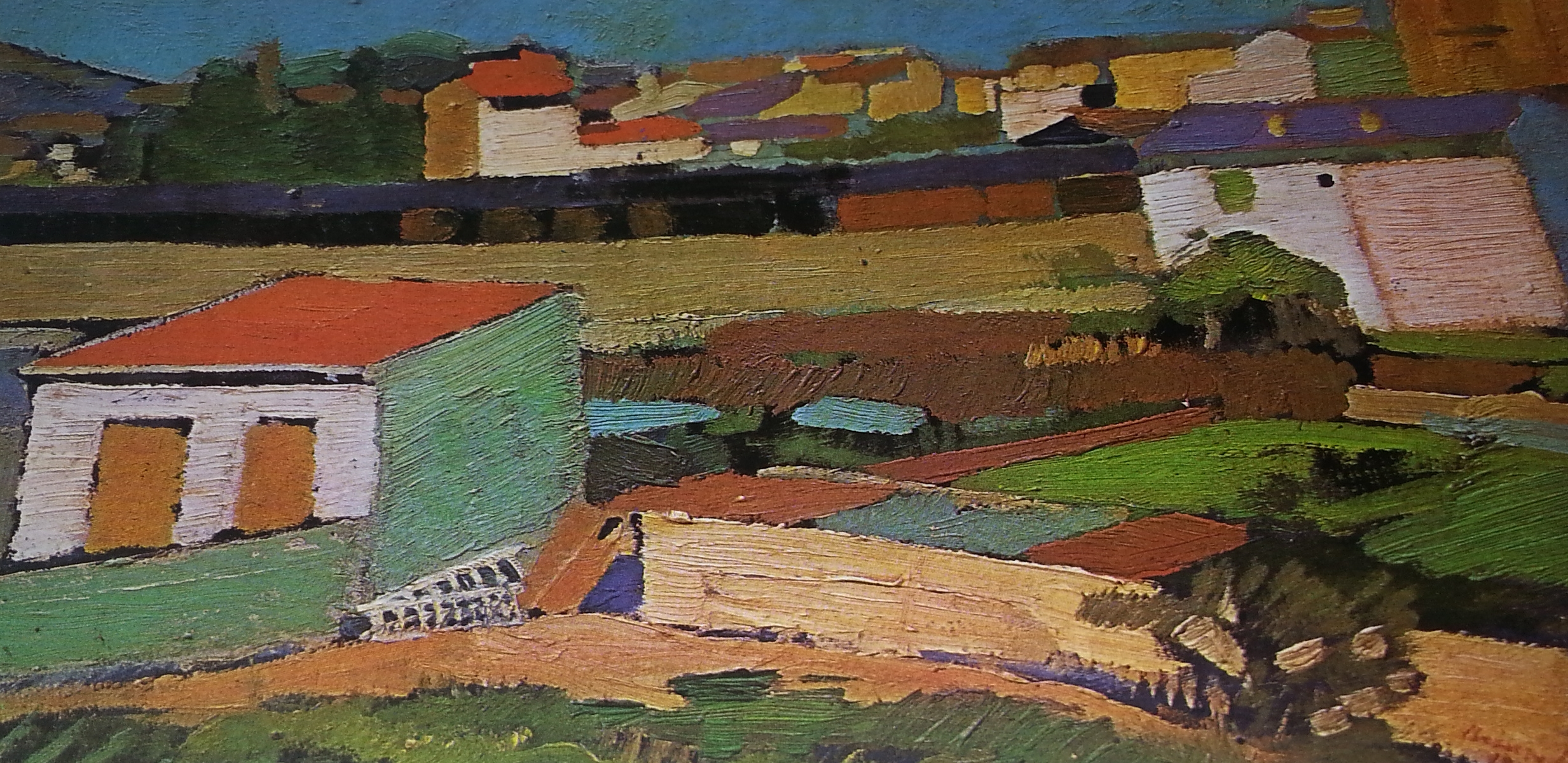
- Museum of Fucecchio
- Born: 17 June 1886; Fucecchio, Italy
- Died: 24 December 1971 (aged 85)
- Known for: Painting, sculpture
- Awards: 1927 Gold Medal at the International Graphic Palazzo Pitti, 1970 the gold medal by the International Centre for culture and the arts Montenero.

Arturo Checchi (1886 – 24 December 1971) was an Italian artist active in Tuscany. His paintings and sculptures are in an expressionist style.

== Biography ==
He was born in Fucecchio. In 1898, he began the study of drawing with a private tutor. In 1902, he enrolled for three years at the Academy of Fine Arts in Florence, studying under Alfonso De Carolis. After completing studies, he settled in Florence, working as a decorative painter until the outbreak of the First World War led him to return to Fucecchio.

Checchi exhibited at the Florentine Promotrice of 1911, 1913, and 1914, and at the Secessione Romana of 1914 and 1915. Works from the latter are now part of the collections of the Galleries of Modern Art at Florence and Rome.

In 1916, he had two personal shows at the Forte dei Marmi and at the Kursaal in Viareggio. In 1918, he participated in the exhibition Ars Florentina, and in 1920 and 1922 Promotrice of Florence. In 1920, he held an exhibition in Florence. In 1921, he presented three etchings at the Rome Biennale. In 1922, he exhibited at the "Quadrennial of Turin" and the Fiorentina spring. In 1924, he was honoured at the S. Ussi shows for the framework for Le Marie. In 1925, he moved to Perugia to teach at the Academy of Fine Arts.

Arturo Checchi was present in 1927 at the exhibition of the Black and White of New York. He exhibited in the Venice Biennale for the first time in 1928, and again in 1932, 1934, 1936 and 1940 with etchings, drawings and paintings. In 1939, he taught figure drawing at the Academy of Brera and in 1942 back to Academy of Florence as a lecturer until 1961. After the war, he continued to exhibit in Rome and Florence.

== Public works ==
Since 1975, two sculptures of his are exhibited at Vallombrosa: The siren (1932) and Girls in the sun (1935). In the foyer of the Teatro Morley of Perugia are displayed his works "violin" and "guitar". His works are also displayed at the Gallery of Modern Art in Turin and Milan, the Gallery of Modern Art in Prints and Drawings of the Uffizi and Rome, in national libraries in Florence and Paris, at the Ministry of Education and the Chamber of Commerce of Florence.

== Awards and honours ==
- 1927 Gold Medal at the International Graphic Palazzo Pitti in Florence.
- 1970, he was awarded the gold medal by the International Centre for culture and the arts in Montenero.

== Bibliography ==
- "The dishes broken by Arturo Checchi" by Piero Bargellini, New Editions Henry Vallecchi.
- "Arturo Checchi, the cards, the works and the life" by Federica De Paolis and Walter Scancarello, Bibliography and Information Publisher, Pontedera, 2013
