= Vjekoslav Rosenberg-Ružić =

Croatian Jewish composer (1870–1954)

- Born: 29 April 1870; Varaždin, Austro-Hungarian Empire, (now Croatia)
- Died: 16 February 1954 (aged 83); Zagreb, SFR Yugoslavia, (now Croatia)
- Occupations: Composer, conductor, musical pedagog

Vjekoslav Rosenberg-Ružić (April 29, 1870 – February 16, 1954) was a Croatian-Jewish composer, conductor and music educator.

== Biography ==
Rosenberg-Ružić was born in Varaždin as Alois Rosenberg on April 29, 1870. Later in life he added the Croatian variant of his surname, Ružić.

From early childhood he was in contact with the music, duo to a fact that his father Josip Rosenberg was a music teacher. Rosenberg-Ružić finished elementary and high school in his hometown. He studied violin, piano, and composition at the University of Music and Performing Arts, in Vienna. In 1891, Rosenberg-Ružić went to Split, where he taught music and led the choir in the local "Croatian singing society". Rosenberg-Ružić stayed in Split for 4 years, he then returned to Varaždin, where he was organist as in Split. In Varaždin, he continued educational work in the field of music, and started to compose.

By the Kingdom of Croatia-Slavonia provincial government decision in 1909, Rosenberg-Ružić became the main music teacher in Zagreb, and next year he became the head-master of the music school at the Croatian Music Institute.

== Popular compositions ==
- opera Kralj od Silbe (The King of Silba)
- opera Lijepa Klementinka (Lovely Clementine), unfinished
- Vilina
- Kameni svatovi, to a text of August Šenoa
- four piano sonatas (1891, 1900, 1915, 1920)
