= Stefano Cecchi =

Italian businessman

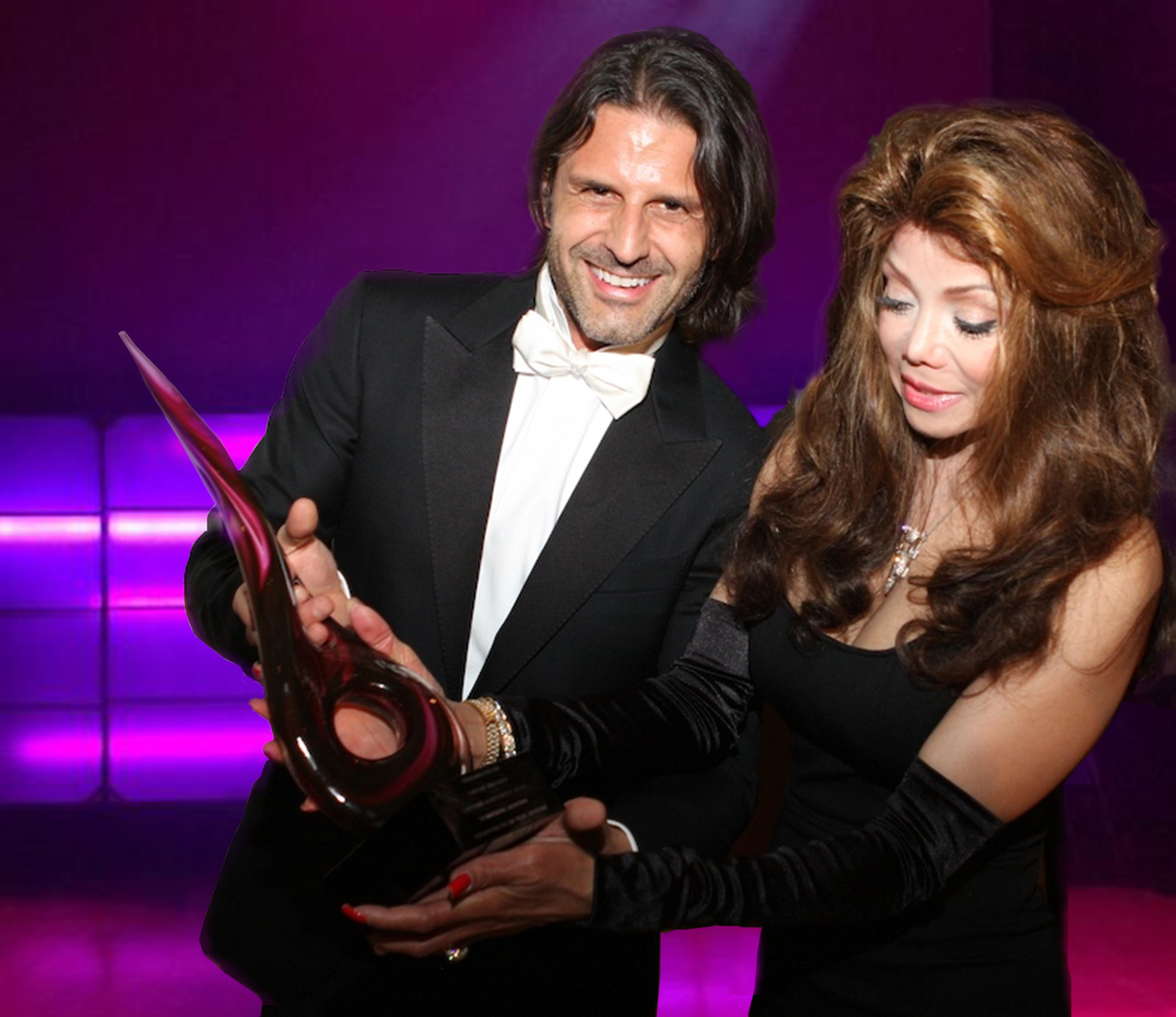
Cecchi and La Toya 2 in 2017

Stefano Cecchi (born Turin, Italy 1971) is an Italian investor, art collector and record producer.

== Personal life ==
Grandson of Gabriello Cecchi (1914-2000), an industrial entrepreneur awarded civil and military honours at both national and international level, including the titles of Knight and Commander, Stefano grew up between the United States and Great Britain, where he graduated in Economics in 1993.

== Career ==
In the 1990s he opened and developed fashion agencies in London (Wild and Next). In 1999 Cecchi founded the record label Stefano Cecchi Records, introducing the "Buddha Bar Collection" phenomenon to Italy and launching musical architecture projects for fashion brands and luxury items, (LVMH, Fendi, Tod’s, Swatch, Vogue, Zegna, Maserati and Diesel).

Between 2000 and 2010, he co-created several fashion brands (Hydrogen, Bikinifuxia and Melody Maker) and opened concept stores (San Carlo dal 1973).

In 2003 he joined the Board of the Torino Football Club.

In 2014, he rebranded and relaunched the Gelati Cecchi 1936 family company.

Thanks to his ability to predict new trends creating highly successful products, he was even mentioned in the Treccani Italian encyclopedia.

As of 2021, he is focused on asset-backed investments and has set up the London-based private equity fund "Fondo per l'Arte - FpA", which invests in modern and contemporary art with a particular interest in emerging artists.

Stefano Cecchi’s net worth is estimated to be over 130 million euros as of 2025, and he is the major shareholder in four British funds that hold important collections of contemporary art, including one of the world's best-known Arte Povera collections.

== Bibliography ==
In 2012, Cecchi published "10 years, 1000 projects", an anthology of his works.

In 2013, he published "Play, the autobiography of a dream".

As a contemporary art collectionist, Stefano Cecchi presented 5 catalogues: FP1 (2021), FP2 (2022), Transavanguardia Enchanted (2023), Forma 1 (2024) and Arte Povera e dintorni (2024). He has been writing a column in the Il Giornale dell’Arte under a pseudonym since 2023.

== Sport ==
Cecchi is also an ITF (International Tennis Federation) player in both over-35 and over-40 categories, specialised in men's doubles and mixed doubles. He won 14 international ITF tournaments, three medals in the European Championships, and played in the World Championships (with Fabrizio Gariglio), ranking second in the world and as a seeded player.
