= Ignacio Cechi =

Argentine footballer

Personal information
- Date of birth: 26 July 2001 (age 25)
- Place of birth: Guernica, Argentina
- Height: 1.79 m (5 ft 10 in)
- Position: Midfielder

Team information
- Current team: Tristán Suárez

Youth career
- Lanús

Senior career*
Years	Team	Apps	(Gls)
2020–2022	Lanús	6	(0)
2021	→ Mitre (loan)	12	(0)
2023	Liniers de Bahía Blanca	16	(0)
2024–	Tristán Suárez	24	(2)
- * Club domestic league appearances and goals as of 21 September 2024

Ignacio Cechi (born 26 July 2001) is an Argentine professional footballer who plays as a midfielder for Tristán Suárez.

== Career ==
Cechi joined the academy of Lanús at a young age. After training with the first-team in 2018, the midfielder was promoted into Luis Zubeldía's squad towards the end of 2020. He initially appeared in pre-season friendlies, notably scoring against Defensores de Belgrano, before making the substitute's bench for Copa de la Liga Profesional fixtures with Newell's Old Boys and Aldosivi in November and December; having penned pro terms in September. Cechi's senior debut arrived on 3 January 2021 in the same competition, as he replaced Matías Esquivel with sixteen minutes left of an eventual 1–1 away draw against Patronato.

== Style of play ==
Cechi is a versatile midfielder, capable of playing out wide or centrally.

== Career statistics ==
As of 4 January 2021.

Appearances and goals by club, season and competition
Club	Season	League			Cup		League Cup		Continental		Other		Total	
Club	Season	Division	Apps	Goals	Apps	Goals	Apps	Goals	Apps	Goals	Apps	Goals	Apps	Goals
Lanús	2020–21 (Note: Soccerway counts Copa de la Liga Profesional appearances as league appearances.)	Primera División	1	0	0	0	0	0	0	0	0	0	1	0
Career total			1	0	0	0	0	0	0	0	0	0	1	0
