= Gabriello Cecchi =

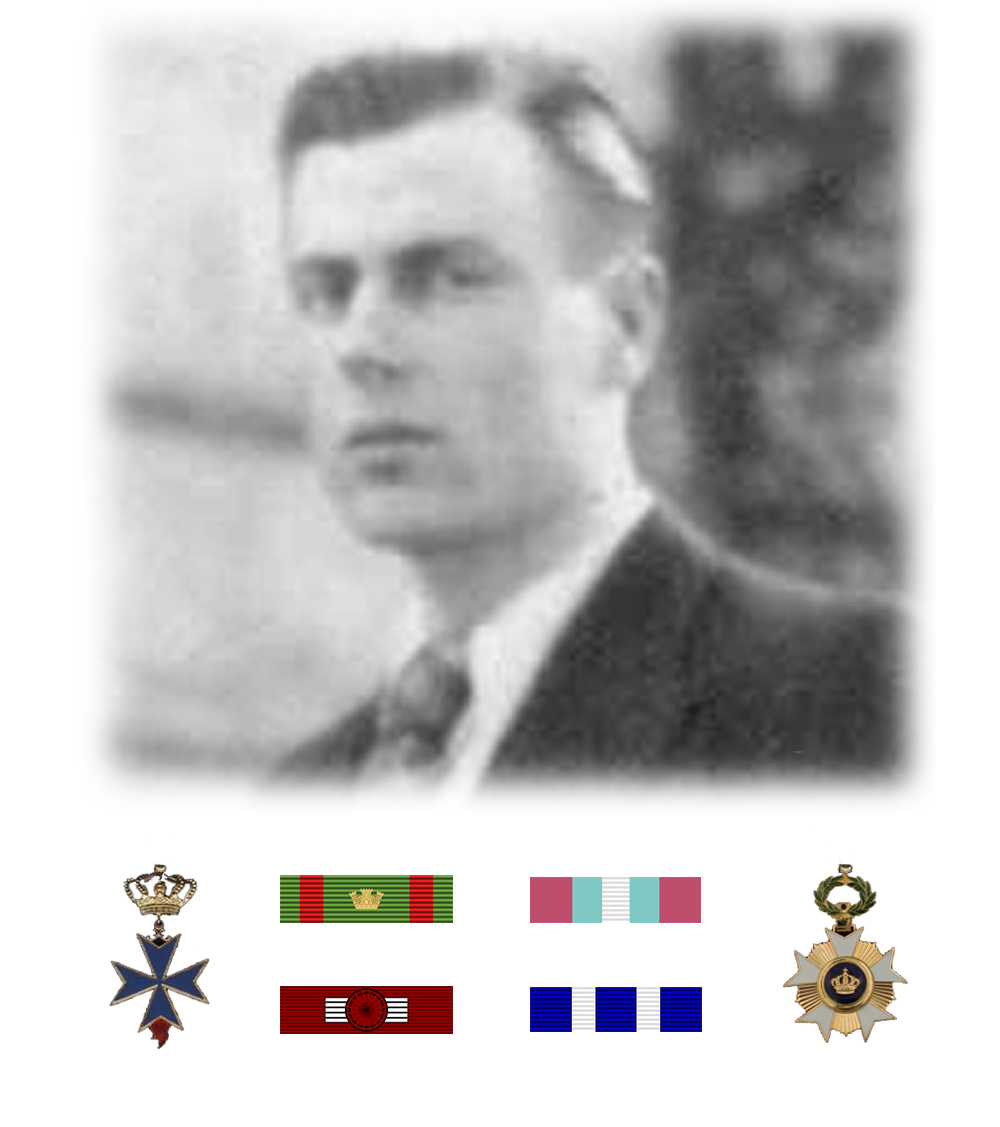
- Cecchi in 1939
- Born: c. 1914; Ponte Buggianese, Italy
- Died: 2000; Turin, Italy

Commander Gabriello Cecchi (c. 1914 - 2000) was an Italian entrepreneur in the gelato industry. He created the Gelati Cecchi brand in 1936 and later founded Cecchi Industries after the Second World War. He managed the company until 1973, when he sold it to the Italian group Barilla. Following the sale, he remained Honorary Chairman and Director within the group and at Motta-Nestlé until the 1990s. The brand was later relaunched by his grandson, Stefano Cecchi.

Cecchi was the patron of the Serie-A Pallacanestro Biella team and a co-founder of a Turin bank. He was a member of the International Brigades that fought Francisco Franco's Fascist army in Spain during the Spanish Civil War. Later, having returned to Italy, he became a member of the Garibaldi 77th assault brigade as part of the Italian Resistance.

== Honours ==
Cecchi was awarded several civil and military honours at both national and international level, in recognition of his entrepreneurial activity and his role during wartime. These include:

- Commander (Première Classe) of the Order of the Crown (Belgium)
- Commander of Merit of the Military Order of St. Bridget of Sweden
- Italian War Merit Cross
