= Cecco =

Cecco (pronounced [ˈtʃekko]) is a diminutive of the Italian masculine given name Francesco, also occurring as a surname. Notable people with the name include:

== Given name ==
- Cecco Angiolieri (c. 1260–c. 1312), Italian poet
- Cecco Bravo (1601–1661), Italian painter
- Cecco d'Ascoli (1257–1327), Italian encyclopaedist, physician and poet
- Cecco del Caravaggio (fl. 1610–1620s), Italian painter
- Cecco di Giorgio (1439–1501), Italian architect, engineer, painter, sculptor and writer
- Cecco di Pietro (c. 1330–c. 1402), Italian painter
- Cecco II Ordelaffi (c. 1300–1374), lord of Forlì
- Cecco (Peter Pan), one of Captain Hook's pirates from Peter Pan

== Surname ==
- Raffaele Cecco (born 1967), British video games developer
- Rubén Cecco (born 1983), Argentine footballer

== See also ==
- De Cecco, Italian company producing dried pasta, flour and other related food products
- Olavo Cecco Rigon Airport or Concórdia Airport (IATA: CCI, ICAO: SSCK), the airport serving Concórdia, Brazil
- Cecchi
- Checco
- Chicco (name)
