= Tomaso Cecchino =

Italian composer

Tomaso Cecchino (c. 1583 – 31 August 1644) was an Italian composer active in Croatia.

Cecchino was born in Soave. After attending the school of acolytes in Verona, he moved in 1603 to Dalmatia, where for a time he was in charge of the music in Split Cathedral. He held this post until 1607, and returned to it in 1613, probably at the invitation of Bishop Marcantonio de Dominis. In December 1614, he left Split to become director of music in Hvar Cathedral, where he remained for the rest of his life. In Hvar, he raised the standard of music to previously unattained heights.

Cecchino contributed significantly to the diffusion of the monodic style of music in Dalmatia. His works were known primarily in Germany and other countries of western Europe, where they appeared in several printed collections of music. The composer Michael Praetorius refers to him in the third volume of his Syntagma musicum.

== Sources ==
- Harvard Dictionary of Music
- Works by and about Tomaso Cecchino in the German National Library catalogue
- Free scores by Tomaso Cecchino at the International Music Score Library Project (IMSLP)
