= Ceccarelli =

Ceccarelli (pronounced [tʃekkaˈrɛlli]) is a common Italian surname, derived from the male given name Cecco.

== Geographical distribution ==
As of 2014, 85.8% of all known bearers of the surname Ceccarelli were residents of Italy (frequency 1:2,503), 4.9% of the United States (1:257,301), 3.4% of France (1:68,423), 2.0% of Argentina (1:74,207) and 1.4% of Brazil (1:513,850).

In Italy, the frequency of the surname was higher than the national average (1:2,503) in the following regions:

1. Umbria (1:336)
2. Lazio (1:589)
3. Tuscany (1:612)
4. Marche (1:846)
5. Emilia-Romagna (1:1,977)

== People ==
- Alfonso Ceccarelli (1532–1583), Italian physician and genealogist
- André "Dédé" Ceccarelli (born 1946), French jazz drummer
- Art Ceccarelli (1930–2012), American baseball player
- Benedetta Ceccarelli (born 1980), Italian track-and-field athlete
- Cecilia Ceccarelli, Italian astronomer
- Daniela Ceccarelli (born 1975), Italian alpine skier
- Dave Ceccarelli (born c. 1935), American former politician
- Domenico Ceccarelli (1905–1985), Italian boxer
- Edith Ceccarelli (1908–2024), American supercentenarian
- Fabio Ceccarelli, (born 1983) Italian footballer
- Francesco Ceccarelli (1752–1814), Italian soprano castrato singer
- Giampiero Ceccarelli (born 1948), Italian football manager and former footballer
- Giancarlo Ceccarelli (born 1956), retired Italian footballer
- Luca Ceccarelli (footballer, born 20 March 1983), Italian footballer
- Luca Ceccarelli (footballer, born 24 March 1983), Italian footballer
- Luigi Ceccarelli (born 1953), Italian composer
- Marc Ceccarelli (born 1968), American animator, director, producer and writer
- Naddo Ceccarelli (fl. 1330–1360), Italian painter
- Odoardo Ceccarelli (c. 1600–1668), Italian singer and composer
- Paolo Ceccarelli (born 1969), Canadian footballer
- Pietro Ceccarelli (born 1992), Italian rugby union player
- Samuele Ceccarelli (born 2000), Italian sprinter
- Sandra Ceccarelli (born 1967), Italian film actress
- Tommaso Ceccarelli (born 1992), Italian footballer
- Ugo Ceccarelli (1911–1940), Italian modern pentathlete

== See also ==
- Ceccarello
- Ceccaroli
