= 1996–97 Serie B =

Italian football league season

Serie B
- Season: 1996–97
- Promoted: Brescia (3rd title); Empoli; Lecce; Bari
- Relegated: Cosenza; Cesena; Palermo; Cremonese
- Matches: 380
- Goals: 852 (2.24 per match)
- Top goalscorer: (Italy) Davide Dionigi (24 goals)

Serie B 1996-97 team distribution

The Serie B 1996–97 was the sixty-fifth tournament of this competition played in Italy since its creation.

== Teams ==
Ravenna, Empoli, Lecce and Castel di Sangro had been promoted from Serie C, while Bari, Torino, Cremonese and Padova had been relegated from Serie A.

=== Personnel and sponsoring ===
Team	Manager	Kit manufacturer	Shirt sponsor
Bari	(Italy) Eugenio Fascetti	Adidas	Centro Europeo per la Preparazione Universitaria - CEPU
Brescia	(Italy) Edoardo Reja	ABM Sport	Brescialat
Castel di Sangro	(Italy) Osvaldo Jaconi	Pienne	Soviet Jeans
Cesena	(Italy) Giampiero Ceccarelli & (Italy) Corrado Benedetti	Adidas	Olidata
Chievo Verona	(Italy) Alberto Malesani	Biemme	Paluani
Cosenza	(Italy) Gianni De Biasi	Hummel	Cassa di Risparmio di Calabria e Lucania
Cremonese	(Italy) Nedo Sonetti	Uhlsport	Negroni Salumi
Empoli	(Italy) Luciano Spalletti	Erreà	Sammontana
Foggia	(Italy) Tarcisio Burgnich	Ennerre	None
Genoa	(Italy) Attilio Perotti	Erreà	Santàl
Lecce	(Italy) Gian Piero Ventura	Asics	Banca del Salento
Lucchese	(Italy) Gaetano Salvemini	Erreà	Cremlat
Padova	(Italy) Adriano Fedele	Diadora	Millionaire Market
Palermo	(Italy) Giampiero Vitali	Kappa	Giornale di Sicilia
Pescara	(Italy) Delio Rossi	Piemme	Gelati Gis
Ravenna	(Italy) Walter Novellino	Erreà	Cambiaso Risso & C. Assicurazioni
Reggina	(Italy) Vincenzo Guerini	Asics	Caffè Mauro
Salernitana	(Italy) Franco Varrella	Asics	Salumi Spiezia
Torino	(Italy) Lido Vieri	Kelme	SDA Express Courier
Venezia	(Italy) Gianfranco Bellotto	Virma	Emmezeta

== Final classification ==
Pos	Team	Pld	W	D	L	GF	GA	GD	Pts	Promotion or relegation
1	Brescia (P, C)	38	18	12	8	49	34	+15	66	Promotion to Serie A
2	Empoli (P)	38	17	13	8	45	34	+11	64	Promotion to Serie A
3	Lecce (P)	38	16	15	7	52	39	+13	63	Promotion to Serie A
4	Bari (P)	38	15	17	6	52	35	+17	62	Promotion to Serie A
5	Genoa	38	15	16	7	58	31	+27	61	
6	Pescara	38	14	12	12	50	38	+12	54	
7	Chievo	38	12	18	8	44	40	+4	54	
8	Ravenna (Note: 3 points deducted)	38	14	13	11	43	35	+8	52	
9	Torino	38	13	11	14	45	48	−3	50	
10	Reggina	38	12	13	13	40	43	−3	49	
11	Foggia	38	11	15	12	40	40	0	48	
12	Padova	38	11	15	12	41	43	−2	48	
13	Venezia	38	10	16	12	47	49	−2	46	
14	Lucchese	38	10	15	13	36	44	−8	45	
15	Salernitana	38	10	14	14	31	44	−13	44	
16	Castel di Sangro	38	12	8	18	29	45	−16	44	
17	Cosenza (R)	38	9	14	15	44	55	−11	41	Relegation to Serie C1
18	Cesena (R)	38	9	13	16	36	45	−9	40	Relegation to Serie C1
19	Palermo (R)	38	6	17	15	40	55	−15	35	Relegation to Serie C1
20	Cremonese (R)	38	7	11	20	30	55	−25	32	Relegation to Serie C1

Source: Almanacco Illustrato del Calcio - La Storia 1898-2004, Panini Edizioni, Modena, September 2005
Rules for classification: 1) points; 2) head-to-head points; 3) head-to-head goal difference; 4) head-to-head goals scored; 5) goal difference; 6) number of goals scored.
(C) Champions; (P) Promoted; (R) Relegated

== Results ==
Home \ Away	BAR	BRE	CDS	CES	CHV	COS	CRE	EMP	FOG	GEN	LCE	LUC	PAD	PAL	PES	RAV	REG	SAL	TOR	VEN
Bari	—	2–0	3–1	0–0	2–2	1–0	0–0	5–0	1–2	1–1	2–1	0–0	3–1	1–1	2–1	0–2	1–1	2–1	0–0	3–1
Brescia	2–0	—	3–1	1–1	0–0	2–0	3–1	0–0	2–1	1–2	0–0	1–0	3–1	1–1	2–0	0–0	1–0	2–0	0–0	3–1
Castel di Sangro	1–3	0–3	—	1–0	0–0	1–0	2–0	0–2	1–3	1–0	2–1	0–0	1–0	1–0	2–1	0–2	1–0	1–0	2–1	1–1
Cesena	0–2	1–3	1–0	—	1–1	2–2	4–0	2–1	2–2	1–1	0–3	1–1	2–3	1–1	1–1	2–0	3–1	2–1	1–1	1–1
Chievo	3–2	0–1	2–0	2–1	—	3–2	1–0	0–1	1–1	1–1	1–0	1–0	1–1	2–2	1–1	1–2	1–1	2–1	1–0	4–2
Cosenza	1–0	1–1	1–1	1–0	1–1	—	2–1	2–2	3–2	0–0	0–0	1–1	3–1	3–1	1–1	1–2	0–0	3–1	1–2	2–2
Cremonese	0–1	0–1	2–1	1–0	0–0	2–3	—	0–1	1–1	2–1	0–1	2–1	0–0	2–2	2–1	0–1	1–3	0–0	1–1	1–1
Empoli	2–1	0–0	1–1	2–0	2–1	4–0	0–0	—	3–0	2–1	1–1	0–1	2–1	3–1	0–0	1–4	1–0	2–0	2–0	3–2
Foggia	1–1	1–2	2–0	0–0	0–0	1–0	1–2	0–0	—	0–0	0–0	2–0	1–1	1–1	0–0	0–1	1–0	2–0	3–4	2–0
Genoa	0–0	4–0	1–3	1–0	1–1	3–0	3–0	3–1	0–1	—	2–0	1–1	2–1	4–1	1–1	3–0	1–2	1–1	3–0	3–0
Lecce	1–1	0–0	0–0	2–1	3–1	3–2	2–1	2–0	2–1	1–0	—	4–1	3–0	1–1	2–1	1–1	1–2	2–2	1–0	2–2
Lucchese	1–1	0–3	2–1	2–0	0–0	1–0	4–2	2–2	1–0	0–3	3–3	—	1–0	0–0	1–0	0–0	2–0	3–0	0–1	1–1
Padova	1–1	2–0	1–1	1–0	0–1	1–1	2–2	1–0	0–0	1–1	0–0	1–0	—	4–0	1–3	2–0	1–1	1–1	0–2	2–1
Palermo	1–2	3–2	3–0	0–1	3–1	1–3	1–1	0–1	0–1	1–1	2–3	1–1	1–3	—	0–0	2–0	1–1	1–1	1–0	2–2
Pescara	1–2	1–1	1–1	2–2	2–1	2–0	1–0	0–0	4–0	1–3	3–0	3–0	1–2	2–1	—	2–1	3–0	3–0	0–0	1–3
Ravenna	1–2	2–1	1–0	2–0	1–2	2–2	4–0	1–1	2–2	1–1	0–0	0–0	1–1	0–1	0–1	—	0–0	2–0	0–3	2–1
Reggina	2–2	1–1	1–0	0–1	1–1	1–0	1–0	1–0	0–3	0–0	1–2	4–2	1–0	0–0	2–3	1–1	—	3–0	2–1	1–1
Salernitana	0–0	4–1	1–0	1–0	2–2	0–0	1–0	1–1	2–0	1–1	1–1	1–0	0–0	0–0	1–0	1–0	1–3	—	2–1	1–0
Torino	2–2	0–2	1–0	1–0	1–0	3–1	0–1	0–1	1–1	3–3	4–2	2–2	1–2	2–1	0–2	0–4	4–2	1–0	—	1–1
Venezia	0–0	3–0	1–0	0–1	1–1	3–1	3–2	0–0	2–1	0–1	0–1	2–1	1–1	3–1	2–0	0–0	1–0	1–1	1–1	—

Source: Almanacco Illustrato del Calcio - La Storia 1898-2004, Panini Edizioni, Modena, September 2005
Legend: Blue = home team win; Yellow = draw; Red = away team win.

== Attendances ==
#	Club	Average
1	Salernitana	18,447
2	Lecce	13,476
3	Torino	13,461
4	Genoa	13,084
5	Palermo	12,749
6	Bari	11,462
7	Pescara	8,529
8	Padova	7,866
9	Brescia	7,687
10	Reggina	6,737
11	Ravenna	6,010
12	Cesena	5,761
13	Foggia	5,498
14	Empoli	5,404
15	Chievo	5,156
16	Cosenza	5,085
17	Lucchese	4,744
18	Venezia	4,454
19	Castel de Sangro	3,771
20	Cremonese	3,340
