= Ceccaroli =

Ceccaroli (pronounced [tʃekkaˈrɔːli]) is an Italian surname derived from the male given name Cecco. Notable people with the surname include:

- Luca Ceccaroli (born 1995), Sammarinese footballer
- Mattia Ceccaroli (born 1999), Sammarinese footballer

== See also ==
- Ceccarelli
- Ceccaroni
