= Ceccherini =

Ceccherini (pronounced [tʃekkeˈriːni]) is an Italian surname derived from the male given name Cecco. Notable people with the surname include:

- Andrea Ceccherini (born 1974), Italian civic leader
- Federico Ceccherini (born 1992), Italian footballer
- Giuseppe Ceccherini (1829–1899), Italian composer
- Massimo Ceccherini (born 1965), Italian actor, comedian and film director
- Sante Ceccherini (1863–1932), Italian fencer
- Silvano Ceccherini (1915–1974), Italian anarchist and writer
- Tito Ceccherini (born 1973), Italian orchestra conductor

== See also ==
- Ceccarini
