= Marc-Olivier Strauss-Kahn =

French central banker (born 1954)

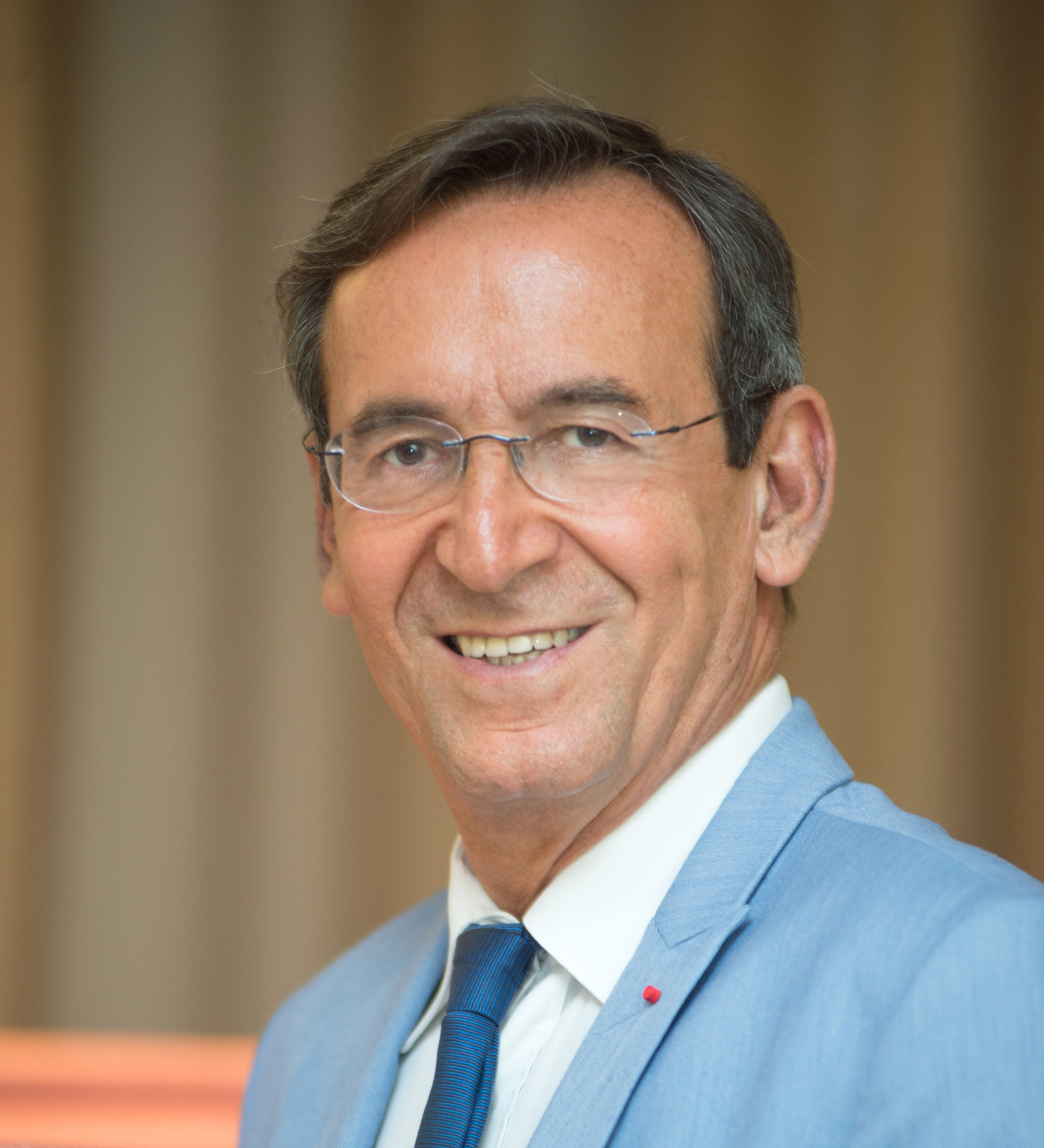

Director General at the Bank of France

Personal details
- Born: 10 March 1954 (age 72) Agadir, Morocco
- Education: University of Chicago; Economics

Marc-Olivier Strauss-Kahn (French pronunciation: [mɑːkstʁos kan]; born 10 March 1954) is a French central banker and international economist whose career began at the French central bank, Banque de France (BDF), in 1978. He has twice been the Chief Economist of the French central bank. In 2017, Governor of Banque de France François Villeroy de Galhau named him Director General, Governor's Special Advisor.

== Career ==
Early in his career, he was one of the five members of the "Economic Unit" created by the Delors Plan (1990) to serve under the aegis of the Bank for International Settlements (BIS) in Basel, Switzerland. It was recognized as the beginning of the future European Monetary Institute (1994) and then the European Central Bank (1998).

In the context of the expanding and globalizing Eurozone, according to the European Central Bank, Strauss-Kahn focused on how to facilitate enhanced international cooperation as the French Member or Alternate in contributing to the creation of the euro as well as global cooperation and good practices. The French magazine REFLETS featured his views on Banque de France, listing his participation in the Group of Seven (G7) and Group of Twenty (G20). He was Alternate Member in the Bank for International Settlements (BIS) Board from 1999 to 2008, and 2012–2017.

In 2012, he was appointed Chairman of the Steering Committee and Scientific Council of an educational museum project to educate youth and newcomers about money, the euro and the economy, called City of Economics and Money (fr. Cité de l'économie et de la monnaie), now called Citéco.

== Honors ==
Strauss-Kahn was named Chevalier (Knight) of The Legion of Honor in 2008, and elevated to Officer in 2017.

== Publications ==
Strauss-Kahn has published economic articles on money demand, productivity, price inertia, regional integration, and sovereign debt.

- Jean-Claude Chouraqui & Michael Driscoll & Marc-Olivier Strauss-Kahn, 1988. "The Effects of Monetary Policy on the Real Sector: An Overview of Empirical Evidence for Selected OECD Economies," OECD Economics Department Working Papers 51, OECD Publishing.
- Christian Bordes, Michael Driscoll, Marc-Olivier Strauss-Kahn, 1989. "Price Inertia and Nominal Aggregate Demand in Major European Countries," Discussion Papers (REL - Recherches Economiques de Louvain) 1989021, Université catholique de Louvain, Institut de Recherches Economiques et Sociales (IRES).
- Monticelli, Carlo & Strauss-Kahn, Marc-Olivier, 1993. "European Integration and the Demand for Broad Money," The Manchester School of Economic & Social Studies, University of Manchester, vol. 61(4), pages 345–366, December.
- Cette, G. & Strauss-Kahn, M-O., 2003. "Productivité horaire et PIB par tête aux États-Unis et en France — Comparaisons et recommandations," Bulletin de la Banque de France, Banque de France, issue 120, pages 39–58.
- Sa, S. & Bonzom, P. & Strauss-Kahn, M-O., 2005. "Interaction entre dimensions économique et institutionnelle de l’intégration régionale : l’expérience européenne," Bulletin de la Banque de France, Banque de France, issue 142, pages 41–59

== Family ==
His older brother is French politician Dominique Gaston André Strauss-Kahn, and he has a younger sister, Valérie Corinne. His father was Gilbert Strauss-Kahn (1918–1992), and his mother was Jacqueline Fellus (1919–2006).
