= Alberto Cavasin =

Italian footballer (born 1956)

Personal information
- Date of birth: 9 January 1956 (age 70)
- Place of birth: Treviso, Italy
- Position: Right back

Youth career
- 1970–1973: Silea

Senior career*
Years	Team	Apps	(Gls)
1973–1976	Treviso		
1976–1977	Avellino		
1977–1978	Atalanta		
1978–1981	SPAL		
1981–1982	Verona		
1982–1983	Catanzaro		
1983–1986	Bari		
1986–1988	Cesena		
1988–1990	Padova		

International career
1973–1974	Italy "Juniores"		
- Italy C

Managerial career
- 1990: Padova (youth team)
- 1990: Treviso
- 1991–1993: Trento
- 1993–1994: Fano
- 1994–1995: Ravenna
- 1995–1996: Gualdo
- 1996–1998: Fiorenzuola
- 1998–1999: Cesena
- 1999–2002: Lecce
- 2002–2004: Fiorentina
- 2005: Brescia
- 2005–2006: Treviso
- 2007: Messina
- 2007–2008: Frosinone
- 2009: Brescia
- 2009–2010: Bellinzona
- 2011: Sampdoria
- 2016: Leyton Orient
- 2017–2018: Santarcangelo
- 2021–2022: Barisardo
- * Club domestic league appearances and goals

Alberto Cavasin (born 9 January 1956) is an Italian football manager and former player.

== Playing career ==
Cavasin, a right back, started his professional career in 1973 for Treviso; he then played for a number of Serie A, B and C clubs, with some success. He retired in 1990.

== Managerial career ==
After a few months as Allievi Nazionali coach for Calcio Padova, Cavasin became coach of Treviso for the 1990–91 season, to be sacked soon after. After a number of season at the helm of several Serie C clubs, Cavasin became coach of last-placed Serie B club A.C. Cesena in 1998, as a replacement for Corrado Benedetti, and led the team to keep its place in the league. In 1999, he became coach of U.S. Lecce of Serie A, and led the club to two good seasons, before to be fired in early 2002. He then coached Serie C2 club Florentia Viola (then Fiorentina) in 2002, as replacement for Pietro Vierchowod, to be sacked in 2004. Successively he also coached minor Serie A teams such as Brescia and Treviso with little success.

He became coach of Messina on 30 January 2007, as replacement for Bruno Giordano; he was however sacked about two months later, on 2 April, following a 2–0 defeat to Cagliari. On 22 June 2007, he was announced as the new Frosinone boss, leading them to a mid-table finish in the club's second Serie B campaign. On 5 June 2008, Frosinone announced it had parted company with Alberto Cavasin.

On 20 May 2009, he completed a comeback at Brescia, replacing Nedo Sonetti as head coach for the remaining two games of the 2008–09 Serie B regular season, with the aim to lead the rondinelle into the promotion playoffs. After being sacked by Brescia, on 12 November 2009 he became the manager of AC Bellinzona, a Swiss Super League team. On 2 April 2010, Bellinzona fired the Italian trainer, formerly he coaching Lecce, Fiorentina and Brescia.

On 7 March 2011, he was named head coach of UC Sampdoria, replacing Domenico Di Carlo for the remainder of the 2010–11 Serie A and was ultimately relegated to Serie B with the team. In October 2016 he took over at the Football League Two side Leyton Orient. He was dismissed from his role on 23 November 2016 after ten games in charge with a record of two wins and eight defeats.

He returned to work in Italy in December 2017, as head coach of Serie C club Santarcangelo. He was however dismissed in March 2018 due to poor results.

After three years of inactivity, in August 2021 Cavasin accepted to become the new head coach of Barisardo, a small Sardinian club playing in the Prima Categoria regional amateur league (seventh level of Italian football). He left Barisardo after one season, where he guided the small Sardinian club to win the league.

== Honours ==
=== Coach ===
Individual

- Panchina d'Oro: 1999–2000
