= 1996–97 US Cremonese season =

Cremonese
1996–97 season
- Chairman: Domenico Luzzara
- Manager: Fausto Silipo (until 10 November); Nedo Sonetti (from 10 November)
- Stadium: Stadio Giovanni Zini
- Serie B: 20th (relegated)
- Coppa Italia
- Top goalscorer: League: Walter Mirabelli (8); All: Walter Mirabelli (11)
- Biggest defeat: Ravenna 4–0 Cremonese; Cesena 4–0 Cremonese

The 1996–97 season was the 94th season in existence of Cremonese and the club's first season back in the top flight of Italian football. In addition to the domestic league, Cremonese participated in this season's edition of the Coppa Italia. The season covered the period from 1 July 1996 to 30 June 1997. The team was relegated for the second season in a row.

== Competitions ==
=== Overview ===
Competition	First match	Last match	Starting round	Final position	Record							
Competition	First match	Last match	Starting round	Final position	Pld	W	D	L	GF	GA	GD	Win %
Serie B	8 September 1996	15 June 1997	Matchday 1	20th	38	7	11	20	30	55	−25	18.42
Coppa Italia	24 August 1996	26 November 1996	Preliminary round	Quarter-finals	5	2	1	2	8	9	−1	40.00
Total					43	9	12	22	38	64	−26	20.93

Source: Competitions

=== Serie B ===
==== League table ====
Pos	Team	Pld	W	D	L	GF	GA	GD	Pts	Promotion or relegation
16	Castel di Sangro	38	12	8	18	29	45	−16	44	
17	Cosenza (R)	38	9	14	15	44	55	−11	41	Relegation to Serie C1
18	Cesena (R)	38	9	13	16	36	45	−9	40	Relegation to Serie C1
19	Palermo (R)	38	6	17	15	40	55	−15	35	Relegation to Serie C1
20	Cremonese (R)	38	7	11	20	30	55	−25	32	Relegation to Serie C1

Source: Almanacco Illustrato del Calcio - La Storia 1898-2004, Panini Edizioni, Modena, September 2005
Rules for classification: 1) points; 2) head-to-head points; 3) head-to-head goal difference; 4) head-to-head goals scored; 5) goal difference; 6) number of goals scored.
(R) Relegated

==== Results by round ====
Round	1	2	3	4	5	6	7	8	9	10	11	12	13	14	15	16	17	18	19	20	21	22	23	24	25	26	27	28	29	30	31	32	33	34	35	36	37	38
Ground	A	H	A	H	A	H	A	H	A	A	H	A	H	H	A	H	A	H	A	H	A	H	A	H	A	H	A	H	H	A	H	A	A	H	A	H	A	H
Result	L	W	L	L	L	D	L	L	L	W	L	D	D	W	D	D	L	W	D	D	L	W	L	D	D	W	L	L	D	L	L	W	L	D	L	L	L	L
Position																																						

Source: Serie B
A = Away; H = Home; W = Win; D = Draw; L = Loss

==== Matches ====
Win Draw Loss

8 September 1996 1	Chievo	1–0	Cremonese	Verona
CEST (UTC+2)

14 September 1996 2	Cremonese	2–1	Genoa	Cremona
CEST (UTC+2)				Stadium: Stadio Giovanni Zini

22 September 1996 3	Castel di Sangro	2–0	Cremonese	Castel di Sangro
CEST (UTC+2)

29 September 1996 4	Cremonese	0–1	Ravenna	Cremona
CEST (UTC+2)				Stadium: Stadio Giovanni Zini

6 October 1996 5	Salernitana	1–0	Cremonese	Salerno
CEST (UTC+2)

13 October 1996 6	Cremonese	0–0	Padova	Cremona
CEST (UTC+2)				Stadium: Stadio Giovanni Zini

20 October 1996 7	Pescara	1–0	Cremonese	Pescara
CEST (UTC+2)

27 October 1996 8	Cremonese	0–1	Lecce	Cremona
CEST (UTC+2)				Stadium: Stadio Giovanni Zini

3 November 1996 9	Brescia	3–1	Cremonese	Brescia
CET (UTC+1)

9 November 1996 10	Torino	0–1	Cremonese	Turin
CET (UTC+1)

24 November 1996 11	Cremonese	2–3	Cosenza	Cremona
CET (UTC+1)				Stadium: Stadio Giovanni Zini

30 November 1996 12	Bari	0–0	Cremonese	Bari
CET (UTC+1)

8 December 1996 13	Cremonese	1–1	Foggia	Cremona
CET (UTC+1)				Stadium: Stadio Giovanni Zini

15 December 1996 14	Cremonese	1–0	Cesena	Cremona
CET (UTC+1)				Stadium: Stadio Giovanni Zini

22 December 1996 15	Palermo	1–1	Cremonese	Palermo
CET (UTC+1)

5 January 1997 16	Cremonese	1–1	Venezia	Cremona
CET (UTC+1)				Stadium: Stadio Giovanni Zini

12 January 1997 17	Reggina	1–0	Cremonese	Reggio Calabria
CET (UTC+1)

19 January 1997 18	Cremonese	2–1	Lucchese	Cremona
CET (UTC+1)				Stadium: Stadio Giovanni Zini

26 January 1997 19	Empoli	0–0	Cremonese	Empoli
CET (UTC+1)

2 February 1997 20	Cremonese	0–0	Chievo	Cremona
CET (UTC+1)				Stadium: Stadio Giovanni Zini

9 February 1997 21	Genoa	3–0	Cremonese	Genoa
CET (UTC+1)

16 February 1997 22	Cremonese	2–1	Castel di Sangro	Cremona
CET (UTC+1)				Stadium: Stadio Giovanni Zini

23 February 1997 23	Ravenna	4–0	Cremonese	Ravenna
CET (UTC+1)

2 March 1997 24	Cremonese	0–0	Salernitana	Cremona
CET (UTC+1)				Stadium: Stadio Giovanni Zini

8 March 1997 25	Padova	2–2	Cremonese	Padua
CET (UTC+1)

23 March 1997 26	Cremonese	2–1	Pescara	Cremona
CET (UTC+1)				Stadium: Stadio Giovanni Zini

29 March 1997 27	Lecce	2–1	Cremonese	Lecce
CET (UTC+1)

6 April 1997 28	Cremonese	0–1	Brescia	Cremona
CEST (UTC+2)				Stadium: Stadio Giovanni Zini

12 April 1997 29	Cremonese	1–1	Torino	Cremona
CEST (UTC+2)				Stadium: Stadio Giovanni Zini

20 April 1997 30	Cosenza	2–1	Cremonese	Cosenza
CEST (UTC+2)

27 April 1997 31	Cremonese	0–1	Bari	Cremona
CEST (UTC+2)				Stadium: Stadio Giovanni Zini

4 May 1997 32	Foggia	1–2	Cremonese	Foggia
CEST (UTC+2)

11 May 1997 33	Cesena	4–0	Cremonese	Cesena
CEST (UTC+2)

15 May 1997 34	Cremonese	2–2	Palermo	Cremona
CEST (UTC+2)				Stadium: Stadio Giovanni Zini

18 May 1997 35	Venezia	3–2	Cremonese	Venice
CEST (UTC+2)

25 May 1997 36	Cremonese	1–3	Reggina	Cremona
CEST (UTC+2)				Stadium: Stadio Giovanni Zini

8 June 1997 37	Lucchese	4–2	Cremonese	Lucca
CEST (UTC+2)

15 June 1997 38	Cremonese	0–1	Empoli	Cremona
CEST (UTC+2)				Stadium: Stadio Giovanni Zini

=== Coppa Italia ===
24 August 1996 Preliminary round	Como	2–2 (a.e.t.) (4–5 p)	Cremonese	Como
CEST (UTC+2)				Stadium: Stadio Giuseppe Sinigaglia

28 August 1996 Final phase	Cremonese	2–1	Udinese	Cremona
CEST (UTC+2)				Stadium: Stadio Giovanni Zini

23 October 1996 Round of 16	Cesena	1–2	Cremonese	Cesena
CEST (UTC+2)				Stadium: Stadio Dino Manuzzi

13 November 1996 Quarter-finals; First leg	Cremonese	1–3	Bologna	Cremona
CET (UTC+1)				Stadium: Stadio Giovanni Zini

26 November 1996 Quarter-finals; Second leg	Bologna	2–1 (5–2 agg.)	Cremonese	Bologna
CET (UTC+1)				Stadium: Stadio Renato Dall'Ara
