= Charles de Venasque-Ferriol =

- Born: Cavaillon, France
- Education: University of Avignon
- Occupation: Genealogist
- Spouse: Paula Bressan
- Children: 1 son, 2 daughters
- Parent(s): Jean-Baptiste Ferriolis; Auriane de Saint-Maurice

Charles de Venasque-Ferriol was a French genealogist and courtier in Monaco during the seventeenth century. He was the secretary of Honoré II, Prince of Monaco and the author of several books, one of which falsely suggested the House of Grimaldi was related to Charles Martel.

== Early life ==
Charles de Venasque-Ferriol was born in Cavaillon. His father, Jean-Baptiste Ferriolis, was the Lord of Venasque and Saint-Didier. His mother was Auriane de Saint-Maurice.

Venasque-Ferriol received a doctorate from the University of Avignon in 1633.

== Career ==
Venasque-Ferriol was a genealogist and courtier in Monaco. He was in the Monegasque retinue when Honoré II, Prince of Monaco visited the French Court from the autumn of 1642 to the Spring of 1643. With Hyacinthe de Bressan, he subsequently co-authored an article about the visit entitled Description of Prince Honoré II of Monaco’s visit to the French court (October 1646–May 1647) . In 1943, shortly after the death of Cardinal Richelieu, Venasque-Ferriol authored Temple de Mémoire du grand Richelieu, a biography of Cardinal Richelieu, in 1643. In March of the same year, he published La Liberté glorieuse de Monaco. In it, he stressed the special relationship between Monaco and France.

Venasque-Ferriol served as the secretary of Honoré II, Prince of Monaco from 1644 to 1653. In 1647, he authored Genealogica et Historica Grimaldœ Gentis arbor. In it, he falsely suggested the House of Grimaldi was related to the French royal family. The book claims that the Grimaldis descend from the brother of Charles Martel (and thus the great-granduncle of Charlemagne). However, Venasque-Ferriol used Alfonso Ceccarelli's discredited genealogical study as one of his main sources.

According to Louis Moréri, Venasque-Ferriol also did a genealogical study of the Bec Crespin family.

Venasque-Ferriol composed a ballet for the Monegasque Court entitled Les entretiens de Diane et d’Apollon. It was performed in the Prince's Palace of Monaco on February 12, 1654.

== Personal life and death ==
Venasque-Ferriol married Paula Bressan on July 15, 1646. They had one son and two daughters. His wife outlived him, dying in 1674.
