= Ceccarini =

Ceccarini (pronounced [tʃekkaˈriːni]) is an Italian surname derived from the male given name Cecco. Notable people with the surname include:

- Andrea Ceccarini (born 1964), Italian swimmer
- Antonio Ceccarini (1949–2015), Italian football manager and former player
- Lucio Ceccarini (1930–2009), Italian water polo player
- Matteo Ceccarini (born 1972), Italian DJ, composer and sound designer
- Piero Ceccarini (born 1953), Italian football referee
- Sebastiano Ceccarini (1703–1783), Italian painter

== See also ==
- Ceccaroni
- Ceccherini
