= Gracques =

French think tank

- Formation: 2007
- Type: Public Policy Think Tank
- Website: www.lesgracques.fr

The Gracques, named after the Gracchi brothers, are a French Social liberal think-tank.

During the French presidential election of 2007, a group of former high-ranking civil servants published an open letter titled Merci, François ! ("Thank you, François!"), and signed "Les Gracques", in Le Point of 22 March 2007. The manifesto praised François Bayrou, advocated a Social democrat approach for the Socialist Party, and an alignment of the French political spectrum with that of the "great nations of Europe and Northern America", meaning an alliance between the Left and the Centre against the Right-wing.

After the election, the signatories and their sympathisers founded a thinktank, as a Voluntary association (association loi de 1901), and published a formal manifesto.

The Gracques notably define themselves as democratic, liberal, desegregationist, pro-labour, favourable toward state regulation of the economy, favourable toward wealth redistribution, pro-ecology, pro-European, and internationalist.

The original members have been rumoured to include Jean-Pierre Jouyet, Denis Olivennes, Roger Godino, Matthieu Pigasse, Ariane Obolensky, Bernard Spitz, Guillaume Hannezo, François Villeroy de Galhau, Gilles de Margerie. As of late 2008, the association claims about 770 members. The organisation's Summer Universities in 2007 and 2008 have featured such speakers as Michel Rocard, Anthony Giddens, Walter Veltroni, Peter Mandelson and François Chérèque.

== Sources and references ==
- Official website
