= Osservatorio for independent thinking =

Organization based in Florence, Italy

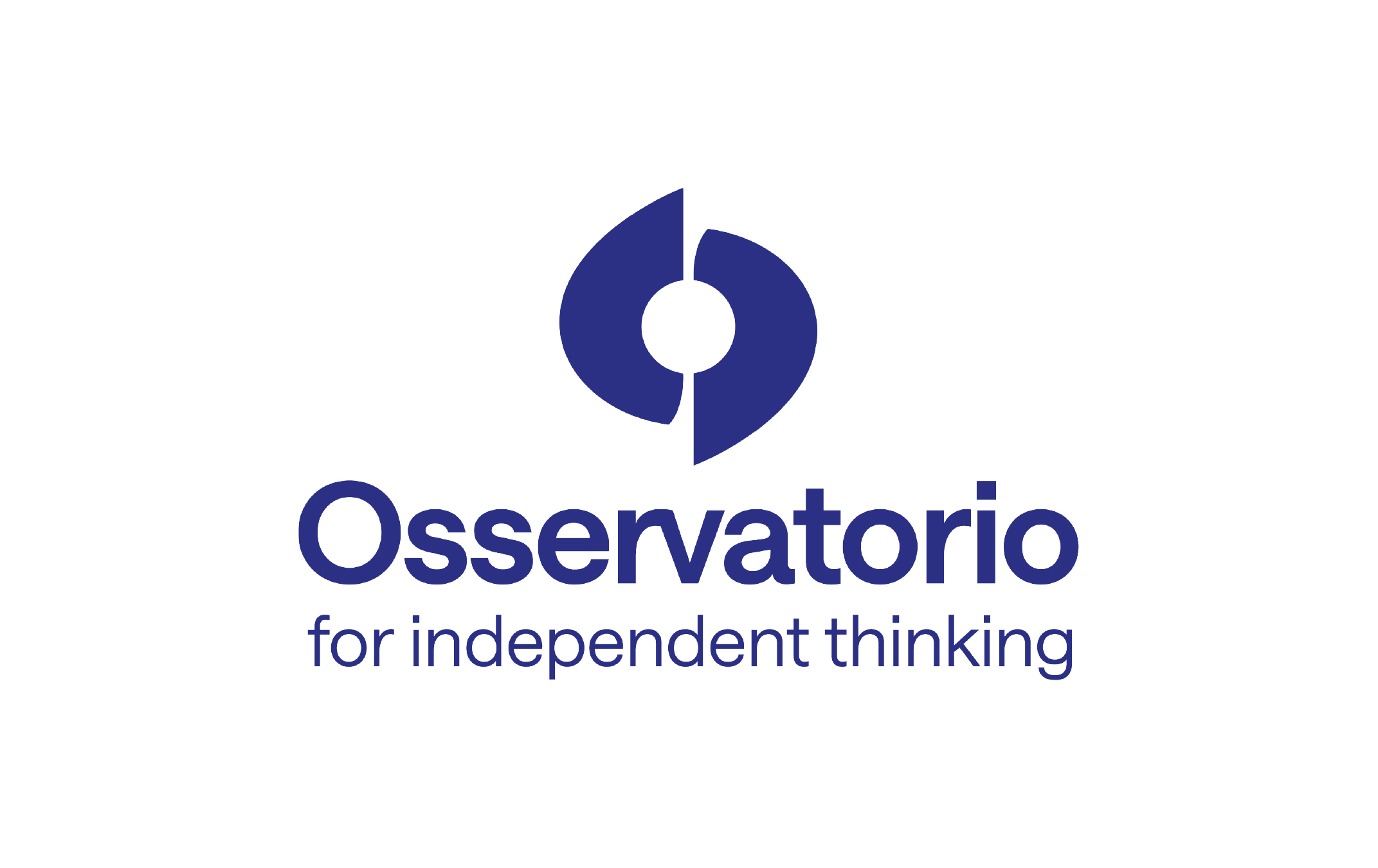
- Formation: June 5, 2000
- Type: nonprofit organization
- Headquarters: Florence, Italy
- Fields: Critical thinking, civic education, education, media literacy, economic-financial literacy, digital literacy
- Key people: Andrea Ceccherini (President)
- Website: www.osservatorionline.it/en/

Osservatorio for independent thinking (formerly Osservatorio Permanente Giovani-Editori) is an Italian nonprofit organization based in Florence, Italy whose aim is to develop critical thinking of younger generations through its leadership in media education, economic-financial literacy, and quality information in the classroom. Officially founded on June 5, 2000, it promotes and organizes events, educational programs, books and research on the topics of civility and critical thinking, with millions of students and tens of thousands of teachers, primarily from secondary schools, involved over the years.

Chaired and founded by Andrea Ceccherini, the Osservatorio has developed numerous projects over the years. Notable among these are “Il Quotidiano in Classe” (“Quality Information in the Classroom”, a media literacy project designed to develop critical thinking), “Young Factor” (an economic and financial literacy project), “Technology - Digital Literacy” (focused on enhancing digital knowledge awareness), “E-Project” (an initiative related to ecological literacy), and “Il Giornale in Ateneo” (targeted at Italian universities to bring students closer to quality information).

The organization's slogan is “Connecting Young People with the Future”.

== History ==
Founded in 2000, the Osservatorio for independent thinking is the brainchild of Andrea Ceccherini, Cesare Romiti and Andrea Riffeser Monti stemming from the “Giovani e Quotidiani: una tre giorni sull’editoria” conference. On September 18 of the same year the OPGE launched the project “Quality Information in the Classroom”, known in Italy as “Il Quotidiano in Classe”, turning the newspaper into a tool for civic education in high school classrooms. The project collaborated with several Italian media partners, including Corriere della Sera, La Repubblica, Il Sole 24 Ore, La Stampa, Il Giorno, Il Resto del Carlino, La Nazione, Bresciaoggi, Gazzetta del Sud, Gazzetta di Parma, Giornale di Sicilia, Il Gazzettino, Il Giornale di Vicenza, Il Mattino, Il Messaggero, and L’Arena.

In 2002 “Crescere tra le righe” was established, an event held every year up until 2018. In its 2015 edition the event had as guest speakers: Gerard Baker, then Editor-in-Chief for The Wall Street Journal, Dean Baquet, then Executive Editor of The New York Times, and Martin Baron, then Executive Editor of The Washington Post.

Former President of the Italian Republic Carlo Azeglio Ciampi received a group representing the Osservatorio, led by Andrea Ceccherini, at the Quirinale on March 30, 2005. On December 19, 2007, “Il Quaderno della Costituzione” was presented at the Quirinale as part of the celebrations marking the 60th anniversary of the Italian Constitution, following an invitation from then-President Giorgio Napolitano.

In November 2011, President Ceccherini and the Osservatorio's members were received in private audience by Pope Benedict XVI. In 2014 “Young Factor” saw the light; a project aimed at providing economic and financial literacy.

On its 18th anniversary in 2017, the Osservatorio invited Apple CEO Tim Cook to deliver a speech in front of more than 1,000 high school students from across Italy. The event was part of a series called “Nuovi incontri per il futuro” (“New encounters for the future”), which also featured other prominent Silicon Valley leaders, including Laurene Powell Jobs (widow of Steve Jobs, founder of Emerson Collective, and owner of The Atlantic), Jan Koum (founder of WhatsApp), Eric Schmidt (former Google CEO), and Evan Spiegel (founder of Snapchat).

In 2019, an announcement was made from the Teatro Odeon in Florence of a partnership between the Osservatorio and Apple to train the critical thinking of new generations.

In 2022 the Governors of the Central Banks of France, Italy, the Netherlands, Spain, Germany and Portugal, along with the President of the Osservatorio, signed a Memorandum of Understanding (MoU) in order to improve economic and financial literacy among young Europeans. This agreement marked the entrance of the Governors into the International Advisory Board chaired by Andrea Ceccherini. The MoU was the culmination of a series of meetings held as part of the “Young Factor” project, which included participation from key European Central Bank leaders: Jean-Claude Trichet (President of the European Central Bank from 2003 to 2011 and Governor of the Bank of France from 1993 to 2003), Joachim Nagel (President of the Bundesbank since 2022), François Villeroy de Galhau (Governor of the Bank of France since 2015), Ignazio Visco (Governor of the Bank of Italy from 2011 to 2023), Klaas Knot (President of the Dutch Central Bank), and Pablo Hernández de Cos (Governor of the Bank of Spain from 2018 to 2024).

On March 31, 2023, the president of the ECB Christine Lagarde took part in an event held by the Osservatorio, where she answered questions from 450 European students. Discussions centred on the creation of a Eurobarometer to evaluate the competencies and education levels of future EU citizens, paired with the idea of an annual day dedicated to showcasing its results and advancing financial literacy among young people.

In November 2024, the Osservatorio marked its 25th anniversary with an event in Rome, held at the Salone delle Fontane in the EUR district. The ceremony was attended by the President of the Italian Republic, Sergio Mattarella, and the President of the Osservatorio alongside students, teachers, and a delegation from the Osservatorio. During the event, President Sergio Mattarella delivered a speech and engaged with questions from some of the approximately 1,000 high school students present.

The event also featured the presentation of the Osservatorio’s international initiative Doubt and Debate, which aims to foster informed citizenship among young people while combating misinformation and the spread of fake news. The initiative involves international media collaborations with CNN, The New York Times, The Wall Street Journal, and The Washington Post. The project also maintains partnerships with Italian media organizations including Rai, Mediaset, La Repubblica, La Stampa, Il Sole 24 Ore, and Il Giornale, as well as Spanish media organizations such as El País, Cinco Días, ABC, LAVANGUARDIA, and SER.

== Projects and collaborations with Corporate Social Responsibility companies ==
“Young Factor”, which is the result of the collaboration between the Osservatorio, the Intesa Sanpaolo and Unicredit banks, is an economic and financial literacy project held in Italy's high schools. During ten class lessons, students are trained on ten keywords in economic and financial education chosen for the year.

“Technology Digital Literacy” is promoted by the Osservatorio and is directly linked to the initiative “Quality Information in the Classroom”. The goal is to provide a path of technological literacy to high school students and their teachers.

Since 2019, Apple has supported the Osservatorio with a new initiative aimed at teaching young people the critical thinking skills necessary in today's digital era. A media literacy project for the promotion of free press that guarantees democracy.

“E-project: Ecological Literacy” is instead a three-year project held in Italian high schools aimed at raising awareness among younger generations on issues related to ecological and environmental education.

== Operational organization ==
An international group of professionals with backgrounds in publishing, media, economic affairs, technology, and social sectors supports the leadership of the Osservatorio.

Under the direction of President Andrea Ceccherini, the organization also benefits from the guidance of an International Advisory Board. Among its members are Mario Centeno, who serves as Governor of Banco de Portugal; Klaas Knot, the current President of Nederlandsche Bank; Joachim Nagel, leading Deutsche Bundesbank as its President; Fabio Panetta, who serves as Governor of Banca d’Italia; and François Villeroy de Galhau, the current Governor of Banque de France. The Board’s mission is to steer the organization’s efforts to enhance economic and financial literacy on a Europe-wide scale.

There is also an International Advisory Council consisting of Ceccherini, Tim Cook (Apple CEO), Joe Kahn (Executive Editor of The New York Times) and Emma Tucker (Editor-in-Chief of The Wall Street Journal). It oversees the guidelines of actions aimed at developing critical thinking among young people through tech-media literacy projects.

== Publications ==
- Osservatorio Permanente Giovani-Editori, Il quotidiano in classe: come leggere il giornale a scuola, La Nuova Italia, 2001
- Osservatorio Permanente Giovani-Editori, Il quotidiano in classe: il valore dell'esperienza, percorsi didattici per l'educazione alla lettura e al pensiero libero, La Nuova Italia, 2002
- Osservatorio Permanente Giovani-Editori, Il quotidiano in classe: come leggere il giornale a scuola, La Nuova Italia, 2002
- Osservatorio Permanente Giovani-Editori, Il quotidiano in classe: come leggere il giornale a scuola per far crescere i giovani e la democrazia, La Nuova Italia, 2003
- Osservatorio Permanente Giovani-Editori, Il quotidiano in classe, il valore dell'esperienza: percorsi didattici per l'educazione alla lettura e al pensiero libero, La Nuova Italia, 2004
- Osservatorio Permanente Giovani-Editori, Il quotidiano in classe. Una didattica del giornale: percorsi di lavoro a scuola, La Nuova Italia, 2005
- Osservatorio Permanente Giovani-Editori, Il quotidiano in classe: dai giovani di oggi ai cittadini liberi di domani, La Nuova Italia, 2006
- Osservatorio Permanente Giovani-Editori, Il quotidiano in classe: educazione alla cittadinanza, La Nuova Italia, 2007
- Osservatorio Permanente Giovani-Editori, Il quotidiano in classe: spunti per una nuova formazione, La Nuova Italia, 2009
- Osservatorio Permanente Giovani-Editori, Il quotidiano in classe: conoscere l'oggi per essere il domani, La Nuova Italia, 2009
- Osservatorio Permanente Giovani-Editori, Il quotidiano in classe: suggestioni, spunti e idee per lezioni nel quotidiano, La Nuova Italia, 2010
- Gabriela Jacomella, Osservatorio Permanente Giovani-Editori, Osservatorio Permanente Giovani-Editori: una storia semplice, Rizzoli, 2012
- Osservatorio Permanente Giovani-Editori, Il quotidiano in classe: nuovi stimoli per una nuova formazione, La Nuova Italia, 2012
- Osservatorio Permanente Giovani-Editori, Il quotidiano in classe: per educare i giovani a distinguere il giornalismo di qualità dal resto dell'informazione, La Nuova Italia, 2013
- Osservatorio Permanente Giovani-Editori, Il quotidiano in classe: tra carta e web per riconoscere l'informazione di qualità, La Nuova Italia, 2014
- Osservatorio Permanente Giovani-Editori, Il quotidiano in classe: educare alla cittadinanza attraverso l'informazione di qualità, La Nuova Italia, 2015
- Osservatorio Permanente Giovani-Editori, Il quotidiano in classe: alla ricerca dell'informazione di qualità, attraverso lo sviluppo dello spirito critico che rende più liberi, La Nuova Italia, 2016
- Osservatorio Permanente Giovani-Editori, Il quotidiano in classe: alla ricerca dell'informazione di qualità, attraverso lo sviluppo dello spirito critico che rende più liberi, Rizzoli Education, 2017
- Osservatorio Permanente Giovani-Editori, Il quotidiano in classe: ognuno ha diritto alle proprie opinioni, nessuno ai propri fatti, Rizzoli Education, 2018

== See also ==
- Critical thinking
- Media literacy
- Financial literacy
- Digital literacy
