= Ceccaroni =

Ceccaroni (pronounced [tʃekkaˈroːni]) is an Italian surname derived from the male given name Cecco. Notable people with the surname include:

- Massimo Ceccaroni (born 1968), Swiss-Italian football player and trainer
- Pietro Ceccaroni (born 1995), Italian football player
- Stefano Ceccaroni (born 1961), Swiss-Italian football player and trainer, brother of Massimo

== See also ==
- Ceccarini
- Ceccaroli
