= Andrea Ceccherini =

International Civic leader (born 1974)

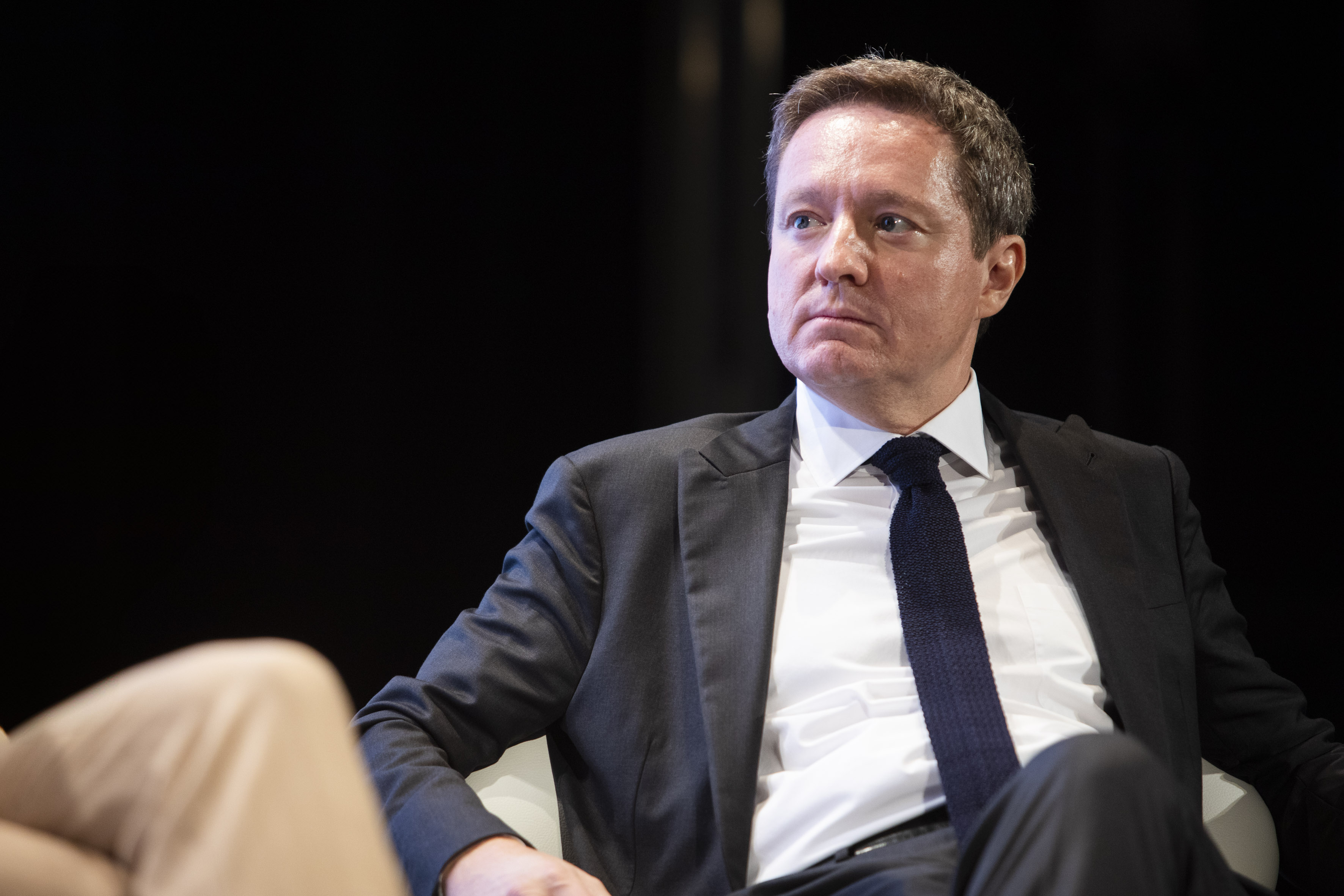
- Born: March 31, 1974 (age 52); Florence, Italy
- Occupation: International Civic leader

Andrea Ceccherini OMRI (born March 31, 1974) is an international civic leader who has been founder and president of Osservatorio for independent thinking since 2000.

== Career ==
Andrea Ceccherini founded the "Progetto Città" organization in 1995, which is dedicated to training future young leaders and encouraging active participation in civic life. Since its founding, Andrea Ceccherini has served as the president of the organization.

In June 2000, he co-founded the Osservatorio Permanente Giovani-Editori, known today as the Osservatorio for independent thinking, along with Cesare Romiti and Andrea Riffeser Monti. This Italian nonprofit organization, based in Florence, operates with the mission of developing critical thinking and civility of younger generations in the fields of media education and economic-financial literacy for young people. Andrea Ceccherini has served as the President of the organization since its inception. With him at the helm, the Osservatorio has developed several national and international projects, including Il Quotidiano in Classe (Daily Information in the Classroom), Young Factor, and Il Giornale in Ateneo (The Newspaper at University).

In September 2000, Il Quotidiano in Classe initiative was introduced as a media literacy project aimed at examining how different news outlets report the same news in distinct ways, with the goal of keeping young people engaged with world affairs and fostering their involvement as citizens in a democracy. Over the years, the following media partners have been involved in the project: Corriere della Sera, La Repubblica, Il Sole 24 Ore, Quotidiano Nazionale, La Nazione, Il Giorno, Il Resto del Carlino, La Stampa, Il Gazzettino, Il Messaggero, Il Mattino, L'Arena, Bresciaoggi, Gazzetta di Parma, Gazzetta del Sud, Il Giornale di Vicenza. The initiative has engaged millions of students over the years.

In May 2014, Andrea Ceccherini launched "Young Factor", an economic and financial literacy project aimed at Italian high school students. Throughout ten class lessons, students are taught about ten important keywords in economic and financial education that are selected annually. Nearly 700,000 students participated in the project last year. To support "Young Factor", the Osservatorio partnered with major Italian banking institutions.

In 2019, Andrea Ceccherini, as the initiator and organizer, together with Tim Cook, announced a partnership between Apple and the Osservatorio aimed at developing critical thinking skills in the younger generation. Since then, Apple has supported the mission of the Osservatorio with a media literacy project to promote a free press as a means of ensuring democratic principles.

In 2022, Andrea Ceccherini, as the driving force behind the project, signed a Memorandum of Understanding alongside the Governors of the Central Banks of France, Italy, the Netherlands, Spain, Germany, and Portugal. The agreement, which focused on enhancing economic and financial literacy among young Europeans, led to the Governors joining the Osservatorio's International Advisory Board, which was conceived, organized, and is chaired by Andrea Ceccherini.

On March 31, 2023, Christine Lagarde, the president of the European Central Bank, participated as the guest of honor in an event organized by the Osservatorio, which included 450 European students. At the event, Lagarde engaged with students by answering their questions and acknowledged Andrea Ceccherini's proposal to establish an annual European day focused on the state of economic and financial education for young people, as a crucial element for financial stability.

In November 2024, Andrea Ceccherini presented Doubt and Debate, an Osservatorio for independent thinking’s international initiative to help young people critically assess information and recognize fake news. The project collaborates with major US (CNN, The New York Times, The Wall Street Journal, The Washington Post), Italian (Rai, Mediaset, La Repubblica, La Stampa, Il Sole 24 Ore, Il Giornale), and Spanish (El País, Cinco Días, ABC, LAVANGUARDIA, SER) media organizations. Doubt and Debate was presented at the Salone delle Fontane (EUR) in Rome during the Osservatorio’s 25th anniversary. President of the Italian Republic Sergio Mattarella attended as a guest of honor, addressing 1,000 high school students and answering their questions.

== Honors ==
Officer of the Order of Merit – Motu proprio, President of Italian Republic - ribbon for ordinary uniform

Officer of the Order of Merit of the Italian Republic – Motu proprio
— March 5, 2026

Knight of the Order of Merit – Motu proprio, President of Italian Republic - ribbon for ordinary uniform

Knight of the Order of Merit of the Italian Republic – Motu proprio
— December 30, 2020

== Awards ==
- In November 2007, Andrea Ceccherini received the Gonfalone d’Argento from the Regional Council of Tuscany
- In October 2008, the University of Florence honored him with the Salomone d'Oro award
- On 7 May 2021, he was named among the 14 Italian distinguished individuals who received the Guido Carli Award
- On 5 June 2021, he was presented with the Pegaso d’Oro, the highest institutional award from the Tuscany Region
- On 23 June 2022, the City of Florence awarded him the Gold Florin for his contributions to education

== See also ==
- Critical thinking
- Osservatorio for independent thinking
- Media literacy
- Financial literacy
- Digital literacy
