= Dave Ceccarelli =

American politician

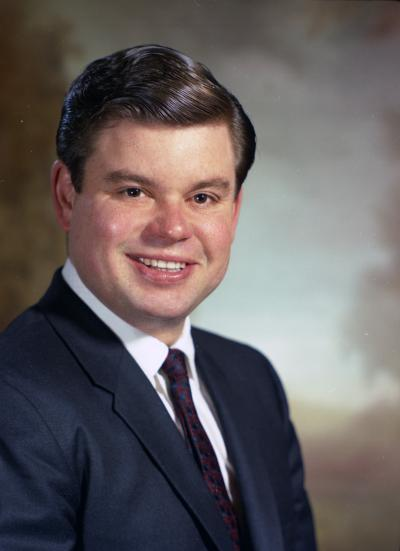
- Ceccarelli in 1967

Member of the Washington House of Representatives for the 34th district
- In office 1967–1977

Personal details
- Born: c. 1935 (age 90–91) West Seattle, Washington, U.S.
- Party: Democratic

David Ceccarelli (born c. 1935) is an American former politician in the state of Washington. He served the 34th district from 1967 to 1977.
