= Mattia Ceccaroli =

Sammarinese footballer (born 1999)

Personal information
- Full name: Mattia Ceccaroli
- Date of birth: 3 February 1999 (age 27)
- Place of birth: San Marino
- Position: Midfielder

Youth career
- –2017: San Marino Academy
- 2017–2018: Victor San Marino

Senior career*
| Years | Team | Apps | (Gls) |
| 2018–2024 | Domagnano | 94 | (14) |

International career^{‡}
| 2015 | San Marino U17 | 3 | (0) |
| 2016–2018 | San Marino U21 | 6 | (0) |
| 2019–2021 | San Marino U21 | 10 | (0) |
| 2022 | San Marino | 1 | (0) |
- * Club domestic league appearances and goals as of 31 May 2025 ‡ National team caps and goals as of 21 November 2022

Mattia Ceccaroli (born 3 February 1999) is a Sammarinese footballer who last played as a midfielder for Domagnano and was capped by the San Marino national team.

== Career ==
Ceccaroli made his international debut for San Marino on 20 November 2022 in a friendly match against Saint Lucia, which finished as a 0–1 away loss.

== Career statistics ==
=== International ===
As of 21 November 2022

San Marino
| Year | Apps | Goals |
|---|---|---|
| 2022 | 1 | 0 |
| Total | 1 | 0 |
