= Alfonso Ceccarelli =

Italian physician and genealogist

- Born: 1532; Città di Castello, Italy
- Died: 9 July 1583 (aged 50–51); Rome, Italy
- Cause of death: execution by decapitation
- Occupations: physician; genealogist
- Relatives: Odoardo Ceccarelli (grandson)

Alfonso Ceccarelli (1532–1583) was an Italian physician and genealogist. He authored many false genealogical studies. He was sued, arrested, tortured and beheaded for forging wills and other legal documents.

== Early life ==
Alfonso Ceccarelli was born in 1532 in Città di Castello, Italy. His father was a notary.

== Career ==
Ceccarelli was a physician and genealogist. He started practising medicine in 1569. Meanwhile, he specialised in writing local histories, highlighting the prominence of whichever family hired him to do so. For example, when he was hired by the Podiani family, he wrote a study about prominent members of this family in the town of Rieti.

Ceccarelli authored a false version of Chronicae Gualdenses, a lost medieval text about Umbria, and used it as a source for his own studies.

Ceccarelli was the author of De familiis illustribus Italiæ ac de earum origine under the pseudonym of Fanusio Campano. The genealogical study suggested the House of Grimaldi descended from Normandy, which was false.

Ceccarelli forged wills and other legal documents. He was sued, arrested and tortured.

== Death and legacy ==
Ceccarelli was beheaded for his crimes on 9 July 1583, in Rome, Italy.

In the seventeenth century, Ceccarelli's research was used as a source by Charles de Venasque-Ferriol, a Monegasque courtier who authored Genealogica et Historica Grimaldœ Gentis arbor in 1647 with the aim of linking the House of Grimaldi to the French royal family.
