= Andrea Adami da Bolsena =

Italian composer

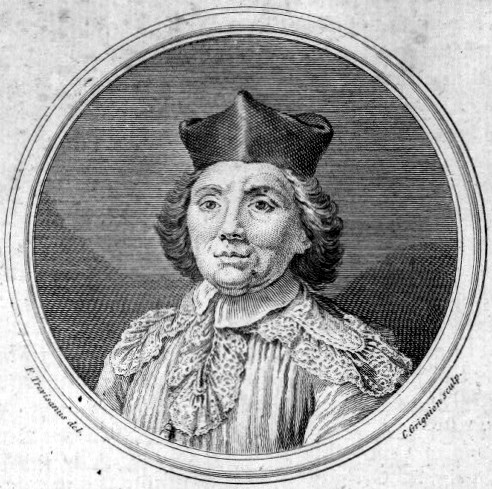
etching of Adami

Andrea Adami da Bolsena (30 November 1663 – 22 July 1742) was an Italian castrato, musician, and later secretary to Cardinal Pietro Ottoboni.

== Life ==
He was born in Bolsena. Until 1690, he served the former queen Christina I of Sweden, alongside violinist Archangelo Corelli and cellist Filippo Amadei. They performed in operas by Flavio Carlo Lanciani (1667–1706) and Alessandro Stradella.

Through the influence of and as a favourite of Cardinal Ottoboni, he was appointed master of the papal choir in 1700. He left a history of this institution, with portraits and memoirs of the singers (in the Sistine Chapel), under the title of "Osservazioni per ben regolare il coro dei cantori della Cappella Pontificia" (Rome, 1711).

He was reportedly highly esteemed by the Romans for his personal as well as his musical gifts. He helped his nephew Lionardo Adami become the librarian. He died in Rome.
