= Giancarlo Ceccarelli =

Italian footballer

Giancarlo Ceccarelli (born 31 August 1956 in Frascati) is a retired Italian footballer. He played as a midfielder. After playing in Lazio youth teams, he went to play in Serie B for 4 years, during which he gained a promotion in Serie A with Avellino. After a relegation with Sambenedettese, he continued his career in Serie C1 and Serie C2 and retired in 1985.

== Career ==
1973–1976 Lazio 0 (0)
1976–1977 Brescia 1 (0)
1977–1978 Avellino 26 (2)
1978–1981 Sambenedettese 62 (3)
1981–1982 Rende 33 (2)
1982–1983 Forlì 16 (0)
1983–1984 Giulianova 27 (3)
1984–1985 Olbia 34 (0)
