= François Villeroy de Galhau =

Governor of the Bank of France from 2015 to 2026

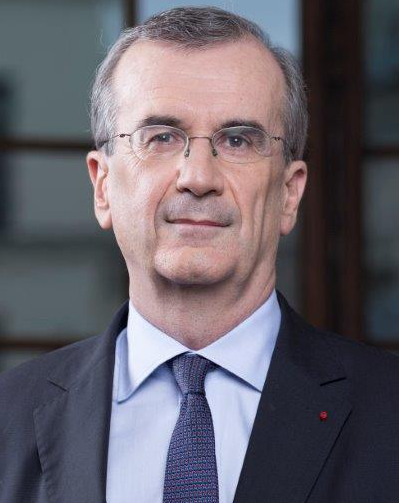
- Villeroy de Galhau in 2017

Governor of the Bank of France
- In office 1 November 2015 – 1 June 2026
- Preceded by: Christian Noyer
- Succeeded by: Emmanuel Moulin

Chair of the Bank for International Settlements
- In office 1 January 2022 – 2 June 2026
- General Manager: Agustín Carstens; Pablo Hernández de Cos
- Preceded by: Jens Weidmann
- Succeeded by: Fabio Panetta

Personal details
- Born: François Marie Bernard Villeroy de Galhau; 24 February 1959 (age 67) Strasbourg, France
- Education: Lycée Saint-Louis-de-Gonzague
- Alma mater: École polytechnique École nationale d'administration

François Marie Bernard Villeroy de Galhau (French pronunciation: [fʁɑ̃swa vilʁwa d(ə) ɡalo]; born 24 February 1959) is a French senior civil servant and banker who served as Governor of the Bank of France and ex officio President of the French Prudential Supervision and Resolution Authority from 2015 until 2026. In February 2026, he announced his resignation, effective in June 2026.

== Early life ==
Born in Strasbourg, he descends from the family Villeroy de Galhau (co-owner of the ceramic manufacturer Villeroy & Boch, domiciled since the late 18th century in Wallerfangen (Saarland)); he speaks German fluently. After earning his French baccalaureate degree at the Lycée Saint-Louis-de-Gonzague, and his engineering degree at the École Polytechnique, he studied at the École nationale d'administration (ÉNA) from 1982 to 1984.

== Career ==
=== Career in the public sector ===
Villeroy de Galhau started his career at the Inspection générale des finances.

From 1990 to 1993, he was European politics adviser of the Finance Minister of France and then of the Prime Minister of France Pierre Bérégovoy; he worked in several departments at the Direction du Trésor in Bercy and then in Brussels, as conseiller financier in the Permanent Mission of France.

Under the Government of Lionel Jospin (1997–2002), he was (1997–99) directeur de cabinet of Dominique Strauss-Kahn, and (1999–2000) of Christian Sautter (Minister of the Economy, Finances and Industry) and from February 2000 to 26 August 2003 director general of the Direction générale des Impôts (directeur général des impôts).

=== Career in the private sector ===
In 2003, Villeroy de Galhau became general manager of Cetelem, a BNP Paribas company giving retail credits, and from 2011 to 2015 he was general manager for domestic markets at BNP Paribas.

In May 2015, Prime Minister Manuel Valls appointed him to lead a committee scanning the financing of investments. He delivered his report on 26 September 2015.

=== Governor of the Bank of France ===
On 8 September 2015, the President of France, François Hollande, nominated Villeroy de Galhau as next Governor of the Bank of France, succeeding Christian Noyer. As such, he presides over the General Council, the body responsible for deliberating on all matters relating to non-Eurosystem activities. He conducts the three main missions of the Banque de France: monetary strategy, financial stability and the provision of economic service to households and small businesses.

As Bank of France governor, Villeroy de Galhau also sits in the Governing Council of the European Central Bank, which makes monetary policy decisions for the whole Eurozone.

Upon his arrival, Villeroy de Galhau amplified the transformation plan of his predecessor Christian Noyer, which he named "Ambition 2020". During this period, the Bank of France transferred an amount of 4.5 billion euros to the French state in 2016, then 5 billion euros in 2017 and 5.6 billion euros in 2018, and 6.5 billions in 2019; most of which stemmed from the interest income earned in the context of the asset purchases programmes (quantitative easing) conducted in the whole Eurosystem as part of the ECB's monetary policy.

In 2017, Villeroy de Galhau took part in the launch of the Network for Greening the Financial System. Under his leadership, the Banque de France announced plans to exit from coal and limit exposure to gas and oil in its investment portfolio by 2024 as part of a shift towards more environmentally friendly assets.

In June 2022, Villeroy de Galhau was assaulted on the street and heavily injured by a hammer-wielding Swiss man in Basel, Switzerland, after heading a board meeting at the Bank for International Settlements. After passersby overwhelmed the assailant, Villeroy de Galhau was hospitalized. The assault was not publicized, but court papers seen by Swiss media indicate that Swiss authorities consider a political motive possible. In November 2024, Villeroy de Galhau was re-elected as chair of the Bank for International Settlements Board of Directors for a second 3-year term.

==== Covid-19 crisis ====
Villeroy de Galhau highlighted the State's role as a "shock absorber" to mitigate the crisis, observing that "Massive public intervention has absorbed at least two-thirds of the shock, significantly cushioning the impact for households and companies".

Villeroy de Galhau noted the strong consensus among economists regarding the measures required to end the crisis and restart the economy as soon as possible and in the best possible conditions: creation of a "cash shield" for all companies, resumption of business activities and implementation of major investment programmes. An increase in public debt must be accepted as a natural consequence of these measures.

Finally, Villeroy de Galhau recalled the benefits of credit mediation for companies struggling to secure a loan. This service was in extremely high demand during the crisis, processing as many requests in one day as in an entire month in 2019.

On 14 December 2020, Villeroy de Galhau estimated that the French economy had shrunk by 9% on average in 2020 compared to pre-Covid activity levels. He predicted 5% growth in 2021 and 2022.

On 9 February 2026, he announced resigning from the job in June 2026. He said that he had done well in the job and announcing becoming president of the charity Apprentis d'Auteuil. According to media consensus, the departure before the end of Macron's presidential mandate presented an opportunity for Macro to nominate a moderate successor, before potential election win by the Rassemblement national party.

== Other activities ==
=== Regulatory agencies ===
- French Prudential Supervision and Resolution Authority (ACPR), Ex-Officio Chairman (since 2015)
- European Central Bank (ECB), Ex-Officio Member of the Governing Council (since 2015)
- European Systemic Risk Board (ESRB), Ex-Officio Member (since 2015)
- Bank for International Settlements (BIS), Ex-Officio Member of the board of directors (since 2015)
- International Monetary Fund (IMF), Ex-Officio Alternate Member of the Board of Governors (since 2015)
- Member of the High Council for Financial Stability
- Chairman of the Observatory for the Security of Payment Means

=== Corporate boards ===
- Villeroy & Boch AG, Member of the Supervisory Board

=== Non-profit organizations ===
- Institut de la Finance Durable (IFD), Member of the Board of Directors (since 2022)
- Osservatorio Permanente Giovani-Editori, Member of the International Advisory Board
- Gracques, Member
- Paris Europlace, Member of the board of directors

== Political positions ==
Villeroy de Galhau has supported Mario Draghi's policy of "easy money" and complimented Draghi's policy during the European debt crisis of 2012. He has called German inflation fears "exaggerated and irrational".

He has taken many public positions as governor of the Banque de France, for instance on cryptocurrencies such as bitcoin which he recalls is not a currency, unemployment ("the most urgent situation in France"), social expense, public service payroll, the banking union, over-indebtedness, and contactless payment.

In the traditional letter from the governor of the Banque de France to the French President, he called on Emmanuel Macron to use the economic recovery to pursue political reforms and defend the European social model as a shield against social inequalities, in 2017. In 2018, he underlined the urgent need for the public expenditure to be contained. In 2019, he celebrated the 20th anniversary of the Euro, calling the currency a success that has helped increase the average purchasing power of the French people.

In his 2020 letter on the economic crisis resulting from the COVID-19 pandemic, Villeroy de Galhau urged the President to make fiscal stability a priority, neither increasing nor reducing taxes. He emphasized the need to devise a reconstruction strategy, based on confidence among households and cooperation from macroeconomic corporations.

In 2021, Villeroy de Galhau rejected proposals made by France's Economic Analysis Council according to which the European Central Bank could make direct cash transfers to households – so-called helicopter money payments – to help meet its inflation target.

== Honours ==
- Commander of the Legion of Honour (2025)

== Publications ==
=== Books ===
- Développement des activités financières au regard des exigences éthiques du christianisme, Librairie Vaticane, 1994 (ISBN 978-2110011275)
- Dix-huit leçons sur la politique économique : à la recherche de la régulation, mit Jean-Claude Prager, foreword by Michel Pébereau, Éditions du Seuil, 2003, 2nd, updated edition 2006 (ISBN 978-2020822749)
- L'espérance d'un européen, Éditions Odile Jacob, October 2014 (ISBN 978-2738130914)

=== Some of his articles ===
- « Le changement dans l'État, c'est possible », in Sociétal, 2002, No. 35, p. 26–30
- Bercy : la réforme sans le grand soir ?, En temps réel, 2004 (online (pdf, 36 p.)
- « Justice et fiscalité », in Études, No. 4064, April 2007, p. 463–474
- « La vocation d'un dirigeant est aussi d'être un serviteur à l'écoute », in La Vie, No. 3260 (21–27 February 2008), p. 18–19
- "De l'urgence d'aujourd'hui aux premières réflexions pour demain", Le Monde, 8 April 2020

In the daily newspaper La Croix

- « Ces entreprises qui font l'Europe », 22 March 2006
- « La pression et le bénédictin », 28 December 2006
- « Voyage dans le cerveau du monde », 13 June 2007
- « Un trésor trop discret », 24 October 2007
- « Y a-t-il un pilote dans l'avion ? », 26 September 2008
- « Sagesses de mon village allemand », 17 September 2012

Government offices
| Preceded by Christian Noyer | Governor of the Bank of France; 2015–2026 | Succeeded by Emmanuel Moulin |
