= Giampiero Ceccarelli =

Italian footballer (born 1948)

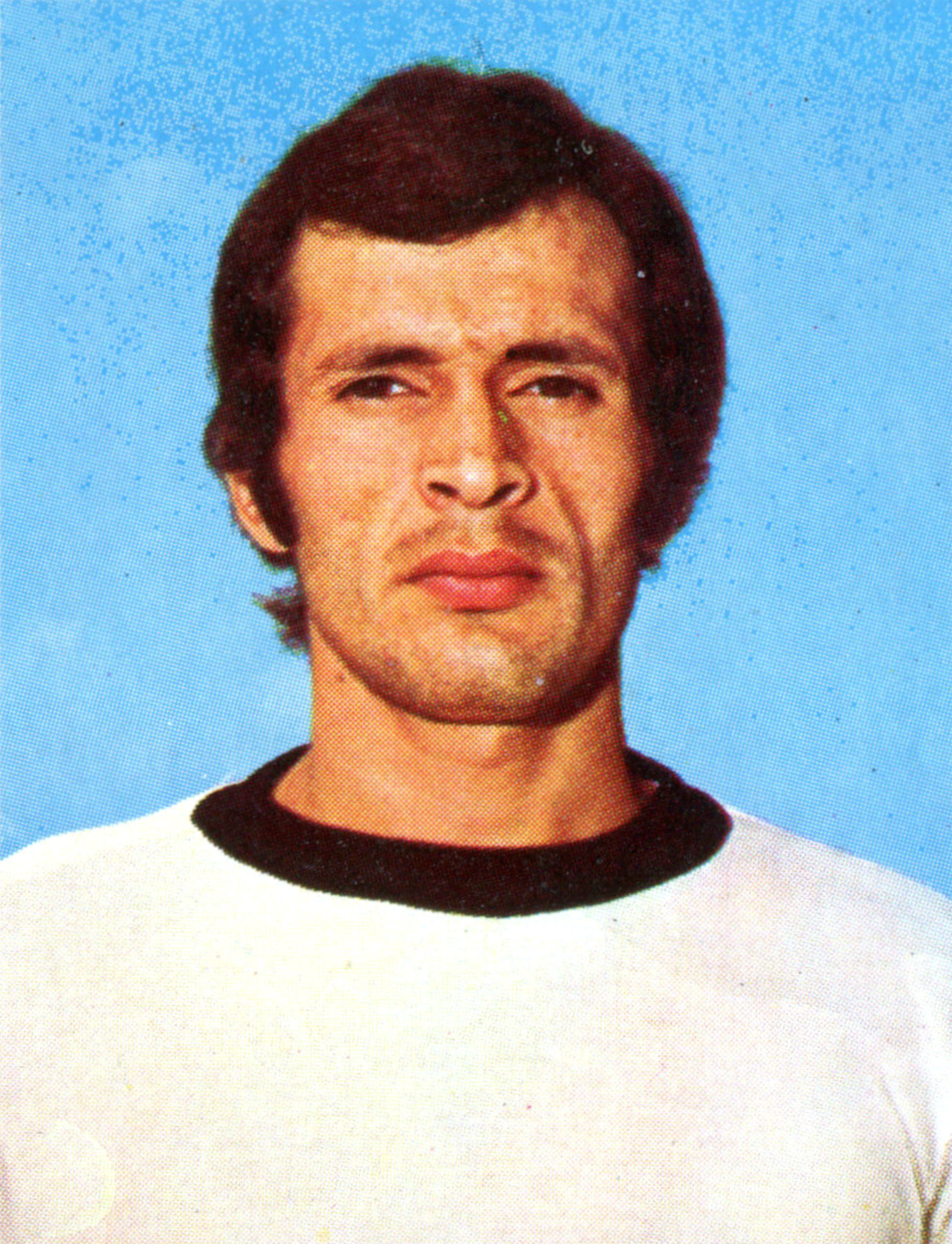

Personal information
- Date of birth: 22 April 1948 (age 78)
- Place of birth: Italy
- Position: Defender

Senior career*
Years	Team	Apps	(Gls)
1966–1985	Cesena	520	(8)
- * Club domestic league appearances and goals

Giampiero Ceccarelli (22 April 1948) is an Italian football manager and former footballer who played as a defender.

== Career ==
Ceccarelli played for Italian side Cesena, where he captained the club. He was described as "hold the record for appearances in official matches of the Romagna club".

== Personal life ==
After retiring from professional football, Ceccarelli lived in Cervia, Italy.
