= Corrado Benedetti =

Italian footballer (1957–2014)

Personal information
- Date of birth: 20 January 1957
- Place of birth: Cesena, Italy
- Date of death: 15 February 2014 (aged 57)
- Place of death: Savignano sul Rubicone, Italy
- Position: Defender

Youth career
- –1976: Cesena

Senior career*
Years	Team	Apps	(Gls)
1976–1980	Cesena	112	(4)
1980–1982	Bologna	55	(3)
1982–1983	Cesena	27	(0)
1983–1986	Perugia	96	(2)
1986–1987	Catania	29	(0)
1987–1989	Trento	64	(3)
1989–1990	Livorno	31	(1)
1990–1991	Forlì	28	(2)

International career
1977	Italy U21	1	(0)

Managerial career
- 1993–1995: Cesena (youth)
- 1995–1997: Cesena Primavera
- 1997: Cesena (co-coach)
- 1997–1998: Cesena
- 1999–2001: Castel di Sangro
- 2001–2002: Pisa
- 2003–2005: Benevento
- 2005–2006: Grosseto
- 2006: Perugia
- 2008: Pistoiese
- * Club domestic league appearances and goals

Corrado Benedetti (20 January 1957 – 15 February 2014) was an Italian footballer who played as a defender.

Benedetti played for Cesena, Bologna, Perugia, Catania, Trento, Livorno, and Forlì. He died on 15 February 2014, just a few weeks after his 57th birthday.
