= Andrea Agnelli =

Italian businessman (born 1975)

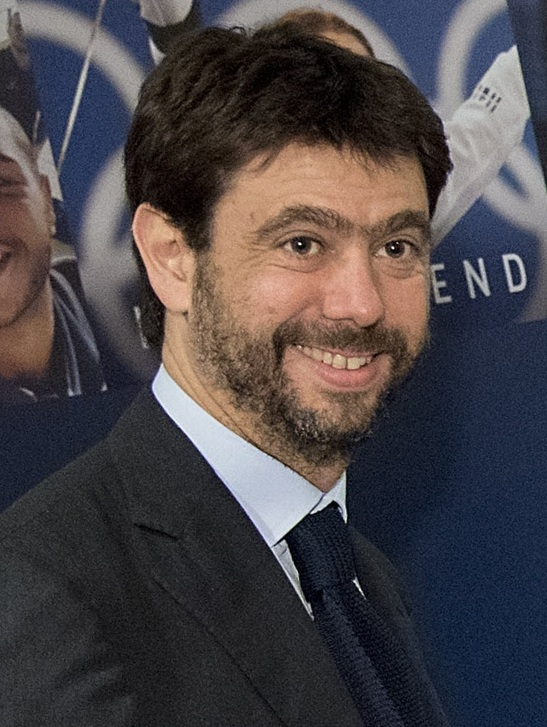
- Agnelli in 2017
- Born: 6 December 1975 (age 50); Turin, Italy
- Education: St Clare's, Oxford; Bocconi University
- Employer: Stellantis
- Known for: Chairman of Juventus; President of the European Club Association
- Spouses: Emma Winter (m. 2005; div. 2016) Deniz Akalin (m. 2023)
- Children: 4
- Parents: Umberto Agnelli; Allegra Caracciolo di Castagneto
- Relatives: Giovanni Agnelli (great-grandfather); Edoardo Agnelli (grandfather); Gianni Agnelli (uncle); Susanna Agnelli (aunt); Cristiana Brandolini d'Adda (aunt); Edoardo Agnelli (cousin); John Elkann (cousin); Lapo Elkann (cousin); Ginevra Elkann (cousin); Prince Egon von Fürstenberg (cousin); Muriel Brandolini (cousin-in-law); Marie Angliviel de la Beaumelle (cousin-in-law); Georgina Brandolini d'Adda (cousin-in-law); Marcantonio Brandolini d'Adda (first cousin once removed); Bianca Brandolini d'Adda (first cousin once removed); Coco Brandolini d'Adda (first cousin once removed); Prince Alexander von Fürstenberg (first cousin once removed); Talita von Fürstenberg (first cousin twice removed)

Andrea Agnelli (Italian: [anˈdrɛːa aɲˈɲɛlli]; born 6 December 1975) is an Italian businessman. From May 2010 to November 2022, Agnelli served as chairman of Italian association football club Juventus, which returned to Italian football dominance throughout the 2010s with nine consecutive record-breaking Serie A titles, along with four consecutive national doubles and one domestic treble. Under Agnelli's presidency, Juventus also returned to European competitiveness, reaching one UEFA Europa League semi-final and two UEFA Champions League finals. In November 2022, he resigned his positions, amid the Plusvalenze investigation.

A member of the industrialist Agnelli family, he was a board member of Exor and Stellantis. Appointed to the UEFA Executive Committee in 2015, Agnelli served as executive member and chairman of the European Club Association from 2017 to 2021, when he resigned to join the European Super League project.

== Early life and family ==
Born in 1975, Agnelli is the son of late Juventus chairman and senator Umberto Agnelli, CEO of FIAT from 1970 to 1976, and Donna Allegra Caracciolo di Castagneto (born 1945), first cousin of Marella Agnelli (1927–2019), born Donna Marella Caracciolo di Castagneto and daughter of Filippo Caracciolo, 8th Prince of Castagneto, 3rd Duke of Melito, and a hereditary patrician of Naples (1903–1965), and his wife, Donna Anna Visconti di Modrone (1903–1977). Along with Marella, widow of his uncle Gianni Agnelli, and Allegra, he is descendants of an old Neapolitan noble family that held the titles of Prince of Castagneto and Duke of Melito, among others. He was the last male member of the family to carry the Agnelli surname until the birth of his son Giacomo. Agnelli is related to John Elkann, Lapo Elkann, Marcantonio Brandolini d'Adda and Alessandro Nasi, the cousin of Elkann. Agnelli studied the International Baccalaureate at St Clare's, Oxford, and then at Bocconi University in Milan.

== Career ==
During and after university, Agnelli started his career in the business world, including abroad in England and France at companies Iveco, Auchan Hypermarché, and back in Italy at Milan with Piaggio. He also spent several years in Switzerland working in marketing and development for Ferrari Idea S.A., where in 1999 he started his career, London-based Schroder Salomon Smith Barney, and Lausanne-based Philip Morris International from 2001 to 2004, where he was first in charge of marketing and sponsorships and then of external institutional communication. In November 2000, Agnelli moved to Paris to take on marketing responsibility for Uni Invest SA, a Sanpaolo IMI company specializing in the offer of asset management products. By 2005, he was back in Turin at IFIL. In 2007, he set up his own financial holding company, Lamse. He also cultivated his passion for golf, becoming managing director of the Royal Park Golf & Country Club I Roveri in 2008. On 29 September 2008, he was appointed federal councilor of the Italian Golf Federation. Together with Michele Dalai and Davide Dileo, he founded the publishing house ADD Editore in 2010. He is on the advisory board of BlueGem Capital Partners LLP, and he is also the president of the Piedmont Foundation for Oncology.

During his career, Agnelli maintained ties with the Fiat world. From 2005 to 2006, he held strategic development positions within IFIL, which he left in 2007 to found Lamse. On 30 May 2004, he became a board member of Fiat S.p.A., a position that he kept after it merged with Chrysler to form Fiat Chrysler Automobiles (FCA) on 12 October 2014; starting from 17 January 2021, with the merger between FCA and PSA Group, he was appointed by Exor to become a non-executive director for a four-year term of the newly formed Stellantis. Since 25 May 2006, he was also a director of the Industrial Financial Institute, which later became Exor, the holding company controlling the interests of the Agnellis. In January 2023, Agnelli announced his resignation from the position in Stellantis, effective at the close of the 2023 annual general meeting of shareholders, and that he would not reapply for the role in Exor. He remained on the board of Giovanni Agnelli B.V.

In April 2010, John Elkann, Exor chief executive officer and Agnelli's cousin, announced that Agnelli would join Jean-Claude Blanc in leading Juventus. In May 2010, Agnelli was appointed chairman of the club's board of directors after the stakeholders assembly, and became the fourth member of the Agnelli family to run the football club after his father, his uncle, and his grandfather. Elkann and the previous Juventus management led by Giovanni Cobolli Gigli and Blanc, had come under criticism from club's fans for the team's poor results during the 2009–10 Serie A, and many Juventus ultras saw Agnelli as the rightful heir due to his family's long-time association with the club. Despite entering the job during a period when the club was still dealing with the aftermath of the controversial Calciopoli scandal, he is credited with overseeing the club's transition into the Juventus Stadium and balancing their finances in wake of the late-2000s recession in Europe. One of his first acts as new chairman was to appoint Sampdoria duo Giuseppe Marotta as director of sport and Luigi Delneri as new coach.

On 22 May 2011, Agnelli appointed as the new coach Antonio Conte, former Juventus captain and fan favourite who had called him to propose himself for the role, replacing Delneri after another disappointing season and seventh place in the league, which precluded the club from any UEFA competition and was not acceptable for Agnelli, whose motto was "Playing for Juventus, working for Juventus, one goal: to win". That same season under Conte, Juventus were undefeated and won the first scudetto under Agnelli. Since becoming chairman, Juventus won nine scudetti in a row, a record in Serie A, including five Coppa Italia titles, of which four in a row since the 2014–15 Coppa Italia, five Supercoppa Italiana titles, and reached two UEFA Champions League finals.

=== Juventus ===
Agnelli became the second third-generation member of the Fiat-owner family to be involved with the Italian football club Juventus. A tradition that started in the 1920s with his grandfather, Edoardo Agnelli, he was the most recent after his cousin, Edoardo Agnelli, during the 1980s, to be involved with the club. Dating back to the late 1940s through the 1950s his uncle, Gianni Agnelli, and since the mid-1950s to early 1960s his father, Umberto Agnelli, were associated with the club as presidents and latter as honorary presidents. His collaboration started from the 1998-99 season as an assistant in the commercial sector led by Romi Gai.

In 1999, Juventus improved their own record as the first club of having won all five men's UEFA competitions by winning the Intertoto Cup, the next year was voted the seventh best of the FIFA Club of the Century poll, and in 2009 was placed second in the Continental Men's Clubs of the Century (1901–2000) statistical ranking by the IFFHS, the highest for an Italian team in both; by the early 2000s, the club had the third best revenue in Europe at over €200 million. All this changed when Calciopoli hit the club, with Agnelli being particularly critical of the management for not properly defending the club, which was acquitted and the leagues being regular; it was Agnelli who built the club back up. In the words of Fulvio Bianchi, early 2000s Juventus were "stronger than all those that came after, and had €250 million in revenue, being at the top of Europe, and 100 sponsors. It took ten years to recover and return to the top Italians, not yet Europeans: now the club makes over €300 million, but in the meantime Real, Bayern, and the others have taken off."

On 19 May 2010, Agnelli was elected chairman of the club. In doing so, after forty-eight years of absence, he became the fourth member of the Agnelli dynasty, after his grandfather, his uncle, and his father, to hold the club's premier executive charge. Under his mandate from the 2010s, Juventus established a victorious cycle, during which they won the Italian football championship for nine consecutive Serie A seasons; they broke an eighty-two years national record of five consecutive league wins, which was first achieved by Juventus under Agnelli's grandfather, and established a new national record with nine consecutivi scudetti. Among these stand out the 2011–12 Serie A, which was won undefeated, the 2013–14 Serie A season, which concluded with a record of 102 points, and the 2015–16 Serie A, which was won after an unprecedented comeback in the standings, and represented the club's first domestic treble. In the same period, Agnelli's Juventus set a further record of four consecutive domestic doubles, and achieved one UEFA Europa League semi-final in 2014, and two UEFA Champions League finals in 2015 and 2017; the club narrowly missed, not without controversy, two Champions League semi-finals, first in 2016, and then in 2018. Among the many Juventus records the club already held, Juventus under Agnelli reached new ones, most recently, as of the 2022 FIFA World Cup, extending the club's own record with the most FIFA World Cup winners (27) during their careers at the team.

On the sporting side, the Agnelli presidency included the expansion and modernization of the club's property portfolio from the Juventus Stadium, the J-Museum, the J-Hotel, the J-Medical, and the J-Village complexs, to the renewal of the club's corporate identity by adopting a pictogram of a stilized black and white J, a letter that is not used in the Italian alphabet, as logo. The Agnelli management established the second men's team, Juventus U23, which won the 2019–20 Coppa Italia Serie C and was renamed Juventus Next Gen in August 2022, and the first women's team, Juventus Women, the latter of which immediately became multi-titled and became the first team to achieve a perfect season in 2020–21, and pushed for the entry of the club into the world of electronic sports. On the management side, after having promoted turnaround management through a renewal process aimed at overcoming the financial crisis in which the club had been stagnating for some years, he led Juventus to achieve results never before achieved in the economic sphere by an Italian football club.

In regards to sports policy, Agnelli took a tougher position than that of the previous Juventus management, led by Giovanni Cobolli Gigli and subsequently by Jean-Claude Blanc, in the aftermath of the post-Calciopoli. Several observers allege that Calciopoli and its aftermath were also a dispute within Juventus and between the club's owners, including Franzo Grande Stevens and Gianluigi Gabetti who favoured Elkann over Agnelli as chairman, and wanted to get rid of Luciano Moggi, Antonio Giraudo, and Roberto Bettega, whose shares in the club increased. Whatever their intentions, it is argued they condemned Juventus: first when Carlo Zaccone, the club's lawyer, agreed for relegation to Serie B and point-deduction, when he made that statement because Juventus were the only club risking more than one-division relegation (Serie C), and he meant for Juventus (the sole club to be ultimately demoted) to have equal treatment with the other clubs; and then when Luca Cordero di Montezemolo retired the club's appeal to the Regional Administrative Court (TAR) of Lazio, a controversial renounce, for which Montezemolo and Elkann were thanked by then FIFA and CONI presidents, Sepp Blatter and Gianni Petrucci, and that could have cleared the club's name and avoid relegation, after FIFA and UEFA threatened to suspend the Italian Football Federation (FIGC) from international play.

After being absolved as a club in the first justice proceedings, the Calciopoli trials that came during Agnelli's presidency confirmed the acquittal for the club, which was not liable by other Italian football clubs, because the 2004–06 leagues were regular. This led to a dispute between Juventus, the FIGC, and Inter Milan, the club that controversially received the 2006 scudetto but was later charged of sporting illicit when it was time-barred by the statute of limitations in 2011; citing disparità di trattamento (disparity of treatment), Juventus asked the two scudetti back and sued the FIGC for €443 million for damages caused by their 2006 relegation. Then-FIGC president Carlo Tavecchio offered to discuss reinstatement of the lost scudetti in exchange for Juventus dropping the lawsuit. Nonetheless, Agnelli was also the promoter of what was widely labelled "the table of peace" of the 2010s. Juventus continued to present new appeals for the two scudetti and the FIGC's damage claims; these appeals were declared inadmissible mostly by competence purposes.

In September 2012, Agnelli became the Italian member of the European Club Association (ECA). On 24 July 2014, he became the director of the Lega Nazionale Professionisti Serie A, and was nominated to be board member of the Foundation for General Mutuality in Professional Team Sports. He initially said he would retire his Lega Serie A candidacy if Tavecchio was elected FIGC president. On 8 September 2015, Agnelli was reelected as a member of the ECA executive board. He was also appointed by the executive board to join the UEFA Executive Committee on behalf of the association to represent its 220 member clubs alongside reelected chairman Karl-Heinz Rummenigge for 2015–17. He was reelected in 2019. In April 2021, Agnelli resigned from his positions as ECA chairman and UEFA Executive Committee to become a vice-chairman of The Super League, a company established with the aim to create the European Super League, an independent European football competition; this project, which was strongly opposed by UEFA, placed Agnelli with Joan Laporta of Barcelona and Florentino Pérez of Real Madrid, the three remaining main supporters of the Super League, in contrast with the continental football confederation.

In April 2022, the FIGC's Federal court acquitted Juventus and other clubs regarding the Plusvalenze (capital gains) Serie A scandal. Ahead of the 28 October 2022 shareholders' meeting, which was later postponed first to December 2022 and then to January 2023, he wrote a letter saying that "the 21–22 financial year should be the last year in which we record direct impacts due to the pandemic ... . Juventus means competing at a high level for victory, every day and in every competition. Victory is a goal to which Juventus naturally aspires and every effort of all the men and women of Juventus will be directed towards victory, starting from the ongoing season. ... the economic-financial balance, that we lost during the pandemic years, must return to drive the club's strategic choices." On 28 November 2022, Agnelli resigned as chairman of Juventus, amid a sporting trial regarding the Plusvalenze scandal, which in the case of Juventus represented 3.6% of the club's revenues during the investigated period, related to the 2019–21 years, after the capital gains case was reopened; it was later revealed that during these years there were disagreements within the club, including self-criticism of past transfers. In the following weeks, he remained in office in prorogatio, which ended on 18 January 2023, and was succeeded by Gianluca Ferrero. He said that football is not economically sustainable and expressed his hope that the European Court of Justice would change its regulations. In thirteen seasons, Agnelli won 19 trophies with the first men's team, 10 with the first women's team, and one with the second men's team, which made it the most titled management in Juventus history.

=== Awards ===
In 2018, Agnelli was named Turinese Man of the Year by Turin's Chamber of Commerce, Industry, Agriculture, and Artisanship. In December 2020, he won a Golden Foot award; he was awarded the Golden Foot Prestige Award for the successes of Juventus under his management.

== Personal life ==
On 27 August 2005, Agnelli married Emma Winter in a Roman Catholic ceremony in Villar Perosa, Piedmont, at the church of San Pietro in Vincoli. The wedding reception was held at Villa Agnelli, Donna Marella Agnelli's estate in Villar Perosa. The couple have two children.

After the end of his marriage with Winter, which was finalized in April 2016, Agnelli has been engaged to the Turkish former model Deniz Akalin since 2015; they knew each other for several years, being the ex-wife of Francesco Calvo, the former marketing manager of Juventus. On 22 April 2017, the couple had a daughter; her godfather was the incumbent president of UEFA, Aleksander Čeferin, with whom Agnelli later came in contrast regarding the European Super League project. The New York Times published a series of articles about the two and their relations. He said that Čeferin remained his daughter's godfather, and that he continued to be a person of whom he had esteem. On 31 October 2018, the couple's second daughter was born. The couple got married on 29 April 2023 in Lisciano Niccone.

== Legal issues ==
In 2014, some of Juventus' senior management, including Agnelli, were investigated by the public prosecutor's office of Turin on the management of tickets at the Juventus Stadium about the alleged infiltration of the 'Ndrangheta in the commercial management of the company's tickets, which Agnelli denied; the public ministers of Turin did not formalise criminal charges against Juventus or its members, closing the investigation three years later with a filing request as there were no links between the Juventus management and the groups and/or individual people involved in organized crime. In 2016, prosecutor Ciro Santoriello acquitted Juventus and Agnelli of false accounting charges related to the 2015–16 years; not finding any irregularity, he dismissed the case. On 18 March 2017, following the opening of a lawsuit by Giuseppe Pecoraro from the Turin Public Prosecutor's Office, Agnelli was referred by the FIGC's Attorney General along with three other club executives. On 15 September, the FIGC reformulated its allegations, excluding a presumed Mafia association from the members of the incriminated club after Pecoraro's intervention to the Antimafia Commission in April; the prosecutor asked for sanctions for the meetings of Agnelli with ultra groups and the sale of the tickets by the rest of the offenders beyond the limit allowed per person, which favoured ticket scalping. On 25 September, Agnelli was banned for one year and fined €20,000, while Juventus were fined €300,000 for selling tickets to ultras; alleged connections to organized crime were not present in the ruling. On 18 December, Agnelli's ban was lifted; he was required to pay a €100,000 fine, while the fine against Juventus doubled to €600,000.

On 20 January 2023, Agnelli was suspended for two years from holding office in Italian football as punishment for capital gain violations, amid the Plusvalenza scandal, which is related to the capital gains and false accounting, and the reopened Prisma case, which started in November 2021; a preliminary hearing for the Prisma case is scheduled for March 2023. Juventus were docked 15 points, which was unprecedented, and was harsher than the point deduction recommended by the FIGC prosecutor, who said that in the standings Juventus "must now finish behind Roma, outside the European competitions zone". Juventus denied any wrongdoing, and announced their intention to appeal against the FIGC's ruling to the Sport Guarantee Board of the Italian Olympic Committee, Italy's highest sporting court, which was made official on 30 January. Citing the Calciopoli unequal treatment, the club lawyers stated that the sentence "constitute a clear disparity of treatment against Juventus and its managers compared to any other company or member. We consider this to be a blatant injustice also for millions of fans, which we trust will soon be remedied in the next court." In a precedent case dating back to 2008 involving the 2004 budgets of Inter Milan and Milan, they were acquitted because "the fact does not constitute a crime", while Cesena were docked 3 points after repeated infringements of regulations in 2018; other cases resulted in fines. (Note: While the Plusvalenza case and its punishment is due to capital gains about footballers and their alleged inflated price, a widespread practice in the football world, the cases of Chievo and Cesena involved footballers that did not exist, in the sense that the two clubs did not enter into any contract. Their punishments were 3 and 15 points docked, respectively; the two sentences were not final and did not pass judgement, as the two companies went bankrupt. Additionally, the original punishment for Juventus was €800,000, which was significantly higher than any past punishments but was in line in capital gains resulting in fines for the companies.) Controversy ensued when videos of Santoriello, Prisma prosecutor, mocking Juventus emerged. In a 2019 conference, he said: "I admit that I am a big Napoli fan and I hate Juventus. As a fan, the important thing is Napoli. As a prosecutor I am obviously anti-Juventus, against the thieves on the pitch, and (yet) I had to write case dismissed." This prompted a reaction from the Italian Sports Minister, Andrea Abodi, and former Juventus chairman Giovanni Cobolli Gigli. In a second FIGC trial, Agnelli was banned from Italian football for 16 more months and fined €60,000.

== See also ==
- List of Juventus F.C. chairmen
- List of Juventus F.C. seasons
- List of unbeaten football club seasons
