= Maria Sole Agnelli =

Italian businesswoman and politician (1925–2025)

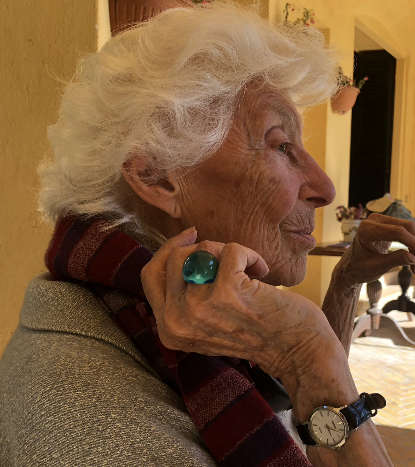
- Agnelli in 2018

Mayor of Campello sul Clitunno
- In office 1960–1970
- Preceded by: Ranieri Campello della Spina
- Succeeded by: Filippo Fratellini

Personal details
- Born: 9 August 1925 Villar Perosa, Piedmont, Kingdom of Italy
- Died: 26 December 2025 (aged 100) Fiumicino, Lazio, Italy
- Spouses: Ranieri Campello della Spina (m. 1953; died 1959) Pio Teodorani-Fabbri (m. 1964; died 2022)
- Children: 5
- Parents: Edoardo Agnelli (father); Virginia Bourbon del Monte (mother)
- Relatives: Agnelli family

Maria Sole Agnelli (9 August 1925 – 26 December 2025) was an Italian businesswoman, politician, and a major shareholder of Gianni Agnelli & Co.

== Early life ==
Agnelli was the fourth child and third daughter of Edoardo Agnelli (1892–1935) and Virginia Bourbon del Monte (1899–1945). Her siblings are Clara Agnelli (1920–2016), Gianni Agnelli (1921–2003), Susanna Agnelli (1922–2009), Cristiana Agnelli (born 1927), Giorgio Agnelli (1929–1965), and Umberto Agnelli (1934–2004). She was the granddaughter of Giovanni Agnelli (1866–1945), founder of the Italian automobile maker Fiat S.p.A.

== Political career ==
Agnelli was elected mayor of Campello sul Clitunno in 1960, a position she held until 1970 (the previous mayor was her first husband, Ranieri, Count Di Campello, mayor from 1952 until his death in 1959). She reportedly won without attending any campaign rallies, obtaining 850 votes from a pool of 1,200 voters. Her late husband's son, Rovero, followed in her footsteps, becoming mayor of Campello sul Clitunno between 1987 and 1990.

== Other activities ==
Agnelli's horse Woodland, ridden by Alessandro Argenton, won the silver medal in the Equestrian at the 1972 Summer Olympics – Individual eventing in Munich. She was the second largest stock holder of Gianni Agnelli & Co., which owns the majority of Exor and Fiat Chrysler Automobiles; she owned about 12% of the company's shares. She was the president of the Gianni Agnelli Foundation, which she resigned so that the role could be assumed by John Elkann, Agnelli's grandson.

== Later life and death ==
Agnelli married Ranieri Campello della Spina, Count of Campello sul Clitunno (1908–1959), with whom she had four children: Virginia (1954), Argenta (1955), Cintia (1956), and Bernardino (1958). Widowed after Ranieri's death in 1959, she later married Count Pio Teodorani-Fabbri (1924–2022) in 1964, with whom she had her son Eduardo (1965). Teodorani-Fabbri was related to Benito Mussolini, as Mussolini's niece had married Teodorani-Fabbri's cousin. Agnelli died on 26 December 2025, at the age of 100.
