= Clara Agnelli =

Italian socialite (1920–2016)

- Born: Clara Jeanne Agnelli; 7 April 1920; Turin, Italy
- Died: 19 July 2016 (aged 96); Venice, Italy
- Spouses: Prince Tassilo zu Fürstenberg (m. 1938; div. 19??) Giovanni Nuvoletti (m. 1974; died 2008)
- Issue: Princess Ira von Fürstenberg; Prince Egon von Fürstenberg; Prince Sebastian von Fürstenberg
- House: Agnelli (by birth); Fürstenberg (by marriage)
- Father: Edoardo Agnelli
- Mother: Virginia Bourbon del Monte

Clara Jeanne Nuvoletti (née Agnelli; 7 April 1920 – 19 July 2016), formerly Princess Clara von Fürstenberg, was an Italian socialite and heiress.

== Early life and family ==
Clara Jeanne Agnelli was born in Turin on 7 April 1920 to Edoardo Agnelli, a businessman and member of the Agnelli family, and Donna Virginia Bourbon del Monte, a noblewoman. She was the sister of Cristiana Brandolini d'Adda, Susanna Agnelli, Maria Sole Agnelli, Gianni Agnelli, Giorgio Agnelli, and Umberto Agnelli.

Her paternal grandfather, Giovanni Agnelli, was the founder of Fiat S.p.A. Her maternal grandfather was Carlo Bourbon del Monte, Prince of San Faustino.

In 1935, when Agnelli was fifteen years old, her father died in an airplane crash. Her mother died in a car accident in 1945. In November 1968, Agnelli went to the break-away state of Biafra in Nigeria to give money to secessionist leader C. Odumegwu Ojukwu on behalf of her family.

== Marriages ==
Agnelli married Prince Tassilo zu Fürstenberg in 1938, when she was 18 years old. The couple had three children, Princess Ira von Fürstenberg, Prince Egon von Fürstenberg, and Prince Sebastian von Fürstenberg.

During her marriage, Agnelli had an affair with Italian actor Giovanni Nuvoletti (1912–2008), Count Nuvoletti Perdomini, whom she had met in Sestriere when she was twelve years old. She ran off with Nuvoletti and the two were eventually arrested, as adultery was illegal in Italy at the time. She had to sign a legal document renouncing her relationship with Nuvoletti in return for an annuity. She continued on with the affair, which angered her brother Gianni Agnelli.

Once divorce was legalized in Italy, Agnelli married Nuvoletti in 1974 in a civil ceremony and moved into the Villa Papadopoli. After the death of her first husband, she and Nuvoletti had a Catholic wedding ceremony at her villa's chapel in 1989.

== Later life and death ==
Agnelli published several cook books. Nuvoletti died in 2008.

Agnelli died on 19 July 2016 at the hospital dell'Angelo di Mestre. She had a Catholic funeral at the Church of Santa Maria del Carmelo in Mestre. Her inheritance was worth €100 million.
