= List of Juventus FC chairmen =

Juventus Football Club have had overall 24 presidents and two administrative committees, some of which have been members of the club's main stakeholder group and elected since the club's foundation by the then assemblea di soci (membership assembly) through an annual meeting. Since 1949, they have been often corporate managers that were nominated in charge by the assemblea degli azionisti (stakeholders assembly).

== List ==
Here is a complete list of them from when Eugenio Canfari took over at the club in 1898, until the present day.

Name	Years
Eugenio Canfari	1897–1898
Enrico Canfari	1898–1901
Carlo Favale	1901–1902
Giacomo Parvopassu	1903–1904
Alfred Dick	1905–1906
Carlo Vittorio Varetti	1907–1910
Attilio Ubertalli	1911–1912
Giuseppe Hess	1913–1915
Gioacchino Armano; Fernando Nizza; Sandro Zambelli	1915–1918^{(cpg.)}
Corrado Corradini	1919–1920
Gino Olivetti	1920–1923
Edoardo Agnelli	1923–1935
Giovanni Mazzonis	1935–1936

Name	Years
Emilio de la Forest de Divonne	1936–1941
Pietro Dusio	1941–1947
Gianni Agnelli (also honorary chairman)	1947–1954
Enrico Craveri; Nino Cravetto; Marcello Giustiniani	1954–1955^{(int.)}
Umberto Agnelli	1955–1962
Vittore Catella	1962–1971
Giampiero Boniperti (current honorary chairman)	1971–1990
Vittorio Caissotti di Chiusano	1990–2003
Franzo Grande Stevens (current honorary chairman)	2003–2006
Giovanni Cobolli Gigli	2006–2009
Jean-Claude Blanc	2009–2010
Andrea Agnelli	2010–2023
Gianluca Ferrero	2023–present

Legend:
^{(cpg.)} Chairmanship Committee of War.
^{(int.)} Chairmen on interim charge.
