= Priscilla Rattazzi =

Italian-born American photographer

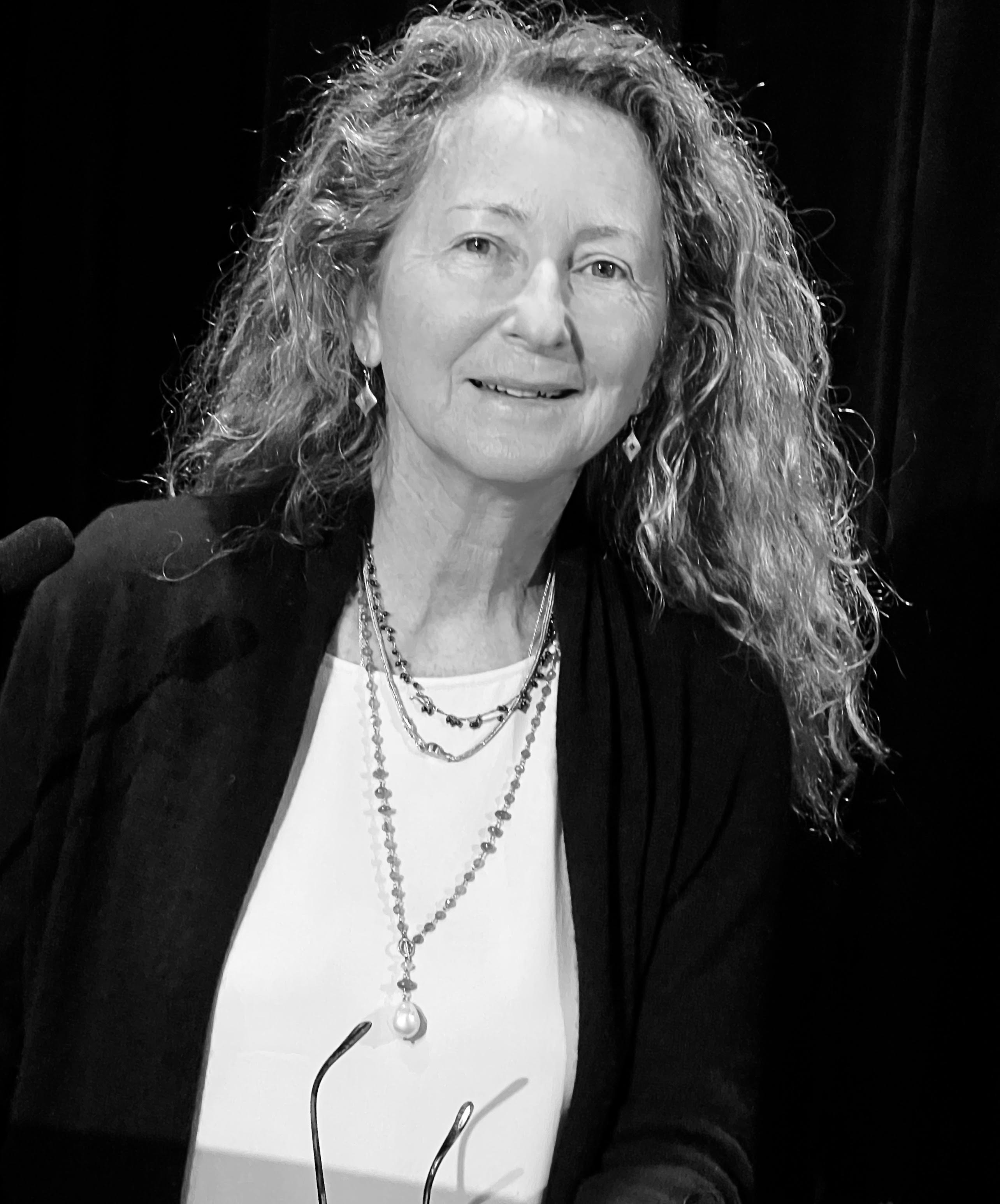
- Born: 1956 (age 69–70); Rome, Italy
- Citizenship: American-Italian
- Education: Sarah Lawrence College, UWC Atlantic College
- Occupation: Photographer
- Parent: Susanna Agnelli (mother)
- Family: Agnelli family
- Website: Official website

Priscilla Rattazzi (born 1956) is an Italian-born photographer whose work has been featured for over four decades in international magazines, galleries and museum exhibitions.

== Personal life ==
Priscilla Rattazzi was born in Rome, Italy. Her father was Count Urbano Rattazzi Jr. (1918–2012), the great-grandson of two-time Prime Minister of Italy Urbano Rattazzi of the Historical Left, and her mother was Countess Susanna Rattazzi (née Agnelli), sister of Fiat chairman Gianni Agnelli and daughter of Edoardo Agnelli and Virginia Bourbon del Monte (daughter of Carlo Bourbon del Monte, Prince di San Faustino). Through her father, she is the great-great-granddaughter of Marie Bonaparte-Wyse, a granddaughter of Lucien Bonaparte (making her Emperor Napoleon I's great-niece) by his second wife.

Rattazzi came to the United States in the early seventies. She studied photography at Sarah Lawrence College and completed her graduation in 1977. She was featured in Richard Avedon’s “Avedon: Photographs 1947-1977 along with her aunt Marella Agnelli, models Dovima and Suzy Parker, and actresses Sophia Loren, Brigitte Bardot and Elizabeth Taylor. Rattazzi has been married three times; first to film producer Alex Ponti (m.1980; annul.1982) then to German investment banker Claus Moehlmann (m. 1984; div.1990) and to education entrepreneur Chris Whittle (m.1990; div.2022). She is the mother of three children, Maximilian Moehlmann, Andrea Whittle and Sasha Whittle.

== Career ==
Rattazzi worked as an assistant to photographer Hiro from 1977 to 1978, then became a fashion and portrait photographer in New York throughout the 1980’s. Her photographs were published in Brides, Self, Redbook, New York and The New York Times Magazine. In Italy, her work appeared in Vogue Italia, Donna and Amica. Rattazzi has authored five books and one limited-edition portfolio. She has been the recipient of ten one-woman gallery exhibitions, and one museum show. Her latest show, HOODOOLAND (Staley-Wise gallery 2020), was featured in The New York Times, as well as in Town & Country, AirMail and La Repubblica. In January 2022, Rattazzi was an invited speaker at The Society of The Four Arts in Palm Beach, Florida. In July 2023, Rattazzi's photographs of three Linden trees on her property in East Hampton were featured in an exhibition at the Peter Marino Art Foundation in Southampton, N.Y. The photographs formed the basis of her latest book, Three Lindens.

Books:

- “Una Famiglia” was Priscilla’s first book. It was privately printed for her mother’s 60th birthday and was a family album of the Agnelli family.

Published books:

- “Best Friends” is a collection of photographs of people with their dogs (Rizzoli, 1989)
- “Children” is a collection of photographs of children in early childhood (Rizzoli, 1992)
- “Georgica Pond” is a ten-year examination of a body of water on the East End of Long Island (Callaway, 2000)
- “Luna & Lola” is the story of Priscilla's two dogs, a golden retriever and a dachshund; a metaphorical tale of family life (Callaway, 2010)
- "Three Lindens" describes, through photographs, how turning to nature and making art helped Rattazzi endure a personal crisis (The Peter Marino Art Foundation, 2023)

Museum and gallery shows:

- Staley-Wise Gallery, New York. In conjunction with the publication of her book Best Friends (1989)
- Knoxville Museum of Art, Knoxville, Tennessee (1992)
- Glenn Horowitz Bookseller, East Hampton, New York (2003)
- Jack Banning Gallery, New York. A series of portraits of actors, producers and directors for the Tribeca Film Festival (2003)
- Valentina Moncada Gallery, Rome, Italy (2004)
- East End Books and Gallery, East Hampton, New York (2006)
- Paul Fisher Gallery, West Palm Beach, Florida (2008)
- Ralph Lauren stores in East Hampton and Milan. In conjunction with the launch of her book Luna & Lola (2010)
- Staley-Wise Gallery, New York. “Selected Photographs”: 1975-2013 (2014)
- Staley-Wise Gallery, New York. “HOODOOLAND”, a series of photographs of rock formations taken in 2018-2019 around Grand Staircase-Escalante National Monument, Utah. (2020)
- The Peter Marino Art Foundation, Southampton, N.Y. "Three Lindens", a series of photographs that capture the joy, grief and turmoil surrounding the end of Rattazzi's family's life at her historic estate on Georgica Pond in East Hampton, N.Y. (2023)
