= Cristiana Brandolini d'Adda =

Italian socialite (1927–2026)

- Countess of Valmareno
- Born: Cristiana Agnelli; 16 February 1927; Turin, Italy
- Died: 23 June 2026 (aged 99); Venice, Italy
- Spouses: Brandolino Brandolini d'Adda, Conte di Valmareno (m. 1947; died 2005)
- Issue: 4 sons
- Father: Edoardo Agnelli
- Mother: Virginia Bourbon del Monte

Cristiana Brandolini d'Adda, Contessa di Valmareno (née Agnelli; 16 February 1927 – 23 June 2026) was an Italian socialite. She was a member of the wealthy Agnelli family by birth and the noble Brandolini family by marriage.

== Background ==
Cristiana Agnelli was born on 16 February 1927 in Turin. Her father was Edoardo Agnelli, an industrialist, and her mother was Donna Virginia Bourbon del Monte, a noblewoman. Her paternal grandfather, Giovanni Agnelli, founded Fiat S.p.A. Her maternal grandfather was Carlo Bourbon del Monte, Prince of San Faustino.

She was the fifth of seven children. Her sisters were Princess Clara von Fürstenberg, Countess Susanna Rattazzi, and Countess Maria Sole. Her brothers were Gianni Agnelli, Giorgio Agnelli, and Umberto Agnelli. Agnelli's father died in a plane crash when she was eight years old, and her mother died in a car accident when she was eighteen years old. One of her granddaughters is Coco Brandolini d'Adda, whose mother was the ambassador of the Valentino style to the world and whose sister Bianca Brandolini d'Adda had an on-off relationship with Lapo Elkann, and her father descended from Philip IV of France and Maria Theresa of Austria.

== Career ==
Brandolini d'Adda was photographed by Cecil Beaton in 1951. She was added to the International Best Dressed List in 1973 as an "outstanding example of elegance without ostentation", and she was elevated to the International Best-Dressed Hall of Fame in 1975. She was noted for her style and taste in both fashion and decorating.

== Personal life and death ==
At the age of 19, Agnelli moved to Rome with her sister Susanna to study art. At a party in Cortina d'Ampezzo, where she was visiting her sister Clara, she met Brandolino Brandolini d'Adda, Count of Valmareno, nicknamed Brando. He was the son of Carlo Brandolini d'Adda, Count of Valmareno, the president of the Municipal Company of Lagoon Waterborne Transport, and Maria José Alvares Pereira de Melo. In 1947, they were married in a Catholic ceremony at the Basilica of St. Bartholomew on the Island, Tiber Island, in Rome. Upon marriage, Agnelli became Countess Brandolini d'Adda of Valmareno.

Her husband was a descendant of Brandolino Brandolini, and of Erasmo Stefano of Narni by marriage of Brandolino's son Tiberto to Erasmo's daughter. Brandolino and Erasmo were close friends, and in memory of this friendship, the coat of arms of the Brandolini family still bears the depiction of the braids of the famous captain of Narni. They had four sons: Tiberto, who was nicknamed Ruy, Leonello, Nuno, and Brandino. Tiberto would go on to marry Princess Georgina de Faucigny-Lucinge et Coligny, Nuno married Muriel Phan van Thiet, and Brandino married Marie Angliviel de la Beaumelle (1963–2013).

The couple owned homes in Venice (Palazzo Giustinian), Paris, and Geneva but mainly spent time at their country estate, Vistorta. Her husband died in 2005, at the age of 85.

Brandolini d'Adda died on 23 June 2026, at the age of 99.
