= Edoardo Agnelli Islamic Association =

Islamic organization of Iran

Edoardo Agnelli Islamic Association (Anjoman-e Eslami-ye shahid Edoardo Agnelli) is an Islamic association established in Iran and named after Edoardo Agnelli the Italian convert and the oldest son of Gianni Agnelli. The association was founded in 2005 in Isfahan city in central Iran, and consists of Iranian youth working in order to introduce the real image of Islam to the world and share the stories and thoughts of the converts.

== Activities ==
The NGO holds ceremonies in commemoration of Agnelli every year on his death anniversary on 15 November. It also holds religious, cultural and political exhibitions, and works in social media and Rahyafte website in Persian, English, Spanish and Arabic.
