= History of Juventus FC =

Italian football club history

The history of Juventus F.C. covers over 120 years of association football from the club based in Turin, Italy, and established in 1897 that would eventually become the most successful team in the history of Italian football and amongst the elite football clubs of the world. Iuventūs is Latin for "youth". According to the International Federation of Football History & Statistics, an international organization recognized by FIFA, Juventus were Italy's best club of the 20th century and the second most successful European club in the same period.

== Early years (1897–1918) ==
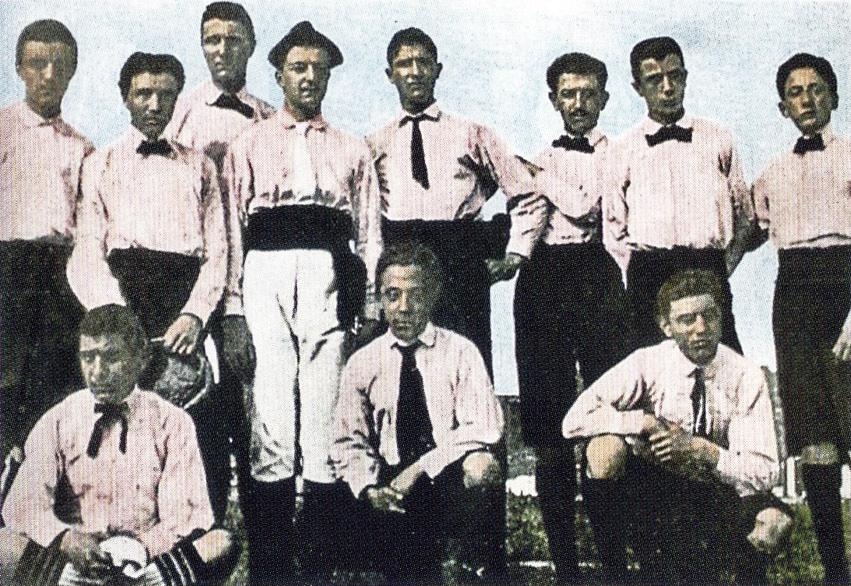
The first ever Juventus club shot, circa 1897 to 1898

In 1896, a brigade of students from the Liceo d'Azeglio used to set off, after the afternoon elections were over, towards Corso Duca di Genova and then, having put down their books on a bench, dedicate themselves to playing 'barra'. Foot-ball was introduced later: it had already been played first at the Valentino skating rink and then in Piazza d'Armi by some foreigners living in Turin who had founded FC Internazionale, later changing to FC Torinese. With so many initiatives a club was needed and in the autumn of 1897 it was decided to found it. Here began the true origins of Juventus...

— Enrico Canfari

In the late 19th century, football began to take hold throughout Europe. In 1896, some students of the third and fourth class of the Liceo Classico Massimo d'Azeglio in Turin would gather after class around a bench not far from their school, opposite the Platti confectionery, towards what is now Corso Re Umberto, on the corner of Corso Vittorio Emanuele II. They would discuss sport, especially football, and started to play it, so much so that the following year they founded a civil society "for fun, for enjoyment, for desire of novelty". The society's founding date is unknown; conventionally, the date of 1 November 1897 is used. Its first meeting took place was held in the backroom of the Canfari brothers' bicycle workshop, at 42, Corso Re Umberto. During the meeting, there was a vote to decide the name of the society where Sport-Club Juventus was chosen. Enrico Canfari described the vote as follows:

On one side were the Latinophobes, on the other the classicists, and to a lesser extent the democrats. Three names were put forward for the vote: 'Società Via Fort', 'Società Sportiva Massimo d'Azeglio' and 'Sport-Club Juventus'. Few people sympathised with the latter, which is why it succeeded. Among the opponents was me: it seemed to me that 'Juventus' no longer suited mature members. I was wrong: at 'Juventus' it is not possible to grow old, [...] instead 'Juventus' grows old. And so the company was christened 'Sport-Club Juventus'.

— Enrico Canfari

Juventus' first headquarters was located in Via Montevecchio in 1898. However, the increase of members forced it to change its headquarters to 4, Via Piazzi. The following year, Juventus changed name to Foot-Ball Club Juventus. Canfari described the reason for that:

From that time on, our sporting purpose became more clearly defined and foot[-]ball alone occupied our activities; and the former name of Sport-Club Juventus was replaced by the present 'Foot-Ball Club Juventus' or simply Juventus. This name was, as you can now see, truly fortunate, since there are many sports clubs with the same name as ours, but the real Juventus is only one: ours.

— Enrico Canfari

On 11 June 1899, Juventus' first documented friendly match took place, against the representative of the Germano Sommelier Technical Institute.

Juventus was founded as Sport-Club Juventus in late 1897 by pupils from the Massimo d'Azeglio Lyceum school in Turin, among them Eugenio Canfari and Enrico Canfari. It was renamed as Foot-Ball Club Juventus two years later. The club joined the 1900 Italian Football Championship. Juventus played their first Italian Football Championship match on 11 March 1900 in a 1–0 defeat against Torinese. During this period, the team wore a pink and black kit, but since 1901–02 season the club colours have changed to black and white stripes, inspired by English side Notts County.

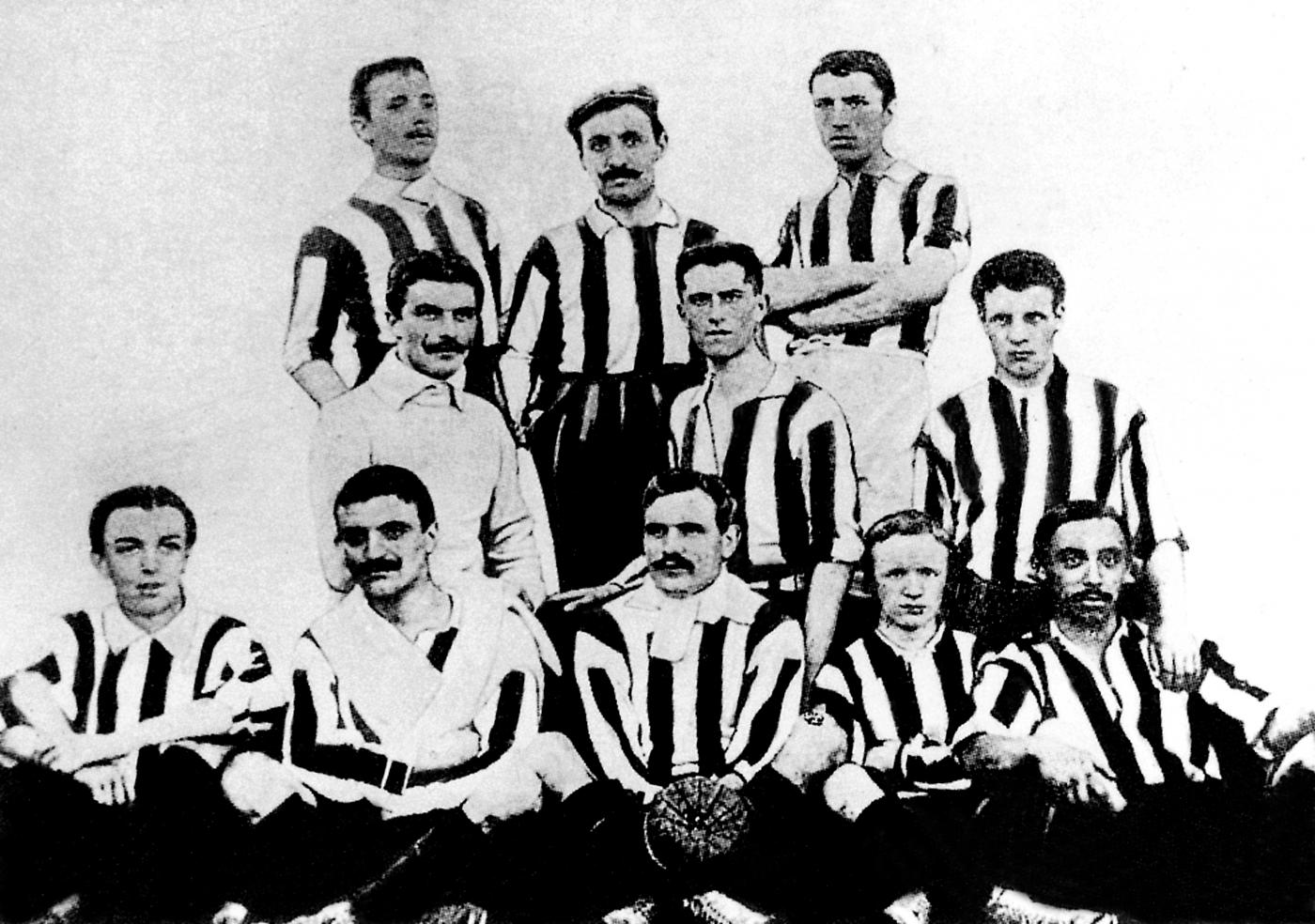
The Juventus team during the 1905 season in which they won their first league title

In 1904, businessman Marco Ajmone-Marsan revived the finances of Juventus, making it possible to transfer the training field from piazza d'armi to the more appropriate Velodrome Umberto I. Juventus first won the 1905 Italian Football Championship while playing at their Velodrome Umberto I ground.

There was a split at the club in 1906, after some of the staff considered moving Juve out of Turin. Alfred Dick, the club's president, (Note: Frédéric Dick, a son of Alfred Dick, was a Swiss footballer and joined the team of the Juventus that won the tournament of the Second Category in 1905.) was unhappy with this, and left with some prominent players to found FBC Torino, which in turn spawned the Derby della Mole. Juventus spent much of this period steadily rebuilding after the split, surviving the First World War.

== League dominance (1923–1980) ==
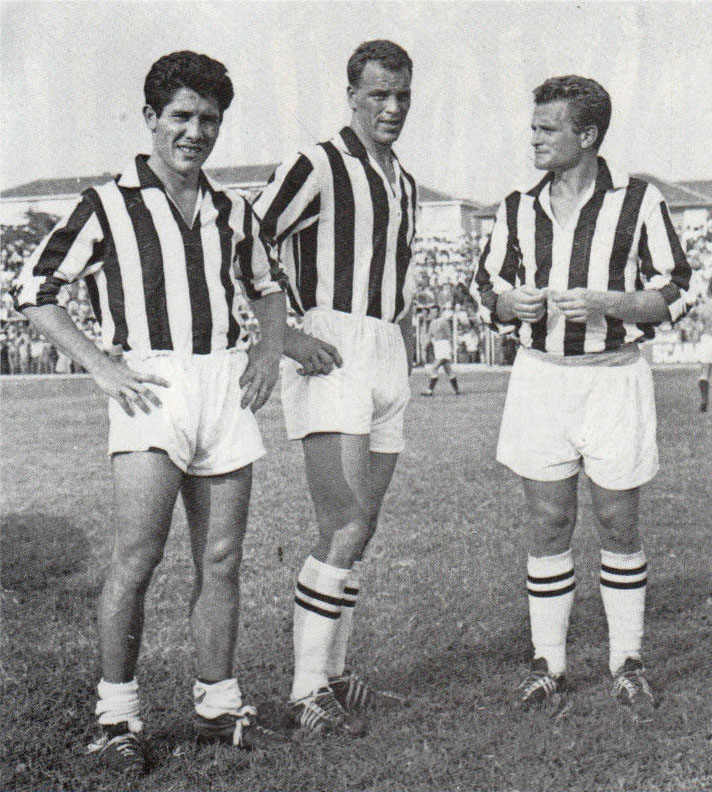
The "Magical Trio" (Trio Magico) of Omar Sívori, John Charles, and Giampiero Boniperti in 1957

FIAT vicepresident Edoardo Agnelli was elected club's president in 1923 and a new stadium was inaugurated one year before. This helped the club to its second league championship in the 1925–26 Prima Divisione, after beating Alba Roma in a two-legged final with an aggregate score of 12–1. The club established itself as a major force in Italian football since the 1930s, becoming the country's first professional club and the first with a decentralised fan base, which led it to win a record of five consecutive Italian football championships and form the core of the Italy national football team during the Vittorio Pozzo's era, including the 1934 FIFA World Cup champions, with star players like Raimundo Orsi, Luigi Bertolini, Giovanni Ferrari, and Luis Monti, among others. As of 2022, it is the club with the most FIFA World Cup champions at 27.

Juventus moved to the Stadio Comunale, but for the rest of the 1930s and the majority of the 1940s they were unable to recapture championship dominance. After the Second World War, Gianni Agnelli was appointed president. In the late 1940s and early 1950s, the club added two more league championships to its name, winning the 1949–50 Serie A under the management of Englishman Jesse Carver, and then repeating in the 1951–52 Serie A. For the 1957–58 Serie A, two new strikers, Welshman John Charles and Italian Argentine Omar Sívori, were signed to play alongside longtime member Giampiero Boniperti. In the 1959–60 Juventus F.C. season, they beat Fiorentina to complete their first league and cup double, winning the 1959–60 Serie A and the 1960 Coppa Italia final. Boniperti retired in 1961 as the all-time top scorer at the club, with 182 goals in all competitions, a club record that stood for 45 years.

During the rest of the decade, the club only won the 1966–67 Serie A. The 1970s saw Juventus further solidify their strong position in Italian football, and under former player Čestmír Vycpálek they won the scudetto in the 1971–72 Serie A, and followed through in the 1972–73 Serie A, with players like as Roberto Bettega, Franco Causio, and José Altafini breaking through. During the rest of the decade, they won the league thrice more, with defender Gaetano Scirea contributing significantly. The latter two success in Serie A was under Giovanni Trapattoni, who also led the club to their first ever major European title, the 1976–77 UEFA Cup, and helped the club's domination continue on into the early part of the 1980s.

== European stage (1980–1993) ==

1985 European Cup final starting lineup

The Trapattoni era was highly successful in the 1980s and the club started the decade off well, winning the league title three more times by 1984. This meant Juventus had won 20 Italian league titles and were allowed to add a second golden star to their shirt, becoming the only Italian club to achieve this. Around this time, the club's players were attracting considerable attention, and Paolo Rossi was named European Footballer of the Year following his contribution to Italy's victory in the 1982 FIFA World Cup, where he was named Player of the Tournament.

Frenchman Michel Platini was awarded the European Footballer of the Year title for a record three consecutive years (1983, 1984 and 1985). Juventus are the first and one of the only two clubs to have players from their club winning the award in four consecutive years. (Note: The other club was Barcelona with its captain, the Argentinian star Lionel Messi. Messi was awarded Ballon d'Or for four consecutive years (2009 to 20130.) It was Platini who scored the winning goal in the 1985 European Cup final against Liverpool; this was marred by the Heysel Stadium disaster, which changed European football. That year, Juventus became the first club in the history of European football to have won all three major UEFA competitions; after their triumph in the 1985 Intercontinental Cup, the club also became the first and thus far the only in association football history to have won all five possible confederation competitions, an achievement that it revalidated with a sixth title won in the 1999 UEFA Intertoto Cup.

With the exception of winning the closely contested 1985–86 Serie A, the rest of the 1980s were not very successful for the club. As well as having to contend with Diego Maradona's Napoli, both of the Milanese clubs, A.C. Milan and Inter Milan, won Italian championships; Juventus achieved a double by winning the 1989–90 Coppa Italia and the 1990 UEFA Cup final under the guidance of former club legend Dino Zoff. In 1990, Juventus also moved into their new home, the Stadio delle Alpi, which was built for the 1990 FIFA World Cup. Despite the arrival of Italian star Roberto Baggio later that year for a world football transfer record fee, the early 1990s under Luigi Maifredi and subsequently Trapattoni once again also saw little success for Juventus, as they only managed to win the 1993 UEFA Cup final.

== Renewed international success (1994–2004) ==

1996 Champions League final starting lineup

Marcello Lippi took over as Juventus manager at the start of the 1994–95 Serie A. His first season at the helm of the club was a successful one, as Juventus recorded their first Serie A championship title since the mid-1980s, as well as the 1995 Coppa Italia final. The crop of players during this period featured Ciro Ferrara, Roberto Baggio, Gianluca Vialli, and a young Alessandro Del Piero. Lippi led Juventus to the 1995 Supercoppa Italiana and the 1995–96 UEFA Champions League, beating Ajax on penalties after a 1–1 draw in which Fabrizio Ravanelli scored for Juventus.

The club did not rest long after winning the European Cup, as more highly regarded players were brought into the fold in the form of Zinedine Zidane, Filippo Inzaghi, and Edgar Davids. At home, Juventus won the 1996–97 Serie A, successfully defended their title in the 1997–98 Serie A, won the 1996 UEFA Super Cup, and followed through with the 1996 Intercontinental Cup. Juventus reached two consecutive Champions League finals during this period but lost out to Borussia Dortmund and Real Madrid, respectively in 1997 and 1998.

After a two-and-a-half-season absence, Lippi returned to the club in 2001, following his replacement Carlo Ancelotti's dismissal, signing big name players like Gianluigi Buffon, David Trezeguet, Pavel Nedvěd, and Lilian Thuram, helping the team to win the 2001–02 Serie A, which was their first since 1998, and confirmed themselves in the 2002–03 Serie A. Juventus were also part of the all Italian 2003 UEFA Champions League final but lost out to Milan on penalties after the game ended in a 0–0 draw. At the conclusion of the following season, Lippi was appointed as the Italy national team's head coach, bringing an end to one of the most fruitful managerial spells in Juventus' history.

== Calciopoli scandal (2004–2007) ==
Fabio Capello was appointed as Juventus' coach in 2004 and led the club to two more consecutive Serie A first places. In May 2006, Juventus emerged as one of the five clubs linked to the Calciopoli scandal. In July, Juventus was placed at the bottom of the league table and relegated to Serie B for the first time in its history. The club was also stripped of the 2004–05 Serie A title, while the 2005–06 Serie A winner, after a period sub judice, was declared to be third-placed Inter Milan. This remains a much debated and controversial issue, particularly due to Inter Milan's possible revealed involvement, the 2004 championship (the sole being investigated) deemed regular and not fixed, Juventus being absolved as club in the ordinary justice proceedings, their renounce to the Italian civil courts appeal, which could have cleared the club's name and avoid relegation, after FIFA threatened to suspend the Italian Football Federation (FIGC) and barring all Italian clubs from international play, and the motivations, such as sentimento popolare (people's feelings), and the newly created ad-hoc rule used to relegate the club.

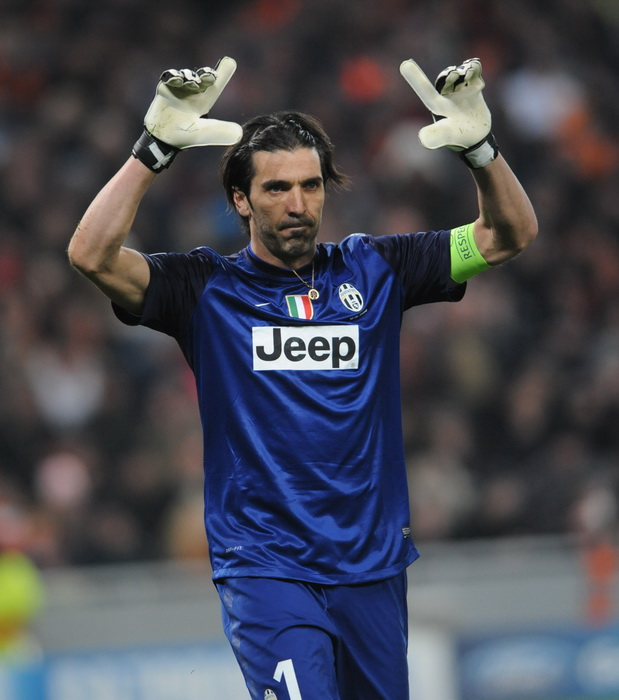
Star goalkeeper Gianluigi Buffon was among a group of players who remained with the club following their demotion to Serie B in 2006.

Many key players left following their relegation to Serie B, including Thuram, star striker Zlatan Ibrahimović, midfielders Emerson and Patrick Vieira, and defensive stalwarts Fabio Cannavaro and Gianluca Zambrotta; other big name players, such as Del Piero, Buffon, Trezeguet, and Nedvěd, as well as the club's future defense core Giorgio Chiellini, remained to help the club return to Serie A, while youngsters from the Campionato Nazionale Primavera (youth team), such as Sebastian Giovinco and Claudio Marchisio, were integrated into the first team. Juventus won the Cadetti title (Serie B championship) despite starting with a points deduction and gained promotion straight back up to the top division, with Del Piero claiming the top scorer award with 21 goals, as league winners after the 2006–07 Serie B season.

As early as 2010, when many other clubs were implicated and Inter Milan, Livorno, and Milan liable of direct Article 6 violations in the 2011 Palazzi Report, Juventus considered challenging the stripping of their scudetto from 2005 and the non-assignment of the 2006 title, dependent on the results of Calciopoli trials connected to the 2006 scandal. When former general manager Luciano Moggi's conviction in criminal court in connection with the scandal was partially written off by the Supreme Court in March 2015, the club sued the FIGC for €443 million for damages caused by their 2006 relegation. Then-FIGC president Carlo Tavecchio offered to discuss reinstatement of the lost scudetti in exchange for Juventus dropping the lawsuit.

In September 2015, the Supreme Court released a 150-page document that explained its final ruling of the case, based on the controversial 2006 sports ruling, which did not take in consideration the other clubs involved because they could not be put on trial due to the statute of limitations, and it would be necessary to request and open a revocation of judgment pursuant to Article 39 of the Code of Sports Justice. Despite his remaining charges being cancelled without a new trial due to statute of limitations, the court confirmed that Moggi was actively involved in the sporting fraud, which was intended to favour Juventus and increase his own personal benefits according to La Gazzetta dello Sport. As did the Naples court in 2012, the court commented that the developments and behavior of other clubs and executives were not investigated in depth. Once they exhausted their appeals in Italy's courts, both Moggi and Giraudo appealed to the European Court of Human Rights in March 2020; Giraudo's was accepted in September 2021. Juventus continued to present new appeals, which were declared inadmissible.

== Return to Serie A (2007–2011) ==
After making their comeback for the 2007–08 Serie A, Juventus appointed Claudio Ranieri as manager. They finished in third place in their first season back in the top flight and qualified for the 2008–09 UEFA Champions League's third qualifying round in the preliminary stages. Juventus reached the group stages, where they beat Real Madrid in both home and away legs, before losing in the knockout round to Chelsea. Ranieri was sacked following a string of unsuccessful results and Ciro Ferrara was appointed as manager on a temporary basis for the last two games of the 2008–09 Serie A, before being subsequently appointed as the manager for the 2009–10 Serie A.

Ferrara's stint as Juventus manager proved to be unsuccessful, with Juventus knocked out of 2009–10 UEFA Champions League, and also of the 2009–10 Coppa Italia, as well as just lying on the sixth place in the league table at the end of January 2010, leading to the dismissal of Ferrara and the naming of Alberto Zaccheroni as caretaker manager. Zaccheroni could not help the side improve, as Juventus finished the season in seventh place in Serie A. For the 2010–11 Serie A, Jean-Claude Blanc was replaced by Andrea Agnelli as the club's president. Agnelli's first action was to replace Zaccheroni and director of sport Alessio Secco with Sampdoria manager Luigi Delneri and director of sport Giuseppe Marotta. Delneri failed to improve their fortunes and was dismissed, and former player and fan favourite Antonio Conte, fresh after winning promotion with Siena, was named as Delneri's replacement. In September 2011, Juventus relocated to the new Juventus Stadium, known as the Allianz Stadium since 2017.

== Nine consecutive scudetti (2011–2020) ==
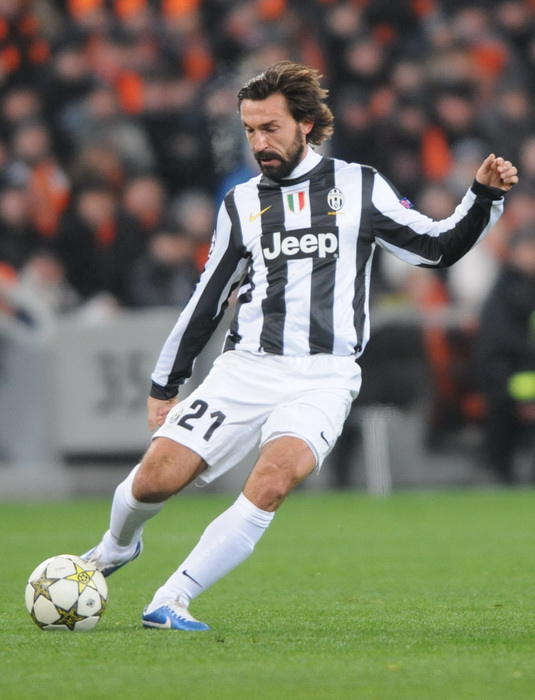
Playmaker Andrea Pirlo playing for Juventus in 2012

With Conte as manager, Juventus were unbeaten for the entire 2011–12 Serie A season. Towards the second half of the season, the team was mostly competing with northern rivals Milan for first place in a tight contest. Juventus won the title on the 37th matchday after beating Cagliari 2–0 and Milan losing to Inter 4–2. After a 3–1 win in the final matchday against Atalanta, Juventus became the first team to go the season unbeaten in the current 38-game format. In 2013–14 Serie A, Juventus won a third consecutive scudetto with a record 102 points and 33 wins. The title was the 30th official league championship in the club's history. They also achieved the semi-finals of 2013–14 UEFA Europa League, where they were eliminated at home against ten-man Benfica's catenaccio, missing the 2014 UEFA Europa League final at the Juventus Stadium.

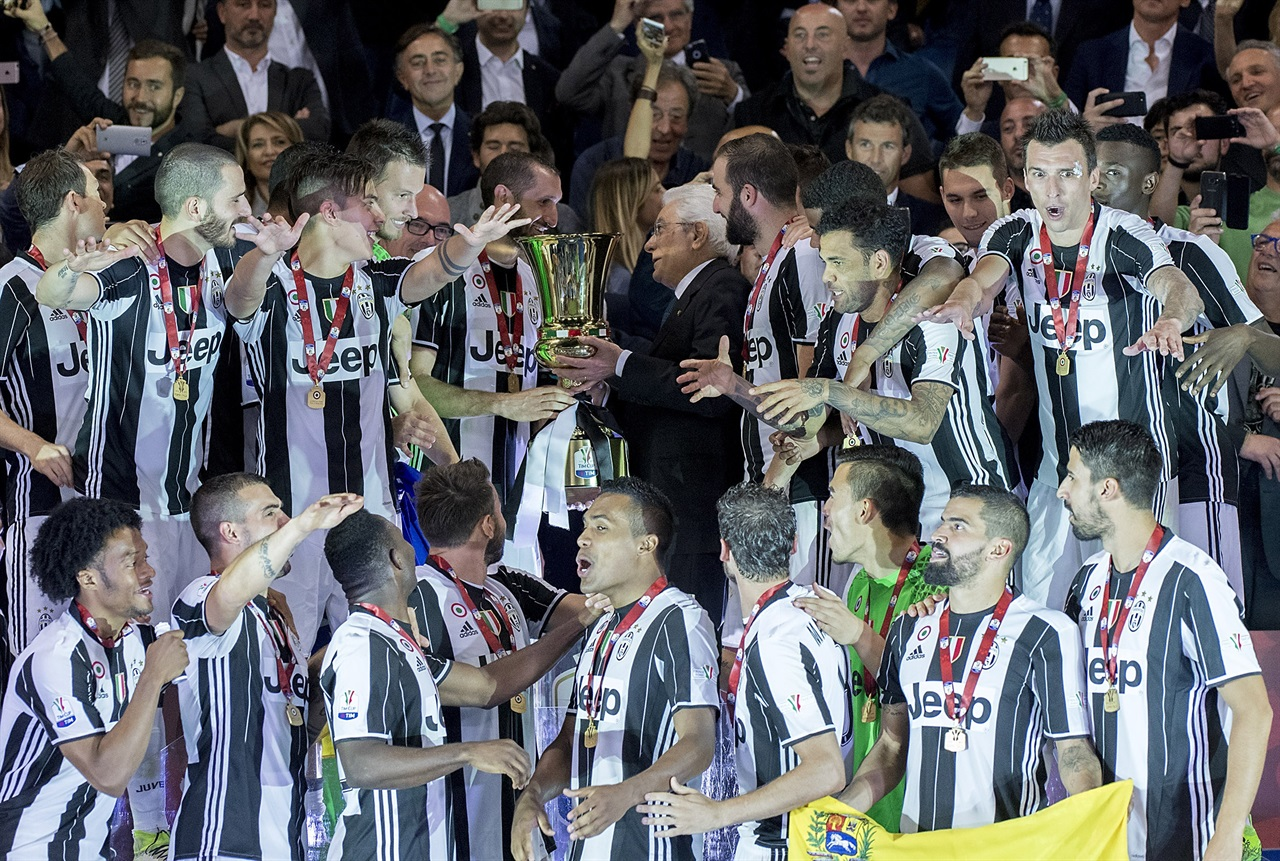
Juventus captain Giorgio Chiellini receiving the 2016–17 Coppa Italia from Sergio Mattarella, the president of Italy

In the 2014–15 Serie A, Massimiliano Allegri was appointed as manager, with whom Juventus won their 31st official title, making it a fourth-straight, as well as achieving a record tenth Coppa Italia, after beating Lazio 2–2 in the 2015 Coppa Italia final, for the domestic double. The club also beat Real Madrid 3–2 on aggregate in the semi-finals of the 2014–15 UEFA Champions League to face Barcelona in the 2015 UEFA Champions League final in Berlin for the first time since the 2002–03 UEFA Champions League. Juventus lost the final against Barcelona 3–1. In the 2016 Coppa Italia final, the club won the title for the 11th time and second straight win, becoming the first team in Italy's history to win Serie A and Coppa Italia doubles in back-to-back seasons.

In the 2017 Coppa Italia final, Juventus won their 12th Coppa Italia title in a 2–0 win over Lazio, becoming the first team to win three consecutive titles. Four days later on 21 May, Juventus became the first team to win six consecutive Serie A titles. In the 2017 UEFA Champions League final, their second Champions League final in three years, Juventus were defeated 1–4 by defending champions Real Madrid; the 2017 Turin stampede happened ten minutes before the end of the match. In the 2018 Coppa Italia final, Juventus won their 13th overall title (fourth consecutive win) in a 4–0 win over Milan, extending the all-time record of successive Coppa Italia titles. Juventus then secured their seventh consecutive Serie A title, extending the all-time record of successive triumphs in the competition. In the 2018 Supercoppa Italiana, which was held in January 2019, Juventus and Milan, who were tied for Supercoppa Italiana wins with seven each, played against each other; Juventus won their eight title after beating Milan 1–0. In April 2019, Juventus secured their eighth consecutive Serie A title, further extending the all-time record of successive triumphs in the competition. Following Allegri's departure, Maurizio Sarri was appointed manager of the club ahead of the 2019–20 Juventus F.C. season. Juventus were confirmed 2019–20 Serie A champions, reaching an unprecedented milestone of nine consecutive league titles.

== Recent history (2020–present) ==
On 8 August 2020, Sarri was sacked from his managerial position, one day after Juventus were eliminated from the 2019–20 UEFA Champions League by Lyon. On the same day, former player Andrea Pirlo was announced as the new coach, signing a two-year contract. In the 2020 Supercoppa Italiana, which was held in January 2021, Juventus won their ninth title after a 2–0 victory against Napoli. With Inter Milan's win of the 2020–21 Serie A, Juventus' run of nine consecutive titles came to an end; the club managed to secure a fourth-place finish on the final day of the league, granting Juventus qualification to the following season's Champions League. In the 2021 Coppa Italia final, Juventus won their 14th title. On 28 May, Juventus sacked Pirlo from his managerial position, and announced Allegri's return to the club as manager after two years away from management on a four-year contract. After losing 4–2 after extra time to Inter Milan in the 2022 Coppa Italia final, the 2021–22 Juventus F.C. season marked the first season since 2010–11 in which the club had not won a trophy.

In the 2022–23 season, Juventus made only three Champions League group stage points—their lowest-ever group stage score in the competition—after one victory and five defeats. The team placed third in the group stage and obtained qualification to the Europa League for their better goal difference with Israelian side Maccabi Haifa; they were eventually defeated 2–1 by Sevilla after extra time at the Ramón Sánchez Pizjuán Stadium in the Europa League semi-final in May 2023. On 28 November 2022, the entire board of directors resigned from their respective positions, Andrea Agnelli as president, Pavel Nedvěd as vice president, and Maurizio Arrivabene as CEO. Agnelli's presidency was the most victorious of the club's history, with 19 titles won. Exor, the club's controlling shareholder, appointed Gianluca Ferrero as its new chairman ahead of the shareholders' meeting on 18 January 2023. Two days later, after being acquitted by the FIGC's Court of Appeal in April–May 2022, Juventus were deducted 15 points as punishment for capital gain violations, as part of an investigation related to the 2019–2021 budgets during the COVID-19 pandemic starting in November 2021. This was harsher than the point deduction recommended by the FIGC prosecutor, who said that in the standings Juventus "must now finish behind Roma, outside the European Cup area". The penalty caused an uproar and protests among Juventus supporters, who cancelled, or threatened to do so, their Sky Sport and DAZN subscriptions. The decision had initially been reversed on 20 April 2023, but Juventus received a new penalty, this time of ten points, on 22 May.

== See also ==
- Football records in Italy
- Nazio-Juve
- Timeline of association football
- UEFA club competition records and statistics

== Bibliography ==
- Canfari, Enrico (1915). Storia del Foot-Ball Club Juventus di Torino [History of the Foot-Ball Club Juventus of Turin] (in Italian). Turin: Tipografia Artale.
- "Football Philosophers" (PDF). The Technician. 46. Union des Associations Européennes de Football (UEFA). May 2010.
- Glanville, Brian (2005). The Story of the World Cup. London: Faber and Faber. ISBN 0-571-22944-1.
- Goldblatt, David (2007). The Ball is Round: A Global History of Football. London: Penguin. ISBN 978-0-14-101582-8.
- Hazard, Patrick; Gould, David (2001). Fear and loathing in world football. Berg Publishers. ISBN 1-85973-463-4.
- Papa, Antonio; Panico, Guido (1993). Storia sociale del calcio in Italia (in Italian). Bologna: Il Mulino. p. 271. ISBN 88-15-08764-8.
