= Giovanni Alberto Agnelli =

Italian businessman (1964–1997)

- Born: 19 April 1964; Milan, Italy
- Died: 13 December 1997 (aged 33); Turin, Italy
- Education: The McCallie School; Brown University
- Spouse: Frances Avery Howe
- Parents: Umberto Agnelli; Antonella Bechi Piaggio
- Relatives: Gianni Agnelli (uncle)

Giovanni Alberto Agnelli (19 April 1964 – 13 December 1997), colloquially known as Giovannino Agnelli, was an Italian businessman and member of the Agnelli family, an Italian industrial dynasty associated with Fiat S.p.A. Agnelli's father was politician and industrialist Umberto Agnelli; his uncle was Fiat head Gianni Agnelli. Prior to his 1997 death at age 33, he was the heir apparent and designated future chairman of the Fiat Group. Agnelli's reputation among the Italian public was comparable to that of John F. Kennedy Jr. in the United States; in the words of Alan Friedman, he was "rich, strikingly handsome, always smiling and the leading voice of his generation."

== Early life ==
Giovanni Alberto Agnelli was born on 19 April 1964, in Milan, Italy, to Umberto Agnelli and Antonella Bechi Piaggio. Both sides of his family were associated with the motor vehicle industry; his paternal great–grandfather was Giovanni Agnelli, founder of Fiat, while his mother's stepfather was Enrico Piaggio, son of Piaggio founder Rinaldo Piaggio. In 1969, he attended elementary school at Collegio San Giuseppe in Turin, where all the Agnellis studied. Agnelli's parents divorced in 1974; the young Agnelli followed his mother to the United States where he attended The McCallie School in Chattanooga, Tennessee.

Agnelli enrolled at Brown University in Providence, Rhode Island, as a member of the class of 1986; his thesis was about the Middle East, and he graduated in international relations. In the words of Lee Marshall, Agnelli was often tipped as "Europe's most eligible bachelor" even though in reality he had "little interest in the playboy lifestyle".

== Career ==
In 1982, Agnelli returned to Italy, starting to work in Fiat, more precisely at the Comau of Grugliasco, under the false name of Giovannino Rossi; the pseudonym Giovannino would remain linked to him, especially in Turin, where he was thus identified and recognized by the various namesakes in the family. He was also nicknamed il Delfino of the Agnelli House, a title that refers to the custom of the French kings to nickname the eldest son of the royal family and heir to the throne, the Dauphin of France, precisely to underline the fact that he had been publicly recognized as heir to the company of family by Gianni Agnelli.

After university, Agnelli began his military service as a Carabiniere-paratrooper. On 21 April 1986, he joined the Tuscania battalion of the Carabinieri; he remained in the ranks, unable to take the reserve officer course because the Italian state did not recognize his United States qualification. The same year, he appeared in their advertising campaign aimed at relaunching Tuscania under the name of Carabiniere Giovanni.

Agnelli joined Piaggio in 1987. In 1993, Agnelli became president of the company, which he successfully turned around and built into a European market leader. In the summer of 1995, Gianni Agnelli officially announced his selection as designated future chairman of Fiat. In the role, Agnelli distanced himself from his family and Italy's business establishment, calling for generational change, advocating for more competition from international investment banks in corporate finance, and pushing for increased transparency in Italian capitalism. In an interview with The New York Times, Agnelli stated: "I am not saying the whole system is bad ... because of my education I am more Anglo-Saxon and that means I would like to see the financial markets ruling more and public company models ruled by the forces of the market."

== Business policy ==
Groomed to be the heir of Fiat, he was appointed president of the subsidiary Piaggio on 25 February 1993. On 15 November 1993, he entered the board of directors of Piaggio. In Piaggio, he revived the fortunes of the motorcycle brand. Among other things, he strongly wanted the setting up of a company museum inside the former factories; this wish, named after him, will open its doors four years after his death. The goal was to create a place to celebrate not so much the brand but the work of people and the evolution of the local community around the company to support the idea that people are the beating heart of the growth of every reality. He said: "People are the source of our strength. They are the resource and intelligence of the organization ... Involvement at every level, teamwork, sharing of objectives are necessary for the realization of our mission." Agnelli brought various innovations to Piaggio and concentrated on a new investment policy in the field of new technologies and training. He created the laboratory of the Scuola Sant'Anna and the first approach to business incubation. In the early 1990s, he was active in the production of wine; he was behind the conversion of Syrah to a vine of excellence.

On the occasion of the fiftieth anniversary of the Vespa on 19 September 1996, Agnelli said: "The function of industry is not only or even mainly that of profit. The aim is to improve the quality of life by making products and services available." He was interested in politics and was an interlocutor of many politicians, including one of the founders of Italy's Democratic Party in 2007, Walter Veltroni, thanks to his innovative ideas and his attention to ethics and people's well-being. He is remembered as an enlightened entrepreneur engaged in public life, convinced that doing business meant not only creating income but also improving the life of the community. He often expressed his views on financial matters, such as the gap between the net salary and the gross salary, and the Italian tax law. In his entrepreneurial activity, he was among the first to leave space for the values of the company, to protect them and put them first, which was considered ahead of the times, and projecting the family business towards a socially sustainable development. He was one of the first entrepreneurs to argue that, in order to continue growing, a company must promote the development of the context in which it is inserted, therefore of the territory and the local community, with a series of targeted investments and relationships with the surrounding realities. One of the episodes for which he is remembered is that, as soon as he arrived at Piaggio, Agnelli had drawn up a manifesto of the company's values, in which the first point said: "Our company has social responsibility among its fundamental points of reference. In this context, it considers the problems of safety and environmental impact, of products and production processes, as priorities."

== Personal life and death ==
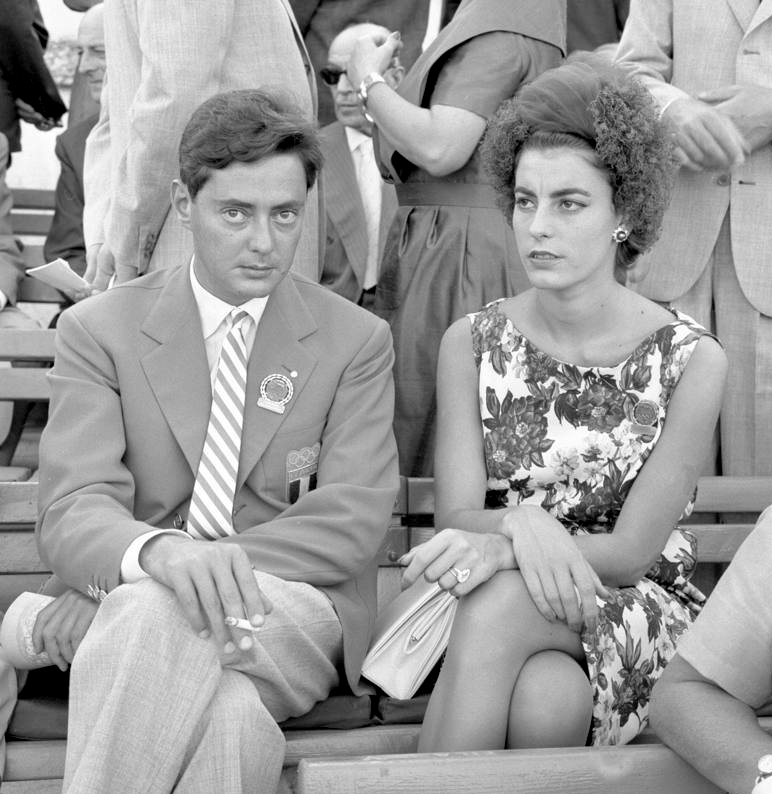
His parents, Umberto Agnelli and Antonella Bechi Piaggio, in 1960

Belonging to one of the most famous families in Italy at the time of his birth as a member of the Agnelli family, his mother was the heiress of motorcycle company Piaggio, which was later acquired by the Agnellis. When his parents divorced in 1974, his mother took the young Agnelli with her to Atlanta, Georgia, US where she owned a dog farm. The parents remarried the same year: his father to Donna Allegra Caracciolo, cousin of Marella Agnelli (born Donna Marella Caracciolo di Castagneto and wife of Gianni Agnelli), and his mother to a duke, Uberto Visconti di Modrone, in turn a relative of Marella Agnelli and Allegra Caracciolo. After both his parents remarried, he had several half-siblings: on his father's side, he had one brother and sister, Andrea Agnelli (born 1975) and Anna Agnelli (born 1977), while on his mother's side he had a sister, Chiara Visconti di Modrone. In 1996, Agnelli married Frances Avery Howe, an Anglo-American architect whom he met when they were both students at Brown University.

Agnelli and his wife had a child, who was born in September 1997. By this time, Agnelli was already experiencing advanced illness from a rare form of stomach cancer. In April 1994, he had called a press conference during which he declared that he had cancer, was undergoing treatment, and that he would be cured by the summer. He was treated in specialized centers in the United States. He died in the villa della Mandria, Turin, on 13 December 1997. About him, Gianni Agnelli said: "It was important for him to be, not to appear." Among others, Juventus FC, the association football club owned by the Agnelli family of which he was a supporter, were mourning; then-Juventus player Filippo Inzaghi cried during the minute of silence before the club's first Serie A match since Agnelli's death. In the words of Alan Friedman, Agnelli's death was a "setback for millions of Italians who saw him as a symbol of generational change, as a spokesman for the need to reform Italy's clubby and oligarchic system of capitalism and as an ardent supporter of political reforms."

== Bibliography ==
- Ferrante, Marco (22 May 2007). Casa Agnelli. Storie e personaggi dell'ultima dinastia italiana [Agnelli House: Stories and Characters of the Last Italian Dynasty] (in Italian) (paperback ed.). Milan: Mondadori. ISBN 978-88-04-56673-1.
