= J-Museum =

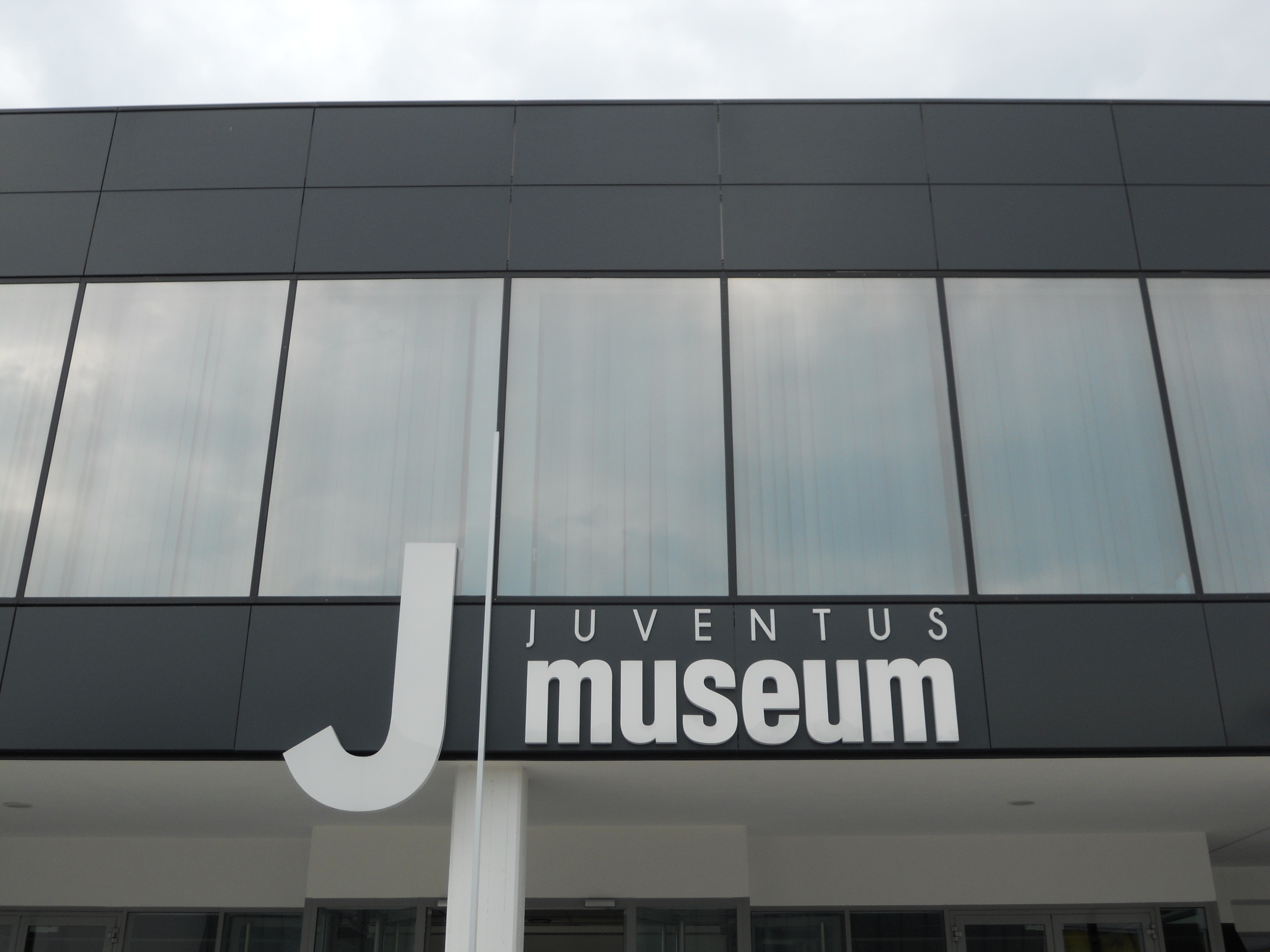
- Entrance to the J-Museum in 2014.
- Established: 2012
- Location: Turin, Italy
- Coordinates: 45°06′35.6″N 07°38′34.5″E
- Type: Sports museum
- Director: Paolo Garimberti
- Owner: Juventus FC
- Website: Official website

The Juventus Museum, called the J-Museum, is a sports museum dedicated to the most decorated football club in Italy, Juventus FC The museum is part of a complex surrounding Juventus Stadium; it is entirely bilingual in Italian and English, and opened in 2012, the 115th anniversary of the club, by club president Andrea Agnelli and museum chairman Paolo Gamberti.

The J-Museum documents the history of Juventus, football in Turin, and the national football team, through the use of modern technologies, a collection of memorabilia, photos, institutional documents and football equipment used by historical club players, as well as the trophies won by Juventus and the women's team.

== History ==
The J-Museum, was unveiled on 16 May 2012, by club president Andrea Agnelli and museum chairman Paolo Gamberti and opened to the public the following day.

The museum has been a popular point of interest with visitors to the Stadium. Just four months after opening to the public, it has recorded some 40,000 visitors. In November 2012, the museum's management announced a partnership with two popular local attractions, the National Museum of Cinema and Reggia di Venaria, to offer a discounted ticket package for visitors.

== Exhibitions and structure ==
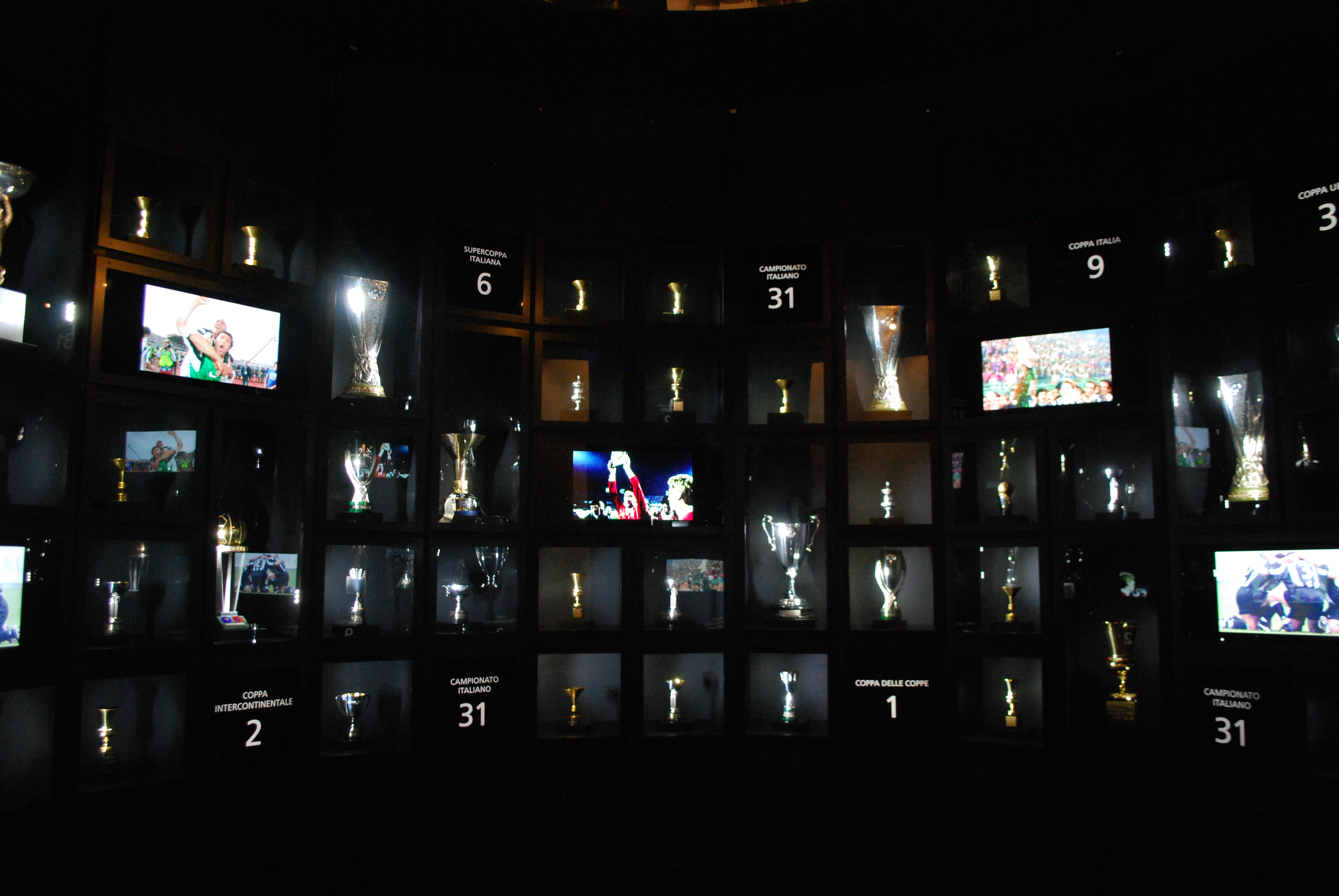
A partial view of the club's trophy room at J-Museum.

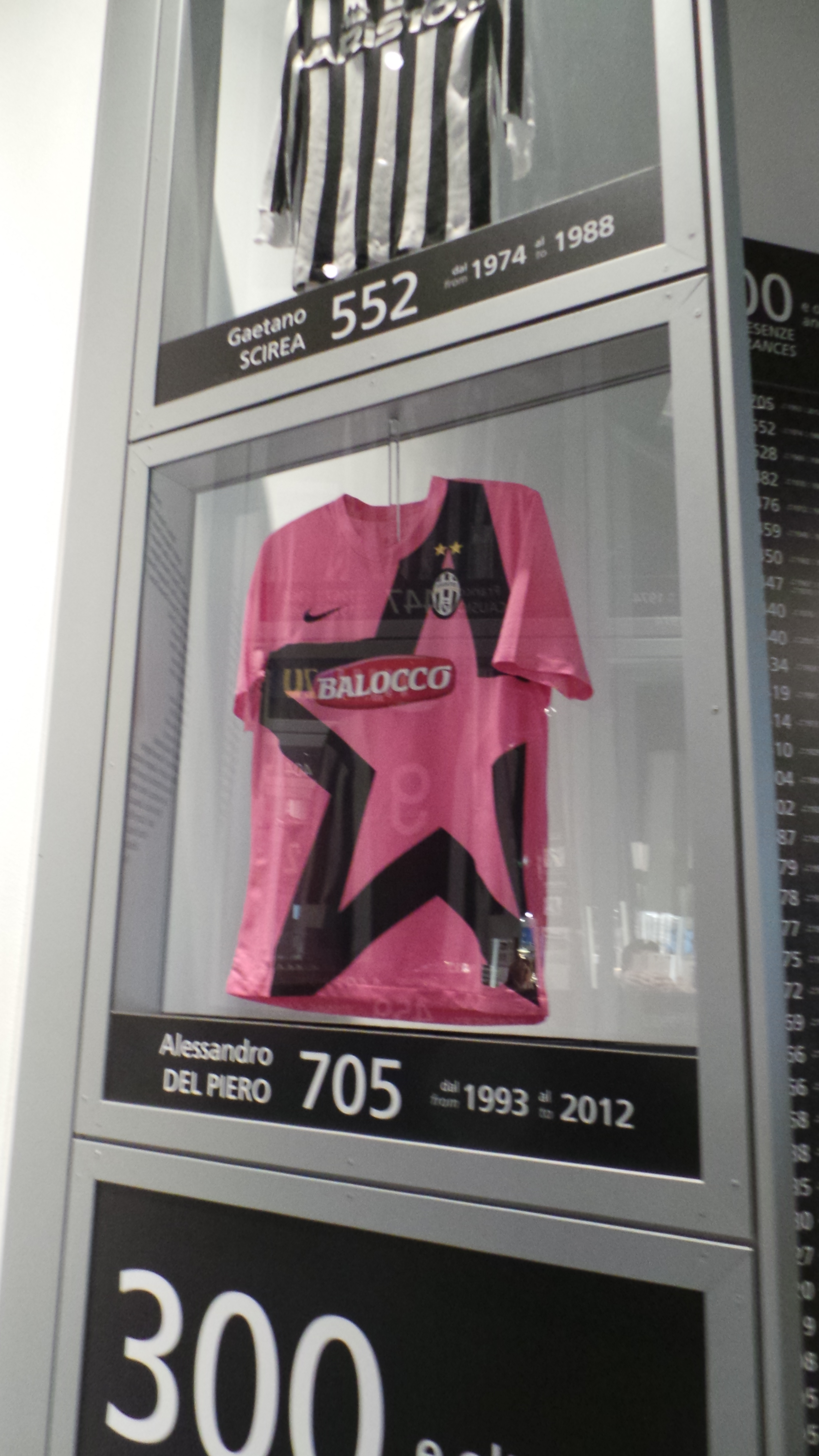
The shirts by Gaetano Scirea and Alessandro Del Piero, part of the collection dedicated to players with over 300 Juventus appearances.

The museum occupies a total area of 2 014 m^{2}. Two rooms include temporary exhibitions and to host educational and cultural activities, with the remaining area dedicated to the exhibition itinerary divided into two areas including the "main path" and "themed settings", including a life-size reproduction of the team's locker room at the Stadium:

The main path, bordered by continuous and sinuous panels that constitute defined paths:

- La Juve segna (Juve score) is the first room that includes the screening and sound representation of Juventus goals.
- Il Tempio dei Trofei (The Trophy Temple) which contains all the competitions and associated trophies Juventus has conquered over the years including the Italian championship, Coppa Italia, Supercoppa Italiana, Intercontinental Cup, European Cup/UEFA Champions League, UEFA Cup Winners' Cup, UEFA Cup, Intertoto Cup, and UEFA Super Cup. They are presented by a game of strobe lights and movies dating back to their respective delivery period.
- La Juve nel Mondo (Juve Worldwide), a map which indicates all of the locations where Juventus has played, and La Juve è forte (Juve's strength), a section with a monitor recounting Juve's strength.
- C'era una volta (Once upon a time), a step back in time that tells the story of Juve's foundation before arriving at the nine chronological walls where the Juventus history is told through memorabilia, photographs, videos and written testimonials.
- The main route ends with current events, La Juve oggi e domani (Juve today and tomorrow), and La Juve siamo noi (We are Juve), a tribute to the millions of fans around the world.

The themed settings is in an open space where the visitor encounters themed devices:

- Memorabilia of all kinds, ranging from the founding Canfari family manuscript, to the players' maglie (jerseys) with more than 300 appearances for Juventus.
- Le due fabbriche (The two enterprises) tells the story of two enterprises that have always represented an essential combination, Fiat and Juventus, while La Juve si racconta (About Juve) includes five devices where Juventus is found in the history of cinema, TV, of radio, literature and music.
- Tavolo multitouch (multitouch table), touchscreen of all the players who have worn the Juventus jersey, as well as a selection of the most beautiful victories; Il Pallone d'Oro (Ballon d'Or), the six Juventus players that this award has been awarded, nine times in total.
- Gli allenatori (The coaches), with the spotlight on Giovanni Trapattoni and Marcello Lippi, the most successful in the history of the club, who speak through a video recounting highlights, curiosities and memories of their experience at the Juventus.
- Fratelli d'Italia (Brothers of Italy), highlighting the contributions of Juventus players to the national team through images, audio and video, including the twenty-two FIFA World Cup winners during their career at the club.
- In Memory - Heysel, a tribute to the victims of the Heysel Stadium disaster, accompanied by the final moment at the museum Fino alla Fine... (Until the End...), a projected short film in 3D at 360 degrees lasting six minutes that presents the way of the players from the locker rooms to the playing field, reproducing the atmosphere within the Stadium.
- The Juventus FC Hall of Fame was launched in September 2025 as a permanent room inside the J-Museum to honour and showcase the accomplishments of individuals who have left a lasting mark on Juventus' history.
