= Edoardo Agnelli =

Son of Italian head of Fiat (1954–2000)

- Agnelli participates in a Jumu'ah of Ayatollah Khamenei on 3 April 1981
- Born: 9 June 1954; New York City, United States
- Died: 15 November 2000 (aged 46); Turin, Italy
- Other name: Hisham Aziz
- Education: Liceo Classico Massimo d'Azeglio; Atlantic College; Princeton University
- Occupation: Businessman
- Parents: Gianni Agnelli (father); Marella Agnelli (mother)
- Family: Agnelli family House of Caracciolo

Edoardo Agnelli (9 June 1954 – 15 November 2000), also known as Mahdi Agnelli, was an Italian businessman and the only son of Gianni Agnelli, the industrialist patriarch of Fiat S.p.A., and of Marella Agnelli, who was born Donna Marella Caracciolo di Castagneto. He converted to Islam when he was living in New York City, and changed his name to Mahdi Agnelli. In mid-November 2000, he was found dead under a bridge on the outskirts of Turin.

== Biography ==
Agnelli was born in New York City to Italian parents Marella and Gianni Agnelli, who had married in 1953; his maternal grandmother was American and had one sister, Margherita. He had studied at the Liceo Classico Massimo d'Azeglio in Turin, at Atlantic College in the Vale of Glamorgan in south Wales, and he read modern literature in Latin and Eastern philosophy at Princeton University.

After leaving Princeton, Agnelli traveled to Kenya, Iran, and India, where he met Sathya Sai Baba and pursued his interest in Eastern religions and mysticism. He was known by his friends in New York as "Crazy Eddy" due to his restless adolescence and wild behavior. For his anti-capitalist and religious views, including criticism of capitalism in an interview following the Peace March of Assisi, he was seen as a rebel and a heretic. According to La Repubblica, Agnelli's preoccupations became increasingly erratic, lecturing about mysticism, Franciscanism, and Buddhism, praising of the poor, and criticizing the behavior of the family business, Fiat. According to The Guardian, his views opposed to economic materialism made him move in a different direction than his parents.

As an adult, Agnelli was being groomed to be the heir apparent to the Fiat empire. In the night of 27 October 1986, he made public his disagreement with his father and proclaimed himself ready to take "all the responsibilities that belong to the ownership of a large group like ours"; his father, who had already been unhappy with his conversion to Islam, ensured that he would not inherit it. The only official position that the younger Agnelli held in the family businesses was as a director of Juventus FC. In doing so, he continued the tradition of the Fiat-owner family dating back to the 1920s. In this capacity, he was present at the Heysel disaster. In 1990, he was accused for heroin possession in Malindi; the charges were later dropped. (Note: Agnelli was charged based on the law n. 685 of 1975 concerning the "modest quantity for personal use". His position as a suspect arose from an investigation into the Roma Bene drug ring following a death by heroin overdose, which took place on 6 June 1988, of Ranieri Ferrara Santamaria, son of a well-known lawyer and a friend of Agnelli. Following the testimony provided by these who admitted their drug addiction, the investigating judge Stefano Meschini, and the findings of the telephone interceptions of some conversations between the defendant and the victim, thirty people were sent to trial; among the latter were the names of some drug dealers, as well as various members of the entertainment world and Roman high society. Agnelli was acquitted.)

=== Conversion to Islam ===
Agnelli converted to Sunni Islam in an Islamic centre in New York where he was named Hisham Aziz. He then met Ali Khamenei in Tehran and was reported to have converted to Shia Islam. According to Mohammad Hassan Ghadiri Abyaneh, Agnelli recited his shahada in front of Fakhreddin Hejazi, became a Shia Muslim, and changed his name to Mahdi. He said: "One day, while I was in New York, I was walking in a library and a Quran caught my glimpse. I was curious about what was in it. I started reading it in English and I felt that those words were holy words and cannot be the words of men. I was really touched and borrowed the book and studied it further and I felt like I was understanding it and I believed it."

== Death ==
On 15 November 2000, 46-year-old Agnelli's body was found near Turin, on a river bed beneath a motorway viaduct on which his car was found. The viaduct is known as the bridge of suicides. According to a report by Marco Ellena, the doctor from the public health office of nearby city Cuneo, who examined Agnelli's body, said: "He died because of deadly wounds after having fallen 80 meters." The report also stated that he was alive when his body impacted with the ground. His head, face, and chest were damaged due to the fall and an autopsy detected some internal injuries, which seemed to prove the suicide theory. Nothing was unusual in his death scene and police did not find anything in his car apart from phones, cigarettes, a walking stick, an address book, and a bottle of water. His conversion to Islam and the fast process of his funeral thereafter started some rumors about his suicide. Riccardo Bausone, the public prosecutor who was working on the case, closed the investigation and concluded that Agnelli's death was a suicide. His father joined police at the scene; he was reported to not have cried once he learned about Agnelli's death, but was devastated.

Giuseppe Puppo, an Italian journalist and writer, published a book about Agnelli's death in 2009, using interviews and unpublished testimonies. Puppo regards some of the points as inconsistencies and oddities — the absence of the bodyguards of Edoardo Agnelli; the interval of two hours between leaving home and arriving on the Fossano viaduct; the cameras of Agnelli, whose images have never been released; the telephone traffic on the two phones; the total absence of witnesses along a road section that recorded at least eight cars per minute at that time; the lack of fingerprints on the car; and the hurried burial without a proper autopsy. He was buried next to his cousin, Giovanni Alberto Agnelli, in his family vault in the cemetery perched above the grounds of the Agnelli family villa at Villar Perosa. Giorgio Agnelli, the second son of Virginia Agnelli (born Donna Virginia Bourbon del Monte) and the elder Edoardo Agnelli, did not participate in the family business due to a serious illness and died by suicide at the age of 36 in 1965. Both Edoardo and Giorgio Agnelli were described as caring about their family and suffered from being marginalized.

== Bibliography ==
- Bernardini, Marco (1 January 2004). Edoardo. Senza corona... senza scorta [Edoardo: Without crown... Without escort] (in Italian) (paperback ed.). Turin: Edizioni Spoon River. ISBN 978-8-8869-0679-1.
- Parisi, Antonio (3 November 2011). I misteri di casa Agnelli [The Mysteries of the Agnelli House] (in Italian) (paperback ed.). Rome: Aliberti Editore. ISBN 978-8-8742-4697-7.
- Puppo, Giuseppe (January 2009). Ottanta metri di mistero. La tragica morte di Edoardo Agnelli [Eighty Meters of Mystery: The Tragic Death of Edoardo Agnelli] (in Italian) (paperback ed.). Rome: Koinè Edizioni. ISBN 978-88-87509-93-9.
- Puppo, Giuseppe (1 January 2015). Un giallo troppo complicato. Gli sviluppi del caso e nuove rivelazioni sulla tragica morte di Edoardo Agnelli [A Too Complicated Yellow: The Developments of the Case and New Revelations on the Tragic Death of Edoardo Agnelli] (in Italian) (paperback ed.). Chieti: Edizioni Tabula Fati. ISBN 978-8-8747-5422-9.
- Scherman, Magnus E. (April 2011). L'agnello nero [The Black Lamb] (in Italian) (paperback ed.). London: Edizioni Forlag1.dk. ISBN 978-8-8938-8406-8.
