= Edoardo Agnelli (entrepreneur, born 1892) =

Italian entrepreneur (1892–1935)

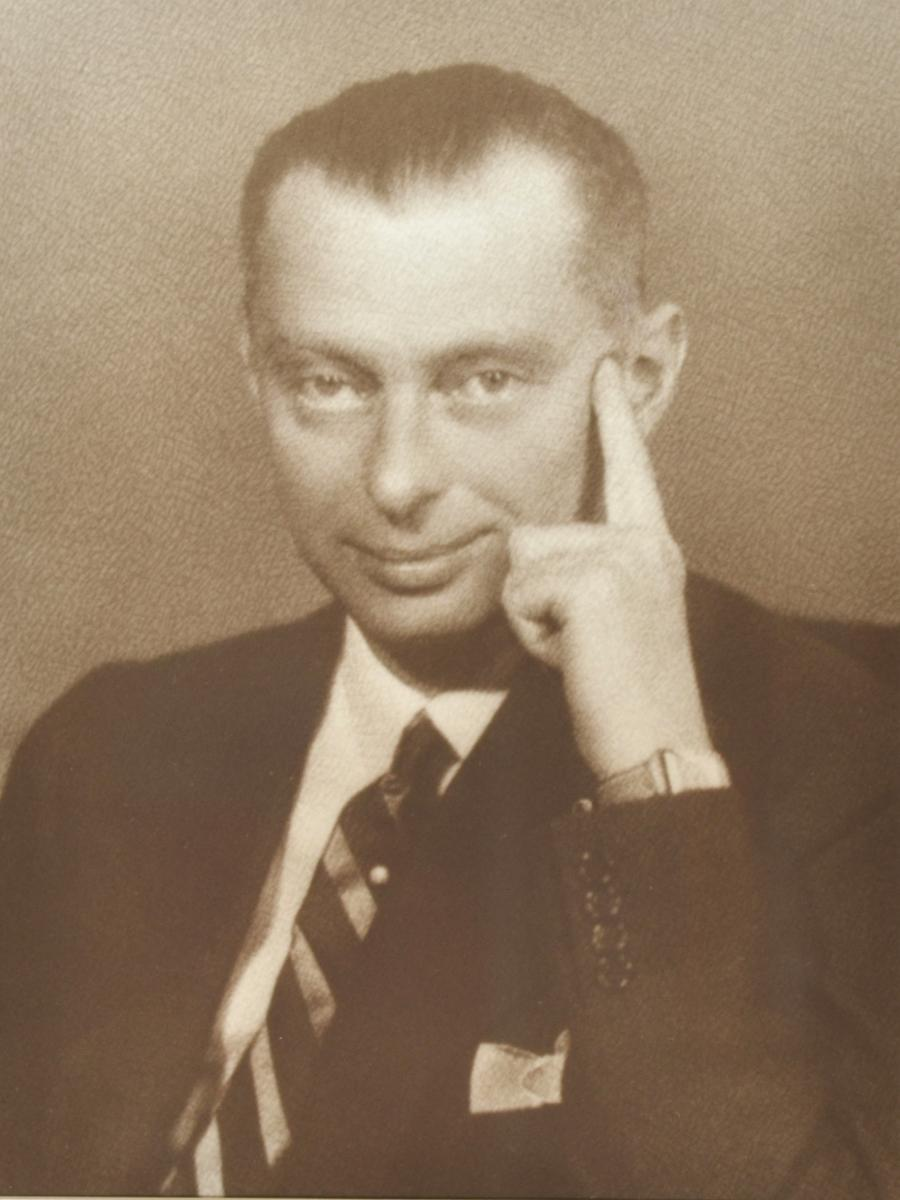
- Agnelli in the 1930s
- Born: 2 January 1892; Verona, Italy
- Died: 14 July 1935 (aged 43); Genoa, Italy
- Occupation: Businessman
- Spouse: Virginia Bourbon del Monte
- Children: 7
- Parent(s): Giovanni Agnelli; Clara Boselli
- Family: Agnelli family

Edoardo Agnelli (2 January 1892 – 14 July 1935) was an Italian entrepreneur and industrialist. He was the principal family shareholder of the Italian car company Fiat S.p.A., as well as chairman of Juventus from 1923 until his death in 1935.

== Early life ==
Born in Verona, he was the only son of Giovanni Agnelli (1866–1945), principal founder of Fiat, and Clara Boselli (1869–1946). He married Donna Virginia Bourbon del Monte (1899–1945), daughter of Carlo Bourbon del Monte, Prince of San Faustino, and his Kentucky-born wife Jane Allen Campbell.

== Family ==
Agnelli and his wife had seven children:

- Clara (1920–2016), wife of Prince Tassilo zu Fürstenberg, mother of Prince Egon von Fürstenberg and Princess Ira von Fürstenberg
- Gianni (1921–2003)
- Susanna (1922–2009), wife of Count Urbano Rattazzi
- Maria Sole (1925–2025)
- Cristiana (1927–2026), wife of Count Brandolino Brandolini d'Adda
- Giorgio (1929–1965)
- Umberto (1934–2004)

Agnelli's eldest son, Gianni, served as the head of Fiat from 1966 to 2003. He transformed the company into the most important in Italy and one of the major car builders in Europe. Agnelli's daughter Susanna was the first woman to become Italian Minister of Foreign Affairs. In the 21st century, his grandson Andrea Agnelli became chairman of Juventus.

== Sports ==
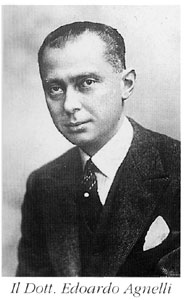
Agnelli in the early 1900s

Agnelli was elected by the then assemblea di soci (membership assembly) as president of Italian association football club Juventus on 24 July 1923. This was a turning point, as it coincided with the switch from amateur to professional football, which became, in the words of historian Aldo Agosti, "an indicator of the deepest transformations that take place in society, imposed from above by a mass system that the fascist regime tries to create." According to Agosti, "Juve, never truly aligned with the regime, at the time perhaps embodied a certain reactionary respectability, but showed intolerance of the showy, even vulgar displays of fascism, intercepted the change and laid the foundations for a solid club, up to today's Juve", which faced the European football changes. Upon being elected, Agnelli said: "I am grateful to you for welcoming my presidency as an honour, but I hope I will not disappoint you if I confess that I have no intention of considering it merely honorary. We must commit ourselves to doing well, but remembering that something done well can always be done better."

Agnelli became one of the most important directors in Juventus history, as well as of Italian football, and the one to whom credit can be given for transforming it from a club with local status to a national institution, as well as having started a series of sporting successes that turned it into Italy's most winning club in the 1950s during the administration of Umberto Agnelli, his son. Under his management, which lasted until Agnelli's death in 1935, the Turinese club established itself as a major force at the national stage having won six Italian league championships of the only top-flight competition in the country, including five in a row, being the first team to do so, a national record for the next 82 years before being broken by Andrea Agnelli's Juventus. It was also among the best continental sides during the interwar period reaching four consecutive Mitropa Cup semi-finals. His presidency is renowned as the beginning of the almost uninterrupted synergy between the football club and the Agnelli family, the oldest and longest-lasting in Italian sports, (Note: During the Italian resistance against Nazism and Italian fascism (1943–1945), Juventus was at the time a sports club and multisports association, which was controlled by Turinese industrialist and former Juventus player Piero Dusio through car house Cisitalia. Various members of the Agnelli family have held various positions at the executive level in the club since 1939.) making Juventus one of the first professional sporting clubs ante litteram in the country.

== Death ==
Agnelli died in a plane accident on 14 July 1935, when he was returning to Genoa from Forte dei Marmi in his father's seaplane, a Savoia-Marchetti SM.80 piloted by Arturo Ferrarin. The seaplane's floats bumped into a wandering tree trunk, causing the plane to overturn. Agnelli died after being struck on the back of the head by the propeller, which decapitated him; Ferrarin was uninjured.

== See also ==
- List of Juventus F.C. chairmen
- Professionalism in association football

== Bibliography ==
- Clark, Jennifer (2024). L'ultima dinastia. La saga della famiglia Agnelli da Giovanni a John (in Italian). Milan: Solferino. ISBN 978-88-282-1455-7.
- Gould, David; Hazard, Patrick (2001). Fear and Loathing in World Football. Oxford: Berg Publishers. ISBN 1-85973-463-4.
- Tranfaglia, Nicola; Zunino, Pier Giorgio (1998). Guida all'Italia contemporanea, 1861–1997 (in Italian). Vol. 4. Milan: Garzanti. ISBN 88-11-34204-X.
