= Jane Allen Campbell =

American socialite and Italian princess

- Princess of San Faustino; Marchesa of Santa Maria
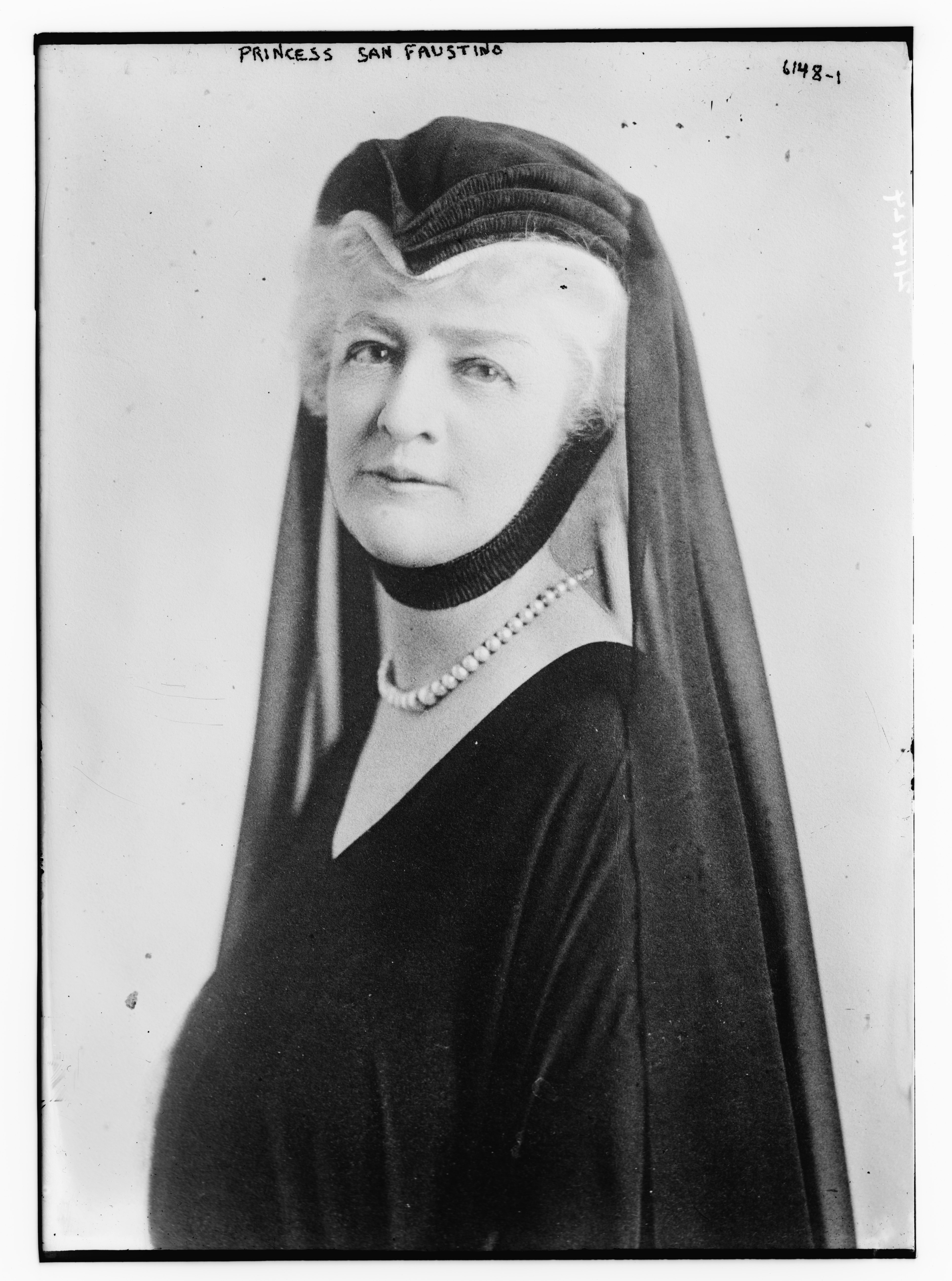
- Jane wearing mourning dress in 1900
- Born: 1865; Montclair, New Jersey, U.S.
- Died: June 24, 1938 (aged 72–73); Rome, Italy
- Noble family: Bourbon del Monte
- Spouses: Carlo Bourbon del Monte, Prince of San Faustino and Marquis of Santa Maria (m. 1897)
- Issue: Ranieri Bourbon del Monte, Prince of San Faustino; Virginia Bourbon del Monte
- Father: George W. Campbell
- Mother: Virginia Watson

Jane Bourbon del Monte, Princess of San Faustino, Marchesa of Santa Maria (1865 – June 24, 1938) was an American socialite and memoirist who married into the Italian and Papal nobility. She was awarded the Red Cross Gold Medal in 1929 for her charitable work for a colony of children infected with tuberculosis. In her later life, she published her memoirs in an Italian weekly paper.

== Biography ==
Campbell was born in 1865 in Montclair, New Jersey, to George W. Campbell, a wealthy linseed oil trader, and Virginia Watson. Following the death of her father, she and her mother moved to Rome.

She married Carlo Bourbon del Monte, Prince of San Faustino and Marquis of Santa Maria on June 7, 1897. Her husband descended from an old Italian family that was ennobled by Pope Pius IX in 1861. She gave birth to two children, Ranieri Bourbon del Monte, Prince of San Faustino and Donna Virginia Bourbon del Monte.

Campbell was known for her modern ideas and disregard for many of the strict social conventions of the Roman aristocracy, which caused scandal in Roman high society. Soon after her debut in Roman society, she and her husband hosted a reception where only lemonade, not alcohol, was being served. She preferred to serve champagne at social functions and, after her husband refused to give her the key to their wine cellar, she pawned one of her heirloom gold necklaces to pay for champagne for the guests.

In 1929, she received the Red Cross Gold Medal for her charitable work for a colony of children infected with tuberculosis in Testaccio. She volunteered there alongside her daughter, Virginia, and Edda Mussolini, Filippo Cremonesi, and Edoardo Agnelli.

Following the death of her husband, she remained in deep mourning dress for the remainder of her life. Towards the end of her life, Campbell published her memoirs in an Italian weekly newspaper, complete with names of friends and acquaintances and detailed accounts of her experiences as part of the Italian aristocracy.

She died of pneumonia on June 24, 1938.
