= Umberto Agnelli =

Italian industrialist and politician (1934–2004)

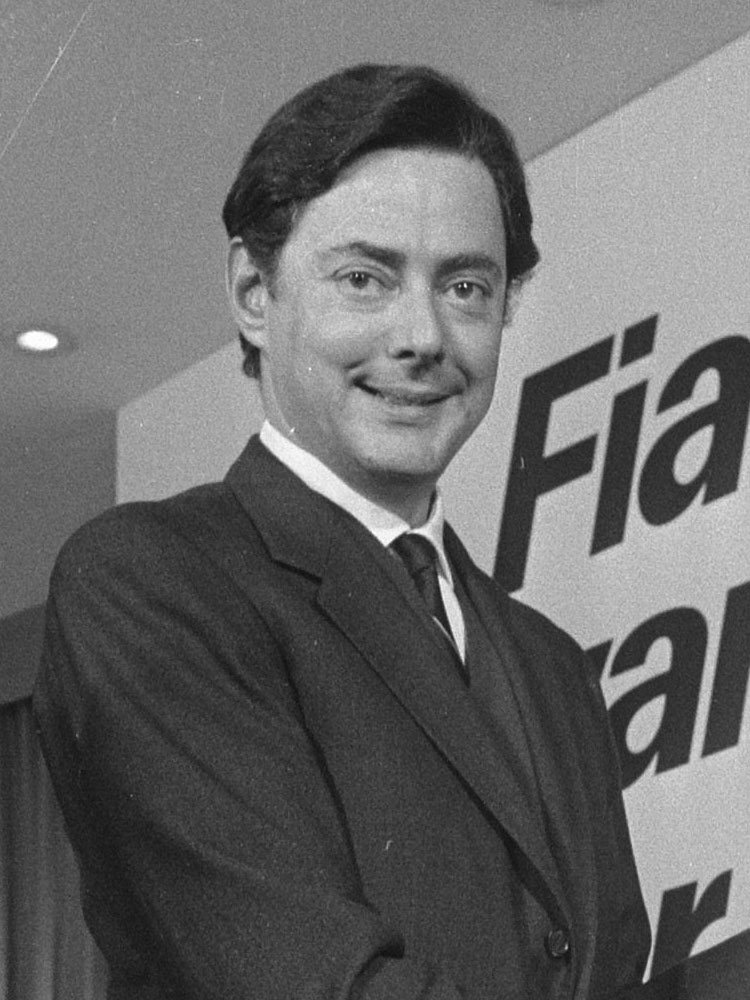
- Agnelli in 1970

Member of the Senate of the Republic
- In office 5 July 1976 – 19 June 1979
- Constituency: Rome

President of FIGC
- In office 10 August 1959 – 7 August 1961
- Preceded by: Bruno Zauli
- Succeeded by: Giuseppe Pasquale

Personal details
- Born: 1 November 1934 Lausanne, Vaud, Switzerland
- Died: 27 May 2004 (aged 69) Venaria Reale, Italy
- Party: Christian Democracy
- Spouses: Antonella Bechi Piaggio (m. 1959; div. 1974); Allegra Caracciolo di Castagneto (m. 1975)
- Children: 5, including Giovanni Alberto and Andrea
- Parents: Edoardo Agnelli; Virginia Bourbon del Monte
- Relatives: Agnelli family
- Education: University of Catania
- Occupation: Head of Fiat S.p.A. and Juventus

Umberto Agnelli (Italian: [umˈbɛrto aɲˈɲɛlli]; 1 November 1934 – 27 May 2004) was an Italian industrialist and politician. He was the third son of Virginia (born Donna Virginia Bourbon del Monte) and Edoardo Agnelli, and the youngest brother of Gianni Agnelli.

Agnelli served as a CEO of Italian carmaker Fiat from 1970 to 1976. After the death of his brother, he was briefly chairman of the Fiat Group until his death, aged 69, in 2004. He was also chairman and later honorary chairman of Juventus, the football team long-associated with Fiat and the Agnelli family, and was for a time the president of the Italian Football Federation. He was a Christian Democracy member of the Senate of the Republic from 1976 to 1979. In 2015, he was posthumously inducted into the Italian Football Hall of Fame.

== Early life ==
Agnelli was born in Lausanne, Switzerland, on 1 November 1934, as the youngest of seven children. After the premature deaths of his parents, Edoardo Agnelli and Virginia Bourbon del Monte in two unrelated accidents, he was raised by his older brother Gianni Agnelli. He graduated in law at the University of Catania. Like his brother and his grandfather, Giovanni Agnelli, who cofounded Fiat S.p.A. in 1899, he also carried out his military service at the Pinerolo Cavalry Application School.

== Career ==
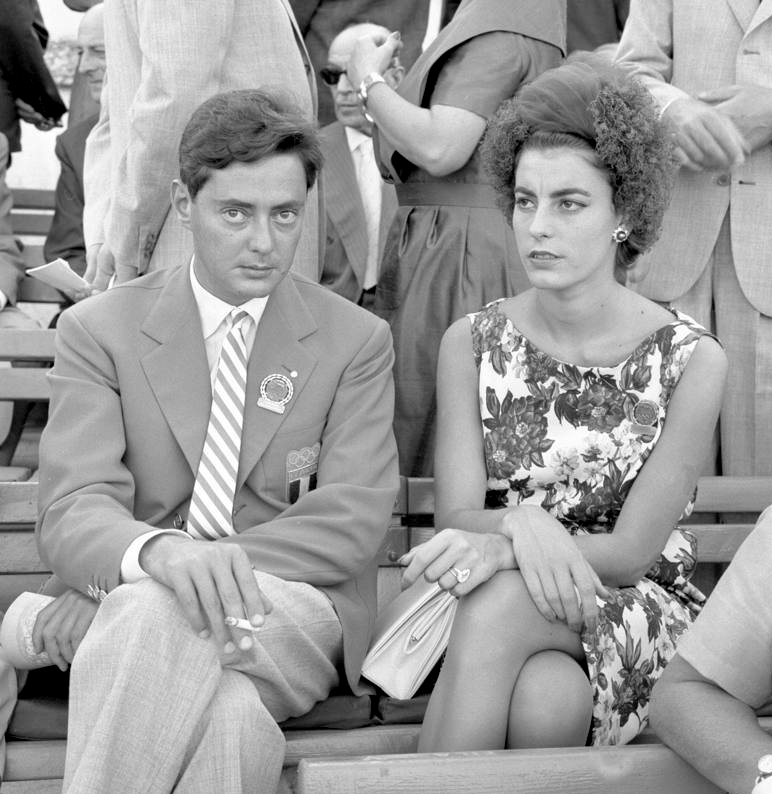
Agnelli with his first wife at the 1960 Summer Olympics in Rome

Agnelli was chairman of Fiat France from 1965 to 1980, chief executive officer of Fiat from 1970 to 1976 and its vice president from 1976 to 1993. He was chairman of Fiat Auto from 1980 to 1990, and was a member of the International Advisory Board from 1993 to 2004. He was also chairman of Juventus between 1956 and 1961 and was honorary chairman from 1970 to 2004. He led the club to become the most successful in Italian football.

Engaged for a long time in the Fiat restructuring process, with the simultaneous opening towards foreign capital and markets, Agnelli and his family were listed 278th in the 2003 Forbes ranking of the richest people in the world, with an estimated net worth of around US$1.5 billion. Although he was a senior executive at Fiat, Agnelli was sidelined from taking a leadership role by his older brother, whom he had supported for a long time in the management of the family company even if often forced to remain on the bench for financial power games, until the latter's death in 2003.

From 2003 to 2004, Agnelli took over as chairman of the Fiat Group. Compared to the past, he decided to change his strategy by concentrating all Fiat resources on the car and turning to an external manager, Giuseppe Morchio, to whom he would entrust the leadership of the company. The Agnelli family's management was described as progressive and paternalistic.

Starting in the 1980s and accelerating into the 1990s, when the company was struggling, Agnelli was the architect of Fiat's diversification. The Fiat Group controlled several Italian newspapers and publishers in addition to the Fiat car firms and Juventus. Agnelli was in the process of restoring Fiat's fortunes, following a period in which the company's balance sheet, market share, and share value had all been in decline in the company's worst financial crisis, when he suddenly died of lung cancer after 18 months in control. Despite this, Forbes estimated that he was the world's 68th richest man with an approximate net worth of US$5.5 billion. He was a member of the Steering Committee of the Bilderberg Group.

== Juventus ==
Elected in 1955 by a council of members, including his older brother, who was president of the club, he became the youngest person to assume the highest managerial position in the history of Juventus. His management was characterized by the signings of important players, such as John Charles and Omar Sívori, who proved to be decisive for the conquest of three Serie A championships and two consecutive Coppa Italias from 1958 to 1961. Before he died, Agnelli was instrumental in signing Fabio Capello as Juventus coach in 2004. He also had transformed the club into a modern publicly listed company with important investment projects. After leaving the presidential role in 1962, Agnelli remained tied to Juventus. In 1994, he took over the management activities previously carried out by his brother, exerting greater influence on the club as honorary president during the following decade, a period in which the club won another five Serie A titles, one more Coppa Italia, four Supercoppa Italianas, one Intercontinental Cup, one UEFA Champions League, one UEFA Intertoto Cup and one UEFA Super Cup, for a total of 19 trophies in 18 years. By virtue of the sporting successes achieved during his managerial sporting career, Agnelli was jointly inducted by the Italian Football Federation (FIGC) and the Coverciano Football Museum Foundation into the Italian Football Hall of Fame in 2015.

In 1999, Juventus improved their own record of having won all five major UEFA competitions by winning the Intertoto Cup, the next year was voted the seventh best of the FIFA Club of the Century and in 2009 was placed by the International Federation of Football History & Statistics second in the European best club of the 20th-century ranking, the highest for an Italian club in both; by the early 2000s, the club had the third best revenue in Europe at over €200 million. This all changed when, three years after his death, Calciopoli controversially hit the club, which was demoted to Serie B for the first time in its history, despite the club being acquitted and the leagues were ruled to be regular; it was his son, Andrea Agnelli, who built the club back up in the 2010s. When Agnelli died in 2004, Juventus had won the 2001–02 Serie A, the club's 26th scudetto, at the last matchday, and had reached the 2003 UEFA Champions League final, the club's four UEFA Champions League final in seven years, three of which were achieved consecutively; those in 1997, against Borussia Dortmund, and in 1998, against Real Madrid, were lost out controversially. In the words of Fulvio Bianchi, early 2000s Juventus were "stronger than all those that came after, and had €250 million in revenue, being at the top of Europe, and 100 sponsors. It took ten years to recover and return to the top Italians, not yet Europeans: now the club makes over €300 million, but in the meantime Real, Bayern, and the others have taken off."

Some observers allege that Calciopoli and its aftermath were a dispute within Juventus and between the club's owners that came after the deaths of Umberto and Gianni Agnelli, including Franzo Grande Stevens and Gianluigi Gabetti who favoured Agnelli's grandson, John Elkann, over his nephew as chairman, and wanted to get rid of Luciano Moggi, Antonio Giraudo, and Roberto Bettega, whose shares in the club increased. Whatever their intentions, it is argued they condemned Juventus: first when Carlo Zaccone, the club's lawyer, agreed for relegation to Serie B and point-deduction, when he made that statement because Juventus were the only club risking more than one-division relegation (Serie C), and he meant for Juventus (the sole club to be ultimately demoted) to have equal treatment with the other clubs; and then when Luca Cordero di Montezemolo retired the club's appeal to the Regional Administrative Court of Lazio, which could have cleared the club's name and avoid relegation, after FIFA threatened to suspend the FIGC from international play, a renounce for which then-FIFA president Sepp Blatter was thankful.

Several observers, including former FIGC president Franco Carraro, argue that had Agnelli been alive, things would have done different, as the club and its directors would have been defended properly, which could have avoided relegation and cleared the club's name much earlier than the Calciopoli trials of the 2010s. It is argued that Agnelli would have taken the same position as his son, but much harder. Moggi, one of the two Juventus directors involved in the scandal, said that Calciopoli only happened because "l'Avvocato Agnelli and il Dottor Umberto died", and had the two Agnellis not died, "nothing [of this farce] would have happened." According to observers, Juventus was weak after the deaths of the Agnelli, with Moggi saying this "made us orphans and weak, it was easy to attack Juve and destroy them by making things up." According to critics, Juventus bothered because they won too much under Agnelli. Then-CONI president Gianni Petrucci said "a team that wins too much is harmful to their sport."

== Politics ==
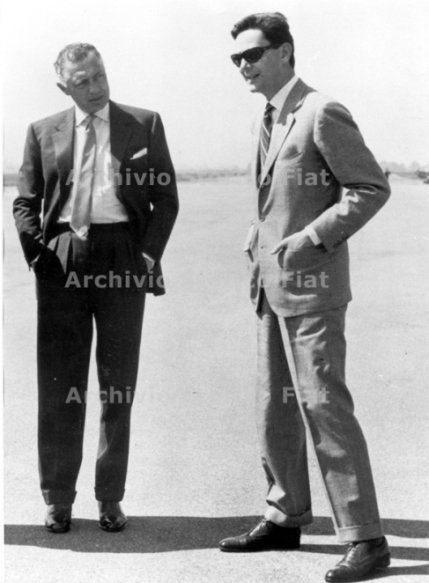
Agnelli (right) with his older brother, Gianni Agnelli, in 1965

Politically, the Agnelli family sought to create a non-ideological, centrist political formation of Atlanticist and pro-European persuasion that sought a modernising, internationalist capitalism in contrast to the left and opposed to the populist, nationalist, or fascist right. In the 1970s, Agnelli was elected a member of the Senate of the Republic for Christian Democracy (DC). This came after the DC won over a struggle in which Gianni Agnelli would be present in the Italian Republican Party list for the 1976 Italian general election, a move that could have cost them about one million votes. In turn, the DC obtained the candidacy of Agnelli as a senator, a position he held until 1979. He took his role seriously, and he held a conference of DC senators in Rome to discuss the renewal of the party; in response, he was admonished.

== Personal life and death ==
Agnelli's life was beset by an unusual amount of tragedy and bereavement. His father, Edoardo Agnelli, perished in an air crash when he was one year old; his mother, Virginia Bourbon del Monte, died in a car accident in 1945 when he was 11 years old. His nephew, Edoardo Agnelli, committed suicide in 2000.

In 1959, Agnelli married a cousin of his sister-in-law Marella Agnelli, the heiress Donna Antonella Bechi Piaggio, from the well-known business family of Piaggio that created Vespa, who later married a distant maternal relative of Allegra Caracciolo, Uberto Visconti di Modrone. Agnelli and Bechi Piaggio had three sons but their first, twin boys, died shortly after birth. The third son was Giovanni Alberto Agnelli, who grew up to be the head of the maternal family-firm Piaggio, and was being groomed to succeed at Fiat but died of cancer at the age of 33 in 1997. After he divorced from his wife, Agnelli married Donna Allegra Caracciolo di Castagneto in 1974. She is the first cousin of Agnelli's sister-in-law Marella Caracciolo di Castagneto, also the wife of Agnelli's brother. The ladies come from a noble family dating back to the Kingdom of Naples that has, among others, the titles of nobility of Prince of Castagneto and Duke of Melito. From his second marriage came two children, who were named Andrea (born 1975) and Anna (born 1977). His son, Andrea Agnelli, later followed in his footsteps by becoming chairman of Juventus in 2010.

Suffering from lung cancer, which became public only a month before his death after a Financial Times report, Agnelli spent his last days assisted by his wife and two children at their residence in La Mandria, which included La Mandria Regional Park, in the Venaria Reale area, where he died on 27 May 2004, fifteen days before the death of his nephew, Prince Egon von Fürstenberg. His last public appearance had taken place on 26 April, when his wife was awarded an honorary degree in veterinary medicine by the University of Turin. Agnelli's worsening health conditions prevented him from attending the Fiat shareholders' meeting on 11 May.

== Honours ==
- Knight Grand Cross of the Legion of Honour, 27 December 1967.
- Officer Grand Cross of the Legion of Honour, 1969.
- Knight Grand Cross of the Order of Merit of the Italian Republic, 2 June 1972.
- Knight Grand Cross of the Order of the Sacred Treasure, 1996.
