= Virginia Bourbon del Monte =

Italian noble (1899–1945)

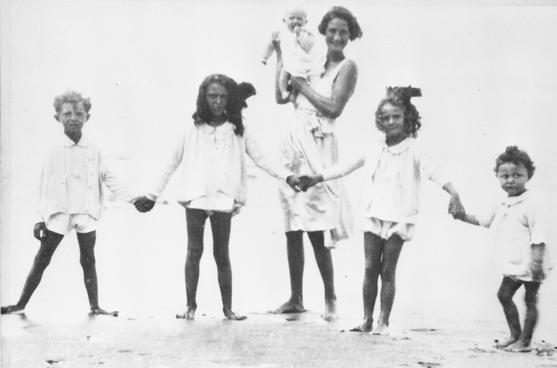
- Born: Virginia Bourbon del Monte dei principi di San Faustino; 24 May 1899; Rome, Italy
- Died: 30 November 1945 (aged 46); Pisa, Italy
- Noble family: Bourbon del Monte
- Spouse: Edoardo Agnelli (m. 1919; died 1935)
- Issue: Princess Clara von Fürstenberg (1920–2016); Gianni Agnelli (1921–2003); Susanna, Contessa Rattazzi (1922–2009); Maria Sole (1925–2025); Cristiana, Contessa Brandolini d'Adda (1927-2026); Giorgio Agnelli (1929–1965); Umberto Agnelli (1934–2004)
- Father: Carlo Bourbon del Monte, Prince di San Faustino
- Mother: Jane Allen Campbell

Donna Virginia Bourbon del Monte dei principi di San Faustino (24 May 1899 – 30 November 1945) was the wife of Edoardo Agnelli and the mother of Gianni Agnelli.

== Biography ==
Born in Rome, she was the daughter of Carlo Bourbon del Monte, Prince di San Faustino (1867–1917), a descendant of an ancient Tuscan-Umbrian family, with a noble title awarded by Pope Pius IX in 1861. Her brother Ranieri Bourbon del Monte Santa Maria, Prince of San Faustino, was the first husband of painter Kay Sage. Her mother was the American heiress Jane Allen Campbell (1865–1938); originally from New Jersey, she was the daughter of a wealthy American linseed oil trader, the son of Ludlow D. Campbell, George W. Campbell, and his second wife, Virginia Watson. After Campbell's death, which took place in the first half of the 1890s, the widow moved with her daughter to Rome, where the young Campbell met and married Carlo Bourbon del Monte in 1897.

On 5 June 1919, she married Edoardo Agnelli, the son of senator and Fiat co-founder Giovanni Agnelli. She became a widow on 14 July 1935, as her husband died in a plane crash in the seadrome of Genoa.

A few months after the death of her husband, she engaged in an intimate relationship with the journalist and writer Curzio Malaparte. Their wedding ceremony, which was originally scheduled for October 1936, did not take place due to the opposition of her father-in-law. Moreover, Curzio had become unpopular among the highest authorities of Benito Mussolini's Italian fascist regime. As a consequence, Curzio had been expelled from the National Fascist Party (PNF) and forced into exile on the island of Lipari for a certain period of time in 1933. Meanwhile, she had to face a tough confrontation with her father-in-law, who tried to claim parental authority over her seven children by all means after finding out that the two lovers were about to get married. In deliberating on this issue, the Court of Turin pronounced a verdict against the mother. The dispute went on with several legal actions until she decided to move to Rome. Since there were better chances for her of being favoured by the judicial authorities of Rome, her father-in-law finally gave his consent to negotiate a compromise agreement by the end of 1937. Its most important aspect was the granting of child custody to Virginia; this settlement was the one supported by her children themselves.

She was arrested in Rome on 8 September 1943, since she was the daughter of a U.S. citizen, a country at that time at war against Nazi Germany, and confined in a villa on the Caelian Hill, from which she was then able to escape. After coming back to Rome as a free person, in collaboration with Colonel Eugen Dollmann, she arranged a meeting in Vatican City between Pope Pius XII and General Karl Wolff. The latter was the Military Governor and the Supreme Commander of the SS and of the police in Northern Italy. The meeting was intended to avoid bloodshed during the imminent German retreat from Rome. It was successful, and led to the release from prison of Giuliano Vassalli, a jurist and member of the Italian Resistance, who had been held in detention by the SS in their headquarters in the German Embassy on 145 via Tasso.

She died in a car accident near Pisa in the late afternoon of 30 November 1945, fifteen days before the death of her father-in-law, after the car in which she was traveling on its way from Rome to Forte dei Marmi was hit head-on by a U.S. Army truck. She died instantly. The fatal crash occurred on the via Aurelia in proximity to the pine forest of San Rossore.
