= Gianluca Ferrero =

Italian businessman (born 1963)

Gianluca Ferrero (born 1963) is an Italian businessman who has been serving as the president of Juventus since 18 January 2023.

== Biography ==
Born in Turin in 1963, Ferrero graduated in Business Economics in 1988 at the University of Turin with the highest mark. In 1989, he registered with the Order of Chartered accountants and in 1995 he registered with the Order of Statutory auditors. In November 2022, Exor, which is the largest shareholder of Juventus, appointed Ferrero as chairman of the bianconeri from 18 January 2023.
