= Giorgio Agnelli =

Member of the Agnelli family (1929–1965)

- Born: 29 November 1929; Turin, Italy
- Died: 2 April 1965 (aged 35); Prangins, Switzerland
- Education: Harvard University
- Parents: Edoardo Agnelli (father); Virginia Bourbon del Monte (mother)

Giorgio Agnelli (29 November 1929 – 2 April 1965) was a member of the Agnelli family.

== Early life and family ==
Born in Turin, Agnelli was the second son and sixth child of Virginia Agnelli (born Donna Virginia Bourbon del Monte) and of the industrialist Edoardo Agnelli. Until 1996, his older brother Gianni Agnelli was the head of Fiat S.p.A., which was founded by Giovanni Agnelli. He studied at Harvard University in the United States. Unlike the other members of the family, he could not participate in industrial and financial activities due to a serious illness. Considered a family rebel along with Edoardo Agnelli, the eldest child and only son of Gianni and Marella Agnelli who also did not participate in the family business and died by suicide at the age of 46, he was described as caring about his family and suffered from being marginalized.

== Death ==
Agnelli died at age 35 in a Swiss clinic in Prangins at Lake Geneva, where he had been treated for a long time. According to the poet Marta Vio, who was his companion for ten years, he had long suffered from schizophrenia. They met in 1946 on the beach of Forte dei Marmi, the holiday resort of the Agnelli family. Giorgio's official cause of death has never been confirmed by the family. Marta Vio maintained that Giorgio committed suicide by jumping from the clinic's window. According to a family member, Giorgio died in the clinic as a result of sleep therapy, a common treatment for schizophrenia in the 1960s before the development of pharmaceutical cures.
