= Susanna Agnelli =

Italian politician, businesswoman, and writer (1922–2009)

Susanna Agnelli OMRI
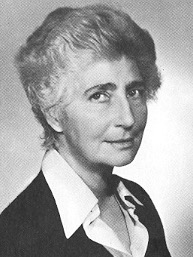

Minister of Foreign Affairs
- In office 17 January 1995 – 17 May 1996
- Prime Minister: Lamberto Dini
- Preceded by: Antonio Martino
- Succeeded by: Lamberto Dini

Undersecretary of the Ministry of Foreign Affairs
- In office 9 August 1983 – 11 April 1991
- Prime Minister: Bettino Craxi; Giovanni Goria; Ciriaco De Mita; Giulio Andreotti

Member of the Senate of the Republic
- In office 12 July 1983 – 22 April 1992
- Constituency: Piedmont

Member of the European Parliament
- In office 17 July 1979 – 1 October 1981
- Constituency: North-West Italy

Member of the Chamber of Deputies
- In office 5 July 1976 – 11 July 1983
- Constituency: Como

Mayor of Monte Argentario
- In office 8 July 1974 – 20 October 1984
- Preceded by: Ettore Zolesi
- Succeeded by: Florio Zolesi

Personal details
- Born: 24 April 1922 Turin, Italy
- Died: 15 May 2009 (aged 87) Rome, Italy
- Party: PRI
- Spouse: Count Urbano Rattazzi Jr. (m. 1945; div. 1975)
- Children: 6
- Parents: Edoardo Agnelli (father); Virginia Bourbon del Monte (mother)
- Occupation: Entrepreneur, philanthropist, politician, writer

Susanna Agnelli, Contessa Rattazzi (24 April 1922 – 15 May 2009) was an Italian politician, businesswoman, and writer. Involved in Italian politics for over twenty years, she was the first woman to be appointed Italian Minister of Foreign Affairs. She was also the first Italian minister to be Minister of Foreign Affairs and undersecretary of the same ministry.

== Early life ==
Agnelli was born in Turin, the daughter of Edoardo Agnelli and Donna Virginia Bourbon del Monte, a daughter of the Prince of San Faustino and his Kentucky-born wife Jane Allen Campbell. Her grandfather, Giovanni Agnelli, founded Fiat S.p.A. She is the sister of Gianni Agnelli, who was the head of Fiat until 1996; members of the Agnelli family are still the controlling shareholders of the company. Affectionally called Suni, her British governess used to tell her: "Never forget you are an Agnelli."

During World War II, Agnelli worked at times as a nurse for the Red Cross, and when transport became unobtainable in the postwar chaos, she used her connections with Fiat and the Allied military to establish for the Red Cross a fleet of five ambulances with ten drivers to transport injured and sick civilians. Having graduated in literature, she received an honorary degree in law from the Mount Holyoke University in 1984.

== Politics ==
Politically, the Agnelli family sought to create a non-ideological, centrist political formation of Atlanticist and pro-European persuasion that sought a modernizing, internationalist capitalism in contrast to the left and opposed to the populist, nationalist, or fascist right. In 1974, Agnelli gained her first public appointment, when she became mayor of Monte Argentario. Both her great-grandfather and grandfather, Giovanni Agnelli, had been mayors in their time. Agnelli served as mayor for a decade from 1974 to 1984. The experience inspired her to enter national politics. Agnelli was elected to the Italian Parliament in 1976 for the Italian Republican Party (PRI), of which her brother Gianni Agnelli was also a member. In 1979, still for the PRI, she was an MEP in the European Parliament from 1979 to 1981 and sat in the European Liberals and Democrats group. In 1983, she returned to the Italian Parliament, becoming a member of the Senate of the Republic. The culmination of her political career was her appointment as the first female Italian Minister of Foreign Affairs in 1995; it was not until 2013 that Emma Bonino became the next female incumbent of the post. Agnelli served for more than a year, which, in the fragile politics of postwar Italy, makes her one of the longest-serving holders of the office. One of her first meetings was with then United States Secretary of State, Warren Christopher.

Agnelli was active in environmentalist causes. Between the 1970s and 1980s, she was president of the World Wildlife Fund and was the only Italian member of the United Nations (UN) World Commission for the Environment and Development (Brundtland Report), later known as the Brundtland Commission. She also sat on the first board of the UN International Institute for Ageing. Her mayoralty, which included a local left-wing alliance between the self-styled PRI party of enlightened capitalism and the Italian Communist Party, a party that held high esteem for her anti-speculation efforts, was characterized by soil defence. As a mayor, she also expressed her favourable view about the new abortion law in Italy that legalized abortion, for which the city's bishop excommunicated her.

From the early 1990s, Agnelli was president of the Steering Committee of Telethon, which was founded in Italy in 1990. In 1997, she set up the Il Faro Foundation, a non-profit organization that aims to help Italian and foreign young people in difficulty in the labour market. She had a popular mail column titled "Private answers" in the weekly magazine Oggi. In an interview to The Washington Post several years before her death, Agnelli discussed the most difficult part of politics. She said: "Sitting for days listening to people talk, talk, talk. Male politicians can stand up and talk to an empty house, where there are six people reading newspapers. I could never do that. It's such a waste of time."

== Personal life and death ==
In 1945, Agnelli married Count Urbano Rattazzi Jr. (1918–2012), the great-grandson of two-time prime minister Urbano Rattazzi of the Historical Left. They had six children, the youngest of whom is photographer Priscilla Rattazzi, who said Agnelli loved New York City. Until 1960, they lived in Argentina. The marriage was dissolved in 1975. She divided her time between New York and Italy, and she was long a loyal fan of Robert Denning, of Denning & Fourcade, who designed over 15 homes for her in Manhattan, South America, and Italy.

Agnelli died in Rome on 15 May 2009, aged 87. From 3 April 2009, she was hospitalised at the Agostino Gemelli University Policlinic for over a month after severe femoral trauma due to an accidental fall at home. After her death, she was mourned among the main political and cultural actors. Journalist Enzo Biagi described Agnelli thusly: "They call her Suni; she is a courageous woman who above all has one merit: sincerity. Sometimes, in interviews, she too can say hasty things: but she's not a hypocrite or flatterer; she doesn't calculate. In forty days she wrote a book of memories, some even unpleasant: We Dressed in the Sailor Suit. It has sold 255,000 copies, has been translated into other languages, and won the Bancarella Prize."

== Books ==
Agnelli wrote a number of books including Vestivamo alla marinara (1975), Gente alla deriva (1980), Ricordati Gualeguaychu (1982), Addio, addio mio ultimo amore (1985), and Questo libro è tuo (1993). Her 1975 autobiography was a bestseller in Italy and won the Premio Bancarella.

== In popular culture ==
In 2022, Agnelli was the subject of an episode of the RAI docu-series Illuminate.

== Electoral history ==
| Election | House | Constituency | Party | Votes | Result | Notes |
|---|---|---|---|---|---|---|
| 1976 | Chamber of Deputies | Como–Sondrio–Varese | PRI | 7,431 | Elected | |
| 1979 | Chamber of Deputies | Como–Sondrio–Varese | PRI | 3,571 | Elected | |
| 1979 | European Parliament | North-West Italy | PRI | 101,232 | Elected | |
| 1983 | Senate of the Republic | Piedmont – Pinerolo | PRI | 24,508 | Elected | |
| 1987 | Senate of the Republic | Piedmont – Turin Fiat Aeritalia | PRI | 32,275 | Elected | |

== Honours ==
- Honorary Member of the Xirka Ġieħ ir-Repubblika, 18 December 1995.
- Knight Grand Cross of the Order of Merit of the Italian Republic, 21 May 1996.

Political offices
| Preceded by Antonio Martino | Italian Minister of Foreign Affairs; 1995–1996 | Succeeded by Lamberto Dini |
