= Lapo Elkann =

Italian businessman (born 1977)

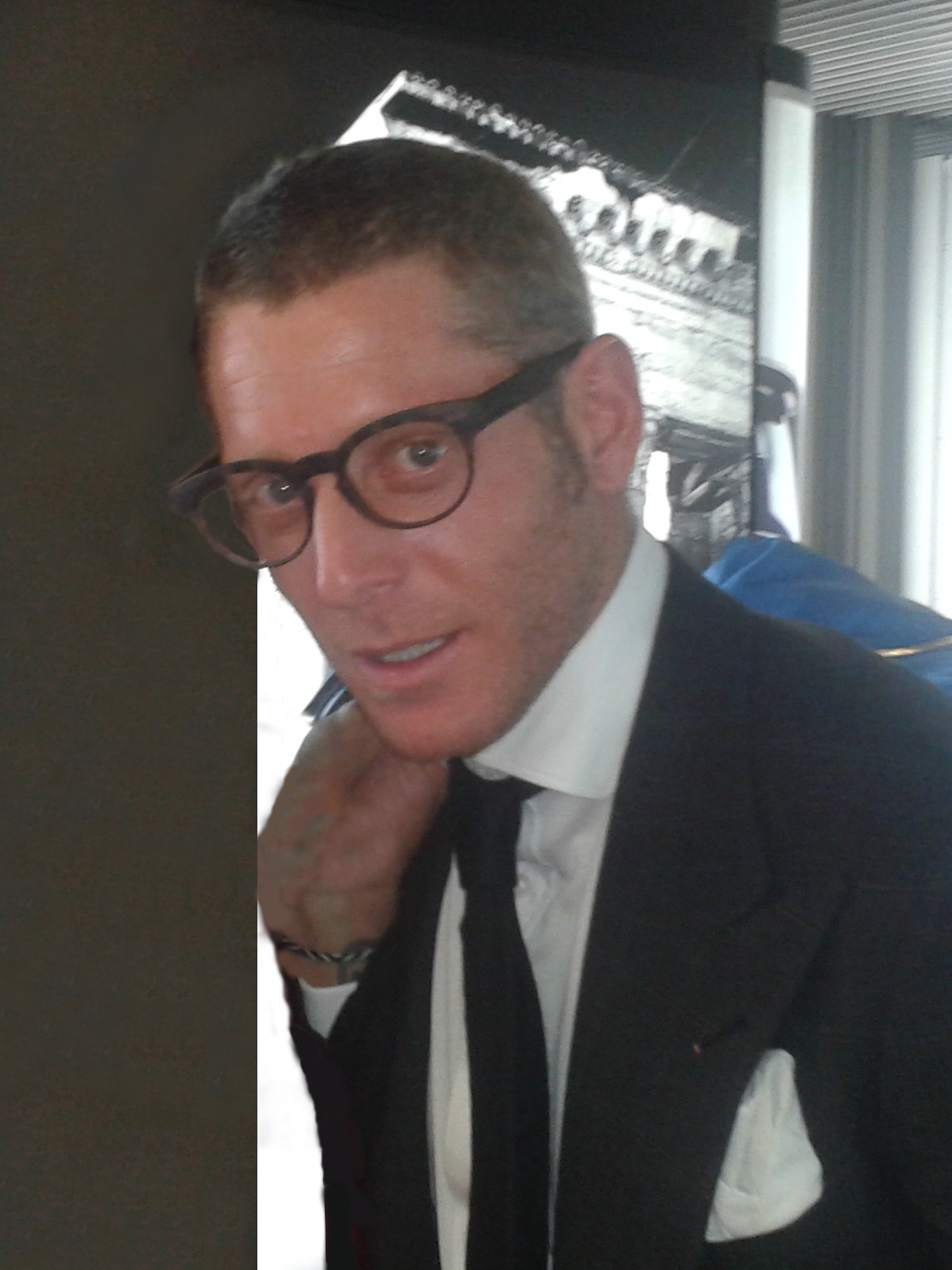
- Elkann in 2014
- Born: Lapo Edovard Elkann; 7 October 1977 (age 49); New York City, U.S.
- Occupations: Chairman of Italia Independent; Director of Fiat Group's brand promotion
- Height: 1.72 m (5 ft 8 in)
- Spouse: Joana Lemos (m. 2021)
- Parents: Margherita Agnelli; Alain Elkann
- Relatives: John Elkann (brother); Ginevra Elkann (sister)
- Family: Elkann family Agnelli family

Lapo Edovard Elkann (born 7 October 1977) is an Italian businessman, philanthropist, and socialite. He is the chairman, founder, and majority shareholder (53.37%) of the Italia Independent Group. He is also the president and founder of Garage Italia Customs and Independent Ideas, as well as a member of the board of directors of Ferrari N.V. and responsible for the promotion of the Fiat Group brand. He is the great-grandson of Fiat S.p.A. founder Giovanni Agnelli, the grandson of Gianni Agnelli, who was the former controlling CEO and controlling shareholder of Fiat Automobiles, and the brother of John Elkann.

== Early life and family ==
A member of the Elkann family and Agnelli family and named after the 12th-century Italian poet Lapo Gianni, Elkann was born in New York City, the son of Countess Margherita Agnelli de Pahlen and the American-born Italian writer Alain Elkann. His father is Jewish and his mother is Catholic. He is the brother of John Elkann, the chairman of Fiat and the chairman and CEO of Exor, an investment company controlled by the Agnelli family, which also owns Juventus FC Elkann is a grandson of Fiat chairman Gianni Agnelli and Marella Agnelli. He is nephew of Don Carlo Caracciolo, member of the House of Caracciolo, founder of Gruppo Editoriale L'Espresso and owner of the newspaper la Repubblica, the Italian daily general-interest newspaper. Elkann is also a stepson of a Russian nobleman, Count Sergei de Pahlen. Elkann has a filmmaker sister, Ginevra Elkann, and five half-siblings by his mother's second marriage. They are Maria, Pierre, Sophia, Anna, and Tatiana. He is a great-grandnephew of Ettore Ovazza, of the Ovazza banking family, via his grandmother, Carla Ovazza.

In a discussion about his childhood with Silvia Toffanin, Elkann said: "I didn't love it very much. I was a dyslexic, hyperactive child, suffering from attention deficit, and since I was always behind at school, I wanted to prove that I was strong." He graduated from the lycée et collège Victor-Duruy in Paris and from the European Business School London in international relations. He performed military service in the Alpini corps as a soldier in the Alpine Brigade "Taurinense". According to those who know him and his older brother well, they spoke of many similarities, such as the attachment to the family and particularly the grandfather, but also of many differences. In 2004, the elder Elkann was described as serious and rigorous, in contrast to the expansive and creative younger Elkann, who was in charge of operational marketing at Fiat, where he arrived at work at the Mirafiori plant every morning in a Fiat Panda rather than a Lancia Ypsilon, the model he personally helped to launch. From their father, the two Elkanns share the Jewish faith, which represented the first time that young heirs brought with them values and ethics that were different from those of the Catholic Agnelli family.

== Career ==
As is tradition in the education of the offspring of the Agnelli family, Elkann began his career in 1994 as a metal worker on the assembly line of Piaggio in Pontedera under the pseudonym of Lapo Rossi. During this period, he also participated in a strike action to demand an improvement of the uncomfortable working conditions in the assembly line. In 2001, Elkann worked as a personal assistant to Henry Kissinger, who had just been appointed chairman of the 9/11 Commission and was an old friend of his grandfather, Gianni Agnelli. He subsequently continued his work experience, which he started with different roles in Salomon Smith Barney and Danone, and worked as marketing associate for Ferrari and Maserati, where he spent four and a half years at the marketing office. Following Agnelli's worsening health conditions, Elkann decided to return to Italy in 2002 to be close to him. In 2003, he became Fiat's director of marketing.

Upon joining Fiat, Elkann asked to be able to take care of corporate promotion and communication, believing that the Fiat brand was suffering in this field, especially in the youth sector. He promoted the group's image by launching different types of gadgets, including sweatshirts worn by himself, with the vintage logo of the car manufacturer, and the launch of the Fiat Grande Punto. In 2004, with the appointment of his brother John Elkann as the group's vice-chairman, he became responsible for promotion for the three brands: Fiat, Alfa Romeo, and Lancia. In this period, he oversaw the worldwide launch of the new Fiat 500. Elkann resigned from his position in 2005. This came after it was widely reported that he had a serious cocaine and heroin addiction.

After a period of treatment, Elkann returned to Italy in January 2007. Along with Andrea Tessitore and Giovanni Accongiagioco, he founded Italia Independent, a company specializing in the production and sale of luxury eyewear, accessories, and clothing under the initials I–I, characterized by the possibility offered to the buyer to customize the product to be purchased. The first product, presented at Pitti Men in January 2007, was an eyewear model made entirely of carbon fibre. The company then developed a line of clothing, accessories, and with several collaborations in home and automotive decorations. In addition to eyewear, also launched were jewellery, a watch, a bicycle, and a skateboard for urban transport. The company was listed on the Milan Stock Exchange, on the AIM segment, on 28 June 2013.

On 4 July 2007, Elkann founded the Independent Ideas creative agency with Alberto Fusignani and Ivanmaria Vele, whose activity was documented for three months in the Idee in progress program of the satellite television channel Fox Life. From 30 October 2007 to June 2008, he was honorary president of the Italian Volleyball League club Sparkling Volley Milano; he is an international ambassador for the Milan Triennale, an ambassador for Tel HaShomer Hospital in Tel Aviv, and a board member of various companies, such as the auction house Phillips.

Elkann and the Independent Ideas agency collaborated with the Centro Stile Fiat and Frida Giannini in the "500 by Gucci" project, launched in Milan on 23 February 2011, and at the Geneva Motor Show on 1 March 2011. In October 2011, he received the America Award from the Italy–USA Foundation. In December 2011, Elkann launched the Ferrari Tailor Made project together with Luca Cordero di Montezemolo to build a tailor-made Ferrari, personalized on the specific requests of the customer. He also started a partnership project with ToyWatch, at the time owned by Gianluca Vacchi, producing a special edition of 1,007 ToyWatch watches combined with Italia Independent sunglasses from the I-Wear series. A Second Unique Edition followed the next year. In July 2013, he was honoured with the Automotive Hall of Fame's Young Leader & Excellence Award, the first member of the Agnelli family to receive it after his great-great-grandfather, Giovanni Agnelli.

In January 2017, Elkann joined the board of directors of Ferrari N.V., the holding company that controls the homonymous car manufacturer. In December 2017, he inaugurated Garage Italia Food & Restaurant in Piazzale Accursio in Milan, in an old Agip service station built by Mario Bacciocchi in the 1950s and renovated by Michele De Lucchi. The restaurant was a joint venture with chef Carlo Cracco to combine food and motoring events, that was announced in 2015. In April 2019, the restaurant closed and the company came entirely under the control of Laps to Go, Elkann's holding company. In February 2019, the venture capital fund Talent EuVeca, chaired by Giovanna Dossena, entered Italia Independent with a capital increase, which in the meantime became Italia Independent Group after it closed the 2018 financial statements with income in the red, and had to sell various assets. Dossena came to hold 25.44% while Elkann remained the largest shareholder at 53.92%.

Italia Independent Group closed 2021 with a turnover of €11.54 million, an increase of 1.7% compared to the €11.35 million obtained in the previous year. The final result was negative for €24.1 million, compared to the loss of €2.81 million recorded in 2020, as a result of write-downs and provisions for €18.12 million. At the end of December 2021, net debt had risen to €19.28 million, compared to €15.55 million at the beginning of the year. In a press release, the company said: "Despite the commitment made by management and the support of shareholders, Italia Independent has not managed to achieve the results envisaged in the business plans also due to external circumstances which have further aggravated the situation: the Covid emergency and the consequent lockdowns in various geographies, the instability of the markets, and the adverse macroeconomic context which has caused an increase and difficulty in procuring raw materials and the consequent growth in inflation." The statement added that "the company is open to evaluating reasonable measures such as to favour the redeployment of employees."

== Interests ==
=== Art collection ===
Elkann is an art lover with a collection of contemporary art that includes original paintings by Andy Warhol, Jean-Michel Basquiat, Damien Hirst, Roy Lichtenstein, and rising contemporary artists, such as Teddy McDonald and Ian Berry, who made his portrait out of denim.

=== Car marketing and customization ===
Elkann coordinated marketing for the Fiat Punto, Fiat Grande Punto, and Fiat 500. For Garage Italia Customs, an atelier that he founded in 2015, and that customizes cars, he was behind the Vintage Icon-e, the Fiat 500's electric car, and the Fiat Panda's electric versions, and also created a grass-like green Fiat 500, a golden Fiat 500 for Paco Rabanne, a special, limited edition in 1958 units of the Fiat 500 Spiaggina '58, and KarMasutra's Fiat 500 special edition.

In 2011, Elkann worked with Gucci's creative director, Frida Giannini, on developing the Gucci Special Edition of the Fiat 500, and consulted with Ferrari, running Ferrari Tailor Made, which enables customers to customize their car. This was followed by the Abarth 500 Pied de Poule, which was acquired in 2020 for €37,700 from a Swiss investment vehicle launched by the Jalopy LTD fund. In 2015, he designed the Fiat 500X Black Tie. This was followed in 2016 by a special BMW i8 Futurism Edition, which was presented to BMW's design director Adrian van Hooydonk.

=== Fashion ===
In 2007, Elkann created Italia Independent, a lifestyle and clothing brand featuring Italian products. That same year, he founded Independent Ideas, a communication and advertising agency. In 2011, Italia Independent and ToyWatch of Gianluca Vacchi presented a special edition of 1,007 copies of watches called Unique Edition. In June 2013, Elkann listed Italia Independent on the Milan Stock Exchange. In 2017, he and his brother had to reinvest in Italia Independent after its share price plunged from €40 to €4.4 following disappointing sales and mismanagement.

Elkann was elected by Vanity Fair four times in a row in its International Best Dressed List, most recently in 2008, and he was added to its Best Dressed Hall of Fame in 2009; in doing so, he joined his grandparents, Gianni and Marella Agnelli, about whom in 2020 he said: "My grandfather Gianni gave and taught me a lot. He is one of the people I loved the most in my life together with my grandmother Marella." In 2010, Elkann made GQ's list of the world's 25 Sexiest Men. Newsweek described him as having "what the Italians call sprezzatura, the art of making elegance and intelligence so natural they seem accidental."

=== Ferrari ===
Among the many cars owned by Elkann, several of them are Ferraris. A known presence to Formula One Grands Prix, particularly the Italian Grand Prix in Monza, Elkann is a supporter of Scuderia Ferrari, of which his brother serves as chairman through Ferrari. The team's last World Drivers' Championship win dates back to 2007 with Kimi Raikkonen. Before that, Ferrari had a period of dominance in the early 2000s, winning five consecutive World Drivers' Championships with Michael Schumacher and six consecutive World Constructors' Championships under the Schumacher pairings with Eddie Irvine (1999) and Rubens Barrichello (2000–2004), the last of which was won in 2008, between 1999 and 2004. In an interview to Oggi, Elkann said: "[Gianni Agnelli] saved the Prancing Horse, preventing it from being sold to the Americans. Then he chose the right people: [former Ferrari chairman] Luca di Montezemolo and Jean Todt. He loved Ferrari cars and he loved all the beautiful things in life. It's not enough to be rich to appreciate beauty. Taste cannot be bought." About Schumacher, who suffered a skiing accident in 2013, Elkann wished him a happy 54th birthday in 2023 with the message: "Happy birthday to you dear Michael Schumacher. You don't know how much we miss you and how many joys you have given us. We always await you with open arms. You are unique and inimitable."

=== Juventus F.C. ===
Unlike other members of the Agnelli–Elkann family like his brother, John Elkann, and his cousin, Andrea Agnelli, Elkann did not hold any role in the association football club Juventus. (Note: Juventus is the most renowned Italian football club. Into the 21st century, the club had won all six major UEFA competitions, reached four UEFA Champions League finals from 1995 to 2003 and consecutively from 1995 to 1998, was voted the seventh best of the FIFA Club of the Century in 2000, and in 2009 was named the second best club of the 20th century; by the early 2000s, the club had the third best revenue in Europe at over €200 million. This all changed in 2006, when Calciopoli controversially hit the club, which was demoted to Serie B for the first time in its history despite the club being acquitted and the leagues were ruled to be regular in the Calciopoli trials. In the words of Fulvio Bianchi, early 2000s Juventus were "stronger than all those that came after, and had €250 million in revenue, being at the top of Europe, and 100 sponsors. It took ten years to recover and return to the top Italians, not yet Europeans: now the club makes over €300 million, but in the meantime Real, Bayern, and the others have taken off." Several observers, including former FIGC president Franco Carraro, said things would have gone much different had the two Agnelli brothers been alive. The argument is that Calciopoli and its aftermath were also a dispute within Juventus and between the club's owners that came after the deaths of Elkann's grandfather, Gianni Agnelli, and his great-uncle, Umberto Agnelli, including Franzo Grande Stevens and Gianluigi Gabetti who favoured Elkann's younger brother, John Elkann, over his cousin Andrea Agnelli as chairman, and wanted to get rid of Luciano Moggi, Antonio Giraudo, and Roberto Bettega, whose shares in the club increased; Elkann was critical of the club's top three directors, saying in 2005 they remembered him of Cain and Abel, and said: "Just think that Moggi is the nicest of them all. It's enough for you to understand my opinion on the Juve management." Whatever their intentions, it is argued they condemned Juventus: first when Carlo Zaccone, the club's lawyer, agreed for relegation to Serie B and point-deduction, when he made that statement because Juventus were the only club risking more than one-division relegation (Serie C), and he meant for Juventus (the sole club to be ultimately demoted) to have equal treatment with the other clubs; and then when Luca Cordero di Montezemolo retired the club's appeal to the Regional Administrative Court of Lazio, for which then-FIFA president Sepp Blatter was thankful, and that could have cleared the club's name and avoid relegation, after FIFA and UEFA threatened to suspend the FIGC from international play. Upon the club's return to Serie A in May 2007, after having received the Golden Tapir by Striscia la notizia, Elkann said: "I will face Serie A with greater serenity and greater happiness. It gives us more peace of mind knowing that victories and battles are won on the pitch.") He remains a supporter of the club, got the club's emblem tattooed on his right arm, among his many tattoos, and engages with tifosi on social media. In February 2023, some observers and commentators, after the club's technocratic management was over, made the name of Elkann as a future Juventus chairman; both Exor, the family holding company, and Elkann denied this. That same month, he criticized Evelina Christillin, a member of the FIFA Council, for her negative comments about the budget situation of the club. (Note: About Juventus in 2023, which saw the resignation of the entire board of directors including chairman Andrea Agnelli after the reopening of a capital gains investigation that saw an unprecedented penalty-points for the club, Elkann said: "A Shame. United and Firm we will win. Unfortunately, justice is not the same for EVERYONE but it should." He added: "The sun will rise very soon for us, we must have faith to be united and firm. Forza Juve until the end. We have been through storms and many difficulties, we will come back stronger than ever. But above all, to all of you Tifosi, I tell you we need each of you more than never. Forza Juventus forever and until the end." About the public prosecutor who was recorded on video saying he hated Juventus and that he was an anti-Juventus prosecutor, he said: "I am only with respect curious that this PM says things like this. This is not justice but defamation towards a team that has done so much." About insults to his family, he replied: "They are shameful beings, Edoardo was GREAT and I carry him in my heart every day. He was sensitive, good, pure, and true with his fragility like all of us." To those who would like to call him president, in what would be his first role in the club, he replied: "Thank you from the bottom of my heart.")

=== Yachting ===
Elkann shares his grandfather's love for yachting, which served as inspiration for his home in Milan. The house was subject of a photoshoot by Architectural Digest. About his inspiration from the nautical world, he said: "I don't like houses, so I decided that this place would be redesigned to look like a ship and evoke the ocean."

== Politics ==
Elkann said he is not interested in politics and that it is not his job. In October 2019, he was involved in a diatribe with Matteo Salvini, who had mocked him by referring his past drug abuse. Elkann criticized Salvini's anti-immigrant policies and rhetoric. He said: "I am in favour of NGOs that help people at sea. I also find it quite shameful that none of the institutions were present in Lampedusa due to the tragedy of migrants that has taken place – as an Italian it makes me sad. ... I don't like the word migrants, it seems to me disparaging and not respectful. I like the word new Italians. I don't like Salvini, I don't like his behavior on the issue of migrants because I consider it dissolutive and not constructive." About the role of Europe, he said: "Italy is the country that has the largest number of people arriving from various areas of the world where there are wars, suffering, and pain. We are the first to receive them, and Sicily is the area that receives the most. Europe must help and support Italy more."

== Personal life ==
Elkann is 1.72 m (5 ft 8 in) tall. Of Jewish ancestry through his father's side, he converted to Judaism in 2009. About his faith, Elkann told Verissimo: "I believe in God, and I pray a lot. I also feel close to the Jewish world, because first of all they saved me. And then I adore Israel." Passionate about new technologies and languages, he learned over the years to speak Italian, French, English, Portuguese, and Spanish. He said his best friend is his brother, John Elkann.

Elkann had many romances that were widely reported by gossip magazines. He had relationships with actress Martina Stella, socialite Bianca Brandolini d'Adda, businesswoman Goga Ashkenazi, actress Zhu Zhu, and gallerist Carlotta Loverini Botta. From 2016 to 2017, he dated Iranian-German model Shermine Shahrivar. By 2020, he was single, wished to become a father, and said that if he had a daughter, he would like to call her Italia. On 7 October 2021, Elkann married the Portuguese former rally raid racer Joana Lemos, and they moved to Lisbon. He met Lemos during a 2020 dinner in Portugal. Through the previous marriage of Lemos to Manuel Reymão Nogueira, which ended in 2014 after 18 years, Elkann is the stepfather of two children: Tomás and Martim.

On 11 October 2005, Elkann was hospitalized in serious condition in the intensive care unit of the Mauriziano Hospital in Turin due to an overdose of a mix of opiates and cocaine after a night in the company of several people, including a transgender woman who was the first to call an ambulance. Subsequently, he resigned from his positions in Fiat and moved to Arizona, where he began rehabilitation therapy, to continue with a period of convalescence in a family residence in Miami. About his past addictions, Elkann told Verissimo: "When you are alone, at a certain point you don't know how to deal with fragility. Substances destroy your life, and I have had problems. For me, the substance use was a way to anesthetize a pain I felt in me. Unfortunately I paid the consequences several times. I've done enough harm to myself, from now on I want more."

In December 2019, Elkann was involved in a car accident in Tel Aviv, where he was hospitalized; he was there on a road trip. After recovering from a ten-day coma, he moved to a clinic in Switzerland, and was seen on a wheelchair for a while; the accident led him to a change of lifestyle. In addition to working with the Laps Foundation, a non-profit organization created in 2016 in support of children with dyslexia, learning disabilities, abuses, addictions, and discriminations, he was involved in supporting the Italian Red Cross in the donations of shopping vouchers intended for the most needy families during the COVID-19 pandemic in Italy. He said: "I've decided to change my life, to help others, support others and do everything I can." The campaign, which raised over €400,000, won the 2021 UEFA Foundation for Children award. Through Laps, he leased a Boeing to take 150 Ukrainian refugees to safety, along with ten dogs and five cats, in April 2022.

In October 2013, Elkann gave an interview to Beatrice Borromeo, of Il Fatto Quotidiano, in which he said that he had suffered sexual abuse at the age of 13 when he had been sent to study in a Jesuit college; the Jesuits denied that he was one of their students. In an October 2020 interview to the Corriere della Sera, Elkann described his mother, Margherita Agnelli de Pahlen, as struggling with self-harm and accused her of destroying the family, having it split in two. Into the 2020s, the de Pahlens remain involved in a dispute with the Elkanns over Gianni Agnelli's inheritance. The lawsuit proceedings started in November 2022.

== Legal issues ==
In October 2005, Elkann was found unconscious and naked in the apartment of Donato Broco, who was described as a 53-year-old transgender prostitute known as Patrizia. He was brought to the hospital, where he was in a coma for three days. Police investigated him at the time for cocaine use and soliciting prostitution. The Italian photographer Fabrizio Corona attempted to blackmail the Agnelli family for compromising information against Elkann. Marco Durante, head of LaPresse, an international photographic agency, was hired by the Agnelli family to negotiate with Corona and manage the situation.

In early December 2014, as reported by Il Giorno, Elkann was secretly filmed during a party with two brothers who allegedly blackmailed him in exchange for silence. The two blackmailers were arrested and Elkann's lawyer contested the derogatory statements against his client.

On 27 November 2016, as reported by the New York Daily News, The Daily Beast, and The Hollywood Reporter, Elkann was arrested in New York City, after a drug and sex party in Manhattan, for making a false police report claiming that he had been unlawfully imprisoned. After having run out of money available to him, he contacted his family; according to what a United States official told the Associated Press, Elkann stated that he would be harmed if they did not pay a $10,000 ransom. He was accompanied by a transsexual escort who was also arrested, and Elkann later confessed that he made up the story. Charges against Elkann and the escort were later dropped.

On 12 September 2020, Elkann was stopped twice by the police. The first case was due to speeding in a Ferrari, while the second time he was found in possession of three to four grams of cocaine.

== Ancestry ==
Ancestors of Lapo Elkann

16. Isaac Elkann
8. Armand Elkann
17. Marie-Anne Dreyfuss
4. Jean-Paul Elkann
9. Berthe Bloch
2. Alain Elkann
20. Ernesto Ovazza
10. Vittorio Ovazza
21. Celeste Malvano
5. Carla Ovazza
22. Alessandro Fubini
11. Olga Fubini
23. Albina de Benedetti
1. Lapo Elkann
24. Giovanni Agnelli
12. Edoardo Agnelli
25. Clara Boselli
6. Giovanni Agnelli
26. Carlo Bourbon del Monte, 4th Prince of San Faustino
13. Donna Virginia Bourbon del Monte
27. Jane Allen Campbell
3. Margherita Agnelli
28. Nicola Caracciolo, 2nd Duke of Melito
14. Filippo Caracciolo, 8th Prince of Castagneto, 3rd Duke of Melito
29. Meralda Mele Barese
7. Donna Marella Caracciolo di Castagneto
30. Charles Corning Clarke
15. Margaret Clarke
31. Alice Chandler

== Books ==
- Elkann, Lapo; Gattermeyer, Michela (2012). Le regole del mio stile (in Italian). Turin: Add. ISBN 978-8-8968-7387-8 – via Google Books.
