= Elkann =

Elkann is a French-Jewish surname. Notable people with the surname include:

- Alain Elkann (born 1950), an Italian novelist and journalist of Jewish descent, with French and American lineage
- Ginevra Elkann (born 1979), an apprentice film director, granddaughter of Gianni Agnelli
- John Elkann (born 1976), an Italian industrialist, grandson of the late Gianni Agnelli, heir to the automaker Fiat
- Lapo Elkann (born 1977), a New York-born Italian industrialist, former marketing manager

== See also ==
- Elkan, a surname and given name
