= John Elkann =

Italian businessman (born 1976)

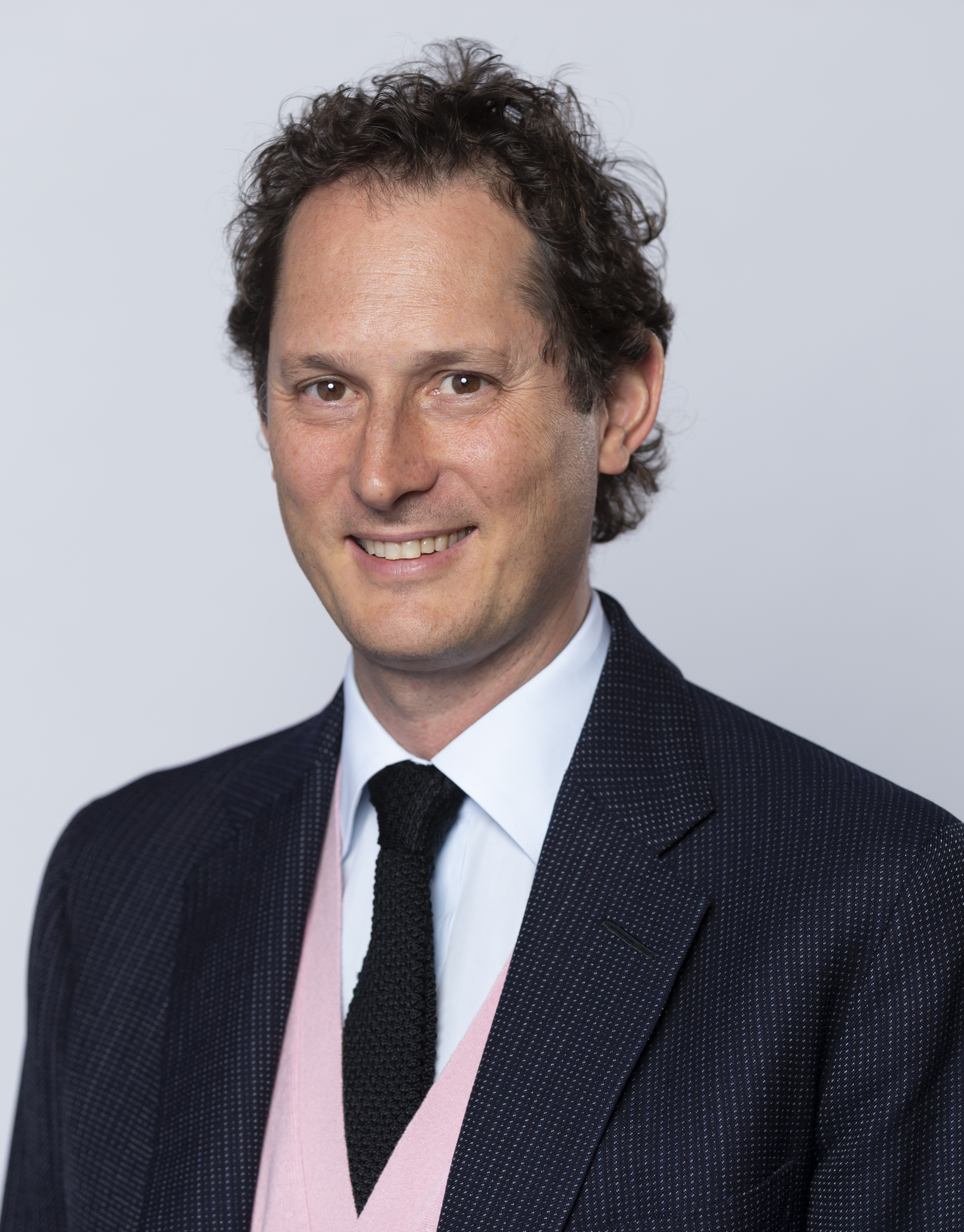
- Elkann in 2019
- Born: John Philip Jacob Elkann; 1 April 1976 (age 50); New York City, New York, U.S.
- Citizenship: Italy; United States (until 2012)
- Education: Polytechnic University of Turin
- Occupations: Stellantis (chairman); Exor (CEO); Ferrari (chairman)
- Spouse: Lavinia Borromeo (m. 2004)
- Children: 3
- Parents: Margherita Agnelli; Alain Elkann
- Relatives: Lapo Elkann (brother); Ginevra Elkann (sister)
- Family: Elkann family; Agnelli family; Borromeo family (by marriage)

John Philip Jacob Elkann (born 1 April 1976) is an American-born Italian industrialist. In 1997, he became the chosen heir of his maternal grandfather Gianni Agnelli, following the death of Gianni's nephew Giovanni Alberto Agnelli, and since 2004 has been leading the Agnelli family, an Italian multi-industry business dynasty. The Agnelli family has been described in media as comparable to the Kennedy family in terms of prominence in national affairs.

Elkann chairs the automaker Stellantis and is the chief executive officer (CEO) of Exor, the holding company controlled by the Agnelli family, which also holds a controlling stake in Ferrari, CNH Industrial, Iveco, Juventus FC and The Economist Group. In July 2018, he was appointed chairman of Ferrari, and briefly was CEO from 2020 to 2021. In 2021, Elkann oversaw the merger between Fiat Chrysler and the PSA Group. He is the leader of a group that controls 14 brands, with production sites in 29 countries, employs 400,000 people, and is present in over 130 markets.

== Early life ==
Born in New York City on 1 April 1976, Elkann held both Italian and U.S. citizenship; he renounced the latter in 2012. He is the eldest son of Alain Elkann, a New York-born journalist and writer of French-Jewish origin and Italian-Jewish background, and his Italian wife Margherita Agnelli. His parents divorced in 1981 and both have remarried. Elkann's maternal grandparents were the head of Fiat S.p.A., Gianni Agnelli, and the socialite Marella Agnelli (born Donna Marella Caracciolo di Castagneto); his great-grandfather was the industrialist Edoardo Agnelli, and his great-great-grandfather was Giovanni Agnelli, founder of Fiat S.p.A. His paternal great-grand-uncle was the banker Ettore Ovazza. He has a brother, Lapo Elkann, and a sister, Ginevra Elkann.

Elkann had attended primary school in both the United Kingdom, and Brazil, before his family moved to Paris, where he obtained a baccalauréat scientifique at the State School Lycée Victor-Duruy in 1994. Later that same year, he moved to Italy to attend the Polytechnic University of Turin, where he graduated with a degree in management engineering in 2000; his thesis was on e-commerce and online auctions. Elkann has cited figures such as Gianluigi Gabetti, Sergio Marchionne, Warren Buffett, and the Wallenberg family as key influences on his education and early career. He is fluent in Italian, English, French, and Portuguese.

== Career ==
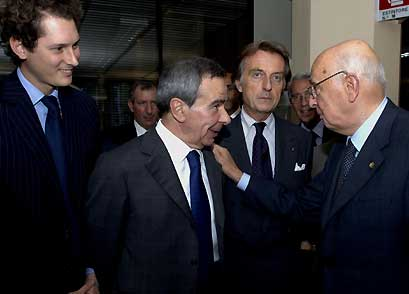
From left to right: Elkann, Giulio Anselmi, Luca di Montezemolo, and Italian president Giorgio Napolitano, 25 October 2006

In December 1997, at the age of 21, he was selected as the heir of his grandfather Gianni Agnelli in place of Giovanni Alberto Agnelli, the son of Gianni's younger brother, Umberto Agnelli, who had died at the age of 33. He was appointed to the Fiat S.p.A. board that same year, when he was 22, the same age his grandfather Gianni also joined it in 1943, and to the board of Giovanni Agnelli Sapaz (now Giovanni Agnelli B.V.), the family partnership controlling Exor.

In 2000, after graduating in engineering from the Polytechnic University of Turin, he joined General Electric's Corporate Audit program. He left General Electric two years later; Elkann described his work at General Electric as "a beautiful experience, because you sit around a table where no one speaks your language and two out of three come from another continent." He moved back to Turin to be closer to his ageing grandfather, as well as to the family business. In 2003, Elkann joined IFIL, which later became Exor, where he was in charge of control and development, and was in particular responsible for supervising Rinascente and Alpitour. Elkann worked on the turnaround of Fiat Group. He was instrumental in the appointment of Fiat Chrysler Automobiles (FCA) CEO Sergio Marchionne in May 2004.

After the death of Gianni Agnelli in 2003, which was followed by that of Elkann's great-uncle Umberto Agnelli in 2004, Elkann became vice-chairman of Fiat and vice-chairman of Giovanni Agnelli Sapaz. Franzo Grande Stevens and Gianluigi Gabetti were instrumental in the appointment of Elkann. In 2008, Elkann was seen as "the great unknown", and he replaced 83-year-old Gabetti as the head of IFIL, which managed a portfolio worth eight billion euros. In March 2009, he merged the holding companies IFI and IFIL to create Exor, stepping to the role of chairman. In 2010, he became chairman of Fiat S.p.A. (then FCA), succeeding Luca Cordero di Montezemolo, and chairman of the Giovanni Agnelli Sapaz, succeeding Gabetti; at the time, Fiat had changed four CEOs in three years. Before this appointment, he mainly played a background role at Fiat. The Financial Times characterized Elkann's appointment as "a confirmation of change that could prove to be the making of a new Fiat and also of the Agnelli family's future fortunes."

In February 2011, Elkann was appointed chairman and CEO of Exor. The value of the company's assets has grown and multiplied nine times in ten years. Since 2017, Elkann became chairman of Ferrari, GEDI Gruppo Editoriale, and the Giovanni Agnelli Foundation, a philanthropic institution supporting education. He is an active member of several non-profit organizations and think tanks engaged in the global geopolitical debate, one of the founders of the Collège des Ingénieurs Italia, and a trustee of the Museum of Modern Art. A member of the Confindustria presidential committee, he followed Fiat's decision to leave the group and resigned from his role as vice-chairman in October 2011, three months before Fiat's official departure in January 2012, "in the interests of the Association's autonomy and independence", as written in his resignation letter to then-president Emma Marcegaglia. In a 2013 interview to the Detroit Free Press, Elkann identified Bill Ford Jr. as a mentor. That same year, he was included by Fortune in the world's most influential managers under the age of 40.

In a November 2013 interview to Campden FB, Elkann said he wanted to change capitalism. He said: "There is an alternative to financial investors and professional investment managers, and that's what we want to be. You need to be able to portray business to society in a favourable way. All the emphasis has been on shareholder value, not stakeholder value. One of the benefits of family businesses is they focus on all stakeholders." In 2015, Elkann acquired the insurer company PartnerRe and took part in Ferrari’s debut as a listed company in stock exchange in Wall Street.

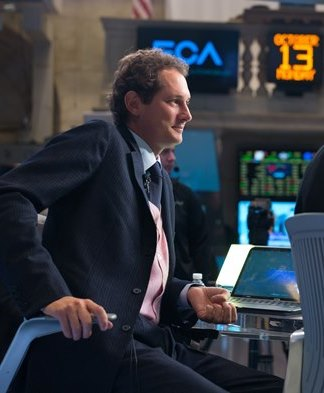
Elkann at the New York Stock Exchange in 2014

Having previously held a seat on Rupert Murdoch's News Corp board and an inherited seat on the board of RCS Media Group, Elkann acquired a majority stake in The Economist Group in 2015; he was described as the opposite of fellow media mogul Silvio Berlusconi. Under Elkann's management, Exor purchased the controlling stake in GEDI Gruppo Editoriale from CIR Group for $113 million in 2019; GEDI is the owner of two of Italy's most influential newspapers, namely the Rome-based, liberal-leaning La Repubblica and the centrist, Turin-based La Stampa.

In July 2018, a few days before the death of Marchionne, Elkann was chosen to take his place at Ferrari. In 2019, Elkann announced he would be trying to merge FCA with Peugeot S.A. (PSA Group), with the goal of forming the world's fourth largest OEM by volume and third largest by revenues, and catch up on electric cars, as well as autonomous vehicles. In May 2019, he tried to also enlist Renault. In December 2019, it was announced that FCA and Peugeot had reached an agreement to merge. In July 2020, he and FCA's CEO Mike Manley announced that the name of the combined company would be Stellantis.

In March 2020, Elkann and FCA's board of directors agreed to forego their remaining compensation for 2020 due to the COVID-19 pandemic. Between December 2020 and September 2021, following the resignation of Louis Camilleri, he held the position of CEO of Ferrari until the appointment of Benedetto Vigna. In May 2021, Elkann was nominated Knight of the Order of Merit for Labour in the automotive industry by Italy's president Sergio Mattarella. In 2021, Forbes estimated his net worth to be around US$2 billion.

In two January 2023 interviews to La Repubblica and La Stampa, in remembrance of the twenty years since Gianni's death, Elkann said: "If we compare the company in 2003 and today's we see that revenues go from 22 billion to 130 in the first nine months of 2022 alone; there were 22 car models produced then, which employed 49,000 people, for 4 brands: today 280,000 people produce over 100 models for 14 brands. We have enhanced the Fiat brand, so much so that next year the electric 500 will also be exported to the USA. We have relaunched the Maserati and Alfa Romeo brands and we are relaunching Lancia. Furthermore, today we produce in Italy and sell models of highly successful non-Italian brands, such as Jeep, all over the world." On 15 May 2023 he announced as a founder the launch of Lingotto, an investment management company fully owned by Exor and headquartered in London.

In January 2025, Elkann was appointed a board director at Meta Platforms.

== Sports ==
=== Juventus F.C. ===
As CEO of Exor, Elkann represents the ownership of association football club Juventus. In 2010, Elkann supported his cousin Andrea Agnelli's bid to become chairman of Juventus.

=== Ferrari ===
As Executive Chairman of Ferrari, Elkann holds a controlling interest in the auto racing team Scuderia Ferrari, the company's auto racing division, which competes in Formula One. The team returned to 24 Hours of Le Mans in 2023 after a fifty-year period of absence as a manufacturer and won the centenary edition of the race, repeating the victory in two subsequent years.

== Philanthropy ==
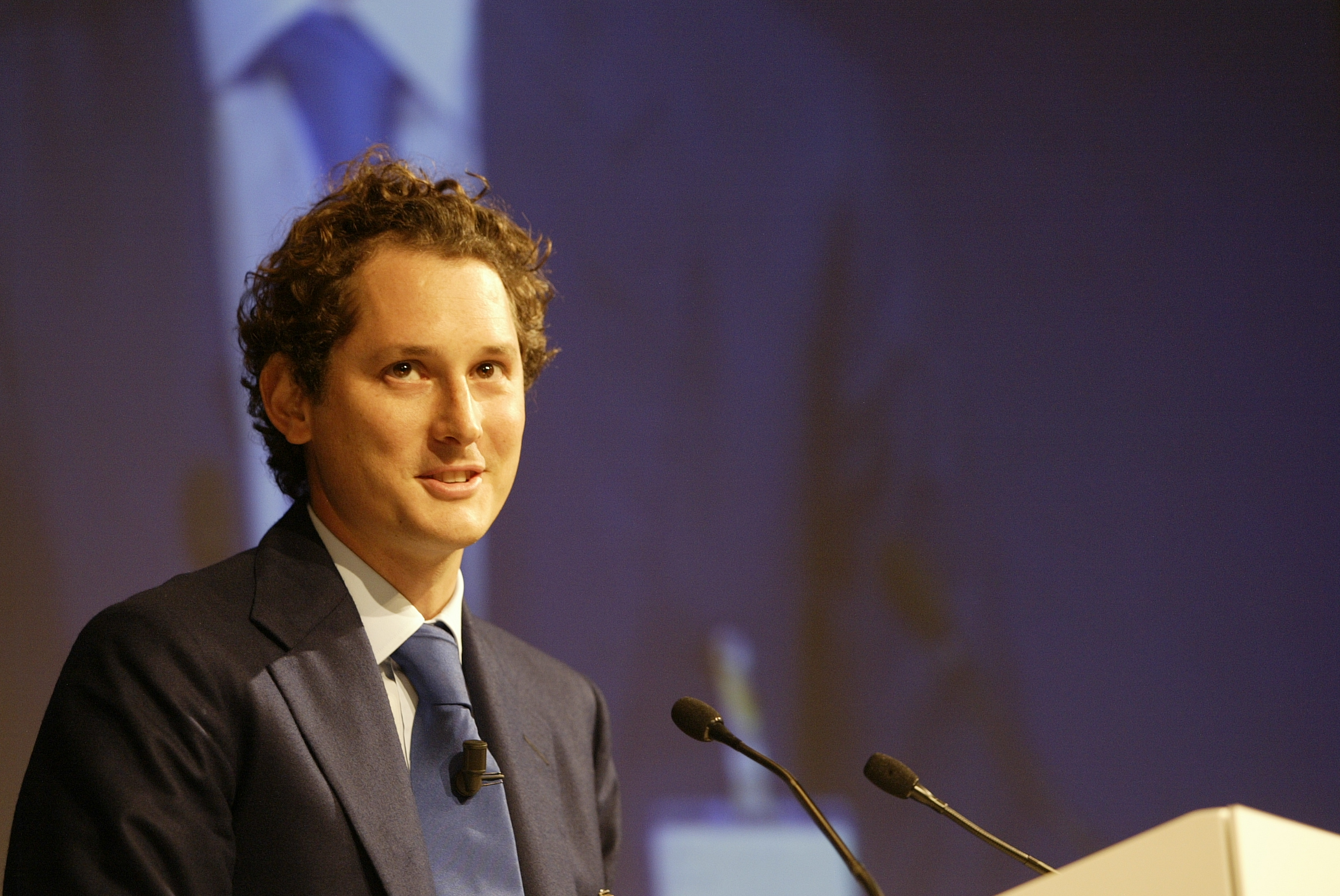
Elkann at the 39th St. Gallen Symposium in 2009

Elkann is chairman of the Agnelli Foundation, a non-profit organization supporting education through scientific research and initiatives.

=== Education and research ===
Since 2014, Fondazione Agnelli has offered Italian students and their families a free online portal where they can find which secondary schools in their area provide the best preparation for university and the workplace. Together with Compagnia di San Paolo through Fondazione Agnelli he launched Torino fa scuola, a project dedicated to the renovation of school buildings in the city area.

Starting from July 2020, Elkann supported the launch and expansion of the Arcipelago Educativo project, co-designed and promoted by the Agnelli Foundation, Exor, and Save the Children to fight the risk of dropping out of students due to the lockdown caused by the COVID-19 pandemic.

In April 2019, along with CERN's Director-General Fabiola Gianotti and the Italian architect Renzo Piano, Elkann participated in a media event to unveil Science Gateway, a new scientific education and outreach centre of CERN, which aims to share knowledge and technology for free with society. The project was funded through external donations, through the Stellantis Foundation as the main supporter. On 21 June 2021 he celebrated a further step forward with the laying of the first stone, and then attended the official inauguration in October 2023, where he remembered Sergio Marchionne, to whom the auditorium of the structure is dedicated.

=== Emergency aid ===
In May 2019, Elkann took part in the 28th edition of the partita del cuore to raise funds for the Piedmontese Foundation for Cancer Research and Italy's Telethon Foundation. In March 2020, to help Italian citizens suffering from the consequences of the COVID-19 pandemic, as the leader of the Agnelli family he deliberated a €10 million donation to the national Civil Protection Department and to La Stampa Foundation – Specchio dei tempi, a social assistance organization that operates in Piedmont, to respond to the local health and social needs in the city of Turin and Piedmont. Elkann and his wife Lavinia are also among the supporters of Crescere Insieme al Sant'Anna, a philanthropic project aiming at expanding and improving the neonatal intensive care unit of the main public pediatric hospital of Turin. On 9 May 2016, the first neonatal intensive care unit was inaugurated.

== Personal life ==
Elkann was baptized and raised Roman Catholic. Nicknamed Jaki, or Yaki, he has lived in the United Kingdom, Brazil, France, and Italy. In 2004, he married Donna Lavinia Borromeo (born Lavinia Ida Borromeo-Arese on 19 March 1977 in Milan), a member of the prominent Italian aristocratic family the House of Borromeo. She is the daughter of Don Carlo Ferdinando Borromeo, Count of Arona, Piedmont (born in 1935), the son of Vitaliano Borromeo, 2nd Prince of Angera. Her half-sister is Beatrice Borromeo, the wife of Pierre Casiraghi, who is eighth in the line of succession to the Monegasque throne. They married on 4 September 2004 in a Catholic ceremony in the Cappella Bianca on Isola Madre, one of the Borromean Islands of Lake Maggiore. They have three children: Leone, Oceano, and Vita, and live in Turin.

=== Innovation and technology ===
An engineer by training, he declares himself passionate about technology and pursues interests in this field. Since 2009, Elkann has been attending the annual media and tech conference organized in July every year by Allen & Co at Sun Valley, Idaho. He is also a regular contributor to the Google Camp, which every year gathers tech entrepreneurs, investors, representatives of institutions and pop stars in Sciacca, Agrigento, and other places around Sicily. In August 2011, he took part, along with Sergio Marchionne, in the Rimini Meeting organized by Communion and Liberation. Until 2020, he was a member of the board Bilderberg Group and the only Italian other than journalist Lilli Gruber. In 2012, Elkann attended the annual meeting of the Bilderberg Group in Chantilly, Virginia.

He is the founder of Wave (formerly known as the Italian Tech Week, founded in 2019), a tech conference for founders, investors, and industry leaders from around the world, that over the years has hosted guests like Elon Musk, Patrick Collison, Brian Chesky, Sam Altman, Jeff Bezos and Dario Amodei. In February 2021, he was a guest on the Italian Tech Speak podcast, where he described his relationship with technology and innovation.

In December 2021, he was included in Bloomberg's list of the "50 most influential people and ideas that defined global business in 2021" for the merger of FCA with the PSA Group to form Stellantis, which started its trading with a $52.7 billion market value.

Through Exor Ventures (formerly known as Exor Seeds), an investment program dedicated to startups, he has invested over 500 million euros in innovation and entrepreneurship projects since 2018. Starting from 2022, through Vento, he is launching venture building calls specifically aimed at young entrepreneurs.

=== Yachting and motorsport ===
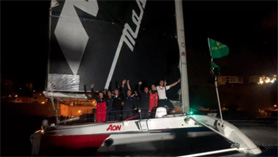
Elkann, Giovanni Soldini, and the Maserati Multi V70 at the finish line of the 2020 Rolex Middle Sea Race

A yachtsman, Elkann took part as owner in the March 2012 Miami–New York City crossing on a monohull of the Maserati team led by Giovanni Soldini, with the aim of covering 947 miles and setting a new record in the monohull category. In May 2012, he and his wife took part in the 30th historical reenactment of the Mille Miglia, a regularity race for historic cars dating back to 1927, which takes place on public roads from Brescia to Rome and back, across six regions of Italy.

In 2013, Elkann participated in the Transpac Race from Los Angeles to Honolulu where he and Soldini ranked second. In the 2014 edition of Cape2Rio, which goes from Cape Town to Rio de Janeiro, Elkann was a member of the team of Soldini that won and set the new speed record of the regatta. In January 2015, he took part with Soldini in the Maserati team in the Rorc Caribbean 600 Race, a regatta that has been held since February throughout the Caribbean; the team had to retire due to damage to the hydraulic system. Soldini stated that a new San Francisco–Shanghai record attempt with the Maserati was expected in May 2015. They succeeded in doing so at 21 days, 19 hours, 32 minutes, and 54 seconds.

In May 2016, Elkann took part in the 100th edition of the Targa Florio car race in Palermo. In January 2020, he participated in the 16th edition of the Cape2Rio aboard Soldini's VOR70 Maserati, sailing 3.600 miles from Cape Town to Rio de Janeiro. In October 2020, once again aboard with Soldini, he won the 41st edition of the Rolex Middle Sea Race with the Maserati Multi 70. In August 2021, he kicked off the 89th edition of the 24 Hours of Le Mans, which saw the participation of the new Le Mans Hypercar, a class in which Ferrari would enter starting from 2023.

== Offices ==
Elkann is the chief executive officer of Exor, the chairman of Stellantis, general partner of Giovanni Agnelli B.V., and the executive chairman of Ferrari. Additionally, he is the chairman of the Giovanni Agnelli Foundation. He is also a trustee of MOMA, a member of Pinacoteca Giovanni e Marella Agnelli, and was a member of the Bilderberg Group. Elkann is a member of the JP Morgan International Council, a board member of Meta Platforms, and was vice-chairman of Italy's Aspen Institute.

== Awards and honours ==
- Appeal of Conscience Award, September 2010.
- Dea Roma Special Achievement Award in Business Leadership, from the National Italian American Foundation (NIAF), October 2025
- Nominated Knight of the Order of Merit for Labour in the Italian automotive industry, May 2021.

== Ancestry ==
Ancestors of John Elkann

8. Armand Elkann
4. Jean-Paul Elkann
9. Berthe Bloch
2. Alain Elkann
10. Vittorio Ovazza
5. Carla Ovazza
11. Olga Fubini
1. John Elkann
12. Edoardo Agnelli
6. Giovanni Agnelli
13. Donna Virginia Bourbon del Monte
3. Margherita Agnelli
14. Filippo Caracciolo, 8th Prince of Castagneto, 3rd Duke of Melito
7. Donna Marella Caracciolo di Castagneto
15. Margaret Clarke

== Bibliography ==
- Clark, Jennifer (21 November 2011). Mondo Agnelli: Fiat, Chrysler, and the Power of a Dynasty. Hoboken, New Jersey: John Wiley & Sons. ISBN 978-1-118-23611-6 – via Google Books.
- Clark, Jennifer (2024). L'ultima dinastia. La saga della famiglia Agnelli da Giovanni a John (in Italian). Milan: Solferino. ISBN 978-88-282-1455-7.
