= Gianluigi Gabetti =

Italian businessman (1924–2019)

Gianluigi Gabetti (29 August 1924 – 14 May 2019) was an Italian businessman. Best known for his long-time role as advisor of the Agnelli family and their related business activities, Gabetti was director general of IFIL Group, the family investment company since 1971 that later became Exor, the holding company of the Agnelli family. He worked there as their closest financial adviser for over thirty years. When Gianni Agnelli died in 2003, his younger brother Umberto Agnelli asked the octogenarian Gabetti to return as CEO of IFIL.

== Early life ==
Gabetti was born in Turin on 29 August 1924, the son of a prefect of Sassari, who met Gabriele D'Annunzio, and of a family originally from Murazzano in the Langhe, where his great-great-grandfather's family moved from Dogliani after the fall of Napoleon, and where he served as an Italian partisan. About the Italian fascist years, Gabetti said: "A harness. A disguise. Fascism disguised Italy: a country dressed up as a fascist, which behaved like a fascist. I heard my grandparents say: 'It's all a farce, but let's not tell Ottavio so as not to put him in difficulty.'" He recalled how his father hated to wear the uniform. Asked about what was Sardinia like in the 1930s, he said: "Wonderful. Fascism barely touched it. Huge and empty spaces. The Sardinians invited us to hunt wild boar. They are people of strong feelings. When we returned to Piedmont in 1940, thousands greeted us at the station." Gabetti studied at the liceo classico Domenico Alberto Azuni, where future Italian Communist Party leader Enrico Berlinguer and Italian president Francesco Cossiga also studied. At the age of 22, he graduated magna cum laude in law from the Turin University.

== Career ==
Gabetti began to work in banking within the Banca Commerciale Italiana, and in 1955 became the deputy director of the Turin branch. He held this position for ten years, after which he started working in business. He joined Olivetti, where he said he met people of such a high and unique depth, as had never happened to him before in his work contacts with other companies. During the autumn of 1971 in New York City, Gabetti met Gianni Agnelli as he was completing the restructuring of the Olivetti Corporation of America, of which he had held the reins for six years. Agnelli was impressed by Gabetti and offered him to return to Italy as general manager of IFI, the family's financial holding company. Gabetti accepted and a year later he was managing director, a position that launched the long partnership with Fiat S.p.A., of which he would also be vice-chairman from November 1993 to June 1999. From 2003 to 2008, he was chairman of IFIL, and subsequently honorary president. His expertise in the financial and industrial fields, as well as his ethical and social commitment, which was aimed at improving the country's living and working conditions, made it possible for him to be appointed Knight of the Order of Merit for Labour in 1982.

Along with Enrico Cuccia, Gabetti concluded the December 1976 agreement that led the Libyan Arab Foreign Investment (Lafico) to subscribe to a capital increase in Fiat. In September 1986, he repurchased through IFIL the 90-million Fiat ordinary shares from Lafico, with an outlay of about $1 billion, bringing the group's stake in Fiat ordinary capital to just under 40%. In the mid-1990s, Gabetti left Italy to devote himself to international investments through Exor, formerly Ifint, based in Geneva. After he retired for having reached the age limit, he returned to Turin in 1999 to help the now ill Agnelli, and dealt with the logistics relating to the treatments to be carried out in the country and abroad. Following the death of Agnelli and the appointment of his younger brother, Umberto Agnelli, as the new chairman of Fiat, Gabetti dealt with the subsequent reorganization of the automotive group, which took place in 2003, and the related capital increase involving GA, IFI, IFIL, and Fiat.

In 2004, Gabetti became the backbone of the Agnelli family, occupying the role of chairman of the family companies. When it was proposed to him to become chairman of Fiat, he stepped aside and proposed the name of Luca Cordero di Montezemolo, while on the same day John Elkann, the older Agnelli's grandson, convinced Sergio Marchionne to become CEO of the Fiat group. Gabetti was also behind the joining of Marchionne, with whom he would start a close friendship. Nicknamed Agnelli's Richelieu, he was described as the man of the international and financial relations of the Lingotto and the Agnellis, as being always discreet and reserved, and a lover of music and art.

In 2007, after the deaths of the Agnelli brothers, Gabetti worked along with Franzo Grande Stevens to ensure the succession of power to Elkann. He described Elkann as "a solid guy ... I realize he's quite exceptional, there aren't many thirty-year-olds like him." While specifying that this succession is not and must not be of a hereditary nature, he says that, in regards to the creation of the ruling class, "with us the family structure thinks less and less of educating. The children are often brought up by babysitters, the families do not take care of the school. Instead they have to believe it, participate, choose teachers, tamp them down, make sure they really teach. Because from a deficient school come deficient students. Not a new ruling class ... the young offspring have the defect of being rich even when they are young. They have more temptations, too much money in their pocket, they are often spoiled by being father's sons." In April 2009, about the alliance between Fiat and Chrysler, he said: "We must always be confident in good things, even if not everything depends on us."

Over the years, Gabetti held the roles of chairman of Giovanni Agnelli Sapaz, which later became Giovanni Agnelli B.V., director of Exor, director of the Giovanni Agnelli Foundation, director of Banca del Piemonte, chairman of Lingotto Musica, member of the executive committee for relations between Italy and the United States, member of the life trustee of the Museum of Modern Art in New York, board member of Deutsche Bank, and councilor of the Centro Studi Piemontesi. He continued to play important roles in the culture of Turin. On 14 May 2019, Gabetti died in Milan, where he was hospitalized, at the age of 94, and he was buried in the Murazzano cemetery. After his death, Elkann told La Stampa: "In one of the most difficult moments we have gone through in our recent history, he stood by our side without ever giving in to difficulties, assuming difficult responsibilities with a sense of duty, which allowed us to overcome a dark period. Despite the difficulties Gianluigi has never lost his unique style, made of courage, humanity, and irony. Like my grandfather, I was lucky enough to share many years of work and friendship with him: for what he did, but also for how he did it, I will always remember him with affection and gratitude." A private funeral, to which Elkann, Domenico Siniscalco, and other business and political figures participated, was held on 16 May 2019.

== Juventus F.C. ==
As Gianni Agnelli's trusted advisor, Gabetti was involved in Agnelli's love for the association football club Juventus, which he led to become the most renowned Italian football club. By the time Agnelli died, Juventus had won all six major UEFA competitions, reached four UEFA Champions League finals from 1995 to 2003 and consecutively from 1995 to 1998, was voted the seventh best of the FIFA Club of the Century in 2000, and in 2009 was named the second best club of the 20th century; by the early 2000s, the club had the third best revenue in Europe at over €200 million. This changed in 2006, when Calciopoli controversially hit the club, which was demoted to Serie B for the first time in its history despite the club being acquitted and the leagues were ruled to be regular in the Calciopoli trials. In the words of Fulvio Bianchi, Agnelli's Juventus were "stronger than all those that came after, and had €250 million in revenue, being at the top of Europe, and 100 sponsors. It took ten years to recover and return to the top Italians, not yet Europeans: now the club makes over €300 million, but in the meantime Real, Bayern, and the others have taken off." Gabetti brought in Giovanni Cobolli Gigli to rebuild the club.

Several observers allege that Calciopoli and its aftermath were a dispute within Juventus and between the club's owners that came after the deaths of the Agnelli brothers, including Gabetti and Franzo Grande Stevens who favoured Elkann as chairman, and wanted to get rid of Luciano Moggi, Antonio Giraudo, and Roberto Bettega, whose shares in the club increased. Whatever their intentions, it is argued they condemned Juventus: first when Carlo Zaccone, the club's lawyer, agreed for relegation to Serie B and point-deduction, when he made that statement because Juventus were the only club risking more than one-division relegation (Serie C), and he meant for Juventus (the sole club to be ultimately demoted) to have equal treatment with the other clubs; and then when Luca Cordero di Montezemolo retired the club's appeal to the Regional Administrative Court of Lazio, which could have cleared the club's name and avoid relegation, after FIFA threatened to suspend the FIGC from international play, a renounce for which then-FIFA president Sepp Blatter was thankful. Agnelli was known to have said he would have wanted every of his men to be defended to the last degree of judgement. In 2010, Gabetti supported Andrea Agnelli's bid to chair Juventus. Soon after, he was no longer involved with the club.

== Personal life ==
In March 1961, Gabetti married Bettina Sichel (1929–2008), an American who was already the mother of a daughter, Ann Tuteur, from a previous marriage. Two children were born from their marriage: Alessandro, married to Diomira Mazzolini, daughter of the RAI journalist Salvo Mazzolini; and Cristina, a television journalist who worked for Mediaset on the satirical news program Striscia la Notizia and married to the sailor Paolo Martinoni.

== Legal issues ==
In 2007, after the death of Gianni Agnelli, Margherita Agnelli sued Gabetti and two other Agnelli's advisors over his will.

In 2009, Gabetti, along with the then IFIL managing director Virgilio Marrone, was involved in the allegations against Franzo Grande Stevens of market manipulation in the equity swap of IFI–IFIL that became Exor. The equity swap of IFI–IFIL and Exor allowed the Agnelli heirs to maintain control of Fiat. On 21 December 2010, along with Grande Stevens and Marrone, Gabetti was acquitted of the charge of information rigging (Italian: aggiotaggio informativo), or microcap stock fraud. On 17 December 2013, Italy's Supreme Court of Cassation annulled the conviction of the appeal process, which sentenced him to one year and four months, without a remand to a new court due to the statute of limitations.

== Works ==
- Gabetti, Gianluigi (1979). A New Economic Democracy. Washington, D.C.: Aspen Institute for Humanistic Studies. ISBN 978-0-8984-3013-4 – via Google Books.
