= Ginevra Elkann =

Italian film director (born 1979)

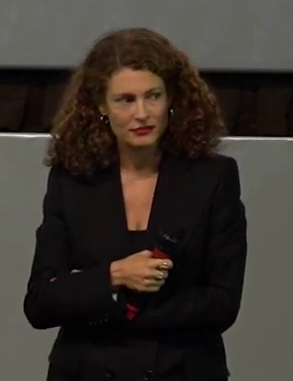
- Elkann at 2019 Torino Film Festival
- Born: 24 September 1979 (age 46); London, United Kingdom
- Occupations: Film producer Director
- Family: Elkann family Agnelli family

Ginevra Elkann (born 24 September 1979) is an Italian film producer and director, heiress and socialite. She is a member of the Elkann family and Agnelli family and granddaughter of Italian industrialist Gianni Agnelli.

== Early life ==
Elkann was born in London, on 24 September 1979, the daughter of the Italian Margherita Agnelli and the French-Italian writer Alain Elkann. Her father is Jewish and her mother is Catholic, and she was raised Catholic. Her maternal grandparents were princess and socialite Marella Agnelli and the industrialist Gianni Agnelli. She is the great-grandniece of Ettore Ovazza. She has two older brothers, John Elkann, who is chairman of the Fiat group of companies, and Lapo Elkann. Her parents divorced when she was young, and she moved first to Rio de Janeiro and then to Paris with her mother and stepfather, the Russian count Serge de Pahlen. She graduated from the American University of Paris.

== Career ==
Elkann worked as third assistant director on Bernardo Bertolucci's 1998 film L'assedio, and was video assistant on Anthony Minghella's The Talented Mr. Ripley (1999). She later studied filmmaking at the London Film School (LFS), where she achieved her master's degree. In 2005, her LFS graduation film, the nine-minute Vado a messa (I Am Going to Mass), was screened during a Cinema Schools special event at the 62nd Venice International Film Festival. Asked whether she had any particular subjects in mind for a feature-length film, she mentioned two: a thriller set in the world of synchronized swimming, and an adaptation of her father's story Piazza Carignano, which concerns a fascist Jew. It is inspired by the story of her father's side of the family, the influential Ovazza banking family, who were early allies and important financial patrons of Benito Mussolini and Italian fascism.

In 2009, Elkann founded production company Caspian Films, first producing Frontier Blues, her debut feature film by Iranian director and fellow LFS graduate Babak Jalali. This film was developed with support from the Cinéfondation of Cannes and premiered in competition at the 62nd Locarno Film Festival. She then produced other independent feature films such as White Shadow, directed by Noaz Deshe (2013), which won the Lion of the Future award at the 70th Venice International Film Festival; Chlorine, directed by Lamberto Sanfelice (2015), which premiered at the 2015 Sundance Film Festival; and again with Jalali on his third feature Land, which premiered in the Panorama section at the 68th Berlin International Film Festival.

In 2011, Elkann founded the production and distribution company Good Films, together with Francesco Melzi d'Eril, Luigi Musini, and Lorenzo Mieli. In 2019, her debut feature film as a director Magari (If Only) had its world premiere as the opening film at the 72nd Locarno Film Festival. Due to the COVID-19 pandemic in Italy, theatrical distribution of the film could not go ahead as programmed, so the film was made available on RaiPlay, the streaming platform of Italian national broadcaster RAI in May 2020. It was nominated for the best first film in 2020 and best new director in 2021 to the Ciak d'oro.

== Personal life ==
Elkann married Count Giovanni Gaetani dell'Aquila d'Aragona (b. 1973) in a Catholic ceremony in Marrakesh, Morocco, on 25 April 2009. She has two sons and a daughter with her husband: Giacomo (b. 15 August 2009), Pietro (b. 31 October 2012), and Marella (b. 27 May 2014).

== Filmography ==
=== Director ===
- Vado a messa (2005) – short film
- If Only (2019)
- I Told You So (Te l’avevo detto) - 2023

=== Producer ===
- Frontier Blues (2009), directed by Babak Jalali
- Noche (2013) directed by Leonardo Brzezicki
- White Shadow (2013), directed by Noaz Deshe
- Chlorine (2015), directed by Lamberto Sanfelic
- Arianna (2015), directed by Carlo Lavagna
- Prova contraria (2016), directed by Chiara Agnello – documentary
- Mektoub, My Love: Canto Uno (2017), directed by Abdellatif Kechiche
- Land (2018), directed by Babak Jalali

== Ancestry ==
Ancestors of Ginevra Elkann

8. Armand Elkann
4. Jean-Paul Elkann
9. Berthe Bloch
2. Alain Elkann
20. Ernesto Ovazza
10. Vittorio Ovazza
21. Celeste Malvano
5. Carla Ovazza
11. Olga Fubini
1. Ginevra Elkann
24. Giovanni Agnelli
12. Edoardo Agnelli
25. Clara Boselli
6. Giovanni Agnelli
26. Carlo Bourbon del Monte, 4th Prince of San Faustino
13. Donna Virginia Bourbon del Monte
27. Jane Allen Campbell
3. Margherita Agnelli
28. Nicola Caracciolo, 8th Prince of Castagneto, 2nd Duke of Melito
14. Filippo Caracciolo, 9th Prince of Castagneto, 3rd Duke of Melito
29. Meralda Mele Barese
7. Donna Marella Caracciolo di Castagneto
30. Charles Corning Clarke
15. Margaret Clarke
31. Alice Chandler
