= Gianni Agnelli =

Italian businessman (1921–2003)

Senator for life Gianni Agnelli OMRI OML OMCA CGVM CMG
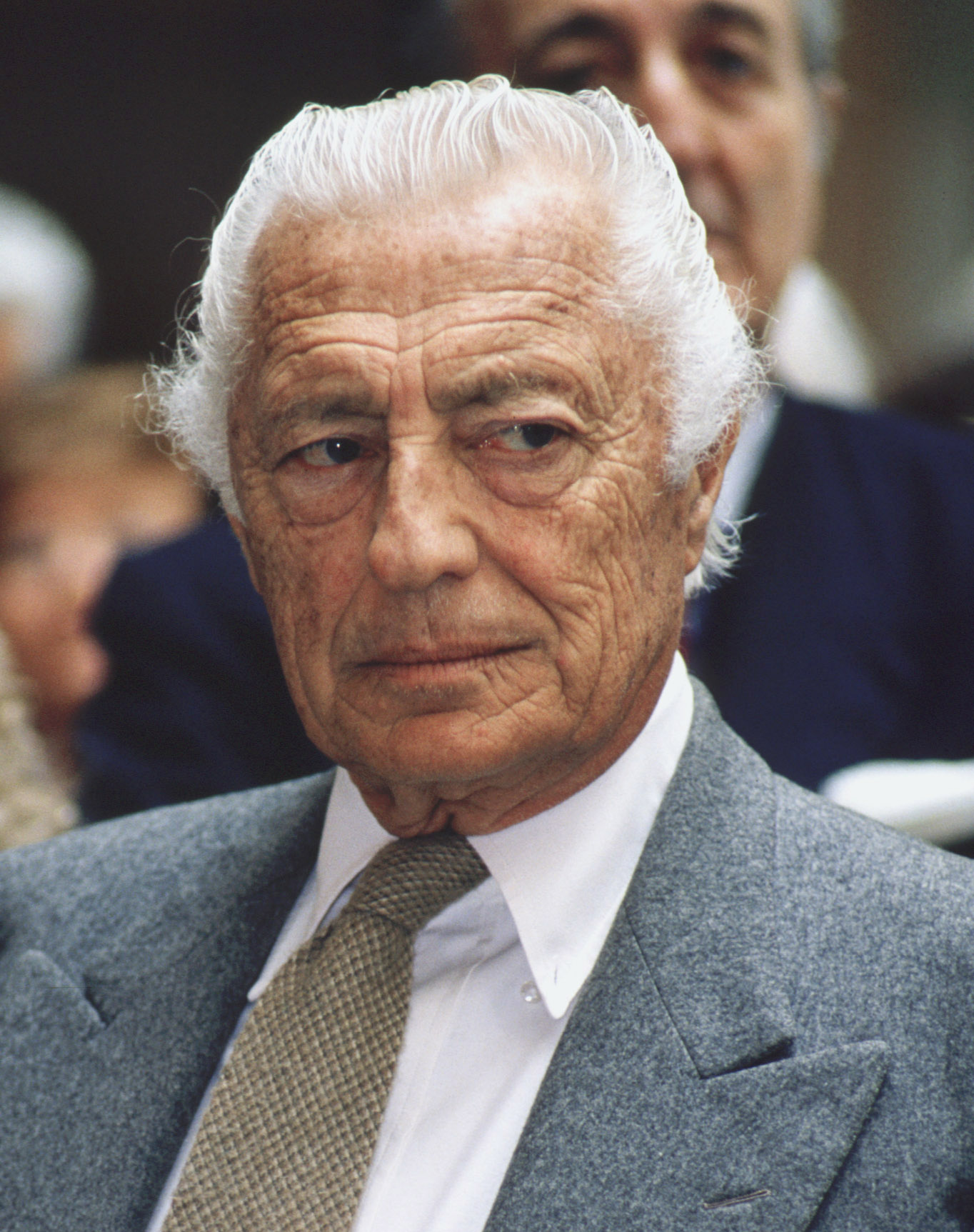
- Gianni Agnelli in 1986

Member of the Senate of the Republic
- Life tenure 1 June 1991 – 24 January 2003
- Appointed by: Francesco Cossiga

President of Confindustria
- In office 30 May 1974 – 23 July 1976
- Preceded by: Renato Lombardi
- Succeeded by: Guido Carli

Mayor of Villar Perosa
- In office 6 May 1945 – 16 June 1980
- Preceded by: Office established
- Succeeded by: Alberto Castagna

Personal details
- Born: Giovanni Agnelli; 12 March 1921 Turin, Piedmont, Kingdom of Italy
- Died: 24 January 2003 (aged 81) Turin, Piedmont, Italy
- Resting place: Villar Perosa, Piedmont, Italy
- Party: Independent
- Spouse: Princess Marella Caracciolo di Castagneto (m. 1953)
- Children: Edoardo Agnelli III; Countess Margherita Agnelli de Pahlen
- Parent(s): Edoardo Agnelli II (father); Princess Virginia Bourbon del Monte (mother)
- Relatives: Giovanni Agnelli (grandfather); John Elkann (grandson)
- Education: University of Turin
- Occupation: Industrialist

Giovanni "Gianni" Agnelli (Italian: [ˈdʒanni aɲˈɲɛlli]; 12 March 1921 – 24 January 2003), nicknamed L'Avvocato ('The Lawyer'), was an Italian industrialist and principal shareholder of Fiat. As the head of Fiat, he controlled 4.4% of Italy's GDP, 3.1% of its industrial workforce, and 16.5% of its industrial investment in research. He was the richest man in modern Italian history.

Agnelli was regarded as having an impeccable and slightly eccentric fashion sense, which has influenced both Italian and international men's fashion. Agnelli was awarded the decoration Knight Grand Cross of the Order of Merit of the Italian Republic in 1967 and the Order of Merit for Labour (Cavaliere del lavoro) in 1977. Following his death in 2003, control of the firm was gradually passed to his grandson and chosen heir, John Elkann.

== Early life ==
Agnelli was born in Turin; he maintained strong ties with the village of Villar Perosa, near Turin in the Piedmont region, of which he served as mayor until 1980. His father was the prominent Italian industrialist Edoardo Agnelli. His maternal grandmother was American; his mother was Princess Virginia Bourbon del Monte, daughter of Carlo, 4th Prince of San Faustino, head of a noble family established in Perugia, who was married with the American heiress Jane Allen Campbell. Agnelli was named after his grandfather Giovanni Agnelli, the founder of the Italian car manufacturer Fiat. At the age of 14, his father was killed in a plane crash, and he was raised by his grandfather, who died on 16 December 1945, fifteen days after Agnelli's mother, Virginia, died in a car crash.

Known as Gianni to differentiate from his grandfather, with whom he shared his first name, he inherited the command of Fiat and the Agnelli family assets in general in 1966, following a period in which Fiat was temporarily ruled by Vittorio Valletta while he was learning how his family's company worked. Agnelli raised Fiat to become the most important company in Italy, and one of the major car-builders of Europe, amid the Italian economic miracle. He was considered the king of Italian business from the 1960s to the 1980s. He also developed an accessory business, with minor companies, such as Fiat Velivoli, operating in the military industry.

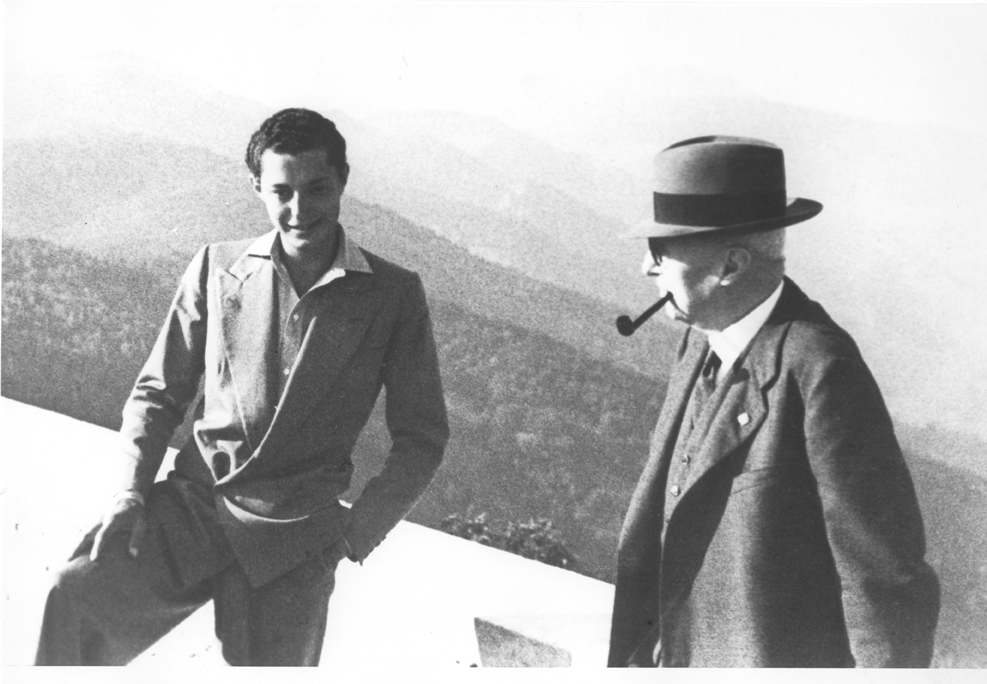
Agnelli (left) with his grandfather and Fiat founder, Giovanni Agnelli, in 1940

Agnelli was educated at Pinerolo Cavalry Academy, and studied law at the University of Turin, although he never practised law. He joined a tank regiment in June 1940 when Italy entered World War II on the side of the Axis powers. He fought on the Eastern Front, being wounded twice. He also served in a Fiat-built armoured-car division during the North African campaign, for which he received the War Cross of Military Valor. After the armistice of Cassibile, Agnelli became a liaison officer with the occupying American troops due to his fluency in English. His grandfather, who had manufactured vehicles for the Axis powers during the war, was forced to retire from Fiat but named Valletta to be his successor. His grandfather died, leaving him head of the family, but Valletta running the company. After the pre-war Topolino, Italy's first inexpensive mass-produced car, Fiat in the mid-fifties made a bestseller with the Fiat 600.

Prior to his marriage on 19 November 1953 to Marella Caracciolo dei Principi di Castagneto, a half-American, half-Neapolitan noblewoman who made a small but significant name as a fabric designer and a bigger name as a tastemaker, Agnelli was a noted playboy whose mistresses included actresses, such Anita Ekberg, Rita Hayworth, Linda Christian, Danielle Darrieux, the socialite Pamela Harriman, and Jackie Kennedy. Although Agnelli continued to be involved with other women during his marriage, including Ekberg and the fashion designer Jackie Rogers, the Agnellis remained married until his death of prostate cancer in 2003 at the age of 81.

For most of his life, Agnelli was considered to be a man of exquisite taste. In 2002, he left his paintings to the city of Turin, which established the Pinacoteca Giovanni e Marella Agnelli. His only son, Edoardo Agnelli, was born in New York City on 9 June 1954, seven months after the couple's wedding at the Château d'Osthoffen in France. He gave up trying to groom him to take over Fiat, seeing how the boy was more interested in mysticism than making cars; his son studied religion at Princeton University and took part in a world day of prayer in Assisi. His son, who seemed burdened by the mantle of his surname, committed suicide on 15 November 2000 by jumping off a bridge near Turin; Agnelli joined police at the scene. The Agnellis had one daughter, Countess Margherita Agnelli de Pahlen. She is the mother of John Elkann, Lapo Elkann, and Ginevra Elkann. She has five other children from her second marriage to Count Serge de Pahlen: Maria de Pahlen, Peter de Pahlen, Anna de Pahlen, and Tatiana de Pahlen. Into the 2020s, the de Pahlens remain involved in a dispute with the Elkanns over Agnelli's inheritance.

== Head of Fiat ==
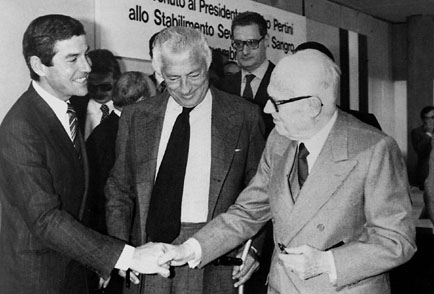
Agnelli (in the centre) and the Fiat board of directors meet then president Sandro Pertini (at his left) during an official visit to the new Sevel Val di Sangro factory in 1981

Agnelli became president of Fiat in 1966. He opened factories in many places, including the Soviet Union in the Russian city of Tolyatti, Spain, and South America, such as Automóveis in Brasil; he also started international alliances and joint-ventures like Iveco, which marked a new industrial mentality. During the international energy crisis of the 1970s, he sold part of the company to Lafico, a Libyan company owned by Muammar Gaddafi; Agnelli would later repurchase these shares. He was also closely connected with Juventus, the most renowned Italian football club, of which he was a fan and the direct owner.

In 1969 and 1970, Fiat was joined by Ferrari and Lancia. In the 1970s, which were marked by labour tensions, Fiat expanded to the east and agreements with Poland, Turkey, and Yugoslavia were strengthened. In 1974, he was elected president of Confindustria and came to terms with the labour unions by signing the agreement for the single point of contingency with the CGIL by Luciano Lama. The 1980s saw increased sales for Fiat under Vittorio Ghidella, with successes such as the Fiat Uno, the Fiat Croma, and the Lancia Thema. In 1986, after a failed agreement with Ford Motor Company, Agnelli bought Alfa Romeo from the Italian state. In the 1990s, as Fiat was unable to make inroads into the non-European automotive markets, Agnelli decided to form an alliance with General Motors. The agreement provided for General Motors to sell 5% of its shares in exchange for 20% of the Fiat Group's package, with the possibility after two years and within the next eight years to buy the remaining 80% of Fiat if it was sold.

In 1991, Agnelli was named an Italian senator for life and joined the independent parliamentary group; he was later named a member of the Senate of the Republic's defence commission. In 1997, he briefly acquired de facto control of Telecom Italia. In the early 2000s, Agnelli made overtures to General Motors, resulting in an agreement under which General Motors progressively became involved in Fiat. The crisis of Fiat came when Agnelli was already fighting against cancer, and he could take little part in these events. Agnelli also encountered a number of difficulties with Mediobanca through Cesare Romiti, who caused Agnelli anxiety. Mediobanca made a policy of constantly supervising Fiat because of its financial interests in the company, often becoming significantly involved in executive decisions and important issues. Vincenzo Maranghi, who later became the CEO of the bank, eventually developed a close friendship with Agnelli, despite previous tensions. At the time of his death in 2003, Fiat was worth €3.3 billion; Agnelli's inheritance was twenty-five times bigger by 2023.

Nicknamed L'Avvocato ("The Lawyer") because he had a degree in law even though he was never admitted to the Order of Lawyers, Agnelli was the most important figure in Italian economy, the symbol of capitalism throughout the second half of 20th century, and regarded by many as the true "King of Italy". A cultivated man of keen intelligence and a peculiar sense of humour, he was perhaps the most famous Italian abroad, particularly in the United States and New York, forming deep relationships with international bankers and politicians, largely through the Bilderberg Group, whose conferences he attended regularly since 1958. Some of the other Bilderberg regulars became close friends, among them Henry Kissinger. He was also close to John F. Kennedy, and was a friend of Truman Capote. Another longtime associate was David Rockefeller, who appointed him to the International Advisory Committee of Chase Manhattan Bank, of which Rockefeller was chairman; Agnelli sat on this committee for thirty years. He was also a member of a syndicate with Rockefeller that for a time in the 1980s owned Rockefeller Center. He was also an honorary member of the International Olympic Committee, a position he held until his death, and was named in 2000 the committee honorary president for Torino 2006, of which he was an instrumental promoter.

== Later life and death ==
Agnelli stepped down in 1996 but stayed on as Fiat's honorary chairman until his death. Giovanni Alberto Agnelli, the son of Gianni's younger brother, Umberto Agnelli, died of a rare form of cancer in 1997 at age 33 while he was being groomed by his uncle to head the Fiat Group. John Elkann, the son of Gianni and Marella's daughter, Margherita, was expected to take over Fiat after Gianni's death. Instead, Umberto became chairman, taking over from Paolo Fresco. While Fresco had diversified the Fiat Group's holdings, Umberto refocused its activities on its auto and mechanics division. He then brought in Giuseppe Morchio to mastermind a rescue strategy for the company. Morchio was expected to continue to run the Fiat Group as it attempted to claw its way out of its latest financial crisis.

Upon Umberto's death, Ferrari chairman Luca Cordero di Montezemolo was named Fiat chairman, with Elkann as vice chairman; Morchio immediately offered his resignation. His successor was Sergio Marchionne, an expert of reorganisation who between 2002 and 2004 led the Swiss certification company Societé Générale de Surveillance; Elkann played a key role when he brought Marchionne to Fiat. Agnelli died in 2003 of prostate cancer at age 81 in Turin. Fiat-owned Scuderia Ferrari named their 2003 Formula One contender, the F2003-GA, in tribute to Agnelli. Juventus and the Italian Football Federation were also in mourning over his death. In 2021, to celebrate the centenary of Agnelli's birth, a special postage stamp was issued.

== Sports ==
=== Juventus F.C. ===
==== 1940s–1990s ====
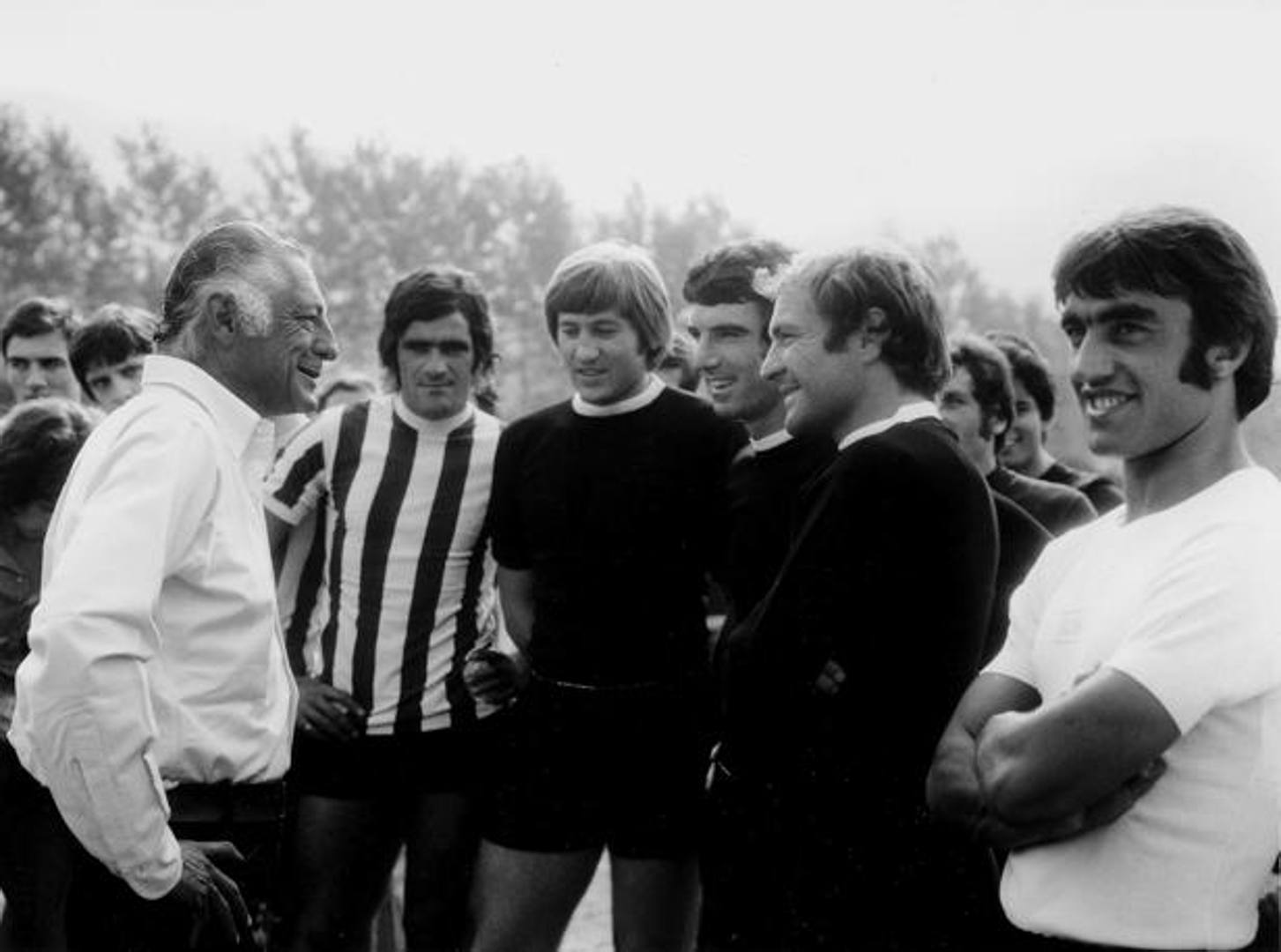
From left to right: Agnelli, investor and former chairman of Juventus, talks with some squad's footballers (Antonello Cuccureddu, Gianpietro Marchetti, Dino Zoff, José Altafini, and Pietro Anastasi) at Villar Perosa in the summer of 1972.

The figure of Agnelli was intimately linked to the history of Juventus, the association football team of Turin, of which he was appointed president from 1947 to 1954. His activity had an impact within the club similar to that of his father, Edoardo Agnelli, twenty years earlier, acquiring important players, such as Giampiero Boniperti, John Hansen, and Karl Aage Præst, who were decisive for the conquest of two Serie A leagues in 1950 and 1952, the first won by the club in fifteen years. Agnelli also had an impact on the transformation at the corporate level during his management from a private club belonging to the rival car manufacturer Cisitalia, chaired by Piero Dusio, to an independent company with private capital with limited liability that achieved further successes.

After his activity as president of the club, Agnelli remained linked to Juventus by carrying out various management activities as honorary president, with which he was able to maintain his influence on the club until 1994, the year in which he handed over these activities to his brother Umberto. Agnelli led Juventus to ten Italian football champion titles, four Italy Cups, one Intercontinental Cup, one European Cup, one Cup Winners' Cup, three UEFA Cups, and one UEFA Super Cup, for a total of 23 official trophies in 48 years, which made him one of the most important personalities in sports history. He daily called at 6 am Boniperti, such as when he convinced him to become Juventus chairman in 1971, and Juventus players to see how they were doing.

Agnelli liked footballers like Stanley Matthews and Garrincha, as well as Pelé, Diego Armando Maradona, Johan Cruijff, and Alfredo Di Stéfano, whom his club tried to sign. In 1958, Agnelli sought to purchase Pelé through Fiat's shares. In a dinner in 1962, Santos F.C. was offered one million for Pelé by Umberto. In 1962, he sent Boniperti to Chile to sign Pelé with an offer of one hundred million, which the Brazilian Football Federation did not authorise for the transfer. He was instrumental in signing Michel Platini, of whom he said: "We bought him for a piece of bread and he's put foie gras on top of it." He gave several notable nicknames to footballers, such Zbigniew Boniek (bello di notte, or "Beauty at night", which is a play on the title of Luis Buñuel's movie Belle de Jour), Roberto Baggio (Raffaello, after an Italian Renaissance painter, best known as Raphael), and Alessandro Del Piero (Pinturicchio, after the nickname of another Italian Renaissance painter, Bernardino di Betto), and Ahead of the 1996 UEFA Champions League final won by Juventus against Ajax, he said: "If they are a team of Flemish painters, we will be tough Piedmontese." His grandson, John Elkann, as well as his nephew, Andrea Agnelli, followed his footsteps at Juventus.

==== 1990s–2000s ====
In 1999, Juventus improved their own record of having won all five major UEFA competitions by winning the Intertoto Cup, the next year was voted the seventh best of the FIFA Club of the Century and in 2009 was placed by the International Federation of Football History & Statistics second in the European best club of the 20th-century ranking, the highest position for an Italian club in both; by the early 2000s, the club had the third best revenue in Europe at over €200 million. This all changed when, three years after his death, Calciopoli controversially hit the club, which was demoted to Serie B for the first time in its history despite the club being acquitted and the leagues were ruled to be regular; it was his nephew, Andrea Agnelli, who built the club back up in the 2010s. When Agnelli died in 2003, Juventus had won the 2001–02 Serie A at the last matchday, and a few months after his death had reached the 2003 UEFA Champions League final, the club's four UEFA Champions League final in seven years, three of which were achieved consecutively; those in 1997, against Borussia Dortmund, and in 1998, against Real Madrid, were lost out controversially. In the words of Fulvio Bianchi, early 2000s Juventus were "stronger than all those that came after, and had €250 million in revenue, being at the top of Europe, and 100 sponsors. It took ten years to recover and return to the top Italians, not yet Europeans: now the club makes over €300 million, but in the meantime Real, Bayern, and the others have taken off."

Some observers allege that Calciopoli and its aftermath were a dispute within Juventus and between the club's owners that came after the deaths of Gianni and Umberto Agnelli, including Franzo Grande Stevens, who was nicknamed by Agnelli "the lawyer's lawyer", and Gianluigi Gabetti who favoured Agnelli's grandson, John Elkann, over his nephew as chairman, and wanted to get rid of Luciano Moggi, Antonio Giraudo, and Roberto Bettega, whose shares in the club increased. Whatever their intentions, it is argued they condemned Juventus: first when Carlo Zaccone, the club's lawyer, agreed for relegation to Serie B and point-deduction, when he made that statement because Juventus were the only club risking more than one-division relegation (Serie C), and he meant for Juventus (the sole club to be ultimately demoted) to have equal treatment with the other clubs; and then when Luca Cordero di Montezemolo retired the club's appeal to the Regional Administrative Court of Lazio, which could have cleared the club's name and avoid relegation, after FIFA threatened to suspend the FIGC from international play, a renounce for which then-FIFA president Sepp Blatter was thankful.

Several observers, including former FIGC president Franco Carraro, argue that had Agnelli been alive, things would have been done differently, as the club and its directors would have been defended properly, which could have avoided relegation and cleared the club's name much earlier than the Calciopoli trials of the 2010s. When Tangentopoli hit the country in the 1990s, Agnelli said: "My men must be defended to the last degree of judgement." Moggi, one of the two Juventus directors involved in the scandal, was nicknamed by Agnelli as "the king's groom, who must know all horse thieves". Moggi discussed how "Agnelli said that because during my time it was full of sons of bitches. And he wanted an expert, one who could stand up to these here. For me it's a compliment." He added that Calciopoli only happened because "l'Avvocato Agnelli and il Dottor Umberto died", and had the two Agnellis not died, "nothing [of this farce] would have happened." According to observers, Juventus was weak after Agnelli's death, with Moggi saying: "The death of l'Avvocato Agnelli made us orphans and weak, it was easy to attack Juve and destroy them by making things up." According to critics, Juventus bothered because they won too much under Agnelli. Then-CONI president Gianni Petrucci said "a team that wins too much is harmful to their sport".

=== Ferrari ===
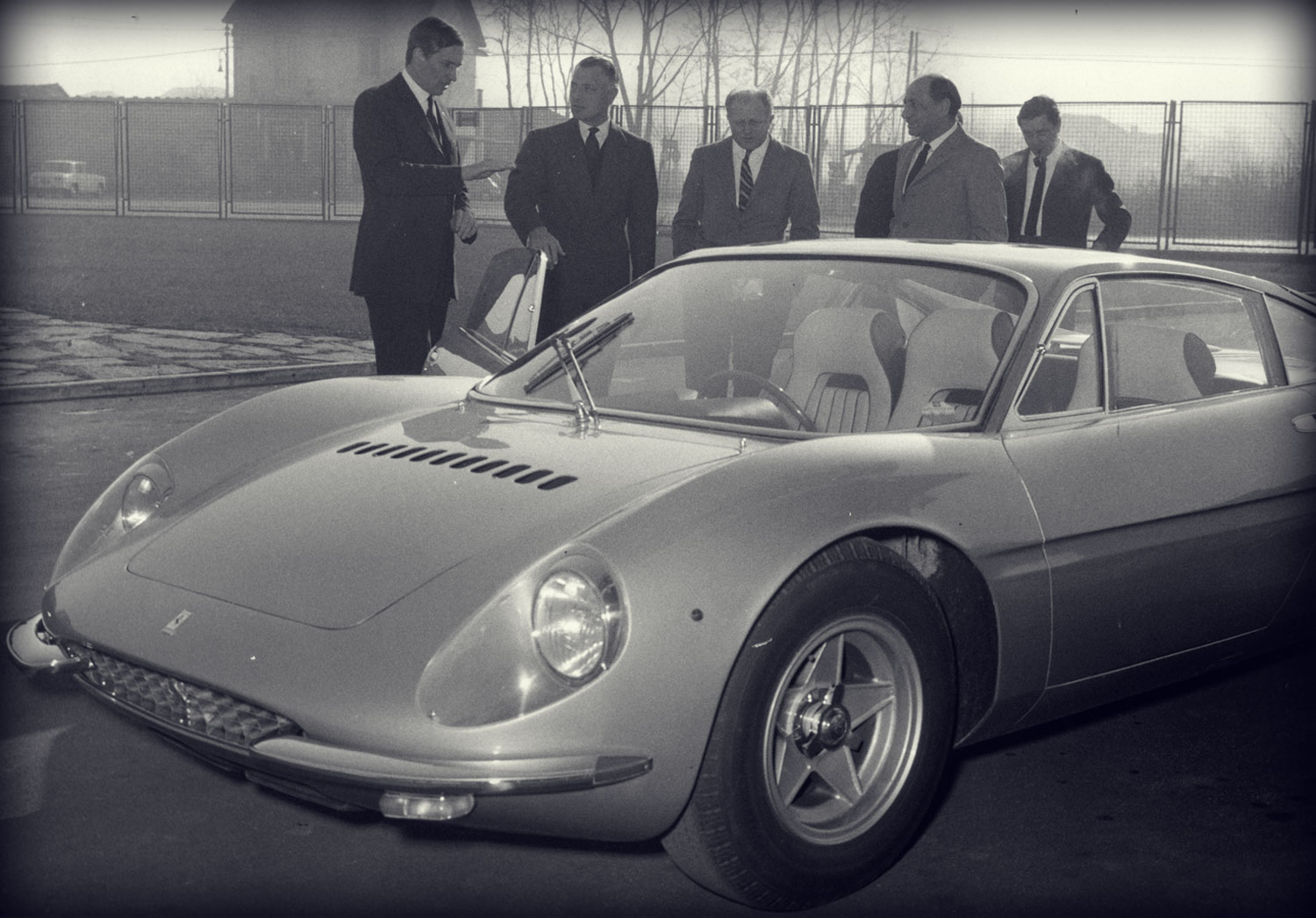
Agnelli takes delivery of his Ferrari 365 P Berlinetta Speciale. It was the second of only two built by Pininfarina and Ferrari.

Upon Fiat's acquisition of Ferrari in 1969, Agnelli became associated with Formula One and Scuderia Ferrari, which achieved successes in the 1970s with Niki Lauda and Jody Scheckter. About his passion for Ferrari, he said: "Not all Italians support the national team, while all Italians and fifty per cent of non-Italians support Ferrari." In 1996, upon the signing of Michael Schumacher, he said: "Of course, if now they don't win with Schumacher it's their fault..." In 1998, two years before Ferrari's return to dominance of the early 2000s with Schumacher, he said: "I wouldn't give up a Juve Scudetto for a Ferrari world championship." Upon his death in 2003, asked whether Agnelli loved more Juventus or Ferrari, Boniperti recalled: "I think Juve. And he loved Turin very much, the city that has always been in his heart." About Schumacher, he was quoted as saying that "this German is very dear to me, in the sense that he costs me dearly, but he is worth it."

In an interview with Oggi, Agnelli's grandson Lapo Elkann said: "He saved the Prancing Horse, preventing it from being sold to the Americans. Then he chose the right people: [former Ferrari chairman] Luca di Montezemolo and Jean Todt. He loved Ferrari cars and he loved all the beautiful things in life. It's not enough to be rich to appreciate beauty. Taste cannot be bought." About Agnelli's favoured Formula One drivers, Elkann said: "His favourite driver was the one who won. I think that's why he loved Michael Schumacher. Then he liked Gilles Villeneuve, his way of driving. And Ayrton Senna, who, had he not died so tragically, would have come to Ferrari the following year. He loved talent and courage and also recognised them in his opponents. He was a true sportsman."

=== Yacht racing ===
Agnelli helped finance and promote Azzurra, the first Italian yacht to enter the America's Cup. At sea, he frequently used his 1967 yacht G-Cinquanta, one of several vessels he owned.

== Style ==
Agnelli's fashion sense and style inspired and influenced menswear throughout the years in Italy and around the world. In his retirement speech, Milanese fashion designer Nino Cerruti named Agnelli as one of his biggest inspirations along with James Bond and John F. Kennedy. Esquire named Agnelli as one of five best-dressed men in the history of the world.

Agnelli's dress style featured a foundation of classic suits. He had a large number of bespoke Caraceni suits, which were of high quality and classic design. He was known for wearing his wristwatch over his cuff and was regarded as conveying sprezzatura, the Italian art of making the difficult look easy. Agnelli's nickname "The Rake of the Riviera" inspired the classical menswear magazine The Rake.

== Politics ==
Politically, Agnelli did not join any party and remained an independent politician; nonetheless, he was close to the Italian Republican Party (PRI), and was described as the Republican monarch of the 20th century. He had amicable relations with the Italian Democratic Socialist Party (PSDI) and Italian Socialist Party (PSI) leaders Giuseppe Saragat and Sandro Pertini, respectively, as well as with Francesco Cossiga of Christian Democracy (DC) and Carlo Azeglio Ciampi. Despite their political differences and conflicts like the Marcia dei quarantamila in 1980, he also had relatively amicable relations with the Italian Communist Party (PCI), particularly during the leadership of Enrico Berlinguer; in 2013, Giorgio Napolitano, former PCI member and then president of Italy, described it as "sincere cordiality and sympathy". Several notable PCI leaders, such as Palmiro Togliatti, Luciano Lama, and Berlinguer, and allegedly Antonio Gramsci, were supporters of Agnelli's Juventus.

Like other family members, such as his grandfather, Agnelli sought to create a non-ideological, centrist political formation of Atlanticist and pro-European persuasion that sought a modernising, internationalist capitalism in contrast to the left and opposed to the populist, nationalist, or fascist right. He received his first public assignment in 1961 when, on the occasion of the celebrations for the first centenary of the unification of Italy, he was appointed president of the Expo 61. In the 1970s, there were talks of forming a secular bloc between the Italian Liberal Party, PSDI, and PRI, and take over the place of the DC. Ahead of the 1976 Italian general election, then PRI secretary Ugo La Malfa offered Agnelli a candidacy on the party lists; in turn, Agnelli signaled his willingness to be the Ambassador of Italy to the United States. The DC was ultimately able to not only have Agnelli retire his PRI candidacy, which could have cost them about one million votes, by raising the prospect of economic retaliations for Fiat but also convinced Umberto Agnelli, his younger brother, to join the DC. He turned down the invite by then president Oscar Luigi Scalfaro to become Prime Minister of Italy after Ciampi.

In 1991, Agnelli was appointed senator for life by Cossiga, then president of the Italian Republic. He joined the For the Autonomies group and was admitted to the Defence Commission of the Senate. In 1994, he was among the three life senators (together with Giovanni Leone and Cossiga) to vote their confidence in the Berlusconi I Cabinet; it was the first time in the history of Italy that life senators were decisive for the confidence in an executive. When Berlusconi was about to enter politics, he said: "If he wins, an entrepreneur will have won. If he loses, Berlusconi will have lost." When the Prodi I Cabinet fell in 1998 and Massimo D'Alema was appointed Prime Minister of Italy and became the first post-Communist to hold the office of a NATO country, as well as Italy's only post-Communist prime minister, his vote in favour of confidence caused a sensation. He told the press that "today in Italy a left-wing government is the only one that can make right-wing policies."

== Quotations ==
Agnelli is the author of many aphorisms and quotations. The most notable of them are related to what he described as "the love of a lifetime", Juventus, about which he said "they are my life's companion, above all an emotion. It happens when I see those shirts enter the field. I even get excited when I read the letter J in some headline in the newspaper. Immediately I think of Juve." He also said: "Juve is for me the love of a lifetime, a source of joy and pride, but also of disappointment and frustration, however strong emotions, as can give a true and infinite love story."

To the shouted cheering, in response to the question "Will Juventus win or the best team win?", Agnelli replied with irony: "I'm lucky, often the two things coincide". He described Juventus thusly: "[Because] Juventus, after a century of history already, has become a legend. A legend that started off in a high school in Turin and finished up by gaining nine or ten million fans in Italy and, of course, the same number abroad with a jersey and colours that are known throughout the world." About Tommaso Buscetta, a member of Cosa Nostra who became a pentito and collaborator of justice, he was quoted as saying: "He said he was obsessively a fan of Juventus? If you meet him, tell him it's the only thing he won't have to regret [a play on the word pentito, which comes from pentire, meaning in English 'to regret']."

== Honours ==
- Knight Grand Cross of the Order of Merit of the Italian Republic, 27 December 1967.
- Knight of the Order of Merit for Labour, 1977.
- Italian Medal of Merit for Culture and Art, June 1987.
- War Cross of Military Valor, 13 February 1943.
- Great War Commemorative Medal.
- War Merit Cross.
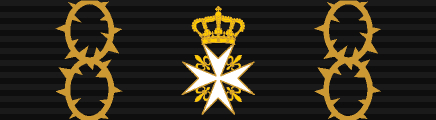
- Grand Cross of the Sovereign Military Order of Malta.

Business positions
Preceded by Renato Lombardi	President of Confindustria; 1974–1976	Succeeded by Guido Carli
