= Alain Elkann =

Italian novelist (born 1950)

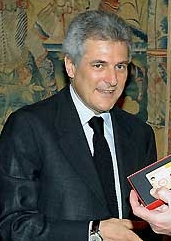
- Elkann in 2008
- Born: 23 March 1950 (age 76); New York City, U.S.
- Occupation: Novelist
- Spouses: Margherita Agnelli (m. 1975; div. 1981); Rosy Greco (m. 2002; div. 2009)
- Children: John Elkann; Lapo Elkann; Ginevra Elkann
- Parent: Jean-Paul Elkann
- Relatives: Agnelli family; Ettore Ovazza
- Writing career
- Period: 1990–2000
- Genres: Fiction; History; Sociology

Alain Elkann (born 23 March 1950) is an Italian novelist and journalist. Elkann is the host of cultural programs on Italian television. He is president of the Scientific Committee of the Italy–USA Foundation. A recurring theme in his books is the history of the Jews in Italy, their centrality to Italian history, and the relation between the Jewish faith and other religions. He is a writer for La Règle du Jeu, Nuovi Argomenti, A, and Shalom magazines.

== Early life and family ==
A member of the wealthy and influential Elkann family, he was born in New York City; the family returned to Italy soon after his birth. His Italian Jewish mother, Carla Ovazza, is from the influential Turinese Ovazza banking family; on 26 November 1975, she was a victim of kidnapping in Turin. His great-uncle, Ettore Ovazza, had been an early financial supporter of Benito Mussolini, whom he was a personal friend of, and Italian fascism, which he supported until the Italian racial laws of 1938. Ettore Ovazza was also the founder of an anti-Zionist journal, La nostra bandiera. He was murdered in 1943 by the Nazis, along with the rest of his family, whose bodies were burned in a school boiler in Intra, Italy. His father, Jean-Paul Elkann, was a French Jewish industrialist, the chairman of Dior and the president of the Israelite Central Consistory of France, responsible for appointing the Chief Rabbis of France, from 1982 to 1992.

== Career ==
Elkann was a collaborator of important Italian writers, such as Alberto Moravia and Indro Montanelli. He wrote novels, essays, and articles, among which are a book he co-wrote with Italian Chief Rabbi Elio Toaff, a former religious leader in Rome, called How to Be a Jew and Other Works and a book of conversation with him called The Messiah and the Jews (Il Messia e gli ebrei). He also published a book with Milan archbishop Carlo Maria Martini, as well as a book about Islam with Prince El Hassan bin Talal of Jordan. In 2010, Elkann argued that all Jews should develop a strong connection to Israel.

Since 2007, Elkann has been the president of Fondazione CittàItalia, and is also president of the Alliance française of Turin, president of Mecenate 90 (Rome), president of the scientific committee of Palazzo Te (Mantua), president of the FIAC of New York (Italian Foundation for Art and Culture), vice-president of the Fondazione Rosselli, board member of the IULM University of Milan where he teaches literature and arts, board member of the Museo Mega (Gallarate), member of the jury of Premio Internazionale Mondello Palermo and of Premio Roma, and image consultant for the municipality of Milan. For five years, he was counselor to the culture minister Giuliano Urbani. From 2004 to 2012, he was the president of the Egyptian Museum of Turin; he was replaced by Evelina Christillin.

On 16 May 2008, Elkann was appointed by the Italian government Adviser for Cultural Events and Foreign Relations to the Italian Minister Sandro Bondi. He received the America Award of the Italy-USA Foundation in 2010. He was awarded the Chevalier de la Légion d'Honneur in July 2009, and he received the Medaille de Vermeil award from the Académie Française in November 2010. A journalist since 1992 and member of Lazio's Order of Journalists, he works at La Stampa, the daily newspaper of Turin, teaches at the University of Pennsylvania, and appears on La7.

== Personal life ==
In 1975, Elkann married Margherita Agnelli, daughter of the then president of Fiat Gianni Agnelli, with whom he had three children; two (Lapo Elkann and John Elkann) were involved in their grandfather's company, with Lapo now in fashion, while his daughter (Ginevra Elkann) is in the movie industry. His children were baptized and raised Catholic. After divorcing his wife in 1981, Elkann remarried with Rosy Greco in 2002; she was also Catholic. They divorced in 2009. In addition to his American citizenship, he has French and Italian citizenship.

== Ancestry ==
Ancestors of Alain Elkann

4. Armand Elkann
2. Jean-Paul Elkann
5. Berthe Bloch
1. Alain Elkann
24. Raffael Ovazza
12. Ernesto Ovazza
25. Allegra Levi
6. Vittorio Ovazza
13. Celeste Malvano
3. Carla Ovazza
7. Olga Fubini

== Institutional roles ==
- President of the Scientific Committee of the Italy-USA Foundation
- President of Amici dei Giardini, Giardini Botanici Hanbury (La Mortola, Ventimiglia, Imperia)
- Member of the Board of Scientific Committee of the Museum of Italian Judaism and the Shoah
- Member of the Board of the Italian Academy at Columbia University of New York City
- President of FIAC Foundation of New York (Foundation for Italian Art and Culture)

== Works ==
- Il tuffo (1981)
- Stella Oceanis (1983)
- Piazza Carignano (1985) (in English, 1986)
- Le due babe (short story collection, 1986)
- Montagne russe (1988) – Misguided Lives (in English, 1989)
- Vita di Moravia (with Alberto Moravia, 1990, new ed. 2000) – Life of Moravia (in English, 2001)
- Rotocalco (novel, 1991)
- Delitto a Capri (novel, 1992)
- Vendita all'asta (short stories, 1993)
- Cambiare il cuore (with Carlo Maria Martini, 1993, new revised ed. 1997)
- Essere ebreo (with Elio Toaff, 1994, new ed. 2001)
- Emma, intervista a una bambina di undici anni (1995)
- I soldi devono restare in famiglia (1996)
- Diario verosimile (1997)
- Il padre francese (1999) – The French Father (in English, 2011)
- Le mura di Gerusalemme (2000)
- Interviste 1989-2000 (2000)
- John Star (2001)
- Essere musulmano (with B. Hassan, 2001) – To Be a Muslim: Islam, Peace, and Democracy (in English, 2003)
- Il Messia e gli ebrei (2002)
- Boulevard de Sébastopol e altri racconti (2002)
- Una lunga estate (2003)
- Mitzvà (2004)
- Giorno dopo Giorno (2005)
- L'Equivoco (2008) – L'imprevue (in French, 2010)
- Envy (in English, 2008)
- Nonna Carla (2010)
- Hotel Locarno (2011)

== Honours and awards ==
- Knight of the Legion of Honour, 4 December 2009.
- Commander of the Order of Merit of the Italian Republic, 30 December 2020.
- Cesare Pavese Prize, 2002.
- America Award of the Italy-USA Foundation, 2010.
- Bellezze d'Italia Award, 2011
- Pannuzzio Prize, 2016
