= Fondazione CittàItalia =

Italian heritage preservation foundation

- Formation: 30 June 2003
- Type: NGO
- Purpose: Heritage conservation
- Headquarters: Via del Babuino 186, Rome
- Region served: Italy
- Official language: Italian
- President: Alain Elkann
- Main organ: Board of Directors
- Parent organization: Mecenate 90 Association
- Website: www.fondazionecittaitalia.it

The Foundation for the cultural heritage of Italian Cities (CittàItalia Foundation) is an Italian non-profit organization whose aims are: to raise public awareness to save Italian heritage and to support art. The foundation was set up on 30 June 2003 by the Mecenate 90 Association, a number of art cities and banking foundations.
