= Jean-Paul Elkann =

French banker (1921–1996)

- Born: 28 December 1921; Paris, France
- Died: 23 November 1996 (aged 74); Paris, France
- Education: Lycée Janson de Sailly; Columbia Business School
- Known for: Director of Christian Dior SA
- Spouses: Carla Ovazza; Francoise Schuhl (m. 1953)
- Children: 2 including Alain Elkann
- Relatives: Agnelli family; Ettore Ovazza

Jean-Paul Elkann (28 December 1921 – 23 November 1996) was a French banker. He was president of Compagnie Financière Jean-Paul Elkann (CFJPE).

== Biography ==
=== Early life and education ===
Born in Paris, Jean-Paul Elkann was the son of Montbéliard-born industrialist Armand Elkann (1882–1962) and his wife Berthe Bloch. He was raised at Lycée Janson de Sailly in Paris. He was admitted to study at Polytechnique in 1940 but left France with his family.

=== Refugee in New York ===
Elkann continued his studies in the United States and received a Bachelor of Science degree from Columbia Business School in 1943 while living at The Pierre hotel in New York City.

Along with his father, Elkann entered the metallurgical industry. Soon after, he became the owner and president of the companies Vanadium Steel Italiana from 1948, Vanadium Alloys Steel Canada (since 1950), and Vice President of Vanadium Alloys Steel USA from 1953.

=== Return to Paris ===
In 1953, Elkann returned to France and went into the fragrance industry. In 1962, he became president of Parfums Caron. Thereafter, he became vice president of Parfums Givenchy (1980–1983), director of Christian Dior SA Group, and director of several major French companies. He was also the president of the Consistoire israélite de Paris from 1967 to 1982, then chairman of the Israelite Central Consistory of France from 1982 to 1992, and interim president of the Conseil Représentatif des Institutions Juives de France (CRIF) in late 1982, replacing Alain de Rothschild, who died of a heart attack in October 1982.

Although he was himself a non-practicing Jew, he supported the Orthodox movement. As quoted by the Chief Rabbi, Michel Gugenheim, Elkann told the leader of Reform Judaism in the United States, Alexander Schindler: "The only difference between you and me, Mr. rabbi, is that I violate the law, but I do not change it, and you want to change the law." He was also the vice president of the France-Israel Chamber of Commerce, the chairman of the Association de coopération économique France-Israël, Haifa Technion governor, administrator of Yabné school, administrator of the Alliance Israelite Universelle, and vice chairman of the Social Action Committee Israelite de Paris (CASIP).

In addition to his business career, Elkann served on the board of overseers of Columbia Business School.

== Personal life and death ==
Elkann married Carla Ovazza (1922–2000), heir to a Jewish banking family in Turin, whom he met at Columbia University; she was the niece of Ettore Ovazza. They had a son, Alain Elkann, who was born in New York in 1950 and who, in 1975, married Margherita Agnelli, daughter of the influential Italian industrialist and principal shareholder of Fiat, Gianni Agnelli.

After divorce, Jean-Paul Elkann married Francoise Schuhl on 9 November 1953, with whom he had a daughter, Brigitte Elkann. He died on 23 November 1996, in Paris.

== Honours ==
- Commandeur de la Légion d'honneur, 1988
- National Order of Merit (France), 1996
