= Château d'Osthoffen =

Château in Osthoffen, France

Coordinates: 48°35′03″N 7°33′12″E

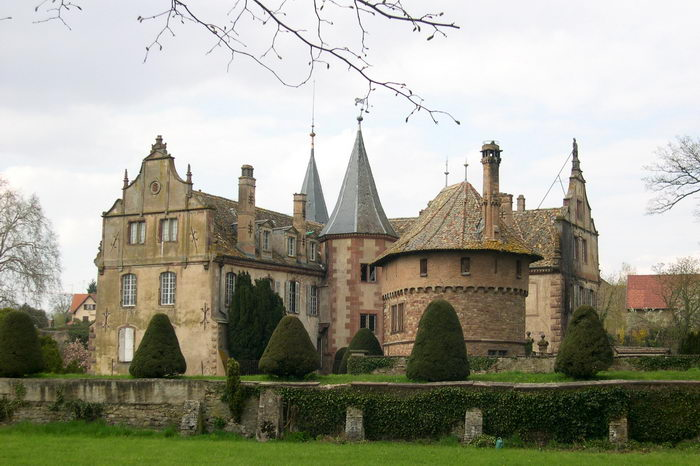

The Château d'Osthoffen is a château developed from an older castle situated in the commune of Osthoffen in the département of Bas-Rhin of France, located about 15 kilometres from Strasbourg. It is dated to the 12th or 13th century.

It has been listed since 1963 as a monument historique by the French Ministry of Culture.

== See also ==
- List of castles in France
