= Franzo Grande Stevens =

Italian lawyer (1928–2025)

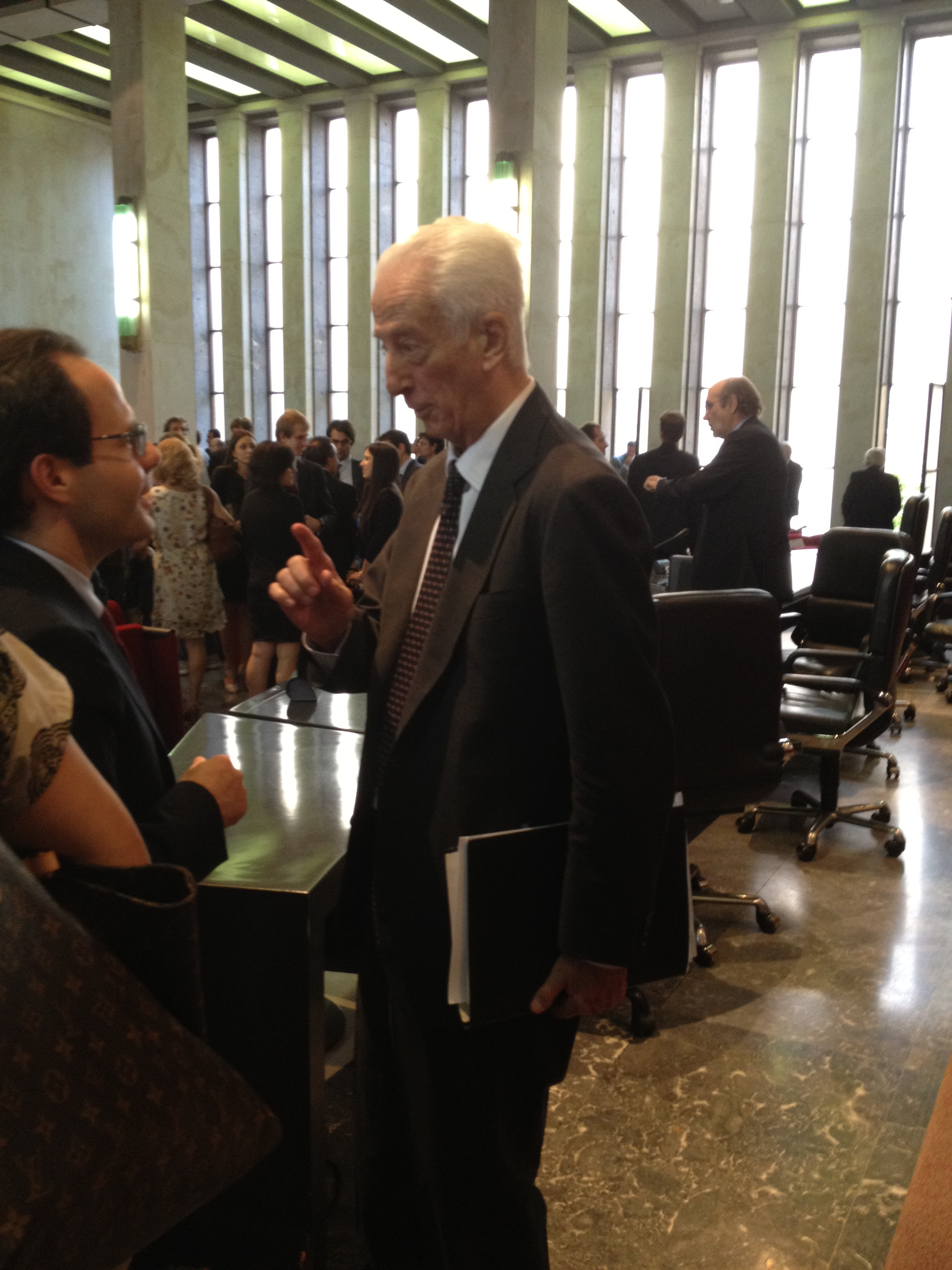
- Stevens in 2012
- Born: 13 September 1928; Naples, Kingdom of Italy
- Died: 13 June 2025 (aged 96); Turin, Italy

Franzo Grande Stevens (13 September 1928 – 13 June 2025) was an Italian lawyer. He was famous for being the lawyer of the Agnelli family, and was one of the triad of longtime advisors of Gianni Agnelli. He continued to advise Agnelli's grandson and heir John Elkann. He served as chairman of Juventus from 2003 to 2006, when the club was relegated due to Calciopoli.

== Early life ==
Born in Naples on 13 September 1928, he was the grandson of tycoon Franzo Grande. Of Anglo-Sicilian-Neapolitan origin, one branch of the family is from Avola, while the other is English, the source of the second part of his surname. Grande Stevens lived his adolescence in Naples, where he obtained his liceo classico diploma and jurisprudence degree at the Federico II University, where he was a pupil of Alessandro Galante Garrone. Having exhausted the experience of the apprenticeship alongside the lawyer Francesco Barra Caracciolo di Basciano, he moved to Turin, where he became a consultant of Gianni Agnelli, the president of Fiat. He held positions in several large Italian companies, such as Toro Assicurazioni, and was also the president of the Order of the Italian Lawyers and the vice-chairman of Fiat.

== Career ==
Enrolled in the Register of Lawyers (Italian: Albo degli avvocati) since 1954, Grande Stevens became one of Agnelli's trusted persons; he was vice-chairman of Fiat, the company owned by Agnelli. Like Vittorio Caissotti di Chiusano before him, he was nicknamed "the lawyer's lawyer". In 1976, he participated as a public defender in the trial of the historical leaders of the Red Brigades, together with the president of the council of the Turin bar association, Fulvio Croce, who was later assassinated by the Red Brigades. He wrote Vita d'un avvocato, published by Cedam in 2000, more than twenty years after the murder of Croce, about the affair.

Over time, Grande Stevens followed the corporate events of the most important industrial groups in the country, often holding managerial positions within them. He was chairman (Italian: presidente) of Toro Assicurazioni, CIGA hotels, the National Forensic Fund, and from 1985 to 1991 also of the National Forensic Council. He held the presidency of the Compagnia di San Paolo and sat on the boards of directors of IFIL Investments and RCS MediaGroup. Among his clients were the likes of Carlo De Benedetti, Luigi Giribaldi, Aga Khan IV and Adriana Volpe, and companies like Ferrero, Pininfarina and Lavazza.

=== Juventus ===
In August 2003, Grande Stevens succeeded Caissotti di Chiusano, who had died on 31 July 2003, as chairman of the board of directors of Juventus, the Agnelli family-owned association football club in Turin. Grande Stevens held the position until he was replaced by Giovanni Cobolli Gigli, amid the Calciopoli scandal, in 2006; he was made honorary chairman (Italian: presidente onorario) of the club including former Juventus player Giampiero Boniperti. As of the 2022–23 season, he remained one of the club's honorary chairmen.

His role in the aftermath of Calciopoli is questioned. The scandal itself remains a much-debated topic due to the one-side focus on Juventus and its harsh, unprecedented punishment. Some observers allege that Calciopoli and its aftermath were also a dispute within Juventus and between the club's owners, (Note: About the behavior of Juventus executives at the time and their lack of defance, 1980 Totonero chief investigator Corrado De Biase stated: "I can't know why the Juventus owners has moved in a certain way, but I would say, 99%, that the affair was skilfully managed by the leaders of the Turin club, starting with the request from Zaccone, who left everyone stunned. Zaccone isn't incompetent, as many believe, but he was only an actor in this story." De Biase further said: "The point that makes me think that Zaccone acted on input from the owners is another, namely the way in which the top management of Juventus moved, with that fake appeal to the TAR. How, I wonder, you dismiss the executives, practically pleading guilty, then you watch inert and impassive a media and judicial destruction against your club and then you're threatening to resort to the TAR? It's the concept of closing the barn when the oxen have fled, if you think about it.") including Grande Stevens and Gianluigi Gabetti who favoured John Elkann over Andrea Agnelli as chairman, and wanted to get rid of Luciano Moggi, Antonio Giraudo, and Roberto Bettega, whose shares in the club increased. Whatever their intentions, it is argued they condemned Juventus, firstly when Carlo Zaccone, the club's lawyer, agreed for relegation to Serie B and point-deduction, (Note: In later years, Zaccone clarified he made that statement because Juventus were the only club risking more than one-division relegation (Serie C), and he meant for Juventus to have equal treatment with the other clubs; in the end, Juventus were the sole club to be relegated to Serie B.) and secondly when Luca Cordero di Montezemolo retired the club's appeal to the Regional Administrative Court (TAR) of Lazio, (Note: About the club's renounce to the TAR appeal, De Biase said: "First you let yourself be massacred without lifting a finger, you have the title disassigned, you have the calendars drawn up for the European championships and cups, and then you threaten to go to the TAR, trumpeting everything in the newspapers? It looks much like a political move to appease the wrath of the fans, I think. If Zaccone, who is a man of value and experience, would have had the mandate to avoid the disaster he would have moved in a different way, in the sense that he would have pointed out these 'anomalies' in the time between the trial and the announcement of the verdicts. That, in fact, was the right moment to threaten to appeal to the TAR, when the sentences had not yet been written, but had to be done in camera caritatis, asking for a meeting with Ruperto, Sandulli, and Palazzi, and not in front of the journalists of La Gazzetta dello Sport." De Biase concluded: "Please note that I'm not discussing the high strategy of the forensic art, but the basic principles, the ABC of the profession, the things that are taught to the boys who come to the studio to do a traineeship: if you, the defence attorney, think you have weapons to play, you ask for a meeting with the judge and the public prosecution, in the period between the trial and the verdict, and point out that, if the response is judged too severe, you will use them. And here there were weapons in industrial quantities. Then, in the face of a fait accompli, who takes the responsibility of stopping a machine that grinds billions of euros, so as to be the sixth industry in the country?") which could have cleared the club's name and avoid relegation, after FIFA threatened to suspend the Italian Football Federation (FIGC) from international play; then FIFA president Sepp Blatter personally thanked Montezemolo. As a company, Juventus were acquitted in the Calciopoli trials.

=== Exor ===
In 2009, Grande Stevens was prosecuted for market manipulation in the equity swap of IFI–IFIL that is now Exor, Agnelli's holding company and Fiat's financial company. The trial, which began on 26 March 2009, saw him involved for the equity swap of IFI–IFIL and Exor that in 2005 allowed the Agnelli heirs to maintain control of Fiat; according to the prosecution, this was kept hidden for many months to the Consob and the market. According to the Turin investigating judge, Francesco Moroni, Grande Stevens had to answer for information rigging (Italian: aggiotaggio informativo), or microcap stock fraud. Also involved in the investigation were the then IFIL president Gianluigi Gabetti and managing director Virgilio Marrone; all three defendants were acquitted on 21 December 2010. On 21 February 2013, in the appeal process, Grande Stevens was sentenced to 1 year and 4 months, after Italy's Supreme Court of Cassation annulled the acquittal. On 17 December 2013, the Court of Cassation annulled the sentence without a remand to a new court due to the statute of limitations.

== Personal life ==
Married from 1954, he had a son, Riccardo Grande Stevens. In 2018, he described himself as "a Turinese from Naples", and said he could speak the Piedmontese language.

Grande Stevens was a personal friend of Sergio Marchionne, who was CEO of Fiat Chrysler Automobiles, with whom he described as having a father–son relationship. When Marchionne died in 2018, there were rumors that he had recent shoulder surgery but many had assumed that lung cancer was behind his death, including Grande Stevens, who wrote a letter in the Corriere della Sera. He said: "When I learned from London TV that he had been hospitalized in Zurich, I unfortunately thought that his life was in danger. Because I knew his inability to escape the constant smoke of cigarettes. However, when I learned it was just shoulder surgery, I hoped. Instead, as I feared, from Zurich I received confirmation that his lungs had been attacked and I understood that he was near the end."

Grande Stevens died on 13 June 2025, at the age of 96.

== Honours ==
- Knight Grand Cross of the Order of Merit of the Italian Republic, 27 January 1990.
