= Ettore Ovazza =

Italian Jewish banker (1892–1943)

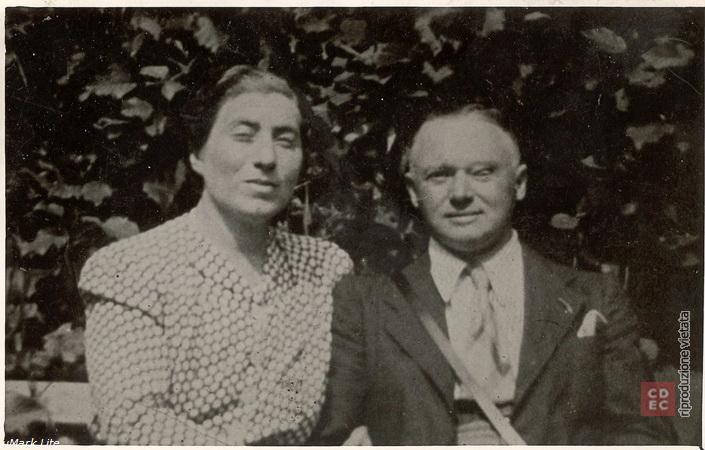
- Black and white photograph of Ettore Ovazza and his wife Nella Sacerdoti
- Born: 21 March 1892; Turin, Kingdom of Italy
- Died: 11 October 1943 (aged 51); Intra, Italian Social Republic
- Cause of death: Execution by shooting
- Occupation: Banker
- Known for: Financer and political supporter of Italian fascism
- Political party: National Fascist Party
- Relatives: Jean-Paul Elkann; Gianni Agnelli; John Elkann

Ettore Ovazza (21 March 1892 – 11 October 1943) was an Italian banker. He was an early financier of Benito Mussolini, whom he was a personal friend of, and a strong supporter of Italian fascism. He founded the anti-Zionist journal La nostra bandiera (Our Flag). Believing that his position would be restored after the war, Ovazza stayed on after the Germans occupied Italy during World War II. Together with his wife and children, shortly after the fall of Fascism and Mussolini's government, he was killed near the Swiss border by SS troops in 1943.

== Early life and family ==
One out of three sons, he was born in a wealthy and influential Jewish family of bankers, resident in Turin, Italy. His father and his brothers voluntarily enlisted to fight in World War I. While following Jewish traditions, such as celebrating Passover, the family was well integrated into Italian high society. His father served as the leader of Turin Jewish community.

== World War I ==
After graduated in Law, Ovazza moved to Germany aspiring to a diplomatic career. At the outbreak of the Great War in 1914, he volunteered and trained as an officer, only to suffer the humiliating defeat in the Battle of Caporetto. His patriotic letters from the front were published in 1928, and received general praise. After the war, the city of Turin was affected by the turmoil of the Biennio Rosso (Two Red Years) with repeated strikes, lockouts and violent demonstrations. The Ovazza family was alarmed by these developments.

== Between war years ==
Ovazza was a committed fascist from the start. He participated in the March on Rome in October 1922; in 1929, he was invited to meet Benito Mussolini as a part of a delegation of Jewish war veterans. He later described the encounter thusly: "On hearing my affirmation of the unshakeable loyalty of Italian Jews to the Fatherland, His Excellency Mussolini looks me straight in the eye and says with a voice that penetrates straight to my heart: 'I have never doubted it'. When Il Duce bids us farewell with a Roman salute, I feel an urge to embrace him, as a fascist, as an Italian, but I can't; and approaching him at his desk I say: 'Excellency, I would like to shake your hand'. It is not a fascist gesture, but it is a cry from the heart ... Such is The Man that Providence has given to Italy."

The National Fascist Party's attitudes to the Jewish population began to change when Adolf Hitler took the leadership of Germany. Although Mussolini rejected Nazi racial theories, they influenced some leading Fascists in Italy. In 1934, several Jews were arrested in Turin for anti-fascist activity, because of the spying of a Jewish writer, nicknamed "Pitigrilli", who converted to Catholicism. Ovazza reacted by doubling his efforts to side with the Fascist Italy regime. He founded the newspaper La nostra bandiera (Our Flag), to remind the Italians of the Jewish people's sacrifices in WWI. Taking a leading role in the Hebrew community in Turin, Ovazza ensured that all the key positions were held by Fascists. When Mussolini kicked off the invasion of Abyssinia and the Second Italo-Ethiopian War, he immediately volunteered for service, but he was rejected. Despite the beginnings of antisemitism, Ovazza was still being rewarded for his patriotism. In 1935, he was honoured for his contribution to Libya's colony, and the following year was named a fellow of the honour guard at the tomb shrine of the royal family at Superga.

== World War II ==
In 1938, when the Italian racial laws, a series of antisemitic laws, were approved, Ovazza's family was hit hard. Jews were no longer allowed to marry Aryan Italians, to send their children to state schools, to teach in the educational system, and to work in any capacity as state officials. Further, the new act forbade that a Hebrew could employ over 100 people, or could own valuable land or buildings. In 1939, Jews were banned from nearly all types of jobs. Jewish organizations were disbanded and many Jews converted to Catholicism or emigrated abroad. This put an end to the Ovazza business and banking operations. Ovazza was expelled from the Fascist party, and his brother from the Army.

Ovazza's two brothers left the country and advised him to do the same; he was reluctant to leave the country, hoping that Mussolini would change his mind. He wrote an anguished letter to Mussolini in which he expressed his pain. He stated: "Was it all a dream we nurtured? I can't believe it. I cannot consider changing religion, because it would be a betrayal – and we are fascists. And so? I turn to You – DUCE – so that in this period, so important for our revolution, you do not exclude that healthy Italian part from the destiny of our Nation."

== Death ==
After the surrender of Italy to the Allied forces in 1943, Ovazza moved to Valle d'Aosta, with the hope of crossing the Swiss border, but in an attempt to do so, he was captured by the SS, and murdered along with the rest of his family, except for his daughter Carla, who had found shelter in Paris, France. Their bodies were burned in a boiler, or in a wood stove, in Intra, Italy.

== Legacy ==
His grandnephew, Alain Elkann, wrote a fictionalized version of his life. His great-grandnephew is John Elkann, Alain Elkann's son.

== Works ==
- E. Ovazza, Il diritto internazionale e la conflagrazione bellica. La proprietà privata. Turin: Tipografia Baravalle e Falconieri, 1915.
- L. Perigozzo, O bionda creatura (canto e piano), text of E. Ovazza. Turin: Perosino, 1915.
- E. Ovazza, L'uomo e i fantocci. Verità in tre momenti. Milan: Modernissima, 1921.
- E. Ovazza, Ghirlande (liriche). Milano: Modernissima, 1922.
- E. Ovazza, In margine alla storia. Riflessi della guerra e del dopoguerra (1914-1924), preface by V. Buronzo. Turin: Casanova, 1925.
- L. Perigozzo, Quattro impressioni, text of E. Ovazza. Bologna: Bongiovanni, 1925.
- E. Ovazza, Diario per mio figlio. Turin: Sten, 1928.
- E. Ovazza, Lettere dal campo (1917-1919), with explanatory notes, preface by D.M. Tuninetti. Turin: Casanova, 1932.
- E. Ovazza, Politica fascista. Turin: Sten, 1933.
- E. Ovazza, Sionismo bifronte. Rome: Pinciana, 1935.
- E. Ovazza, L'Inghilterra e il mandato in Palestina, preface by A. Pozzi, Rome: Pinciana, 1936.
- E. Ovazza, Sita (poemetto indiano), woodcut by B. Bramanti. Florence: Rinascimento del Libro, 1937.
- E. Ovazza, Il problema ebraico. Risposta a Paolo Orano. Rome: Pinciana, 1938.
- E. Ovazza, Guerra senza sangue (Da Versaglia a Monaco). Rome: Pinciana, 1939.

== See also ==
- Lake Maggiore massacres

== Bibliography ==
- Raspagliesi, Roberta (30 September 2017). "Fascist Jews Between Politics and the Economy: Five Biographical Profiles". In Sarfatti, Michele (ed.). Italy's Fascist Jews: Insights on an Unusual Scenario. Milan: CDEC Foundation. doi:10.48248/issn.2037-741X/817 (inactive 6 July 2025). ISSN 2037-741X.
- Stille, Alexander (1992). Benevolence and Betrayal: Five Italian Jewish Families Under Fascism (hardcover ed.). New York: Summit Books. ISBN 978-0-2240-3301-5 – via Google Books.
- G. Valabrega, "Prima notizie su "La Nostra Bandiera'". in Id., Ebrei, fascismo, sionismo. Urbino: Argalia, 1974, pp. 41–57.
- P. Spagnolo, "Aspetti della questione ebraica nell'Italia fascista. Il gruppo de 'La Nostra Bandiera' (1935-1938)". Annali del Dipartimento di scienze storiche e sociali. V, 1986–87, pp. 127–145.
- A. Stille, Uno su mille. Cinque famiglie ebraiche durante il fascismo. Milan: Mondadori, 1991.
- L. Klinkhammer, Stragi naziste in Italia. La guerra contro i civili (1943-1944). Rome: Donzelli, 1997.
- L. Ventura, Ebrei con il duce. "La Nostra Bandiera", 1934-1938. Turin: Zamorani, 2002.
- E. Holpfer, "L'azione penale contro i crimini in Austria. Il caso di Gottfried Meir, una SS austriaca in Italia". La Rassegna Mensile di Israel, LXIX, 2003, pp. 619–634.
- G. S. Rossi, La destra e gli ebrei. Una storia italiana. Soveria Mannelli: Rubbettino, 2003.
- M. Angeletti, Ettore Ovazza (1892-1943), un ebreo ad oltranza. Gli scritti letterari di Ettore Ovazza. Trento: University of Trento, 2005.
- P. Lazzarotto, F. Presbitero, Sembra facile chiamarsi Ovazza. Storia di una famiglia ebraica nel racconto dei protagonisti. Milan: Edizioni Biografiche, 2009.
- Vincenzo Pinto, "Fedelissimi cittadini della Patria che è Madre comune. Il fascismo estetico e sentimentale di Ettore Ovazza (1892-1943)". Nuova Storia Contemporanea, XV, 5, 2011, pp. 51–72.
