= Lycée et collège Victor-Duruy =

High school in Paris, France

Coordinates: 48.8525°N 2.3150°E

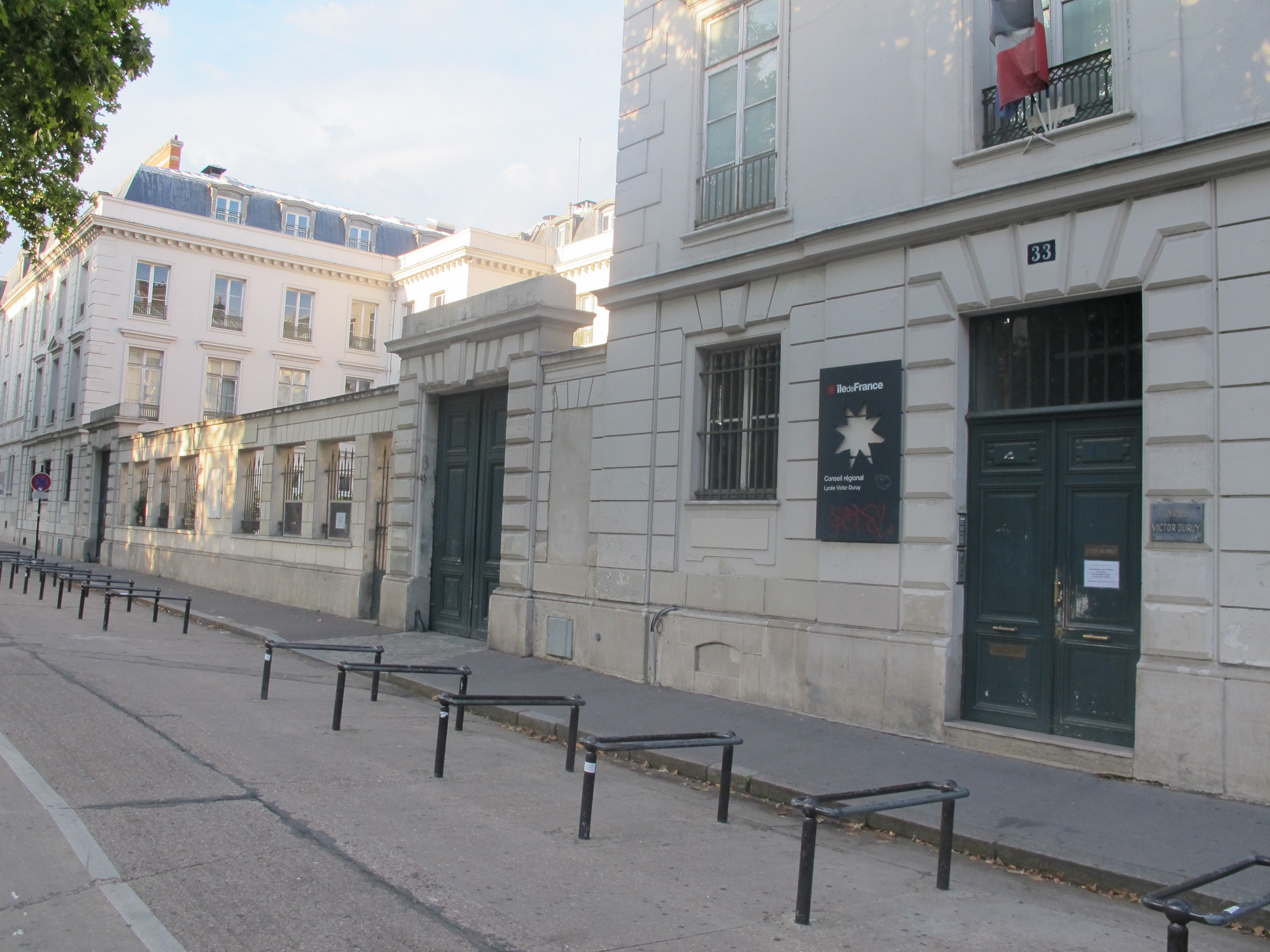
Main façade along boulevard des Invalides

Lycée et collège Victor-Duruy is a public high school and sixth-form college/junior and senior high school in the 7th arrondissement of Paris. As of 2012 most of its approximately 2,000 students live in the 7th and 15th arrondissements.

It opened on 8 October 1912 as a state sixth-form college for girls, in a former religious girls' educational institution that was later used as an artist's colony. It had primary classes until the post-World War II period. It was renovated in the 1950s, became coeducational in 1971, and received a second renovation from 1986 to 1996.
