= Order of Merit for Labour =

Italian order of knighthood

Order of Merit for Labour Ordine al Merito del Lavoro
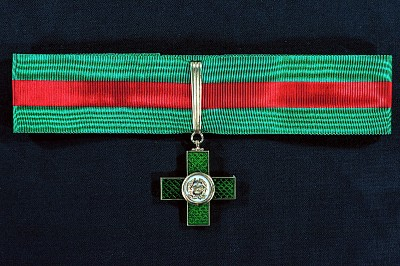
- Insignia of the order

Awarded by the Italian Republic
- Type: Order of chivalry
- Established: 9 May 1901; 125 years ago
- Country: Italy
- Eligibility: Civilians
- Criteria: those who have been singularly meritorious in agriculture, industry and commerce, crafts, lending and insurance
- Status: Currently constituted
- Founder: Vittorio Emanuele III
- Grand Master: President of the Republic
- Council Chair: Minister of Economic Development
- Grades: Knight
- Post-nominals: OML
- Website: quirinale.it/meritolavoro

Precedence
- Next (higher): Military Order of Italy
- Next (lower): Order of the Star of Italy

The Order of Merit for Labour (Italian: Ordine al Merito del Lavoro) is an Italian order of chivalry that was founded in 1923 by King Vittorio Emanuele III. It is awarded to those "who have been singularly meritorious" in agriculture, industry and commerce, crafts, lending and insurance. It is a continuation of the earlier Ordine al Merito Agrario, Industriale e Commerciale founded in 1901. Members of the order may use the title Cavaliere del lavoro.

The origins of the order lie with King Umberto I who, in 1898, instituted "a decoration for agricultural and industrial merit and a medal of honour." The first was the exclusive prerogative of large landowners and industrialists, the latter for their employees. This was replaced by the Chivalrous or Knightly Order of Agricultural, Industrial and Commercial Merit in 1901, which was intended by Vittorio Emanuele III to give greater dignity to the earlier award.

Awarded in the single degree of Knight, the order is open to all Italians, living at home and overseas. Every year, on 1 June, 25 new Knights of Labour are invested from a shortlist of 40 candidates. The related Star of Merit for Labour, established in 1923, confers the title of Maestro del Lavoro.

Ribbon	Class	Name of the Order	Title
	Knight	Ordine al Merito del Lavoro	Cavaliere del lavoro
	Master	Stella al Merito del Lavoro	Maestro del lavoro

The order is bestowed by decree of the President of the Italian Republic, its head since 1952, on the recommendation of the Minister of Economic Development (successor to the Minister of Industry, Commerce and Craftsmanship). The badge bears the inscription Al merito del lavoro—1901; the V.E. monogram formerly at the centre of the Greek cross, now substituted for the national coat of arms.

In 1977, the future four-time President of the Council of Ministers, Silvio Berlusconi, was appointed to the order by the sixth President of the Republic, Giovanni Leone. He later renounced the title after he was found guilty of tax fraud.

== See also ==
- List of Italian orders of knighthood
- Order of Merit of the Italian Republic
