= FIFA Club of the Century =

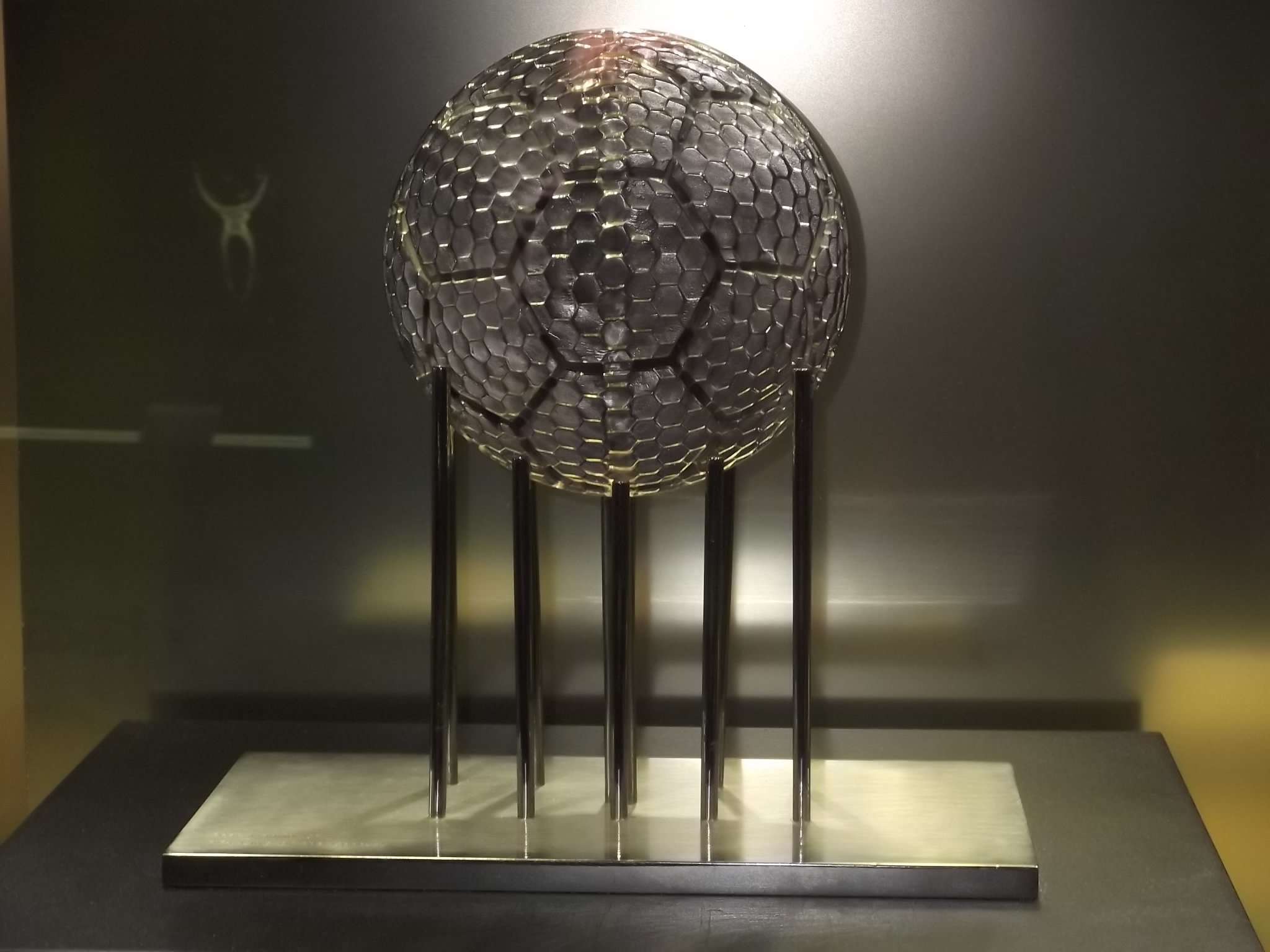
FIFA Club of the Century trophy, exhibited at the Real Madrid Museum

FIFA Club of the Century was an award presented by FIFA to decide the best football club of the 20th century. Real Madrid was the winner of the award with 42.35% of the vote, announced at the annual FIFA World gala, held in Rome on 11 December 2000. Madrid was the most successful club in international football at the time, having amassed eight European Cups, two UEFA Cups, two Latin Cups and two Intercontinental Cups.

During the ceremony, Alfredo Di Stéfano and Florentino Pérez collected the trophy which was presented to Real Madrid. For the 2006–07 season a crest was added to Real Madrid's shirts, commemorating their status as FIFA Club of the Century.

== Results ==
The voting system used for the award, was restricted to subscribers of the bi-monthly FIFA World Magazine (FIFA's official magazine).

FIFA Club of the Century rankings
| Rank | Club | Country | % |
|---|---|---|---|
| 1 | Real Madrid | Spain | 42.35% |
| 2 | Manchester United | England | 9.69% |
| 3 | Bayern Munich | Germany | 9.18% |
| 4 | Barcelona | Spain | 5.61% |
| 5 | Ajax | Netherlands | 5.10% |
| 5 | Santos | Brazil | 5.10% |
| 7 | Juventus | Italy | 2.55% |
| 8 | Peñarol | Uruguay | 2.04% |
| 9 | AC Milan | Italy | 1.53% |
| 9 | Flamengo | Brazil | 1.53% |
| 9 | River Plate | Argentina | 1.53% |
| 12 | Arsenal | England | 1.02% |
| 12 | Benfica | Portugal | 1.02% |
| 12 | Boca Juniors | Argentina | 1.02% |
| 12 | Botafogo | Brazil | 1.02% |
| 12 | Independiente | Argentina | 1.02% |
| 12 | Inter Milan | Italy | 1.02% |
| 12 | Liverpool | England | 1.02% |
| — | Other clubs | | 6.63% |
