= Brandolini (surname) =

Brandolini is an Italian surname. Notable people with the surname Brandolini include:

- Aureliano Brandolini (1927–2008), Italian agronomist and development cooperation scholar
- Aurelio Lippo Brandolini (1454?–1497), Italian humanist and political theorist
- Coco Brandolini d'Adda (born 1979), Italian fashion editor and executive
- Cristiana Brandolini d'Adda (born 1927), Italian socialite
- Bianca Brandolini d’Adda (born 1987), Italian fashion model, actress and socialite
- Fernando Brandolini (1932–1987), Italian professional racing cyclist
- Georgina Brandolini d'Adda (born 1949), French-Brazilian fashion executive
- Luca Brandolini (born 1933), Italian prelate of the Roman Catholic Church
- Marie Brandolini d'Adda (1963–2013), French-Italian glass maker
- Muriel Brandolini, French-Vietnamese interior designer
- Alberto Brandolini, data scientist and proponent of Brandolini's Law

== See also ==
- Brandolini (disambiguation), Italian surname
- Brandolini family, Italian family
