= Juiz de Fora (disambiguation) =

Juiz de Fora is a city in Minas Gerais, Brazil

Juiz de Fora may also refer to:

== Places ==
- Immediate Geographic Region of Juiz de Fora, Minas Gerais, Brazil
- Intermediate Geographic Region of Juiz de Fora, Minas Gerais, Brazil
- Roman Catholic Archdiocese of Juiz de Fora, Juiz de Fora, Minas Gerais, Brazil
- Juiz de Fora Airport, Juiz de Fora, Minas Gerais, Brazil

== Groups, organizations ==
- Federal University of Juiz de Fora, Juiz de Fora, Minas Gerais, Brazil
- School of Engineering of Juiz de Fora, Juiz de Fora, Minas Gerais, Brazil
- Jesuit College, Juiz de Fora, Juiz de Fora, Minas Gerais, Brazil
- Juiz de Fora Vôlei, a Brazilian men's volleyball team from Juiz de Fora, Minas Gerais, Brazil

== Other uses ==
- Juiz de fora (office) (Portuguese: outside judge), a magistrate appointed by the King of Portugal to serve in the municipalities where an impartial outsider was needed

== See also ==
- FORA (disambiguation)
