= Coco Brandolini d'Adda =

Italian noblewoman and fashion executive (born 1979)

- Full name: Cornelia Brandolini d'Adda dei conti di Valmareno
- Born: 27 June 1979 (age 46); Paris, France
- Spouse: Matteo Colombo (m. 2008)
- Issue: Nina Colombo; Lea Colombo; Cora Colombo
- Father: Rodrigo Tiberto Brandolini d'Adda, Count of Valmareno
- Mother: Princess Georgina de Faucigny-Lucinge et Coligny
- Occupation: fashion consultant, fashion editor, fashion director

Donna Cornelia Brandolini d'Adda dei conti di Valmareno, better known as Coco Brandolini d'Adda, (born 27 June 1979) is a French-born Italian fashion executive, editor and socialite.

== Early life and family ==
Brandolini d'Adda was born on 27 June 1979 in Paris to Rodrigo Tiberto Brandolini d'Adda, Conte di Valmareno and Princess Georgine Maria Natividad de Faucigny-Lucinge et Coligny. Her paternal grandmother was Countess Cristiana Brandolini d'Adda, the sister of Gianni Agnelli and daughter of Edoardo Agnelli and Donna Virginia Bourbon del Monte (daughter of Carlo Bourbon del Monte, Prince di San Faustino). Her maternal grandfather was the French aristocrat Prince Jean-Louis de Faucigny-Lucinge and her maternal grandmother was Sylvia Régis de Oliveira, the only daughter of Raul Régis de Oliveira, a Brazilian diplomat who served as Brazil's Ambassador to the United Kingdom from 1925 to 1939. She has a younger sister, Bianca Brandolini d'Adda. Two of her family's ancestral palaces, the Palazzo Brandolin Rota and the Palazzo Morosini Brandolin, are located on the Grand Canal in Venice. She grew up in Paris, but spent a lot of her youth at her paternal grandparents' estate in Vistorta. She went to university in Paris to study philosophy and political science.

== Career ==
Brandolini d'Adda was an intern at Harper's Bazaar before attending Central Saint Martins College of Art and Design in London. From 2001 to 2005, Brandolini d'Adda worked for Oscar de la Renta as a fashion consultant and design assistant. After working at Oscar de la Renta, she became a fashion consultant for Alberta Ferretti and Adam Lippes. She later was appointed Fashion Director at Tar Magazine and has worked as a fashion consultant for Tomas Maier at Bottega Veneta and at Nina Ricci. She later became an editor at Anew Magazine. Brandolini d'Adda worked as an artistic muse for Giambattista Valli. In 2012, Brandolini d'Adda, as head of the couture team, collaborated on Dolce & Gabbana's Alta Moda collection.

== Personal life ==
Brandolini d'Adda married Matteo Colombo in September 2008. The couple celebrated their civil ceremony with four hundred guests at the Italian Embassy in Paris. On 27 September 2008 the couple had a private religious wedding ceremony at a Catholic church in Vistorta, Italy. They have three daughters named Nina, Lea and Cora.

Brandolini d'Adda is the godmother of Margherita Missoni's son Otto Hermann Amos.

Brandolini d'Adda is noted for her personal style and is frequently photographed attending high society functions and fashion events.
