= Rubens Ricupero =

Brazilian academic, economist, bureaucrat and diplomat

Rubens Ricupero GCIH
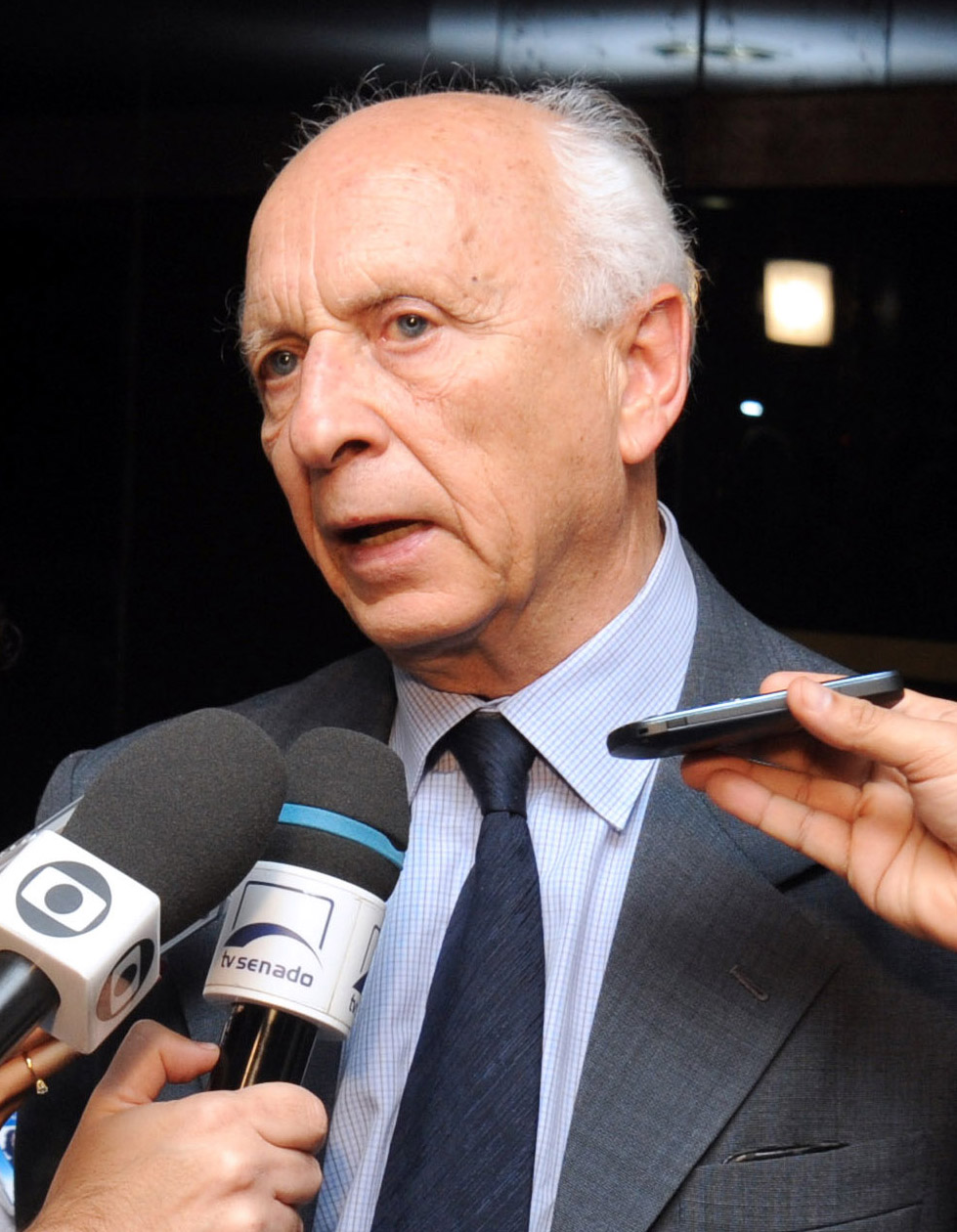
- Ricupero in 2011

Secretary-General of the United Nations Conference on Trade and Development
- In office September 15, 1995 – September 14, 2004
- Secretary-General: Boutros Boutros-Ghali; Kofi Annan
- Preceded by: Kenneth Dadzie
- Succeeded by: Supachai Panitchpakdi

Ambassador of Brazil to Italy
- In office March 19, 1995 – December 12, 1995
- Nominated by: Fernando Henrique Cardoso
- Preceded by: Orlando Carbonar
- Succeeded by: Paulo Pires do Rio

Minister of Finance
- In office April 5, 1994 – September 3, 1994
- President: Itamar Franco
- Preceded by: Fernando Henrique Cardoso
- Succeeded by: Ciro Gomes

Minister of the Environment and the Legal Amazon
- In office September 16, 1993 – April 5, 1994
- President: Itamar Franco
- Preceded by: Fernando Coutinho Jorge
- Succeeded by: Henrique Brandão Cavalcanti

Ambassador of Brazil to the United States
- In office August 25, 1991 – August 25, 1993
- Nominated by: Fernando Collor de Mello
- Preceded by: Marcílio Marques Moreira
- Succeeded by: Paulo Tarso Flecha de Lima

Personal details
- Born: March 1, 1937 (age 89) São Paulo, São Paulo, Brazil
- Spouse: Marisa Parolari
- Education: University of São Paulo School of Law
- Profession: Diplomat

Rubens Ricupero (born March 1, 1937) is a Brazilian academic, economist, bureaucrat and diplomat. He served as the fifth Secretary General of the United Nations Conference on Trade and Development from September 1995 to September 2004.

== Education ==
Ricupero earned a Bachelor in Law from the University of São Paulo in 1959. He also studied at the Rio Branco Institute, a branch of the Brazilian Ministry of Foreign Relations.

== Career ==
From 1979 to 1995, Ricupero taught courses in international relations at the University of Brasília; and in the same period, he also taught the history of Brazilian diplomatic relations at the Rio Branco Institute.

Ricupero was Chairman of the Finance Committee at the United Nations Conference on Environment and Development which was held in Rio de Janeiro in 1992. He was the Brazilian Minister of the Environment and Amazonian Affairs, before becoming Minister of Finance in 1994.

He is credited with providing continuity during the implementation of the Plano Real. This plan encompassed anti-inflationary monetary reform, the introduction of the modern Brazilian real and other measures taken to stabilize the Brazilian economy.

Diplomatic postings have included:

- Ambassador and Permanent Representative to the UN in Geneva (1987–1991)
- Ambassador to the United States of America (1991–1993)
- Ambassador to Italy (1995)
- GATT, Chairman of Council of Representatives (1989, 1991)

== Selected works ==
Ricupero's published encompass 48 works in 58 publications in 4 languages and 400 library holdings.

- 2010 — Diário de bordo: A viagem presidencial de Tancredo
- 2007 — A abertura dos portos
- 2006 — A ONU no século XXI: perspectivas
- 2004 — Beyond Conventional Wisdom in development policy: an Intellectual History of UNCTAD 1964-2004
- 2001 — O Brasil e o dilema da globalização
- 2000 — Rio Branco: o Brasil no mundo
- 1998 — O ponto ótimo da crise. Rio de Janeiro: Ed. Revan. ISBN 9788571061514; OCLC 254511468
- 1995 — Visões do Brasil : ensaios sobre a história e a inserção internacional do Brasil. Rio de Janeiro;São Paulo : Ed. Record. ISBN 9788501043368; OCLC 254090142
- 1994 — A Nova inserção internacional do Brasil
- 1994 — Estabilidade e crescimento: os desafios do real
- 1993 — NAFTA and Brazil (with Sérgio Estanislav do Amaral, Robert Charles Kelso). Coral Gables, Florida: North-South Center, University of Miami. OCLC 29661557
- 1992 — O Futuro do Brasil : a América Latina e o fim da guerra fria
- 1991 — Brasil em mudança

== Honours ==
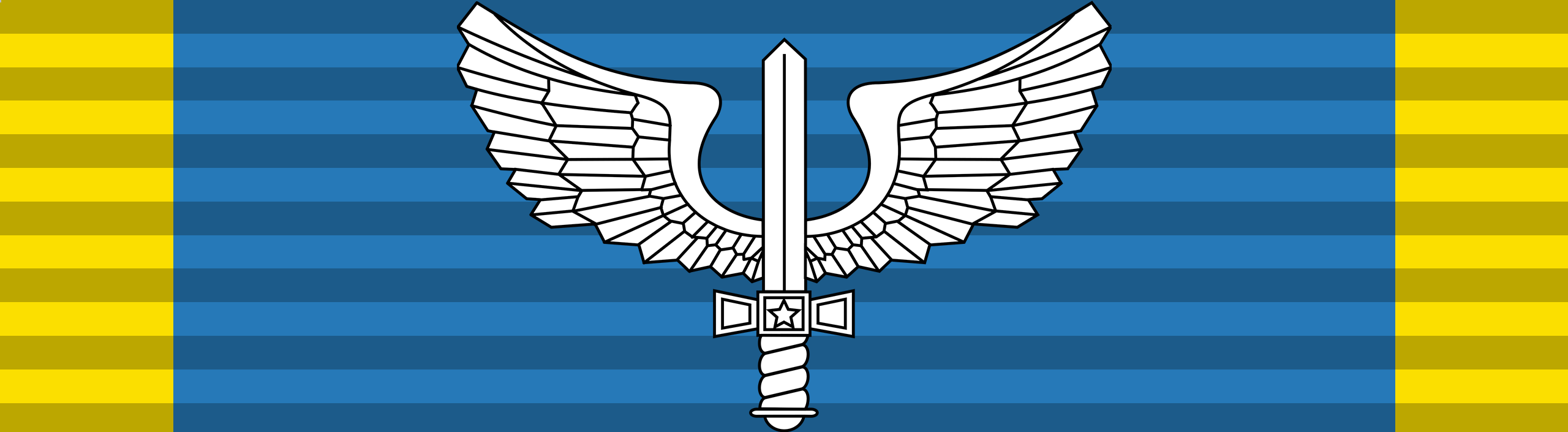
- Santos-Dumont Merit Medal (1973)
- Grand Cross of the Order of Prince Henry (1986)
- Grand Officer of the Order of Military Merit (Brazil) (1994)
- Grand Officer of the Order of the Sun of Peru (2019)

== Notes ==
Political offices
Preceded by Fernando Coutinho Jorge	Minister of the Environment and the Legal Amazon; 1993–1994	Succeeded by Henrique Brandão Cavalcanti
Preceded by Fernando Henrique Cardoso	Minister of Finances; 1994	Succeeded by Ciro Gomes
Diplomatic posts
Preceded by Marcílio Marques Moreira	Ambassador of Brazil to the United States; 1991–1993	Succeeded by Paulo Tarso Flecha de Lima
Preceded by Orlando Carbonar	Ambassador of Brazil to Italy; 1995	Succeeded by Paulo Pires do Rio
Preceded by Kenneth Dadzie	Secretary-General of the United Nations Conference on Trade and Development; 1995–2004	Succeeded by Supachai Panitchpakdi
