= Bianca Brandolini d'Adda =

21st-century Italian socialite

- Full name: Bianca Brandolini d'Adda dei conti di Valmareno
- Born: 25 June 1987 (age 39); Paris, France
- Father: Rodrigo Tiberto Brandolini d'Adda, Count of Valmareno
- Mother: Princess Georgina de Faucigny-Lucinge et Coligny
- Occupation: socialite, model, actress
- Education: Institut du Marais–Charlemagne Pollès

Donna Bianca Brandolini d'Adda dei conti di Valmareno (born 25 June 1987) is an Italian model, actress and socialite.

== Early life and family ==
Bianca Brandolini d'Adda was born in Paris, France, to an ancient Venetian aristocratic family. Her father is Rodrigo Tiberto Brandolini d'Adda, Count of Valmareno and her mother is Princess Georgina Maria Natividad de Faucigny-Lucinge et Coligny, a French-Brazilian model who worked for Valentino as an artistic muse. Through her father, she is a descendant of Empress Maria Theresa. She has an older sister, Coco Brandolini d'Adda. Two of her family's ancestral palaces, the Palazzo Brandolin Rota and the Palazzo Morosini Brandolin, are located on the Grand Canal. Her paternal grandmother was Countess Cristiana Brandolini d'Adda (née Agnelli), sister of Fiat chairman Gianni Agnelli and daughter of Edoardo Agnelli and Virginia Bourbon del Monte (daughter of Carlo Bourbon del Monte, Prince di San Faustino). Her maternal grandfather was the French aristocrat Prince Jean-Louis de Faucigny-Lucinge and her maternal grandmother was Sylvia Régis de Oliveira, the only daughter of Raul Régis de Oliveira, a Brazilian diplomat who served as Brazil's Ambassador to the United Kingdom from 1925 to 1939.

She grew up between Paris, Venice, and Rio de Janeiro and received her education at the Institut du Marais–Charlemagne Pollès. She went on to study theatre at Studio Pygmalion in Paris. In 2005, she was presented to society at le Bal des Débutantes at the Hôtel de Crillon in Paris. She was escorted by Antoine de Tavernost and wore a black and white Valentino gown. She was chosen to open the first waltz at the Crillon Ball with Prince Charles Philippe, Duke of Anjou.

== Career ==
In 2009, Brandolini d'Adda made her acting debut in the television film Aïcha, directed by Yamina Benguigui. She was a spokes-model for Dolce & Gabbana, becoming the face of their fashion brand in 2012. She co-designed a line of women's swimwear with Alexia Niedzielski for Oskar Metsavaht's fashion brand Osklen. In 2014, she collaborated with Angelo Ruggeri, director of Sergio Rossi, on a collection of women's shoes.

== Personal life ==
Brandolini d'Adda had been involved romantically with Agnelli heir Lapo Elkann, her second cousin. The couple had at one point been engaged, but later called off the relationship.
