= Paulo Tarso Flecha de Lima =

Brazilian diplomat (1933–2021)

Ambassador of Brazil to Italy
- In office June 16, 1999 – December 6, 2001
- Nominated by: Fernando Henrique Cardoso
- Preceded by: Paulo Pires do Rio
- Succeeded by: Andrea Matarazzo

Ambassador of Brazil to the United States
- In office November 12, 1993 – May 26, 1999
- Nominated by: Itamar Franco
- Preceded by: Rubens Ricupero
- Succeeded by: Rubens Antonio Barbosa

Ambassador of Brazil to the United Kingdom
- In office March 16, 1990 – November 12, 1993
- Nominated by: Fernando Collor de Mello
- Preceded by: Celso de Souza e Silva
- Succeeded by: Rubens Antônio Barbosa

Personal details
- Born: 8 July 1933 Belo Horizonte, Minas Gerais, Brazil
- Died: 12 July 2021 (aged 88) Brasília, Federal District, Brazil
- Spouse: Lúcia Flecha de Lima (m. 1963; died 2017)
- Children: 5
- Profession: Diplomat
- Awards: Knight Grand Cross of the Order of Merit of the Italian Republic

Paulo Tarso Flecha de Lima (8 July 1933 – 12 July 2021) was a Brazilian diplomat. He was the ambassador of Brazil to the United Kingdom, the United States, and Italy, and was also secretary general of the Brazilian Foreign Ministry, before retiring in 2001, after 46 years in the diplomatic service.

His wife, Lucia, was Secretary of Tourism of the Federal District but is better known for having been a close friend of Diana, Princess of Wales.

== Life ==
Born in Belo Horizonte, Flecha de Lima joined the Brazilian diplomatic service in 1955. Early in his career he was a member of the staff of President Juscelino Kubitschek. In 1971, he was appointed head of the government's Department of Trade Promotion. He spent most of his overseas career on the "Elizabeth Arden circuit", high-status capital cities such as Rome, Paris, London, and Washington, D.C. From 1985 to 1990 he was secretary general of the Foreign Ministry in Brasília.

In August 1990, Flecha de Lima was on holiday in southern France when he was commissioned to conduct negotiations on behalf of his government for the release of some five hundred Brazilians living in Iraq. Saddam Hussein had threatened to use them as human shields to prevent an attack by the United States and its allies which later became known as the Gulf War. Flecha de Lima successfully negotiated in English with Hussein Kamel al-Majid, Minister of Military Production and son in law of Saddam Hussein, and with Iraqi vice-presidents Sabri Hamadi and Taha Yassin Ramadan.

From 1990 to 1993 Flecha de Lima was Brazilian Ambassador to the United Kingdom, then from 12 November 1993 to 26 May 1999 he was Ambassador to the United States, suffering a brain haemorrhage while in post. He then went to Rome for his final overseas posting as Ambassador to Italy.

Paulo Tarso Flecha de Lima died at the age of 88 on 12 July 2021.

== Personal life ==
Flecha de Lima met his future wife, Lucia, the daughter of a professor of medicine, while she was still at school. They married in 1960 when she was eighteen and had five children, including daughters, Isabel and Beatriz (now Beatriz Nasr).

== Honours ==
- Knight Grand Cross of the Order of Merit of the Italian Republic

== Notes ==
Diplomatic posts
Preceded by Celso de Souza e Silva	Ambassador of Brazil to the United Kingdom; 1990–1993	Succeeded by Rubens Antônio Barbosa
Preceded by Rubens Ricupero	Ambassador of Brazil to the United States; 1993–1999	Succeeded by Rubens Antônio Barbosa
Preceded by Paulo Pires do Rio	Ambassador of Brazil to Italy; 1999–2001	Succeeded by Andrea Matarazzo
