= Georgina Brandolini d'Adda =

French-Brazilian fashion executive (born 1949)

Princess Georgina
- Countess of Valmareno
- Born: Georgina Maria Natividad de Faucigny-Lucinge et Coligny; 23 December 1949 (age 76); Rio de Janeiro, Brazil
- Spouse: Rodrigo Tiberto Brandolini d'Adda, Count of Valmareno (m. 1975)
- Issue: Cornelia Brandolini d'Adda; Bianca Brandolini d'Adda
Names
- Georgina Maria Natividad Brandolini d'Adda
- House: Faucigny
- Occupation: Fashion designer, businesswoman, socialite

Princess Georgina Brandolini d'Adda, Contessa di Valmareno (born Princess Georgina Maria Natividad de Faucigny-Lucinge et Coligny; 23 December 1949) is a French-Brazilian fashion executive and designer.

== Early and personal life ==
Princess Georgina Maria Natividad de Faucigny-Lucinge et Coligny was born on 23 December 1949 in Rio de Janeiro. Her father was Prince Jean-Louis de Faucigny-Lucinge, a French aristocrat, and her mother was Sylvia Régis de Oliveira, the only daughter of Raul Régis de Oliveira, a Brazilian diplomat who served as Brazil's Ambassador to the United Kingdom from 1925 to 1939. She grew up in Paris. On 12 June 1975, she married Rodrigo Tiberto Brandolini d'Adda, Conte di Valmareno, an Italian nobleman who was the son of Cristiana Brandolini d'Adda and nephew of Gianni Agnelli, in a Catholic ceremony at St. Thomas Aquinas Church in Paris, becoming Countess of Valmareno. They have two children, Donna Cornelia Brandolini d'Adda and Donna Bianca Brandolini d'Adda. The couple splits their time between homes in Geneva and Trancoso, Bahia.

In 2011, Countess Brandolini d'Adda sued to have the singer João Gilberto evicted from an apartment she owns in Leblon.

== Career ==
Countess Brandolini d'Adda was working as an intern for Dior when she was introduced to Italian fashion designer Valentino Garavani during a Carnival celebration in Rio de Janeiro. She worked for Valentino for twenty years as an artistic muse, personal aide, and director of external and public relations. In 1983 she was added to the International Best Dressed List. After leaving Valentino, Brandolini d'Adda became a partner at Balmain, serving as the general manager and director of ready-to-wear as well as a marketing strategist, where she developed the fashion house's international business. She began her own line of luxury knitwear in 2004. She now works as a representative for the international interests of Iguatemi Empresa de Shopping Centers.
