= Carlos Augusto R. Santos-Neves =

Brazilian diplomat

Carlos Augusto R. Santos-Neves (born 1944) was the Brazilian ambassador to the United Kingdom from 2008 to 2010 He was succeeded in that post by Roberto Jaguaribe.

Prior to that, Santos-Neves had been ambassador to Russia, Canada and Mexico and Consul General of Brazil in New York.
