= Gina de Araújo =

Brazilian composer and singer

Maria Georgina Araújo de Olinda Régis de Oliveira (April 3, 1890 – 1960) was a Brazilian composer and singer.

Born in Rio de Janeiro, Araujo traveled to Paris to study voice; her teachers there included Jules Massenet, Jean de Reszke, and André Gedalge. As a composer she wrote piano pieces and songs, as well as some larger-scale works for orchestra. She was married to the diplomat Raul Régis de Oliveira, upon whose death she composed a requiem mass. She died in the city of her birth.
