= José Joaquim Moniz de Aragão =

Brazilian diplomat (1887 - 1974)

José Joaquim de Lima e Silva Moniz de Aragão (15 May 1887 – 20 July 1974) was Brazilian ambassador to the United Kingdom, 1940–52. His wife was Dona Isabel Moniz de Aragao.

== Philately ==
Moniz de Aragão was a noted philatelist who was added to the Roll of Distinguished Philatelists in 1949.
