= Brandolini =

Brandolini may refer to:

- Brandolini (surname), Italian surname
- Brandolini's law, internet adage
- Brandolini family, Italian family

== See also ==
- Brando
