= Brazil–Italy football rivalry =

Football rivalry between the national football teams of Brazil and Italy

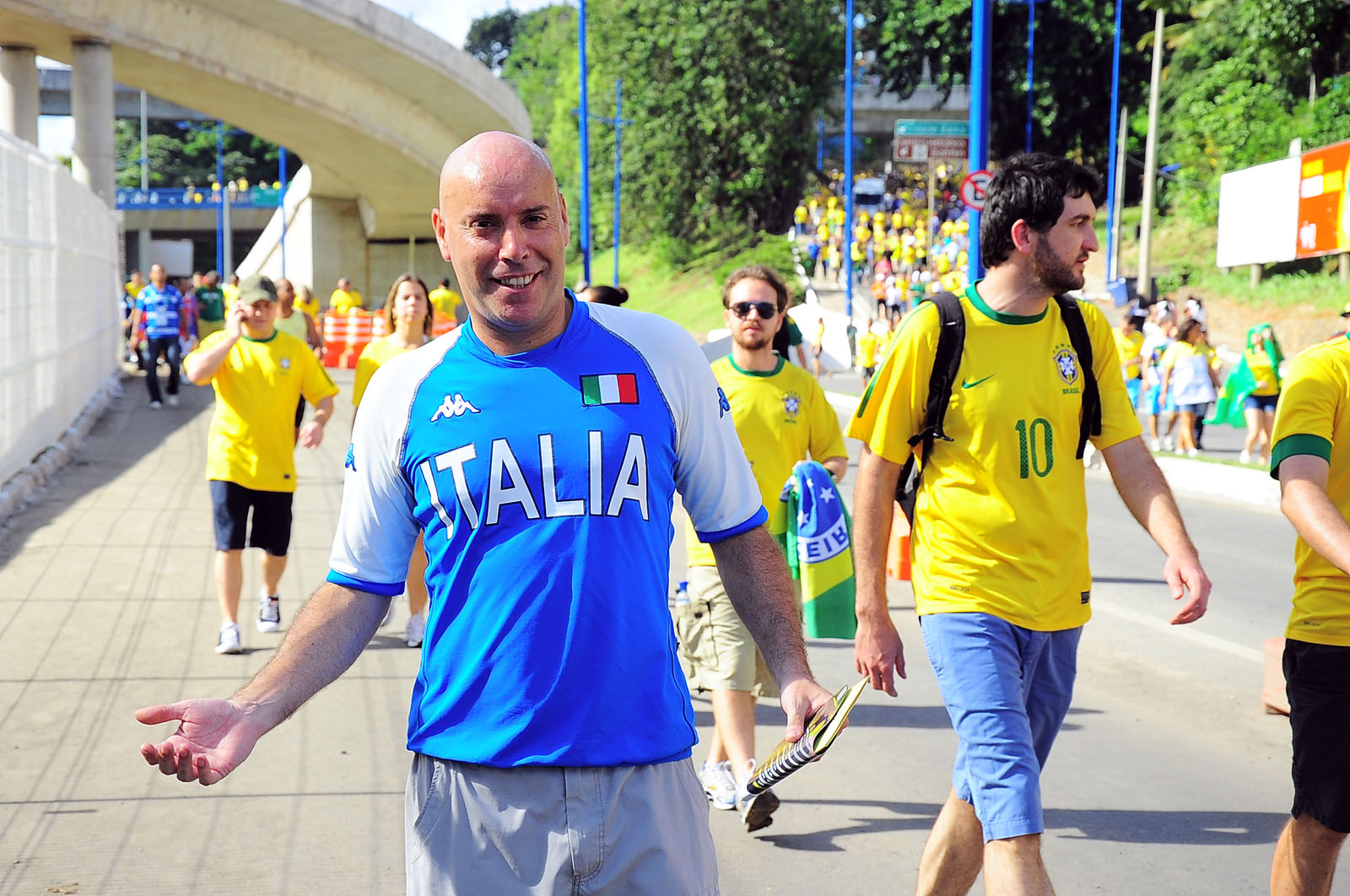
- Fans prior to the 2013 FIFA Confederations Cup match between Brazil and Italy.
- Location: Brazil (CONMEBOL); Italy (UEFA)
- Teams: Brazil; Italy
- First meeting: 16 June 1938; FIFA World Cup; Italy 2–1 Brazil
- Latest meeting: 22 June 2013; FIFA Confederations Cup; Brazil 4–2 Italy

Statistics
- Total meetings: 16
- Most wins: Brazil (8)
- All-time series: Brazil: 8 Drawn: 3 Italy: 5
- Largest victory: Five games (three-goal margin each)
- Largest goal scoring: Italy 3–3 Brazil; Tournoi de France (8 June 1997); Brazil 4–2 Italy; FIFA Confederations Cup (22 June 2013)

The Brazil–Italy football rivalry, also known as the Clássico Mundial in Portuguese or the World Derby in English, is a football rivalry between the national football teams of Brazil and Italy, the two most successful football nations in the world, having achieved nine World Cups between them. They have played against each other five times in the World Cup. Most notably, the 1970 World Cup Final and the 1994 World Cup Final in which Brazil won 4–1 in the former, and 3–2 on penalties after a goalless draw in the latter, as well as the semifinals of the 1938 World Cup and the final second group stage match of the 1982 World Cup won 3–2 by Italy.

They have also met at two FIFA Confederations Cups as well as in the friendlies tournaments 1976 U.S.A. Bicentennial Cup and the 1997 Tournoi de France.

Brazil have won a total of eight meetings, while Italy have won five and three have been drawn.

The most recent meeting ended in a 4–2 victory for Brazil in Salvador, Brazil, on 22 June 2013.

== Comparison in major tournaments ==
Key

Denotes which team finished better in that particular competition.
DNQ: Did not qualify.
DNP: Did not participate.
TBD: To be determined.

Tournament	Brazil	Italy	Notes
1930 FIFA World Cup	6th	DNP	
1934 FIFA World Cup	14th	1st	Tournament hosted by Italy.
1938 FIFA World Cup	3rd	1st	In the second round, Italy defeated Brazil 2–1.
1950 FIFA World Cup	2nd	7th	Tournament hosted by Brazil.
1954 FIFA World Cup	5th	10th	
1958 FIFA World Cup	1st	DNQ	
1962 FIFA World Cup	1st	9th	
1966 FIFA World Cup	11th	9th	
1970 FIFA World Cup	1st	2nd	In the final, Brazil defeated Italy 4–1.
1974 FIFA World Cup	4th	10th	
1978 FIFA World Cup	3rd	4th	In the third place match, Brazil defeated Italy 2–1.
1982 FIFA World Cup	5th	1st	In the second group stage, Italy defeated Brazil 3–2.
1986 FIFA World Cup	5th	12th	
1990 FIFA World Cup	9th	3rd	Tournament hosted by Italy.
1994 FIFA World Cup	1st	2nd	In the final, Brazil defeated Italy 3–2 on penalties after the match ended 0–0 after extra time.
1998 FIFA World Cup	2nd	5th	
2002 FIFA World Cup	1st	15th	
2006 FIFA World Cup	5th	1st	
2010 FIFA World Cup	6th	26th	
2014 FIFA World Cup	4th	22nd	Tournament hosted by Brazil.
2018 FIFA World Cup	6th	DNQ	
2022 FIFA World Cup	7th	DNQ	
2026 FIFA World Cup	11th	DNQ	
2030 FIFA World Cup	TBD	TBD	

== Major encounters ==
=== 1938 FIFA World Cup ===
During the 1938 World Cup semi-final on 16 June, nine minutes after Gino Colaussi's 51st-minute breakthrough, Giuseppe Meazza doubled Italy's lead from the penalty spot. While Meazza was getting ready to take the penalty, the elastic in his shorts snapped, causing the Inter Milan striker to hold them up with his left hand when taking the kick. Romeu scored a late Brazilian consolation as Italy went on to win the match 2–1 over Brazil and subsequently the World Cup in the final against Hungary for their second straight World Cup title.

16 June 1938
18:00 WEST

Italy	2–1	Brazil
Colaussi 51'; Meazza 60' (pen.)	Report	Romeu 87'

Stade Vélodrome, Marseille
Attendance: 33,000
Referee: Hans Wüthrich (Switzerland)

=== 1970 FIFA World Cup ===
Italy reached the final of the 1970 World Cup on 21 June by defeating West Germany 4–3 in one of the most memorable matches of all time, five of the seven goals coming in extra time. However, Ferruccio Valcareggi's men were beaten in Mexico City four days later. Roberto Boninsegna cancelled out Pelé's 18th-minute opener, Brazil scored three goals in the second half by Gérson, Jairzinho and Carlos Alberto, with no answer from Italy as Brazil went on to win 4–1 for their third World Cup title.

21 June 1970
12:00 CST

Brazil	4–1	Italy
Pelé 18'; Gérson 66'; Jairzinho 71'; Carlos Alberto 86'	Report	Boninsegna 37'

Estadio Azteca, Mexico City
Attendance: 107,412
Referee: Rudi Glöckner (East Germany)

=== 1978 FIFA World Cup ===
On 24 June, Brazil and Italy were matched up for the match for third place of the 1978 World Cup after both sides finished second in their respective groups in the second round. Brazil won the position of third place, knocking Italy to fourth after a 2–1 win with goals by Nelinho in the 64th minute and Dirceu in the 71st minute, although Italy's Franco Causio scored first in the 38th minute.

24 June 1978
15:00 ART

Brazil	2–1	Italy
Nelinho 64'; Dirceu 71'	Report	Causio 38'

Estadio Monumental, Buenos Aires
Attendance: 69,659
Referee: Abraham Klein (Israel)

=== 1982 FIFA World Cup ===
It was the final second round group stage match for Group C in the 1982 World Cup on 5 July. The match was won by Italy 3–2, with Italian striker Paolo Rossi scoring a hat-trick. The result eliminated Brazil from the tournament while Italy went on to win it. The match has been described as one of the greatest football matches of all time.

5 July 1982
17:15 CEST

Italy	3–2	Brazil
Rossi 5', 25', 74'	Report	Sócrates 12'; Falcão 68'

Sarrià Stadium, Barcelona
Attendance: 44,000
Referee: Abraham Klein (Israel)

=== 1994 FIFA World Cup ===
In the 1994 World Cup on 17 July, after 120 minutes of goalless action during the final at the Rose Bowl in Pasadena, California, United States, Italians Franco Baresi, Massaro and Roberto Baggio missed their penalty kicks as Brazil went on to win 3–2 in the resulting penalty shoot-out for their fourth World Cup title.

17 July 1994
12:30 PDT

Brazil	0–0 (a.e.t.)	Italy
	Report
Penalties
Márcio Santos (penalty missed); Romário (penalty scored); Branco (penalty scored); Dunga (penalty scored)	3–2	(penalty missed) Baresi; (penalty scored) Albertini; (penalty scored) Evani; (penalty missed) Massaro; (penalty missed) R. Baggio

Rose Bowl, Pasadena
Attendance: 94,194
Referee: Sándor Puhl (Hungary)

=== 2009 FIFA Confederations Cup ===
On 21 June, Italy and Brazil were matched up for the final group game of the 2009 Confederations Cup, which saw Brazil advance with a win 3–0 with two goals by Luís Fabiano in the 37th minute and 43rd minute as well as an own goal by Italy's Andrea Dossena in the 45th minute. Since the United States won their final group match, they over took and eliminated Italy on goals scored, although level on points. Brazil went on to win the Confederations Cup for the third time.

21 June 2009
20:30 SAST

Italy	0–3	Brazil
	Report	Luís Fabiano 37', 43'; Dossena 45' (o.g.)

Loftus Versfeld Stadium, Pretoria
Attendance: 41,195
Referee: Benito Archundia (Mexico)

=== 2013 FIFA Confederations Cup ===
On 22 June, Italy and Brazil faced off in the following final group match of the 2013 Confederations Cup hosted by Brazil, with both sides already qualified after winning their first two matches. Brazil yet again edged Italy, this time 4–2 with Brazilian goals by Dante in the final minute of stoppage time in the first half, Neymar in the 55th minute, and Fred in the 66th minute and the 89th minute, with Italian goals coming from Emanuele Giaccherini in the 51st minute and Giorgio Chiellini in the 71st minute. Italy would go on to beat Uruguay in the third-place position, while Brazil went on to with the Confederations Cup for the 4th time after beating out Spain.

22 June 2013
16:00 BRT

Italy	2–4	Brazil
Giaccherini 51'; Chiellini 71'	Report	Dante 45+1'; Neymar 55'; Fred 66', 89'

Itaipava Arena Fonte Nova, Salvador
Attendance: 48,874
Referee: Ravshan Irmatov (Uzbekistan)

== List of matches ==
Number	Date	Location	Competition	Game	Results
1	16 June 1938	(France) Marseille	1938 World Cup	Italy – Brazil	2–1
2	25 April 1956	(Italy) Milan	Friendly	Italy – Brazil	3–0
3	1 July 1956	(Brazil) Rio de Janeiro	Friendly	Brazil – Italy	2–0
4	12 May 1963	(Italy) Milan	Friendly	Italy – Brazil	3–0
5	21 June 1970	Mexico City	1970 World Cup	Brazil – Italy	4–1
6	9 June 1973	(Italy) Rome	Friendly	Italy – Brazil	2–0
7	31 May 1976	(United States) New Haven	Bicentennial Cup	Brazil – Italy	4–1
8	24 June 1978	(Argentina) Buenos Aires	1978 World Cup	Brazil – Italy	2–1
9	5 July 1982	(Spain) Barcelona	1982 World Cup	Brazil – Italy	2–3
10	14 October 1989	(Italy) Bologna	Friendly	Italy – Brazil	0–1
11	17 July 1994	(United States) Pasadena	1994 World Cup	Brazil – Italy	0–0 (3–2 p)
12	8 June 1997	(France) Lyon	Tournoi de France	Italy – Brazil	3–3
13	10 February 2009	(England) London	Friendly	Brazil – Italy	2–0
14	21 June 2009	(South Africa) Pretoria	2009 Confederations Cup	Brazil – Italy	3–0
15	21 March 2013	(Switzerland) Lancy	Friendly	Brazil – Italy	2–2
16	22 June 2013	(Brazil) Salvador	2013 Confederations Cup	Brazil – Italy	4–2

== Statistics ==
=== Overall ===
As of 22 June 2013

Competition	Matches	Wins		Draws	Goals	
Competition	Matches	Brazil	Italy	Draws	Brazil	Italy
FIFA World Cup	5	2	2	1*	9	7
FIFA Confederations Cup	2	2	0	0	7	2
All competitions	7	4	2	1	16	9
Friendly	7	3	3	1	7	10
Bicentennial Cup Tournament	1	1	0	0	4	1
Tournoi de France	1	0	0	1	3	3
All matches	16	8	5	3	30	23

* Brazil overcame Italy in the 1994 FIFA World Cup final via penalty shoot-out.

=== Official titles comparison ===
Competition	Brazil	Italy
World Cup	5	4
Confederations Cup	4	0
CONMEBOL–UEFA Cup of Champions	0	0
Olympic Games	1*	1*
Total titles	10	5

- Note: Only the Olympic titles from 1908 to 1948 are considered official senior titles.

== See also ==
- Brazil–Italy relations
- List of association football rivalries
- Italian Brazilians
