= Jesuit College, Juiz de Fora =

Private school in Minas Gerais, Brazil

Location
- Pres. Itamar Franco Ave., Juiz de Fora, Minas Gerais; Brazil
- Coordinates: 21°46′5.9″S 43°21′2.59″W

Information
- Type: Private primary and secondary school
- Motto: Faith and science
- Religious affiliation: Catholic
- Denomination: Jesuit
- Established: 1956; 70 years ago
- Grades: K through secondary
- Gender: Coeducational
- Campus size: 20 acres (8.1 ha)
- Website: colegiodosjesuitas.com.br

Jesuit College is a private Catholic primary and secondary school in Juiz de Fora, Minas Gerais, Brazil. It was founded by the Society of Jesus in 1956 and occupies 20 acres (8.1 ha) of forested land in the center of the city. In 2015 the college was rated 51st nationally in Brazil among those schools that took the National Secondary Education Examination (Enem).

== History ==
Families in Juiz de Fora acquired a palm farm and persuaded the Jesuits to open a school there. Eleven years later the first headquarters of "Our Lady Immaculate College" opened in the city with seven Jesuits – two priests, three brothers, and two scholastics – and 40 students in attendance.

The secondary school was added in 1958. It was later replaced by a new building on Avenida Presidente Itamar Franco. In 1963 pre-primary was added and in 1964 the scientific course. Enrollment had grown to 416 students. By 1967 "Jesuit College" had 700 students, including six women.

== See also ==
- List of Jesuit educational institutions
