= List of ambassadors of Brazil to the United Kingdom =

Ambassador of Brazil to the United Kingdom
- Embaixador do Brasil no Reino Unido
- Coat of arms of Brazil

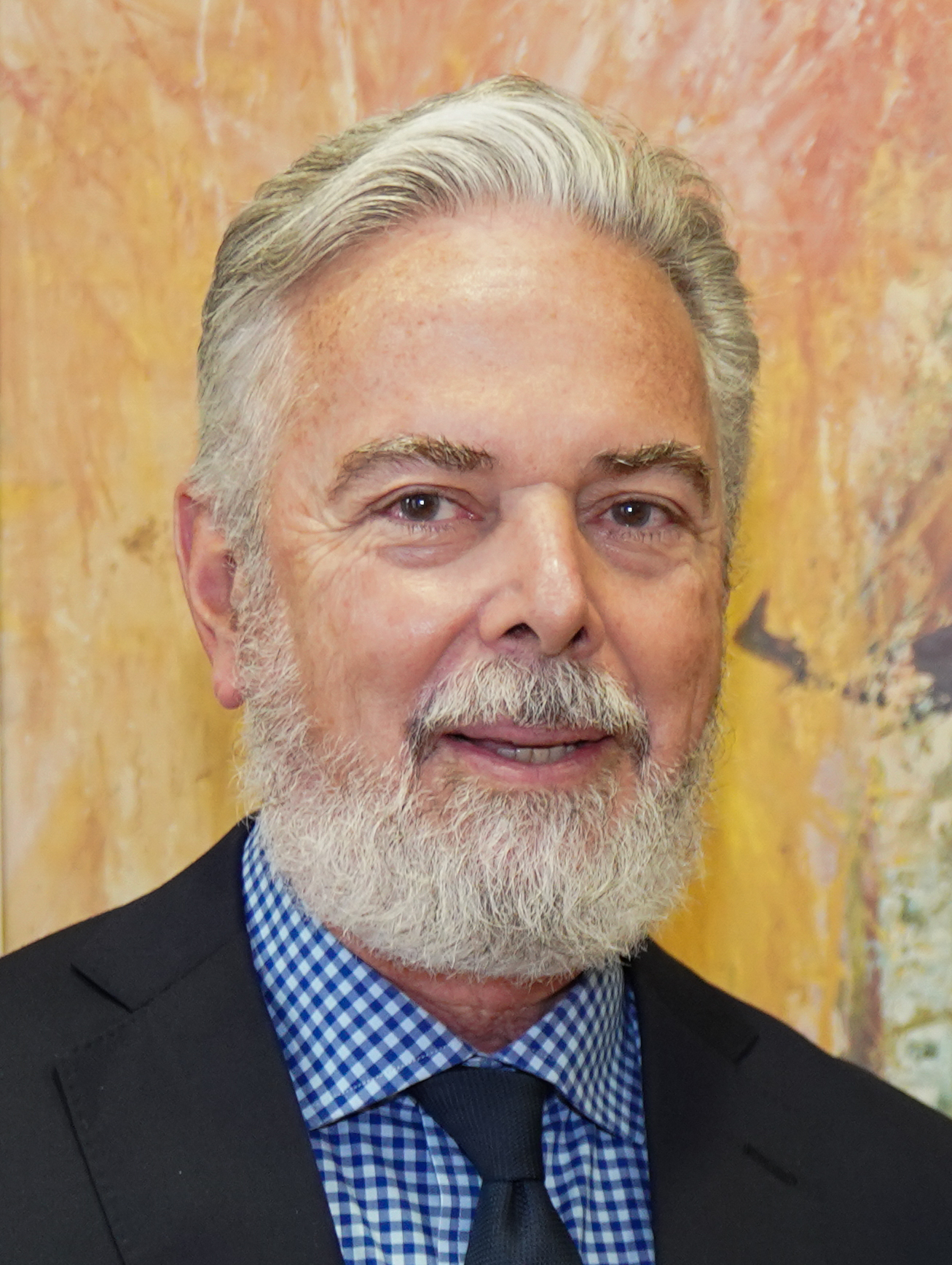
- Incumbent; Antonio Patriota since 15 September 2023
- Ministry of Foreign Affairs
- Style: Mr Ambassador (informal); His Excellency (diplomatic)
- Reports to: Minister of Foreign Affairs
- Seat: 14-16 Cockspur Street; SW1Y 5BL; London
- Appointer: The president with Senate advice and consent
- Term length: No fixed term
- Formation: 1823
- First holder: Manoel Pessoa, The Viscount of Itabaiana
- Website: Embassy of Brazil in London

A list of the ambassadors of Brazil, or other heads of mission, to the United Kingdom:

Name	Title	Service	Notes
Manoel Rodrigues Gameiro Pessoa, Viscount of Itabaiana	Minister Plenipotentiary	1823	
Felisberto Caldeira Brant, Marquis of Barbacena	Minister Plenipotentiary	1824	
Manoel Rodrigues Gameiro Pessoa	Minister Plenipotentiary	1825	
José Araujo Ribeiro, Viscount of Rio Grande	Minister Plenipotentiary	1831	
Manoel Antonio Galvão	Minister Plenipotentiary	1835	
Francisco Jê Acaiaba de Montezuma	Minister Plenipotentiary	1840	
José Marques Lisboa	Minister Plenipotentiary	1841	
Sergio Teixeira de Macedo	Minister Plenipotentiary	1851–54	
Francisco Ignácio de Carvalho Moreira	Minister Plenipotentiary	1855–63	
Francisco Ignácio de Carvalho Moreira	Minister Plenipotentiary	1866–67	
José Carlos de Almeida Arêas, Viscount of Ourem	Minister Plenipotentiary	1868–73	
Francisco Ignácio de Carvalho Moreira, Baron of Penedo	Minister Plenipotentiary	1878–89	
João Arthur Souza Corrêa	Minister Plenipotentiary	1890–1900	
Joaquim Nabuco	Minister Plenipotentiary	1900	
Francisco Régis de Oliveira	Minister Plenipotentiary	1905–13	
Eduardo Lisboa	Minister Plenipotentiary	1913–14	
Fontoura Xavier	Minister Plenipotentiary	1913–20	On 2 January 1919, the Brazilian legation in London was upgraded to an embassy.
Domício da Gama	Ambassador Extraordinary and Plenipotentiary	1920–24	First Brazilian ambassador to the UK.
Raul Régis de Oliveira	Ambassador	1925–37	
João Joaquim de Lima e Silva Moniz de Aragão	Ambassador	1940–52	
Samuel de Souza-Leão Gracie	Ambassador	1952–56	
Francisco de Assis Chateaubriand de Mello	Ambassador	1957–61	
José Cochrane de Alencar	Ambassador	1961–63	
Carlos Alves de Souza	Ambassador	1964–66	
Jayme Sloan Chermont	Ambassador	1966–68	
Sérgio Corrêa Affonso da Costa	Ambassador	1968–74	
Roberto Campos	Ambassador	1975–82	
Mario Gibson Alves Barboza	Ambassador	1982–86	
Celso de Souza e Silva	Ambassador	1986–88	
Paulo Tarso Flecha de Lima	Ambassador	1990–93	
Rubens Antonio Barbosa	Ambassador	1994–99	
Sérgio Silva Amaral	Ambassador	1999–2001	
Celso Luiz Nunes Amorim	Ambassador	2001–02	
José Maurício de Figueiredo Bustani	Ambassador	2002–08	
Carlos Augusto R. Santos-Neves	Ambassador	2008–10	
Roberto Jaguaribe	Ambassador	2010–15	
Eduardo dos Santos	Ambassador	2015–18	
Fred Arruda	Ambassador	2018–23	
Antonio Patriota	Ambassador	2023–present	

== See also ==
- Brazil–United Kingdom relations
- List of ambassadors of the United Kingdom to Brazil
