= School of Engineering of Juiz de Fora =

Engineering school of the Federal University of Juiz de Fora in Brazil

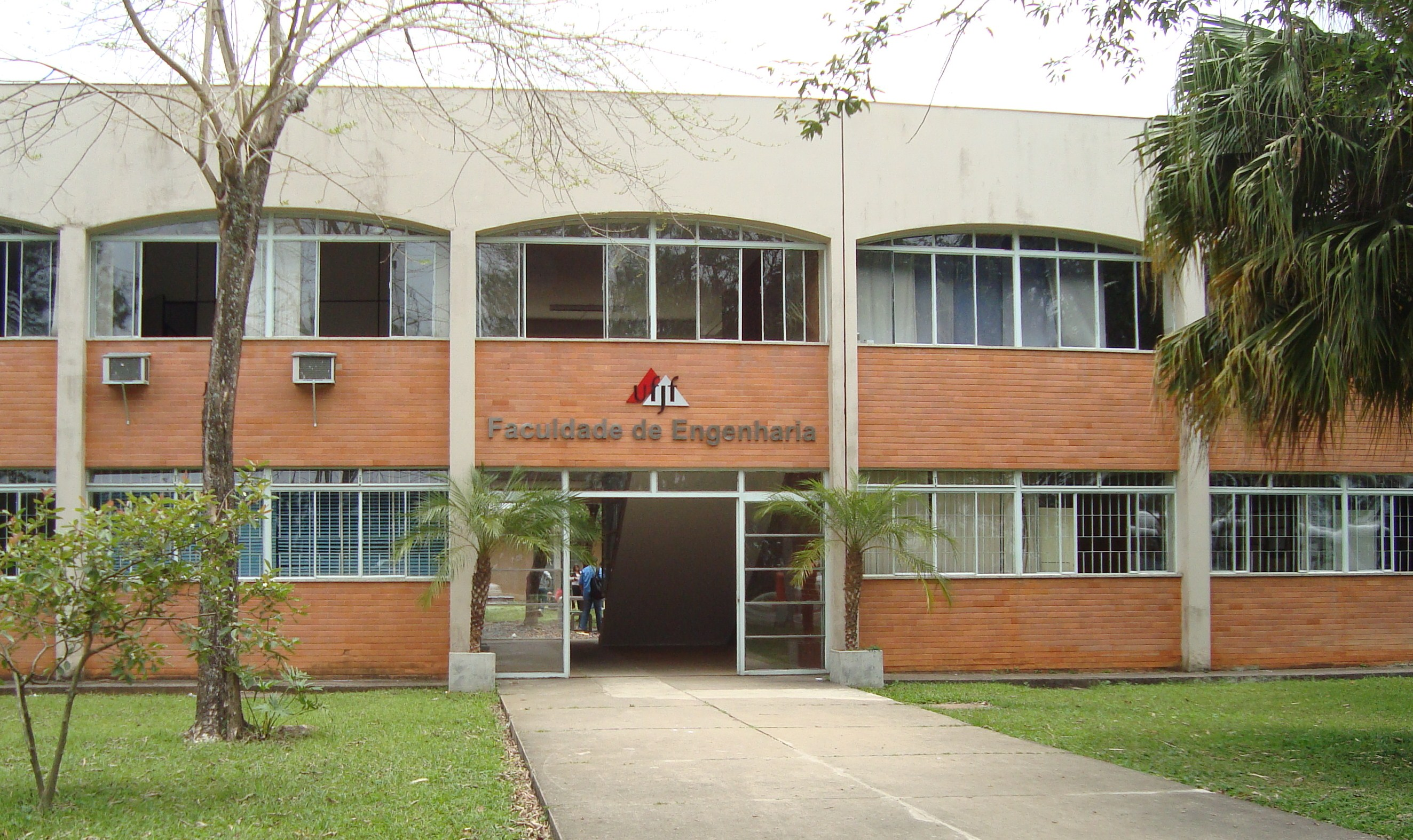
An image of the Engineering College, University of Juiz de Fora, Brazil

The School of Engineering of Juiz de Fora (Portuguese: Escola de Engenharia de Juiz de Fora) was an engineering college in Juiz de Fora, Brazil. Since 1960, it has formed the Faculty of Engineering the Federal University of Juiz de Fora (UFJF). Brazil’s former president, Itamar Franco, was an alumnus.

It was established in 1914 in Juiz de Fora, Minas Gerais, and offered a five-year program in civil and electrotechnic engineering. In 1960, the school merged with the city’s schools of Medicine, Pharmacy, and Law to form the Federal University of Juiz de Fora (UFJF).

The Faculty of Engineering offers programs in civil, production, electrical (telecommunications; energy and power systems; electronics; robotics and automation), mechanical, computer, sanitary and environmental engineering, as well as architecture.
