= Fontoura Xavier =

Municipality in Rio Grande do Sul, Brazil

Coordinates: 28°59′S 52°21′W

- Municipality
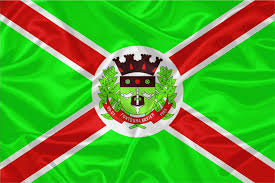
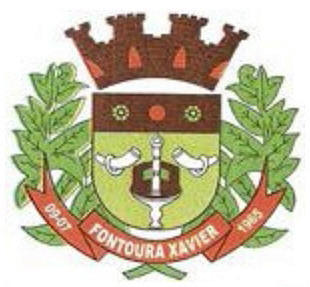
- Flag Coat of arms

- Location of Fontoura Xavier in Rio Grande do Sul
- Country: Brazil
- Region: South
- State: Rio Grande do Sul
- Mesoregion: Noroeste Rio-Grandense
- Microregion: Soledad
- Founded: 9 July 1969

Government
  - Mayor: Luiz Armando Taffarel (PSD, 2021 - 2024)

Area
  - Total: 583.465 km^{2} (225.277 sq mi)

Population (2021)
  - Total: 10,181
  - Density: 17.449/km^{2} (45.193/sq mi)
- Demonym: Fontourense
- Time zone: UTC−3 (BRT)
- Website: Official website

Fontoura Xavier is a municipality in the state of Rio Grande do Sul, Brazil. As of 2020, the estimated population was 10,241.

== See also ==
- List of municipalities in Rio Grande do Sul
