= Muriel Brandolini =

French-Vietnamese interior designer

Muriel Brandolini d'Adda
- Full name: Muriel Brandolini d'Adda di Valmareno
- Born: Muriel Phan van Thiet; Montpellier, France
- Spouse: Count Nuno Carlo Brandolini d'Adda di Valmareno
- Occupation: Interior designer, decorator

Countess Muriel Brandolini d'Adda di Valmareno (née Phan van Thiet), known professionally as Muriel Brandolini, is a French-Vietnamese interior designer and decorator. In 2016 Brandolini was named one of the world's top 100 designers by Architectural Digest.

== Early life ==
Muriel Phan van Thiet was born in Montpellier, France and grew up in Saigon, Vietnam and in Martinique. Her father was a lawyer from Vietnam and her mother was a pianist of Venezuelan and French ancestry. She grew up speaking French as her primary language. Her father died when she was young, during the Vietnamese War, which prompted the family to move to Martinique. When she was fifteen years old her mother sent her to Paris to study secretarial skills after she had dropped out of her private high school in Martinique.

== Career ==
Brandolini came to New York City in 1979 and began working as a salesperson in Deschamps. She was discovered by Franca Sozzani who hired her as a fashion stylist for Italian Vogue before switching to design. Her work as a decorator and interior designer has been featured in Harper’s Bazaar, World of Interiors, Vogue, Architectural Digest, Vanity Fair, and Elle Decor. She is noted for her approach to vibrant colors within her work. She has been commissioned by celebrities, royalty and other public figures including Matt Lauer, Pia Getty, Pavlos, Crown Prince of Greece and Marie-Chantal, Crown Princess of Greece. She wrote a book on interior design titled The World of Muriel Brandolini, which was published by Rizzoli in October 2011. In 2016 Brandolini was named one of the top 100 designers in the world by Architectural Digest. Brandolini has a pop-up shop in Southampton, which opened in the summer of 2015. She has collaborated with Barney's on decor and home furnishing merchandise.

== Personal life ==
Brandolini is married to Count Nuno Carlo Brandolini d'Adda di Valmareno, an Italian banker and the son of Count Brandolino Brandolini di Valmareno and Cristiana Agnelli. They have two children and live in Manhattan.

Brandolini's retreat in Hampton Bays, New York has been featured in Architectural Digest and the lifestyle blog Quintessence. Her Paris apartment has been featured in Galerie Magazine.
