= Palazzo Morosini Brandolin =

The Palazzo Morosini Brandolin is a Gothic-style palace located at the corner with the Rio di San Tomà, near Palazzo Tiepolo and across the canal from Ca' d'Oro on the Grand Canal, in the Sestieri of San Polo, Venice, Italy.

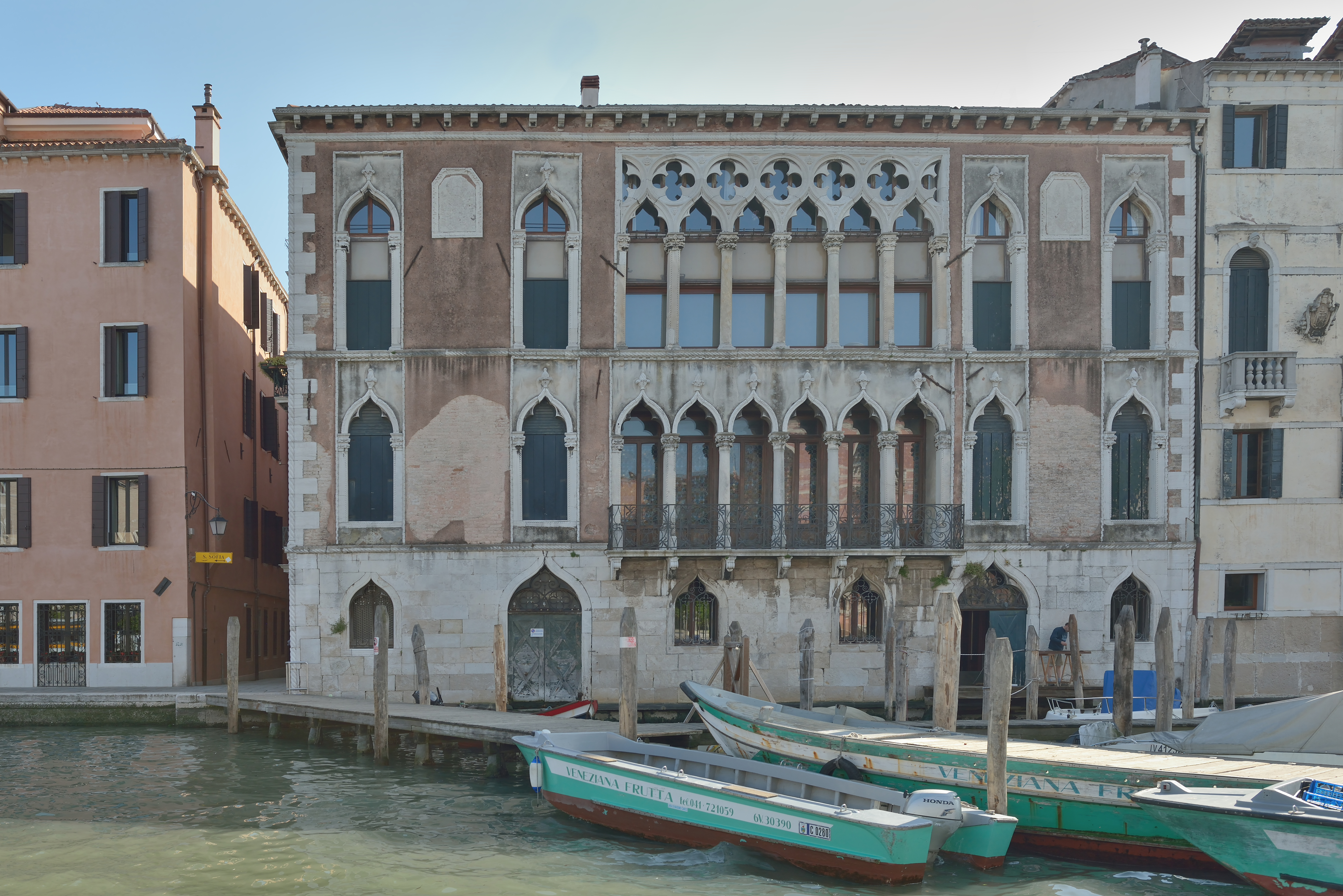
Palazzo Morosini Brandolin

== History ==
The palace was commissioned in the second half of the 15th century by the aristocratic Morosini family, but later transferred to the Brandolini, then Lago, then Topan families. Stylistically, the facade resembles that of the Ca' Foscari.

== Bibliography ==
- Brusegan, Marcello (2007). The palaces of Venice. Rome: Newton & Compton. p. 266. ISBN 978-88-541-0820 -2. Brusegan.
