= Roberto Jaguaribe =

Brazilian diplomat and trade official

Roberto Jaguaribe (born 27 December 1952) is a Brazilian diplomat and trade official who is a former ambassador to China and the United Kingdom and currently ambassador to Germany.

Jaguaribe graduated with a degree in Systems Engineering at the Pontifical Catholic University of Rio de Janeiro. He joined the Brazilian diplomatic service in 1978.

Jaguaribe served as the ambassador to China, the United Kingdom and Berlin, and was Minister-Counsellor at the Brazilian Embassy in Washington, DC.

At the Ministry of Foreign Affairs, Jaguaribe held the posts of Undersecretary General for Political Affairs II, Director of the Trade Promotion Department and head of the Intellectual Property and Sensitive Technologies Division, among others.

Jaguaribe also served as the President of the National Institute of Industrial Property (INPI), Secretary of Industrial Technology at the Ministry of Development, Industry and Foreign Trade (MDIC) and Secretary of International Affairs at the Ministry of Planning, Budget and Management (MPOG). Between 2016 and 2019, Jaguaribe was the CEO of ApexBrasil, the Brazilian Trade and Investment Promotion Agency.
