= Federal University of Juiz de Fora =

Public university in Minas Gerais, Brazil

Coordinates: 21°46′29″S 43°22′06″W

- Universidade Federal da Juiz de Fora
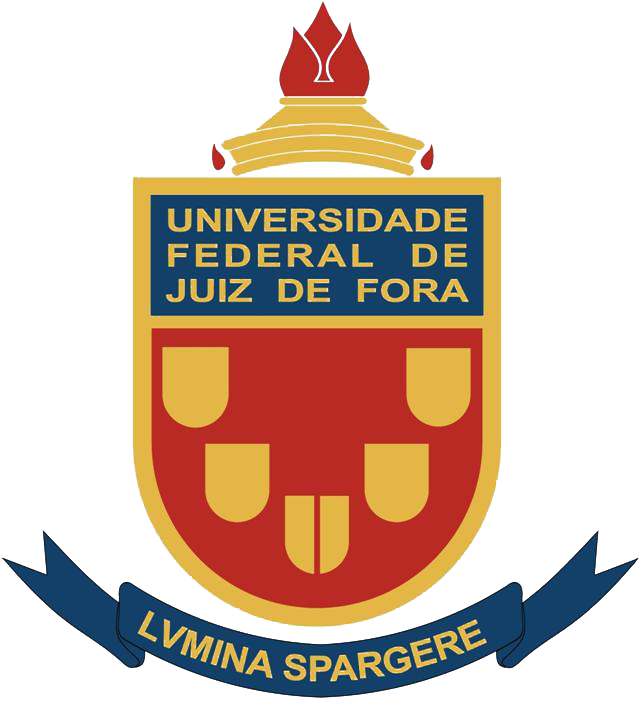
- Shield of the Federal University of Juiz de Fora
- Other names: UFJF
- Motto: Lvmina Spargere (Latin)
- Motto in English: Spread the Light.
- Type: Public federal university
- Established: 1960 (School of Law dates from 1923)
- Administrative staff: 2132
- Students: 16,361
- Location: Juiz de Fora and Governador Valadares, in the State of Minas Gerais, Brazil
- Colors: Yellow - Green
- Website: www.ufjf.br
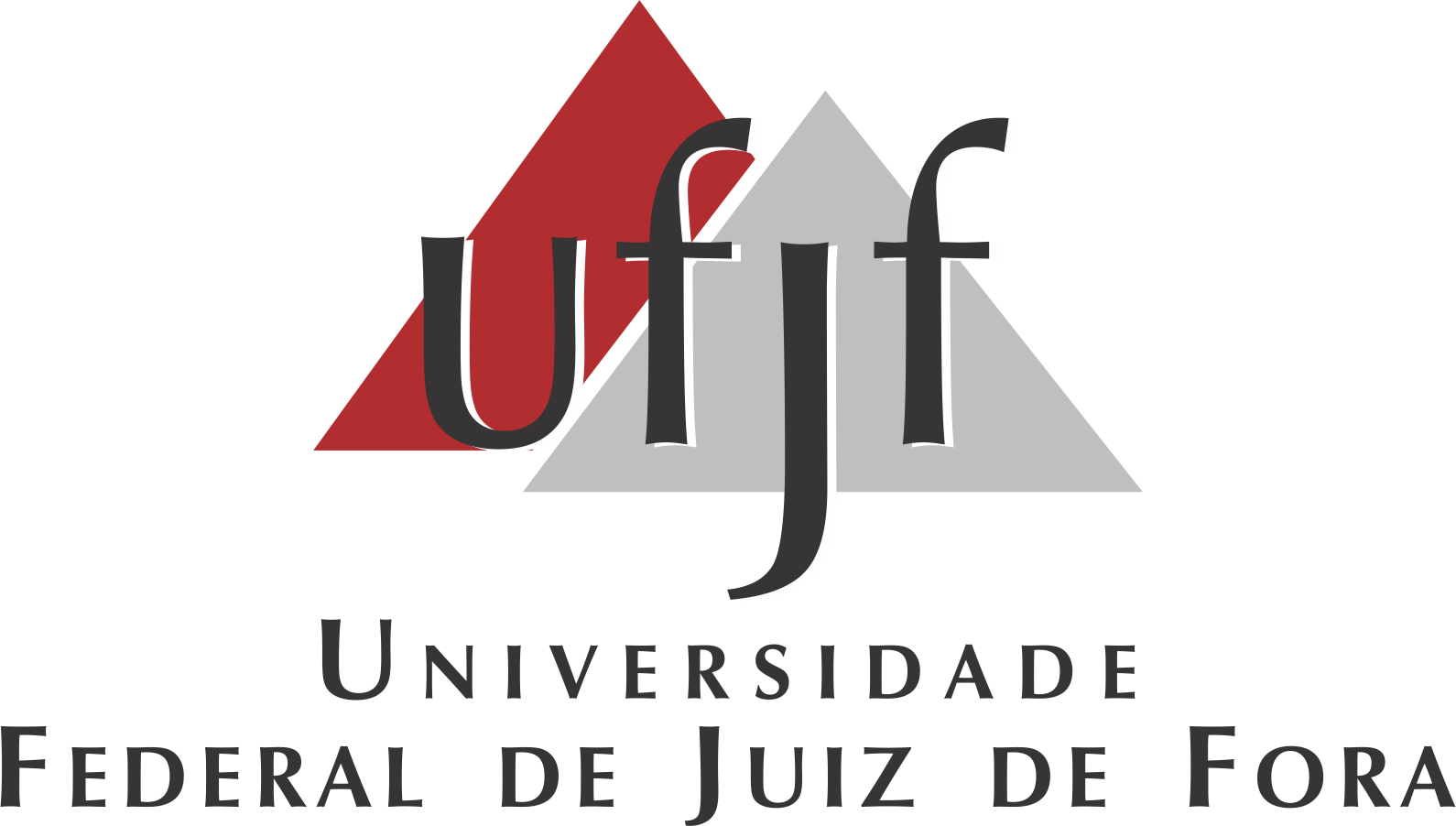

The Federal University of Juiz de Fora (Portuguese: Universidade Federal de Juiz de Fora, UFJF) is a public research university in Brazil. Throughout its over 50 years of existence, the university has undergone significant growth, strengthening the quality of undergraduate and graduate education while maintaining its role as an agent of community development.

== History ==
UFJF was established in 1960 by an act of Brazilian President Juscelino Kubitschek. At that time, colleges functioning in the city of Juiz de Fora were officially integrated by the government to constitute a university. In the earlier years, the courses offered were Medicine, Engineering, Economic Science, Law, Pharmacy and Dentistry. Later, the courses of Geography, Languages & Literature, Philosophy, Biological Sciences, Social Science and History were also opened.

The campus was built in 1969 and the courses offered under licensure were distributed among different campus units. The Social Communication (Journalism) course was created and became part of the law faculty departments.

During the 1970s, three institutes were created at the campus: Institute of Exact Sciences (ICE), Institute of Biological Sciences (ICB) and Institute of Human Sciences and Letters (ICHL), offering undergraduate programs. Later, these institutes also offered a range of postgraduate courses and research programs. Recent years have seen significant increases in external research funding, research staff, and graduates at these University Institutes.

Other research centers were established at the campus: the Biology of Reproduction Center (CBR) in 1971, which works as an animal facility and the Social Research Center (CPS), involved in research subjects such as urbanism, health, employment, culture and education.

The UFJF Historical Archive was founded in 1985 and represents an important source for local, regional and national history research, functioning as a documentation and educational center. Two years later, the UFJF Press was established. Its academic publishing includes journals and books in a wide variety of fields. In the technology and administrative fields, the Regional Center for Innovation and Transference of Technology (Critt), established in 1995, and the Technology Center-Agrosoft (Núcleo Softex), created in 1996, play a critical role in the regional development of new technologies by teaching and training new professionals. Since the 1990s, the university is also committed to promoting and establishing, with great success, Junior Enterprises specialized in different areas and formed exclusively by undergraduate students. In 2001, a UFJF Junior Enterprise was granted an ISO 9001 Certificate.

In 1999, a new academic unit was established: the Health Sciences Center (CCS), which comprises the School of Medicine, the School of Physiotherapy, the School of Nursing and the School of Dentistry. Several major hospitals are affiliated with the CCS.

In 2006, a new teaching hospital, the Health Care Center (CAS), was built as a resource to improve teaching, research, patient care and public service, increasing the services provided to nearby communities. In the same year, two other units were created: the Arts and Design Institute (IAD) and the Faculty of Languages and Literature.

== Schools and institutes ==
- Institute for Exact Sciences
  - Department of Computer Science
  - Department of Physics
  - Department of Chemistry
  - Department of Statistics
  - Department of Mathematics
- Institute of Biological Sciences
  - Department of Anatomy
  - Department of Biology
  - Department of Biochemistry
  - Department of Botany
  - Department of Human Nutrition
  - Department of Morphology
  - Department of Parasitology, Immunology and Microbiology
  - Department of Pharmacology
  - Department of Physiology
  - Department of Zoology
- Institute of Human Sciences
  - Department of Philosophy
  - Department of Social Sciences
  - Department of Psychology
  - Department of Tourism
  - Department of History
  - Department of Geography
  - Department of Religious Studies
- Institute of Arts And Design
  - Department of Art (Art Education, Design, Cinema, Fashion Design, Visual Art)
  - Department of Music
- School of Linguistics and Literature
- School of Medicine
- School of Physical Education and Sports
- School of Education
- School of Communications
- School of Engineering
- School of Architecture and Urbanism
- School of Law
- School of Economics
- School of Administration and Accounting

== See also ==
- Brazil University Rankings
- List of federal universities of Brazil
- Universities and Higher Education in Brazil
