= Brazil–Italy relations =

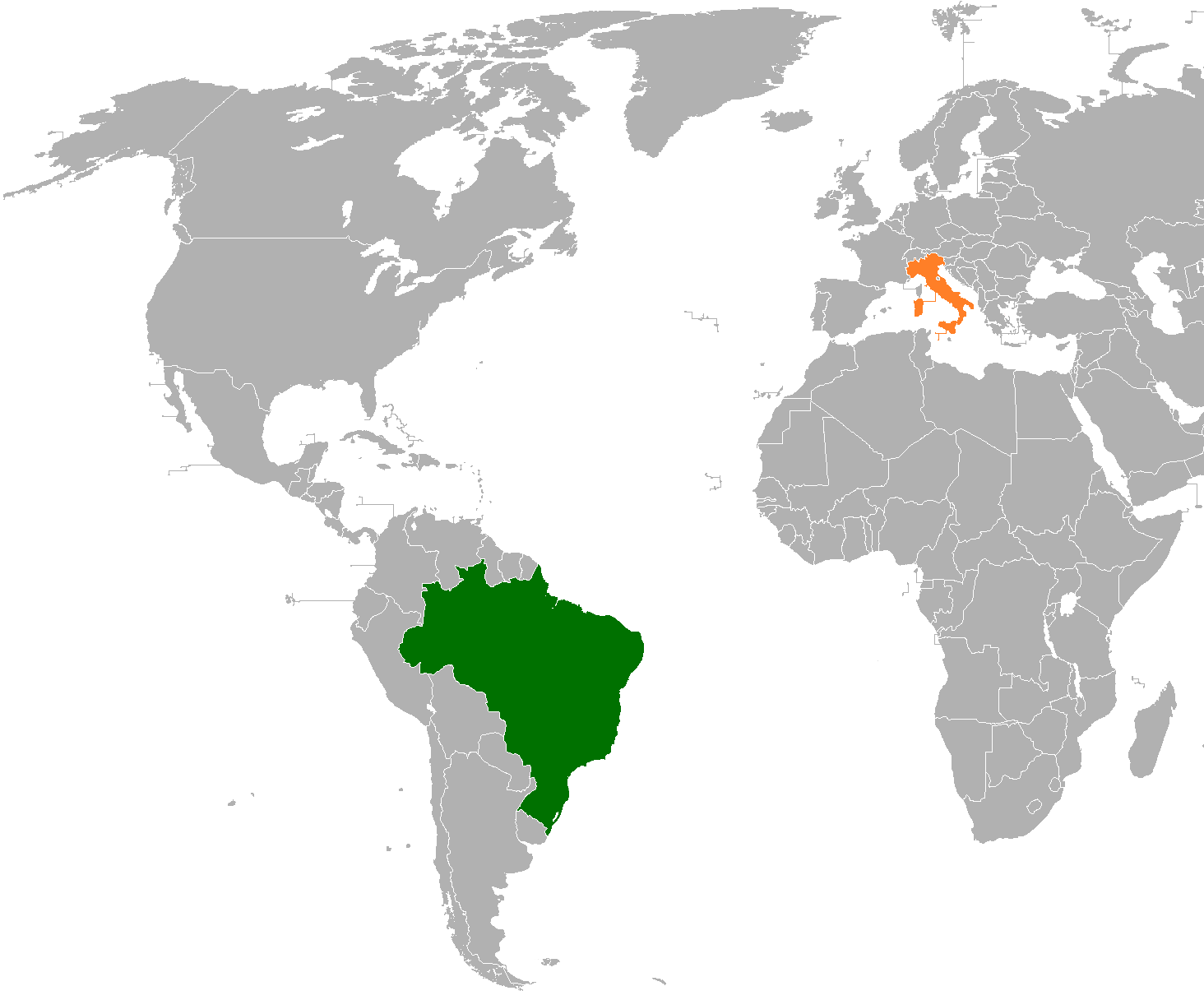
- Brazil: Italy

Brazil–Italy relations are the diplomatic relations between the Federative Republic of Brazil and the Italian Republic. Both nations enjoy friendly and semi-privileged relations, the importance of which centres on the history of Italian migration to Brazil. Approximately 31 million Brazilians claimed to have Italian ancestry (approximately 15% of the population) making it the largest number of people with full or partial Italian ancestry outside Italy, with the Brazilian city of São Paulo being the most populous city with Italian ancestry in the entire world. Both nations are mutual members of the G20 major economies, United Nations and the World Trade Organization.

== History ==
In September 1822, Brazil declared its independence from Portugal. In 1826, the Duchy of Parma recognized the independence of Brazil and in 1827, and ambassador from the Kingdom of the Two Sicilies arrived to Brazil. In 1836, future Italian unifier Giuseppe Garibaldi went into exile in Brazil and assisted in the separatist movement for the Brazilian State of Rio Grande do Sul. In 1861, Brazilian Emperor Pedro II recognized the Kingdom of Italy under King Victor Emmanuel II. In November 1861, Italy opened a diplomatic mission in Rio de Janeiro. In October 1871, Emperor Pedro II travelled to Italy as part of his European tour.

Italian migration to Brazil began in 1875 when Brazil began to promote migration to the country in order to increase its population and therefore created 'colonies' mostly in rural areas for Italians and other Europeans to migrate to. Between 1880 and 1920, more than one million Italians immigrated to Brazil. In 1924, Italian Prince of Piedmont (future King Umberto II) visited the city of Salvador, Bahia as Rio de Janeiro (the Brazilian capital at the time) was considered unsafe for the Prince and São Paulo was temporary taken over by rebels. The Prince's main visit to Brazil (and other South American nations) was part of a political plan of fascism to link the Italian people living outside Italy with their mother country.

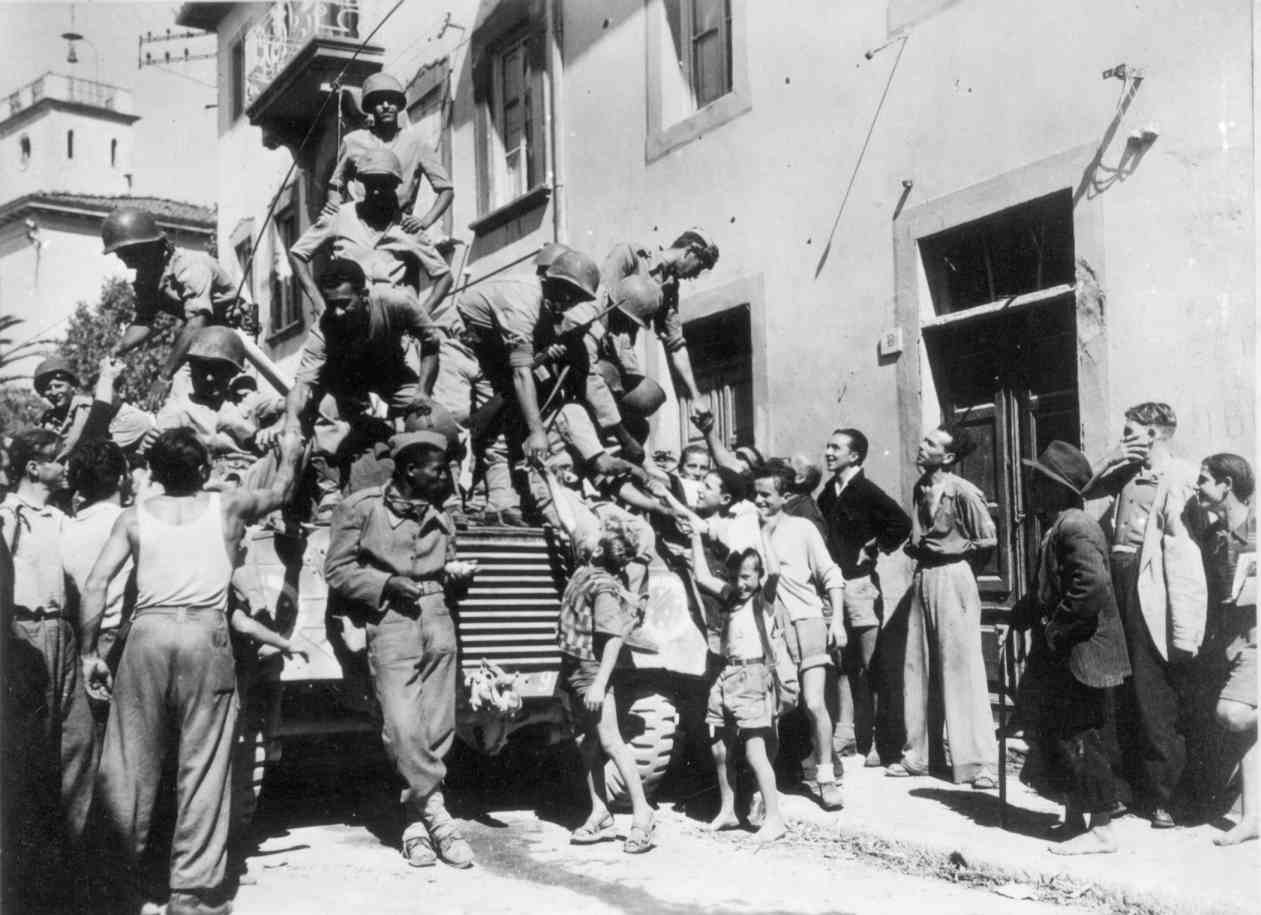
Brazilian soldiers in the town of Massarosa; September 1944.

During World War I, Brazil declared war on the Central Powers after the sinking and capturing of several Brazilian merchant ships and was the only Latin American nation to actively be involved in the war by sending eight war ships to Europe and 100 paramedics to France. At the end of the war, both Brazil and Italy partook in the Treaty of Versailles.

At the start of World War II in September 1939; Brazil remained neutral, however, German submarines (U-boats) sank six Brazilian ships in the Atlantic and Brazil declared war on Germany and Italy on 22 August 1942. During the war, Brazil sent an Expeditionary Force consisting of 23,000 soldiers which partook in the Italian Campaign. The Brazilian forces mainly fought within Tuscany and Emilia-Romagna regions. In 1944, Brazil restored full diplomatic relations with Italy.

Since the end of the world wars, both Brazil and Italy have strengthened their relations by agreeing to several bilateral accords such as an Agreement on Migration (1977); Agreement to avoid Double Taxation (1979); Extradition Treaty (1989); Treaty on Legal Cooperation in Criminal Matters (1993); Agreement on Scientific and Technological Cooperation (1997), among others. Both nations are active players in international organizations and leaders of both nations have paid official visits to each other nations, respectively, on numerous occasions.

== High-level visits ==
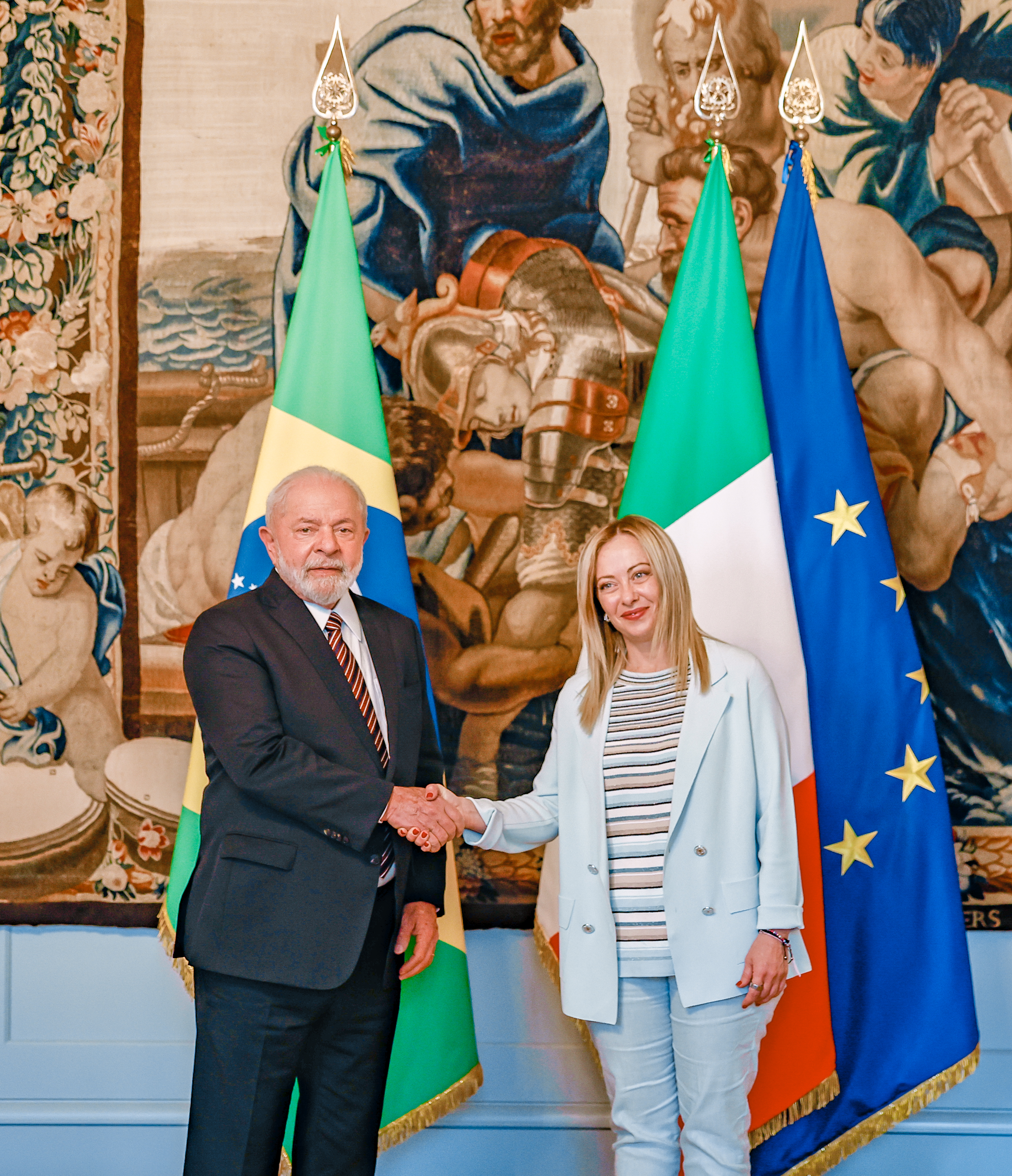
Brazilian President Luiz Inácio Lula da Silva meets with Italian Prime Minister Giorgia Meloni in Rome, 21 June 2023

High-level visits from Brazil to Italy

- President Fernando Collor de Mello (1990)
- President Fernando Henrique Cardoso (1997)
- President Luiz Inácio Lula da Silva (2005, 2009, 2023)
- President Dilma Rousseff (2013, 2015)
- President Jair Bolsonaro (2021)

High-level visits from Italy to Brazil

- President Giuseppe Saragat (1965)
- President Oscar Luigi Scalfaro (1995)
- President Carlo Azeglio Ciampi (2000)
- President Sergio Mattarella (2024)
- Prime Minister Romano Prodi (2006, 2007)
- Prime Minister Silvio Berlusconi (2009, 2010)
- Prime Minister Matteo Renzi (2016)

== Trade ==
In 2015, total trade between Brazil and Italy totaled US$7.4 billion. Italy is one of Brazil's top ten largest global trusted trading partners. In 2013, Italian investments in Brazil totaled US$17.9 billion. Italian car makers such as Ferrari, Fiat and Lamborghini have a presence in Brazil, as well as Italian fashion and food products. Brazilian companies such as Embraer and agricultural companies operate in Italy. In 2000, member nations of Mercosur (which includes Brazil) and the European Union (which includes Italy) began negotiations on a free trade agreement.

== Transportation ==
There are direct flights between Brazil and Italy with the following airlines: ITA Airways and LATAM Brasil.

== Bilateral agreements ==
At institutional level, bilateral relations follow the lines of the "Strategic Partnership" action plan signed in 2010 and the guidelines established by the Italian-Brazilian Cooperation Council, which was held to examine the progress and challenges of bilateral collaboration in different fields of activities (political, economic and commercial relations, scientific and cultural projects, academic exchanges, industrial cooperation and defence).

== Cultural relations ==
Brazil ranked 11th out of 119 countries by number of students of Italian language. The total number is of 40,455 students of Italian descent in Brazil (60% of whom, precisely 25,276, are supported by the Ministry of Foreign Affairs and International Cooperation through the contributions paid for lectorship, and courses). The number of Brazilian students involved in language learning is increasing, so much so that many teachers themselves have confirmed the existence of a large number of students on the waiting list who cannot access the courses they hold. From 2013 to 2015, about 4,000 Brazilian students traveled abroad to Italy. In Brazil, there is a large and qualified presence of Italian researchers and teachers active in the Brazilian academic system. Over 800 bilateral agreements signed in recent years by Italian and Brazilian universities and research institutions have consolidated bi-directional academic mobility.

== Economic relations ==
Italy is now among the first investors in Brazil and is one of the major trading partners of the South American countries. Italian exports to Brazil are mainly concentrated in the sectors of industrial machinery and electrical equipment, chemicals, vehicles, trailers and semi-trailers and pharmaceuticals. In the Italian demand for Brazilian products, raw materials and products such as paper and cellulose, metals, coffee and soya are prevalent.

Many Italian companies invest in Brazil with a medium-long-term vision looking for the opportunities of this large market. The consequence was the development of a strong Italian entrepreneurial fabric in Brazil. According to data published by the Brazilian Ministry of Economy, since 2018 Italy has been the main investor among the signatory countries of the Memorandum of Understanding on Investment facilitation. About 1,000 Italian companies currently operate in Brazil and some of them play a leading role in strategic sectors of the economy, such as energy, telecommunications, infrastructure, steel and automotive.

== Resident diplomatic missions ==
of Brazil in Italy

- Rome (Embassy)
- Milan (Consulate-General)

of Italy in Brazil

- Brasília (Embassy)
- Belo Horizonte (Consulate-General)
- Curitiba (Consulate-General)
- Porto Alegre (Consulate-General)
- Rio de Janeiro (Consulate-General)
- São Paulo (Consulate-General)
- Recife (Consulate)

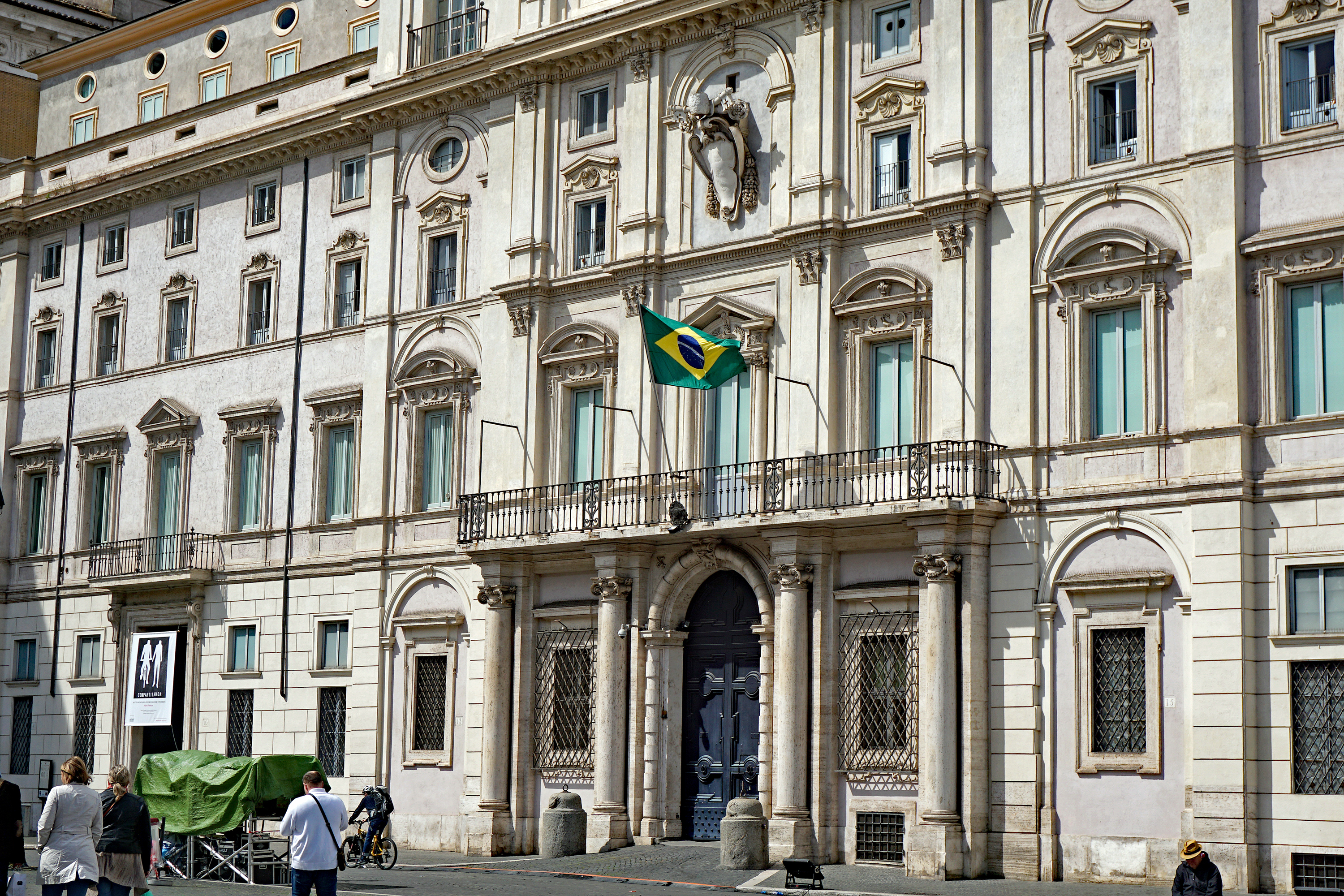
Embassy of Brazil in Rome
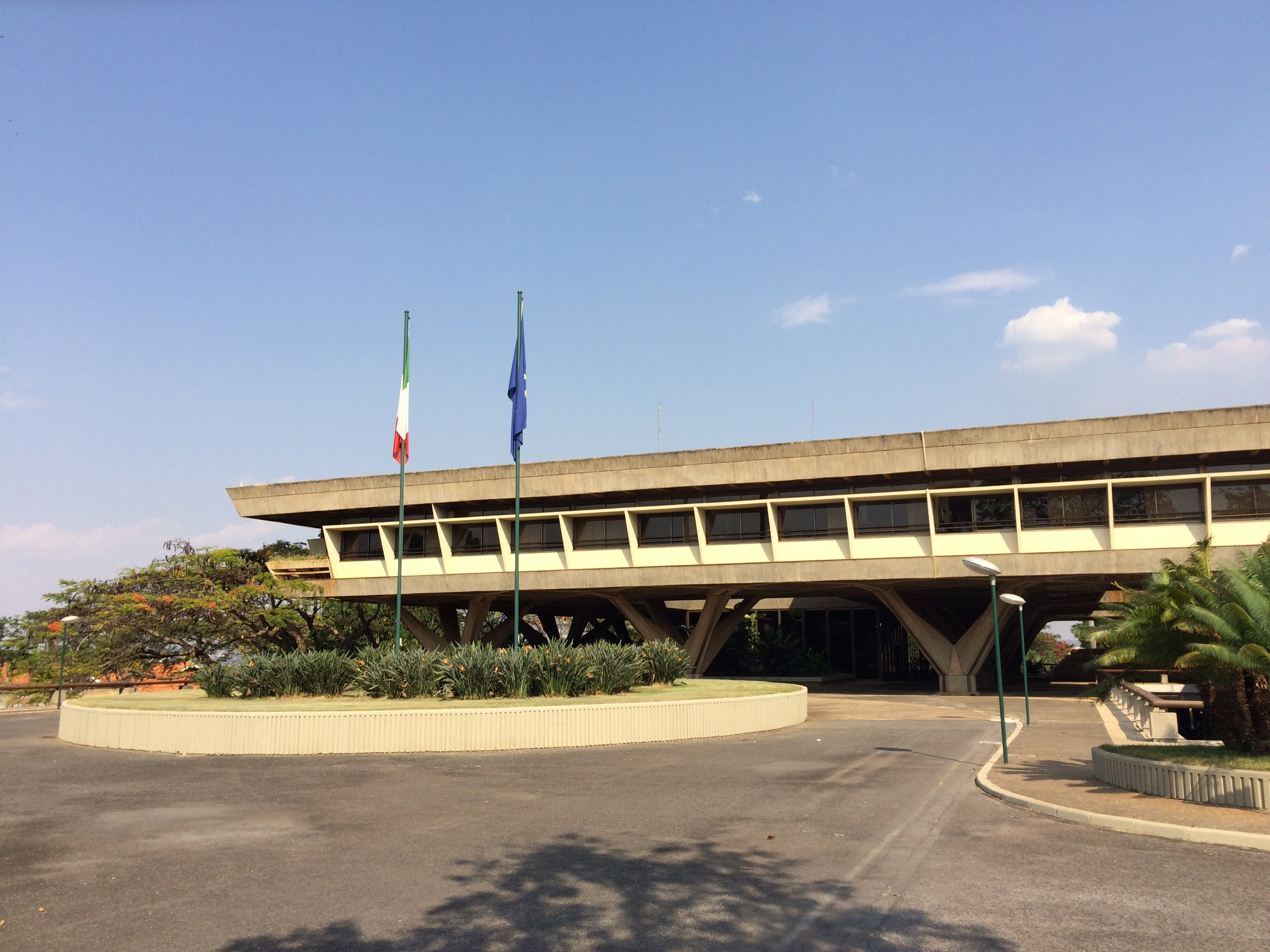
Embassy of Italy in Brasília

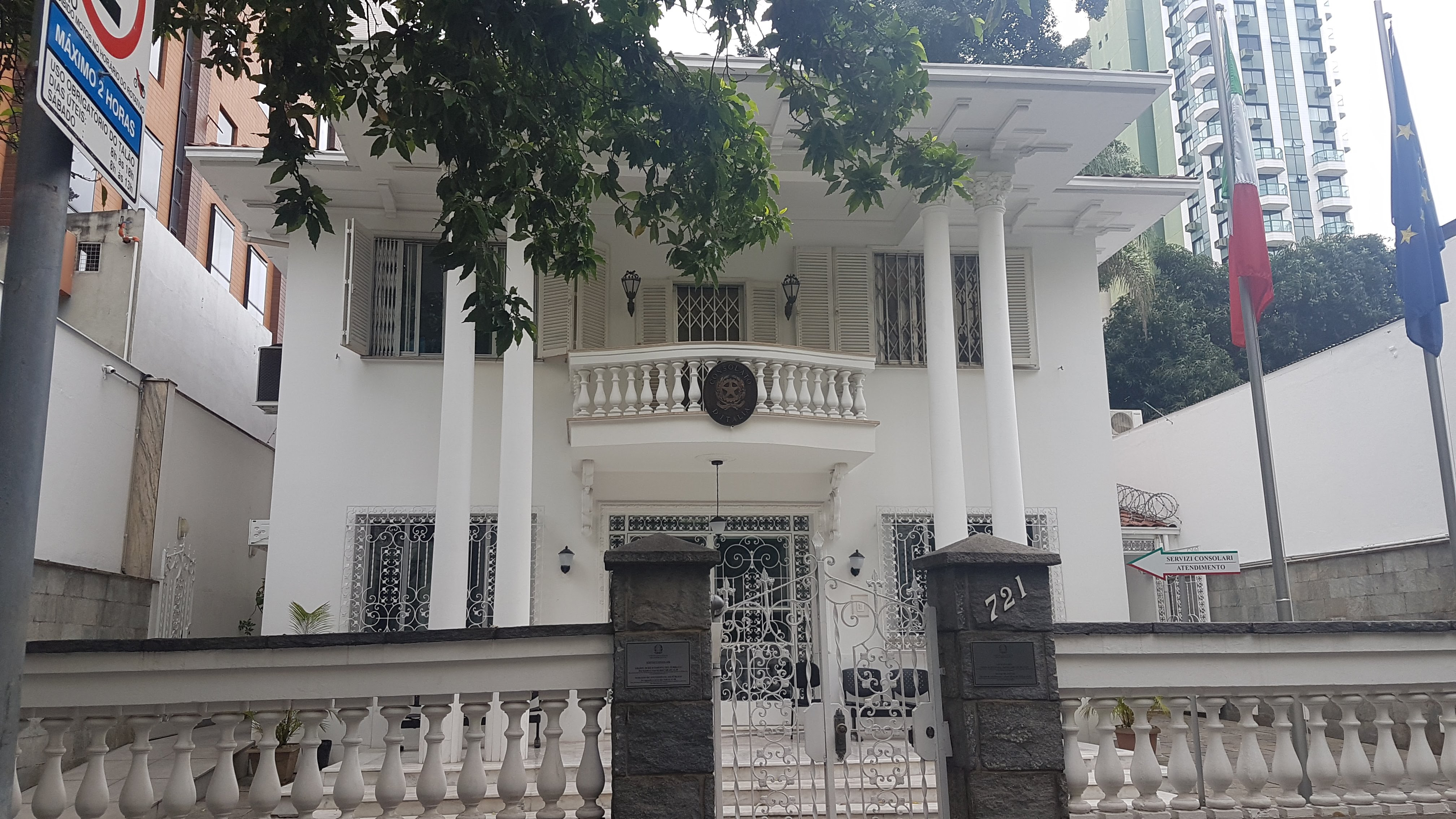
Consulate-General of Italy in Belo Horizonte

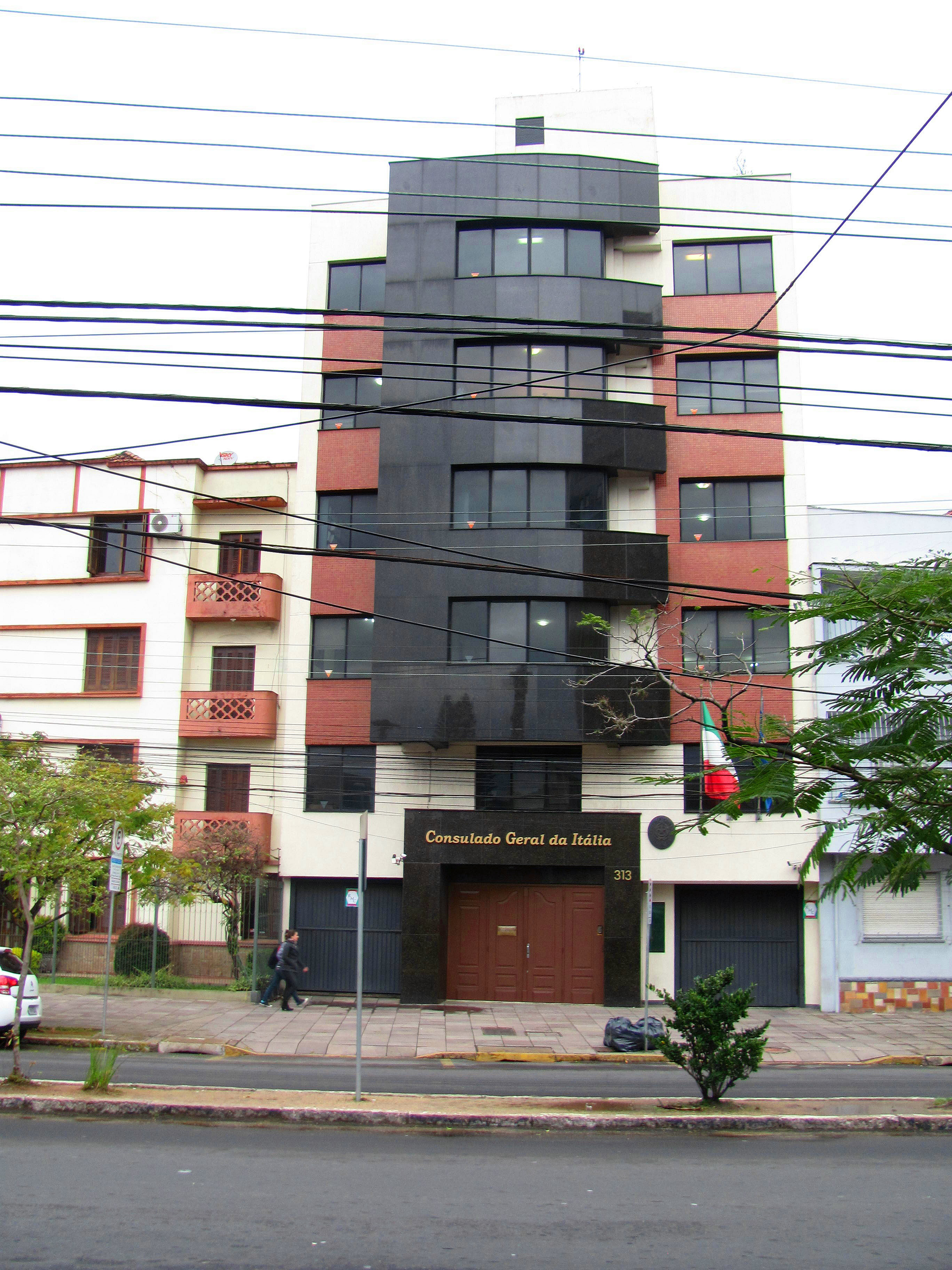
Consulate-General of Italy in Porto Alegre

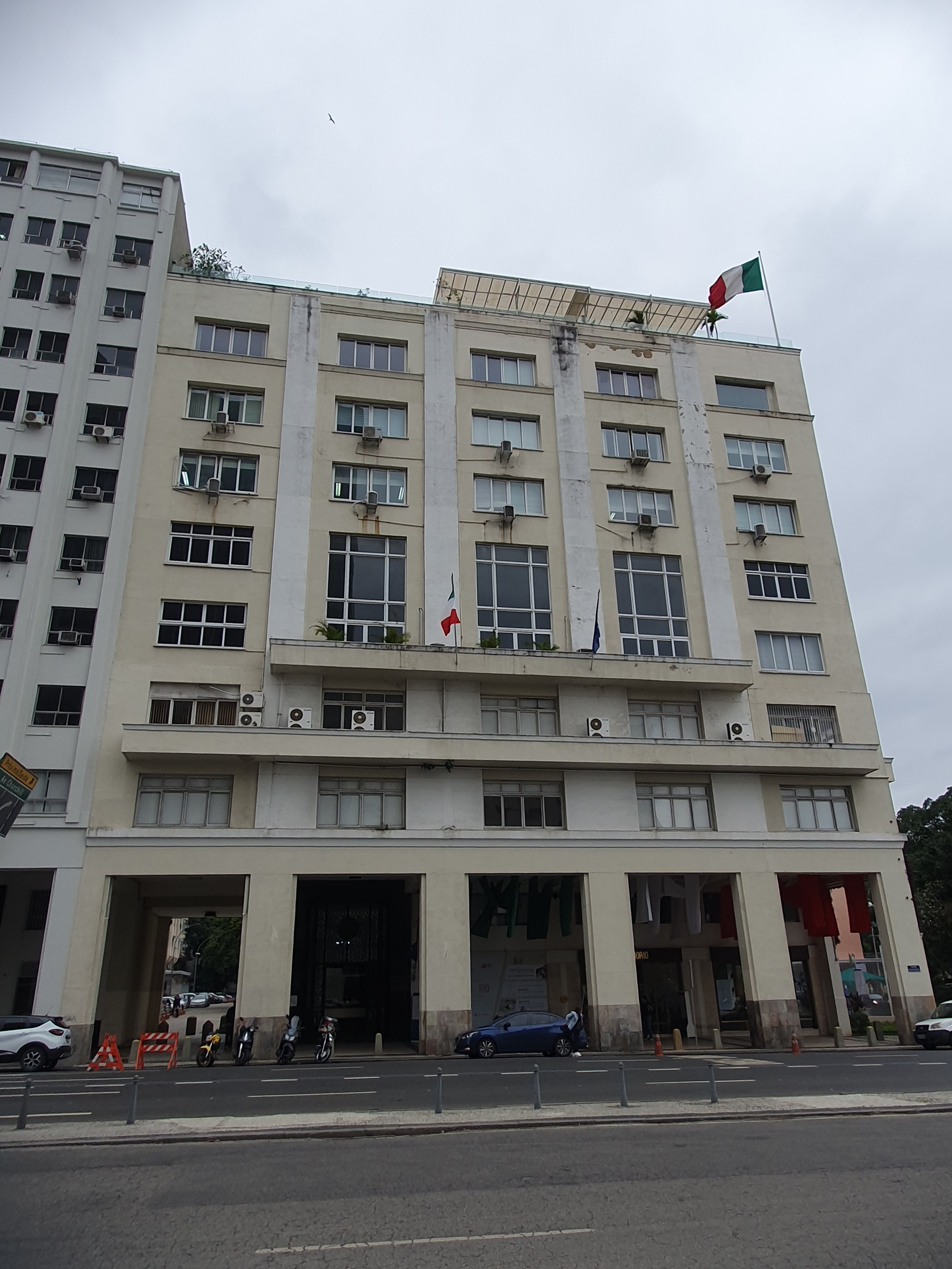
Consulate-General of Italy in Rio de Janeiro

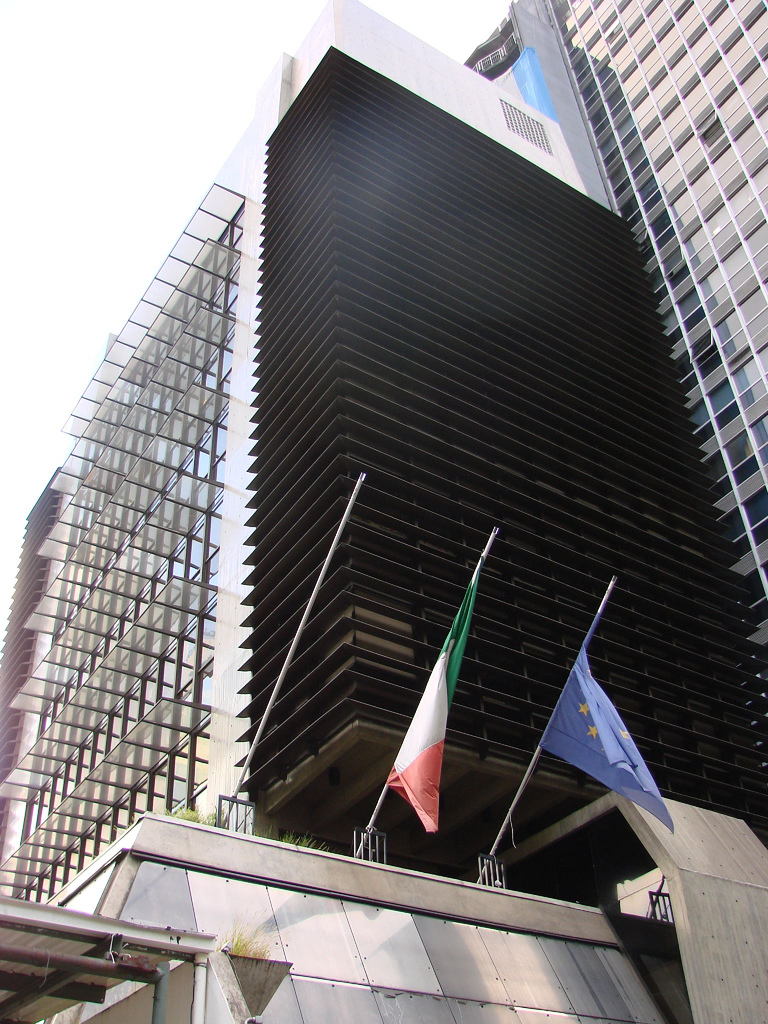
Consulate-General of Italy in São Paulo

== See also ==
- Brazil–Italy football rivalry
- Brazilian Expeditionary Force
- Brazilians in Italy (in Italian)
- Italian Brazilians
- Palazzo Pamphilj
- Brazil–EU relations
