= Raul Régis de Oliveira =

Brazilian diplomat (1874–1942)

Raul Régis de Oliveira OBE
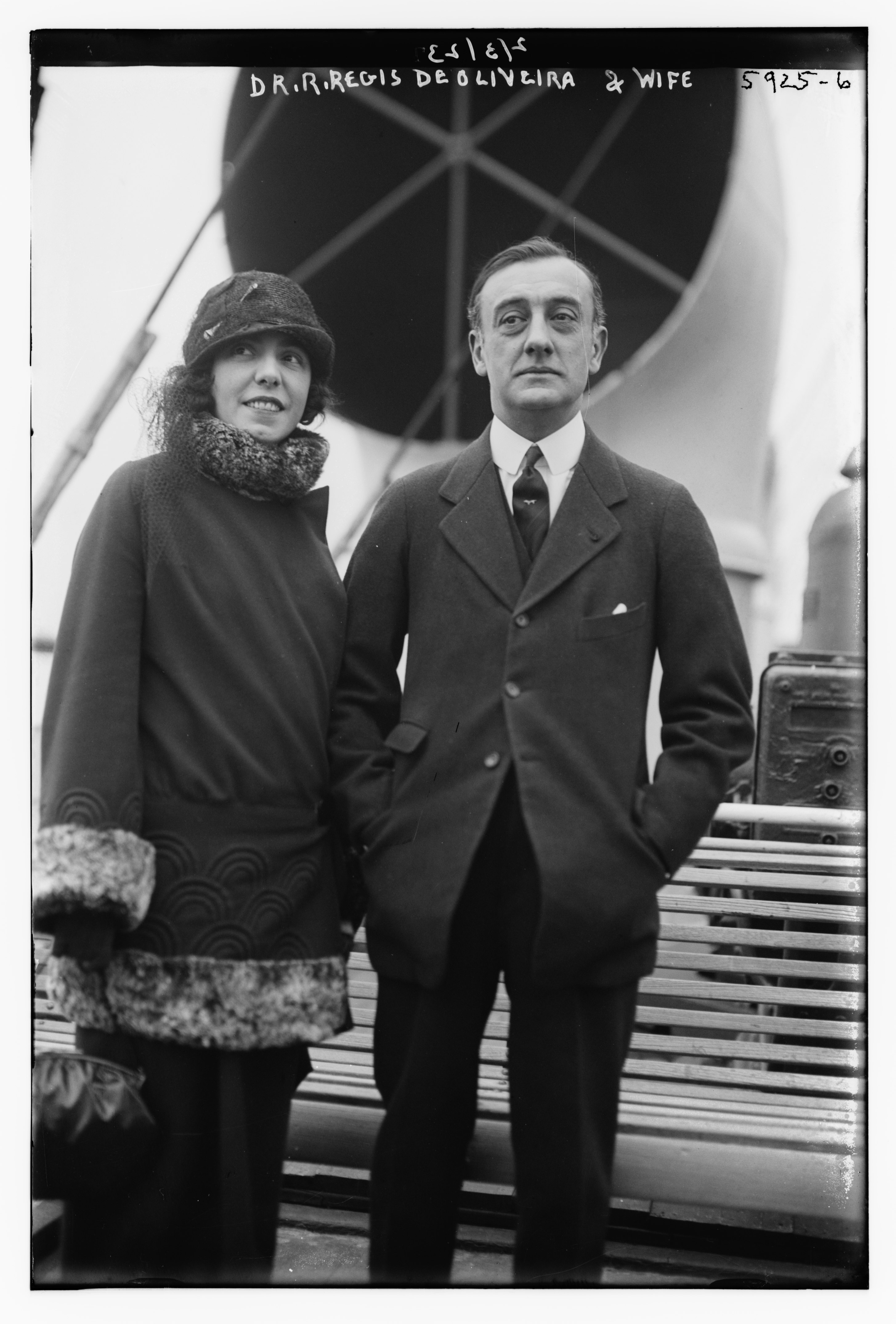
- Regis de Oliveira and his wife Gina de Araújo in 1923

Ambassador to the Court of St James’s
- In office April 29, 1925 – December 26, 1939
- Preceded by: Carlos Martins
- Succeeded by: Joaquim de Souza

Personal details
- Born: October 10, 1874 Paris
- Died: July 9, 1942 Rio de Janeiro
- Education: University of São Paulo
- Awards: See relevant section

Raul Régis de Oliveira (Paris, October 10, 1874 — Rio de Janeiro, July 9, 1942) was a Brazilian diplomat.

== Early life ==
Son of diplomat Francisco Régis de Oliveira, attaché to the Brazilian embassy in France, and Amélia Régis de Oliveira. His father was ambassador to the United Kingdom from 1905 to 1913 and, after moving to Portugal, died in Lisbon in 1915. He graduated from the Faculty of Law of the University of São Paulo. He began his diplomatic career in 1895.

== Diplomatic career ==
He began his diplomatic career in January of the following year as attaché to the Brazilian legation in Rome, where he remained until 1897. Promoted to second secretary, he was stationed in Washington D.C. from April 1902 and transferred to Vienna, then capital of the Austro-Hungarian Empire, a year later. He served in that city until July 1908, when he was transferred again to Rome, where he remained until March of the following year. That month, he rose to the position of first secretary.

From October 1910 to April 1912 he served in Lima as chargé d'affaires. In March 1913, he was promoted to minister-resident and sent to Havana, Cuba, where he remained until January 1916. He then traveled to Vienna, returning to Brazil in May of that year.

In January 1918, during the government of Venceslau Brás, he was appointed by Chancellor Nilo Peçanha as undersecretary of the Ministry of Foreign Affairs, remaining in the position until April 1919, during the government of Delfim Moreira. At the end of that year, after a brief stay in Paris, he went to The Hague, in the Netherlands, as envoy extraordinary and minister plenipotentiary. Promoted to ambassador in July 1922, he was then sent to Geneva, Switzerland, as a Brazilian delegate to the third assembly of the League of Nations. From February to October 1923, he was at the head of the Brazilian representation in Mexico.

His next mission was to head the Brazilian embassy in London, where he was assigned in April 1925. In February of the following year he traveled to Geneva in order to collaborate with ambassador Afrânio de Melo Franco in the negotiation process for Brazil's admission as a permanent member of the council of the League of Nations. The Brazilian candidacy had been presented shortly after the signing, in December 1925, of the Locarno Treaties, in which the great powers decided to expand that council in order to allow Germany's entry. The government of that country, however, opposed the creation of the other vacancy sought by Brazil, which, in retaliation, vetoed Germany's entry into the council. In June 1926, Brazil withdrew from the League of Nations.

He obtained from King Manuel II of Portugal an autographed gift of the volumes of the large, exquisitely illustrated catalogue, from the monarch's private library. He was a permanent member, with Max Fleiuss, of the Comité International des Sciences Historiques in Geneva.

He ended his assignment in London on December 26, 1939, shortly after the start of World War II, retiring from diplomatic service.

He was married to singer and songwriter Gina de Araújo, with whom he had a daughter.

== IHGB Member ==
He was admitted to the Brazilian Historic and Geographic Institute (IHGB) on October 29, 1874, and was elected honorary member on June 29, 1928. Along with his diplomatic activities, Régis de Oliveira represented the IHGB in historical science congresses held in Venice, Italy, from 1929 to 1933, being elected vice-president of the permanent commission on diplomatic history in the last year. In June 1933, he represented Brazil at the London Monetary Conference, which attempted to establish cooperation measures between nations for the recovery of the world economy, shaken by the 1929 crisis. The conference ended in complete failure, serving only, as Régis de Oliveira in a report, to clarify the differences between the main Western powers.

== Awards ==
- Belgium:
  - Order of Leopold II, Grand Cross
- France:
  - Legion of Honour
- Italy:
  - Order of Saints Maurice and Lazarus
- Netherlands:
  - Order of Orange-Nassau
- Poland:
  - Order of Polonia Restituta
- Portugal:
  - Order of the Immaculate Conception of Vila Viçosa
- Spain:
  - Order of Isabella the Catholic
- United Kingdom:
  - Order of the British Empire, Grand Cross
  - Royal Victorian Order

Political offices
Preceded by Carlos Magalhães de Azeredo	Minister Resident of Brazil in Cuba; June 2, 1913–June 4, 1914	Succeeded by Alfredo Carlos Alcoforado
Preceded by Luiz de Lima e Silva	Ambassador of Brazil to Austria–Hungary; March 30, 1915–May 8, 1916	Succeeded by Carlos Martins Pereira e Souza
Preceded by Frederico de Castello Branco Clark	Ambassador of Brazil to France; May 11, 1919–December 3, 1919	Succeeded by Gastão da Cunha
Preceded by Gustavo de Viana Kelsch	Ambassador of Brazil to the Netherlands; September 19, 1920–October 23, 1922	Succeeded by Gustavo de Viana Kelsch
Preceded by Jacome Baggi de Berenguer Cesar	Ambassador of Brazil to Mexico; February 10, 1923–October 14, 1923	Succeeded by Lourival de Guillobel
Preceded by Carlos Martins Pereira e Souza	Ambassador to the Court of St James’s; April 29, 1925–December 26, 1939	Succeeded by Joaquim de Souza Leâo Filho
