= Castagneto (disambiguation) =

Castagneto may refer to:

== Places in Italy ==
Municipalities (comuni)

- Castagneto Carducci, in the Province of Livorno
- Castagneto Po, in the Metropolitan City of Turin

Civil parishes (frazioni)

- Castagneto, in the municipality of Cava de' Tirreni, Province of Salerno
- Castagneto (Teramo), in the municipality of Teramo

== Personalities ==
- Donna Marella Caracciolo di Castagneto (b. 1927), Italian-American designer
- Don Carlo Caracciolo di Castagneto (1925-2008), Italian editor
