= House of Caracciolo =

Aristocratic family

- Country: Italy Former countries: Kingdom of Naples; Spanish Empire; Two Sicilies; Kingdom of Italy; Papal States; Holy Roman Empire
- Founded: 10th century
- Founder: Teodoro Caracciolo
- Titles: List: Prince of Avellino; Prince of Cellamare; Prince of Forino; Prince of Marano; Prince of Melissano; Prince of Ripa; Prince of Santobuono; Prince of Scanno; Prince of Spinoso; Prince of Torchiarolo; Prince of Torella; Prince of Sant'Angelo dei Lombardi; Prince of Torre dell'Isola; Prince of Villamaina; Duke of Airola; Duke of Atripalda; Duke of Barrea; Duke of Belcastro; Duke of Resigano; Duke of Bernalda; Duke of Casamassima; Duke of Castel di Sangro; Duke of Castelluccio; Duke of Gesso; Duke of Girifalco; Duke of Laurino; Duke of Melito; Duke of Montesardo; Duke of Frattaminore; Duke of San Vito Chietino; Duke of Minturno; Duke of Vietri sul Mare; Marquess of Alfedena; Marquess of Amorosi; Marquess of Barisciano; Marquess of Cervinara; Marquess of Gioiosa Ionica; Marquess of Guardia Perticara; Marquess of Laterza; Marquess of Mesoraca; Marquess of San Marco dei Cavoti; Marquess of San Severino; Marquess of Santeramo in Colle; Marquess of Taviano; Count of Castelrosso; Count of Melissano; Count of Nicastro; Count of Noicattaro; Count of Serino; Count of Trivento; Baron of Scontrone; Baron of Villetta Barrea; Lord of Accettura; Lord of Gorgoglione; Lord of Maida
- Cadet branches: Caracciolo Rossi; Caracciolo Pisquizi; Caracciolo del Sole; House of Carafa

The House of Caracciolo (Italian: Casata dei Caracciolo [kaˈrattʃolo]; Latin: Domus Caracciolo) is a prominent aristocratic noble family that originated in the city of Naples. The Caracciolos are considered one of the most important families in the history of the Kingdom of Naples, and also held relevant posts in the Catholic Church, Spanish Empire, and the Holy Roman Empire.

== History ==
The house boasted a mythical Byzantine origin, however, the first documented mention of the family date back to the 10th century with the progenitor Teodoro Caracciolo, who was reported in ancient documents as Theodorus Caracziolus, of which only archival information is available; he was buried together with his wife Urania in the Cathedral of the Assumption of Mary in Naples. He is reported to have died on 20 March 976, the date of a document in which it is learned that in this period his daughter Theodonanda made a donation to the Monastery of Saints Sergius and Bacchus in Naples.

At the time of the Duchy of Naples, the family enjoyed nobility during the reign of the Sergian dynasty, benefiting from special privileges granted by Sergius VII of Naples. The family then divided into numerous lines, including the ancient lines of the likes of Caracciolo Canella, Caracciolo Ugot, Caracciolo Viola, and Caracciolo Ciccola, then into the lines of the likes of the del Sole, Bianchi, Rossi, and Pisquizi. Specifically, Riccardo Caracciolo, son of Landolfo, who lived in the early 12th century, was the progenitor of the Caracciolo Rossi. Caracciolo Pisquizi Filippo, also son of Landolfo, was the progenitor of the branch of the Caracciolo del Sole and that of the Caracciolo di Pisciotta.

In 1869, the family was enrolled in the Libro d'Oro, the Golden Book of the Italian nobility. Thanks to the great importance of the Caracciolo family, most of the most important events of the Kingdom of Naples had various members of the family as protagonists, sometimes even on opposing fronts.

The family has played a pivotal role in the development of the Catholic Church, with family members holding positions as bishops and cardinals. One notable member of the family who was involved with the church was Saint Francis Caracciolo.

The family name is still attributed to the Palazzo Caracciolo in Naples, a grand palace dating to a Renaissance-period renovation of a medieval palace sharing the same foundation. Today, Palazzo Caracciolo is a luxury hotel.

== Notable members ==
- Francesco Caracciolo (died 1316), chancellor of the University of Paris
- Landolfo Caracciolo (died 1351), Franciscan theologian and archbishop of Amalfi
- Riccardo Caracciolo (c. 1320–1395), one of two rival Grand Masters of the Knights Hospitaller
- Giovanni Caracciolo (c. 1372–1432), minister of the Kingdom of Naples and favourite of Queen Joanna II who was often called Sergianni
- Marino Caracciolo (1468–1538), cardinal and diplomat
- Tommaso Caracciolo (1478–1546), Archbishop of Capua (1536–1546), Bishop of Trivento (1502–1540), and Bishop of Capaccio (1523–1531)
- Francis Caracciolo (1563-1608), Catholic priest and saint, cofounder of Clerics Regular Minor
- Pasquale Caracciolo (1566–1608), writer and horsemanship expert
- Tommaso Caracciolo, Count of Roccarainola (1572–1631), Spanish field marshal
- Carlo Andrea Caracciolo (1584–1646), 2nd Marquis of Torrecuso, Spanish military commander during the Thirty Years' War
- Girolamo Maria Caracciolo (1617–1662), 3rd Marqués de Torrecuso, Governor of Navarre, and soldier from a branch in Spain since the 16th century
- Tommaso Caracciolo (1636–1637), Archbishop of Taranto
- Carmine Nicolao Caracciolo (1671–1726), Viceroy of the Spanish Kingdom of Peru from a branch in Spain since the 16th century
- Tommaso Caracciolo (1687–1689), Bishop of Gerace
- Francesco Caracciolo (1752–1799), admiral and revolutionary.
- Filippo Giudice Caracciolo (1785–1844), Archbishop of Naples (1833–1844)
- Mario Caracciolo di Melito (1883–1958), Italian cavalry officer and American actor known as Mario Carillo
- Miriam Caracciolo di Melito (1888–1966), American socialite and wife of Mario Caracciolo di Melito
- Giuseppe Caracciolo (1892–1975), cinematographer
- Rudolf Caracciola (1901–1959), racing driver from a branch in Germany since the 17th century
- Filippo Caracciolo (1903–1965), 8th Prince of Castagneto, 3rd Duke di Melito
- Franco Caracciolo (1920–1999), actor and conductor
- Carlo Caracciolo (1925–2008), 9th Prince of Castagneto, 4th Duke of Melito, newspaper publisher, and founder of Gruppo Editoriale L'Espresso
- Marella Caracciolo (1927–2019), Princess of Castagneto, art collector, designer, and widow of Gianni Agnelli
- Nicola Caracciolo (1931–2020), 10th Prince of Castagneto, 5th Duke di Melito, journalist, and historian
- Niccolo d'Ardia Caracciolo (1941–1989), painter from a branch in Ireland since the 20th century

== Bibliography ==
- Cancelliere, Maria Pina (2012). Lo Stato feudale dei Caracciolo di Torella: poteri, istituzioni e rapporti economico-sociali nel Mezzogiorno moderno. Avellino: Terebinto Editore. ISBN 978-88-97-48907-8.
