= Filippo Caracciolo =

Italian nobleman and politician (1903–1965)

- 8th Prince of Castagneto; 3rd Duke of Melito
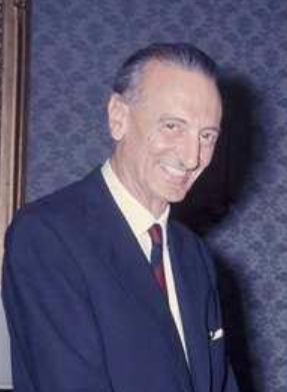
- Caracciolo in 1965
- Born: Prince Filippo Caracciolo di Castagneto; 4 March 1903; Naples, Italy
- Died: 16 July 1965 (aged 62); Rome, Italy
- Family: House of Caracciolo
- Spouse: Margaret Clarke (m. 1925; died 1955)
- Issue: Carlo Caracciolo, 9th Prince of Castagneto, 4th Duke of Melito; Princess Marella Caracciolo; Nicola Caracciolo, 10th Prince of Castagneto, 5th Duke of Melito
- Father: Nicola Caracciolo, 7th Prince of Castagneto, 2nd Duke of Melito
- Mother: Meralda Mele Barrese
- Occupation: Diplomat; politician

Filippo Caracciolo, 8th Prince of Castagneto, 3rd Duke of Melito (4 March 1903 – 16 July 1965), was an Italian nobleman and anti-fascist politician who served in the National Liberation Committee (CLN) and the second government of Pietro Badoglio. His assiduous participation in the development of the automotive and tourism sectors earned him the gold medal for meritorious service to education and culture.

Born into the House of Caracciolo, a noble family dating back to the Kingdom of Naples, Caracciolo graduated and began a diplomatic career in the 1930s. During the Bari Congress, which was held in 1944 by the CLN, he was appointed secretary of the executive council and subsequently served in Badoglio's government. He was secretary of the Action Party (PdA) from 1943 to 1945 and deputy secretary general of the Council of Europe from 1949 to 1954.

Between the end of World War II and the early 1950s, alongside his political commitments, Caracciolo held roles related to national development and the protection of the country's landscape and cultural heritage, and held additional positions in various organisations and associations. He was also the first Italian president of the International Automobile Federation (FIA) and was the author of several works of journalism and non-fiction.

== Early life and education ==
Caracciolo was born on 4 March 1903 in Naples, during the Kingdom of Italy period, into the Italian nobility as a member the House of Caracciolo. He was known with the honorific of Don as a result of his nobility origins (his father was Nicola Caracciolo, 7th Prince of Castagneto, 2nd Duke of Melito, who married Meralda Mele Barrese), including being the 8th Prince of Castagneto, the 3rd Duke of Melito, and an hereditary patrician of Naples from an old noble Neapolitan family dating back to the Kingdom of Naples. He graduated in political and commercial sciences, holding a doctorate in economics and social sciences.

== Career ==
In 1934, Caracciolo assumed diplomatic positions in Turkey, Switzerland, and Strasbourg, owing to his multi-lingual ability. During the Fascist Italy period, he took part in the Italian resistance movement and hosted exiled anti-fascists, including Ugo La Malfa. After the fall of the fascist regime in Italy on 25 July 1943, La Malfa returned from England to live at Caracciolo's house in Rome. He had previously clandestinely hosted La Malfa in Switzerland.

During a congress in Bari on 28–29 January 1944, Caracciolo became the executive secretary of the CLN, and later became the undersecretary of the Italian Ministry of Foreign Affairs in the second Badoglio government. During this time, he helped overcome objections for the Italian Communist Party (PCI) to join the government. Between September 1943 and September 1945, Caracciolo was appointed secretary of the PdA, along with Pasquale Schiano, Adolfo Omodeo, and Ferruccio Parri, who was the military commander in Northern Italy, and also served as general-secretary of the Council of Europe from 1949 to 1954.

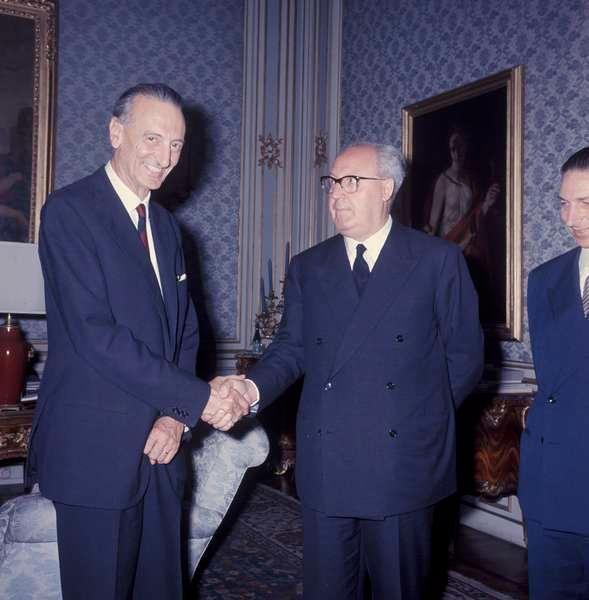
Caracciolo with Italian President Giuseppe Saragat on 15 June 1965

During his career, Caraccioli held many posts, including as vice president of the Tourism and Automobile Organisation (OTA), member of the board of directors of Italian Association of the Automotive Industry (ANFIA), and president or board member of numerous other organisations, including SARA Assicurazioni, L'Editrice dell'Automobile, Cofige, Sicreo, and Sacop. He also served as editor of the Automobile Club of Italy's social magazine from 1948 to 1950. In addition to a journalist career, he was the author of several literary works, such as I canti di ognuno, Il passaggio di Irene, I trionfi, Il vivaio, and Napoli 1943-1945.

Caracciolo was a supporter of motorsport. During his presidency at Automobile Club of Italy, the country underwent a transformation as motorisation became a mass phenomenon. He supported major road safety education initiatives, for which he was awarded the gold medal for meritorious service to education and culture by the Ministry of Education. He also championed and supported motor racing in the tradition of the Automobile Club of Italy.

Caracciolo was a special ambassador of the Automobile Club of Italy, which he was able to keep open and retain its FIA membership after World War II. During this time, he was president of several international organisations, such as Italia Nostra and Europa Nostra, and also served as vice-president of FIA. In 1963, Caracciolo was appointed president of FIA, a job he held until his death in 1965; in doing so, he became the first Italian to hold the post, which had been always held by French, allowing the FIA to bolster its claim as an international body. His candidacy was supported by his predecessor, Count Hadelin de Liedekerke Beaufort. Caracciolo shared his time as president of FIA between Rome and Paris, and his premature death led to an unfulfilled presidency.

== Personal life and death ==
On 8 January 1925 in Florence, Caracciolo married Margaret Clarke (1898–1955), the heiress of a well-known family of whiskey producers from Peoria, Illinois. During their marriage, which ended with the death of Clarke in 1955, they had three children. Carlo Caracciolo (1925–2008), who inherited the nobility titles, was the founder of the Gruppo Editoriale L'Espresso, while Marella Agnelli (1927–2019) became an art collector, socialite, style icon, and wife of Fiat S.p.A. chairman Gianni Agnelli (1921–2003), and Nicola Caracciolo (1931–2020) was a journalist, historian, and environmental activist. He died in Rome on 16 July 1965, less than two years into his term as FIA president.

Caracciolo is claimed as the biological father of the Italian film producer Ettore Rosboch von Wolkenstein (born 1945), the son of Baroness Elisabeth Jaworski von Wolkenstein (1915–1959), who at the time of his birth had been a widow to Nobile Ettore Bernardo Rosboch (1893–1944). Rosboch von Wolkenstein's father, who was born in 1893, served during the Fascist Italy period as Undersecretary of State to the Ministry of Finance and died in 1944. Rosboch von Wolkenstein married Lilia Smecchia (born 1947). Their daughter, Elisabetta Maria Rosboch von Wolkenstein (born 1987), married Prince Amedeo of Belgium (born 1986), the hereditary Archduke of Austria-Este, with three children, and as a result became known as Princess Elisabetta of Belgium. Rosboch von Wolkenstein produced the only album by Mario Schifano's Le Stelle band during the late 1960s in what was one of the first examples of Italian underground music, and most notably was one of the producers of the 1984 fantasy comedy film Nothing Left to Do But Cry, which starred Roberto Benigni and Massimo Troisi. While some consider this claim only a suspicion, others argue it was certain that Rosboch von Wolkenstein was Caracciolo's son.

== See also ==
- Agnelli family
