= Gae Aulenti =

Italian architect and designer (1927–2012)

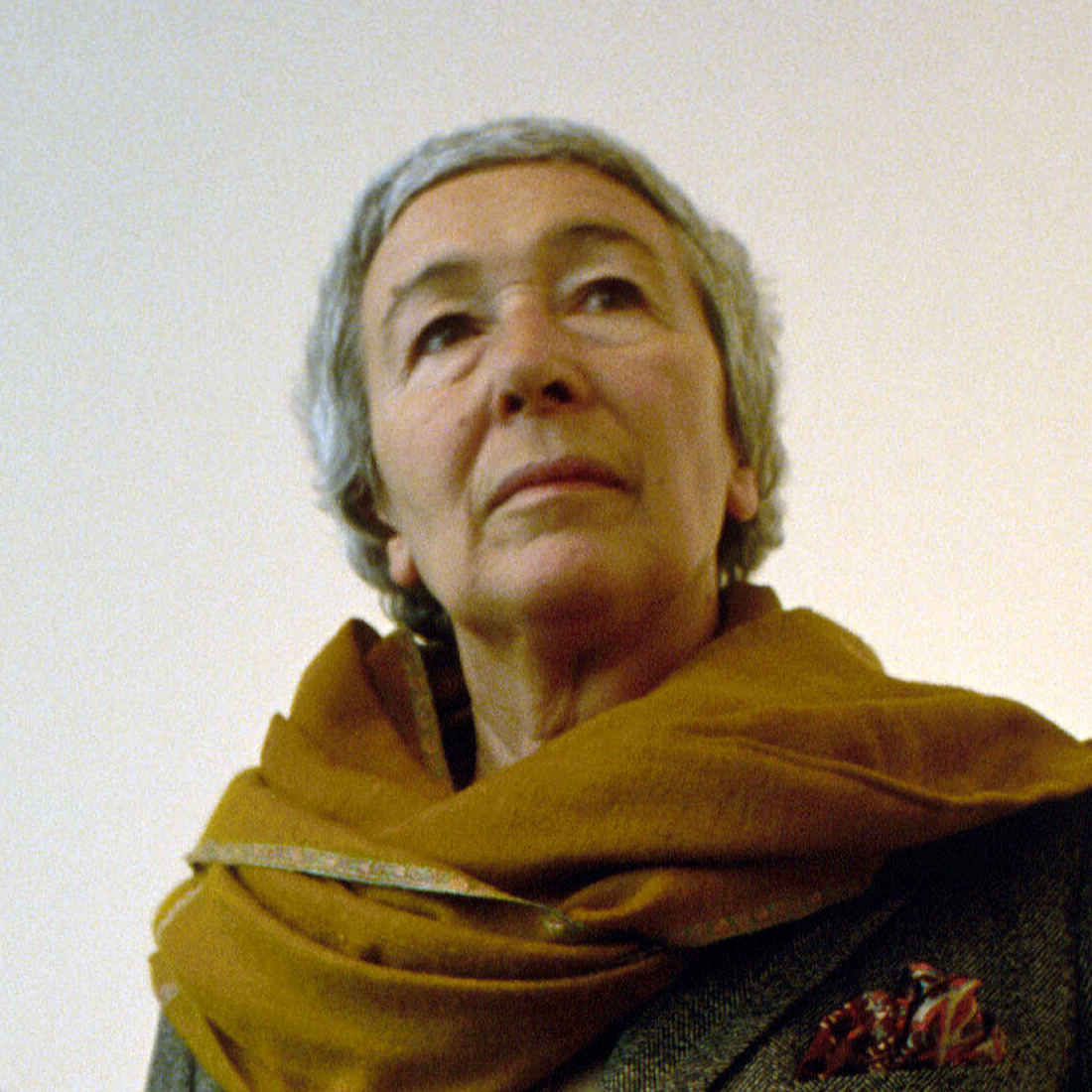
- Aulenti in 1986
- Born: Gaetana Emilia Aulenti; 4 December 1927; Palazzolo dello Stella, Italy
- Died: 31 October 2012 (aged 84); Milan, Italy
- Education: Milan School of Architecture of the Polytechnic University
- Known for: Architectural design, theatre design, lighting design
- Movement: Modernism, Post-modernism
- Spouse: Francesco Buzzi (m. 1959 – div.)
- Awards: Praemium Imperiale (Japan), Premio speciale della cultura (Italy), Commandeur, Order des Artes et Letters (France), and others
- Memorials: Piazza Gae Aulenti, Milan

Gaetana "Gae" Emilia Aulenti (pronounced [ˈɡaːe auˈlɛnti]; 4 December 1927 – 31 October 2012) was an Italian architect and designer. Aulenti began her career in the early 1950s, establishing herself as one of the few prominent female architects in post-war Italy.

Although modernism was the predominant international architectural style throughout much of the 20th century, Aulenti stepped away from its tenets to embrace neo-liberty, an architectural and design theory which upheld the relevance of tradition and artistic freedom within the modern aesthetic.

Throughout her career, Aulenti applied her knowledge and broad expertise to a wide range of projects spanning from furniture, lighting, and product design to interiors and exhibition design, theatre stage sets, historical preservation and large-scale architectural projects.

Aulenti is widely acknowledged for transforming the Gare d'Orsay to the Musée d'Orsay. She was awarded the Chevalier de la Legion d' Honneur and the Ordine al Merito della Repubblica Italiana.

== Early life and education ==
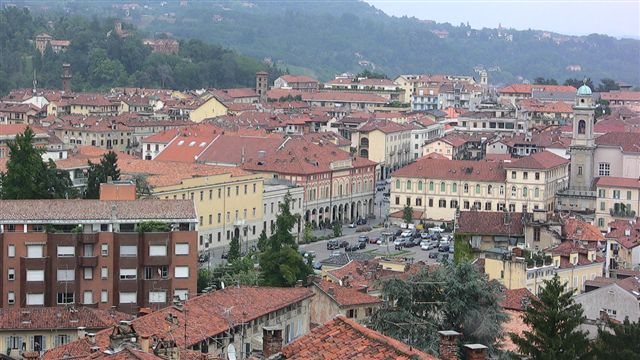
Biella, Italy

Aulenti was born in Palazzolo dello Stella in the Friuli region of northeast Italy to Aldo Aulenti, an accountant and his wife, Virginia Gioia, a school teacher. The Aulenti family, with ancestral origins in Calabria, Apulia and Campania, included her paternal grandfather, who served as a magistrate, and her maternal grandfather, who was a physician.

When Aulenti was a child, her family moved to Biella, in the Piedmont region in northern Italy. Aulenti attended a visual arts high-school in Florence; however, during World War II, she was compelled to return to Biella where she continued her studies privately. Reflecting on her life, Aulenti remarked that she was acquainted with several partisans in Piedmont, who placed their trust in her. She would carry out small missions for the Allies while pretending to be on a leisurely outing to the countryside.

Although Aulenti initially studied visual arts, she saw an opportunity to contribute to the rebuilding of Italy and in 1948 she enrolled in the architectural program at the Polytechnic University of Milan. Other alumni from Aulenti's generation at the Polytechnic included Anna Castelli Ferrieri, Franca Stagi, and Cini Boeri.

Milan was attractive to students, like Aulenti, because it had been an open city during World War II and was rich with culture and intellectual life. Among Milanese cultural figures of that time, Aulenti recalled the film-maker, Luchino Visconti and the author, Elio Vittorini (whom she met) but also international figures such as Walter Gropius, Le Corbusier and Frank Lloyd Wright.

Aulenti married fellow Polytechnic alumnus Francesco Buzzi in 1959. They had a daughter, Giovanna Buzzi but divorced three years later. Giovanna was close to her mother and saw her as a mentor. Aulenti's granddaughter also became an architect.

== Architectural and design philosophy ==
Approximately one third of Milan's built structures were destroyed in the hostilities of World War II. The post-war reconstruction of Milan (part of the Italian economic miracle) involved large architectural and urban design projects. Architects faced the problem of reconstructing a city of renowned historical and cultural city edifices in a way that acknowledged modern architectural materials, techniques and style. It was in this setting that Aulenti began her career.

Aulenti said,

I am convinced that architecture is tied to the polis, it is an art of the city, of the foundation, and as such it is necessarily related and conditioned by the context in which it is born. Place, time, and culture create that architecture, instead of another.

From 1955 to 1965, Aulenti was a graphic designer at Casabella-continuità, a Milanese magazine focussed on avant-garde architecture and design. Working under editor-in-chief Ernesto Nathan Rogers, Aulenti examined neo-liberty, a novel Italian architectural theory. Neo-liberty posited that there is a continuity between historical and modern architectural styles rather than an end of one and the beginning of another and that elements from the past can be used to enhance contemporary design. This is counter to modernism which eschews ornamentation and places function before form. Aulenti explained,

The architecture in which I would like to recognize myself derives from three fundamental capacities of an aesthetic and not a moral order. The first is the analytical one, in the sense that we must be able to recognize the continuity of both conceptual and physical urban and geographical traces, as specific essences of architecture. The second is the synthetic one, that is to know how to operate the necessary synthesis in order to render priority and evident the principles of the architecture. The third is the prophetic one, typical of artists, poets and inventors.

Aulenti's interpretation of neo-liberty is exemplified in her first furniture piece, the Sgarsul chair (1962), crafted from bent beech wood with a slung leather seat containing soft polyurethane padding. The design of the Sgarsul chair draws inspiration from Michael Thonet's Rocking Chair No. 1 (1862). In her later life, Aulenti said of her work,

I have always tried to make my work unclassifiable, not to accept abstract rules, not to confine myself to specializations, but instead to deal with different disciplines. The theatre, for example, to be able to analyze literary and musical texts. The design of objects as a complementary world to architectural spaces. Architecture as a basic passion where theory and practice must intertwine. I believe architecture is an interdisciplinary intellectual work, a work in which building science and art are extremely integrated.

== Career ==
=== Industrial design ===
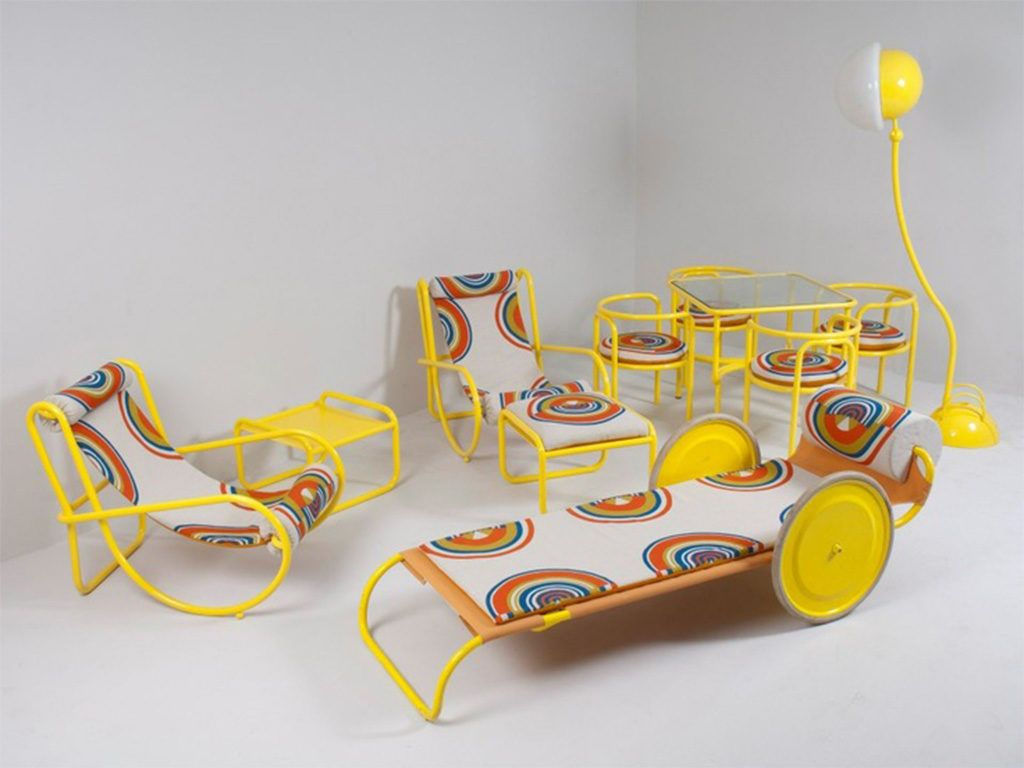
Locus solus garden set, 1964

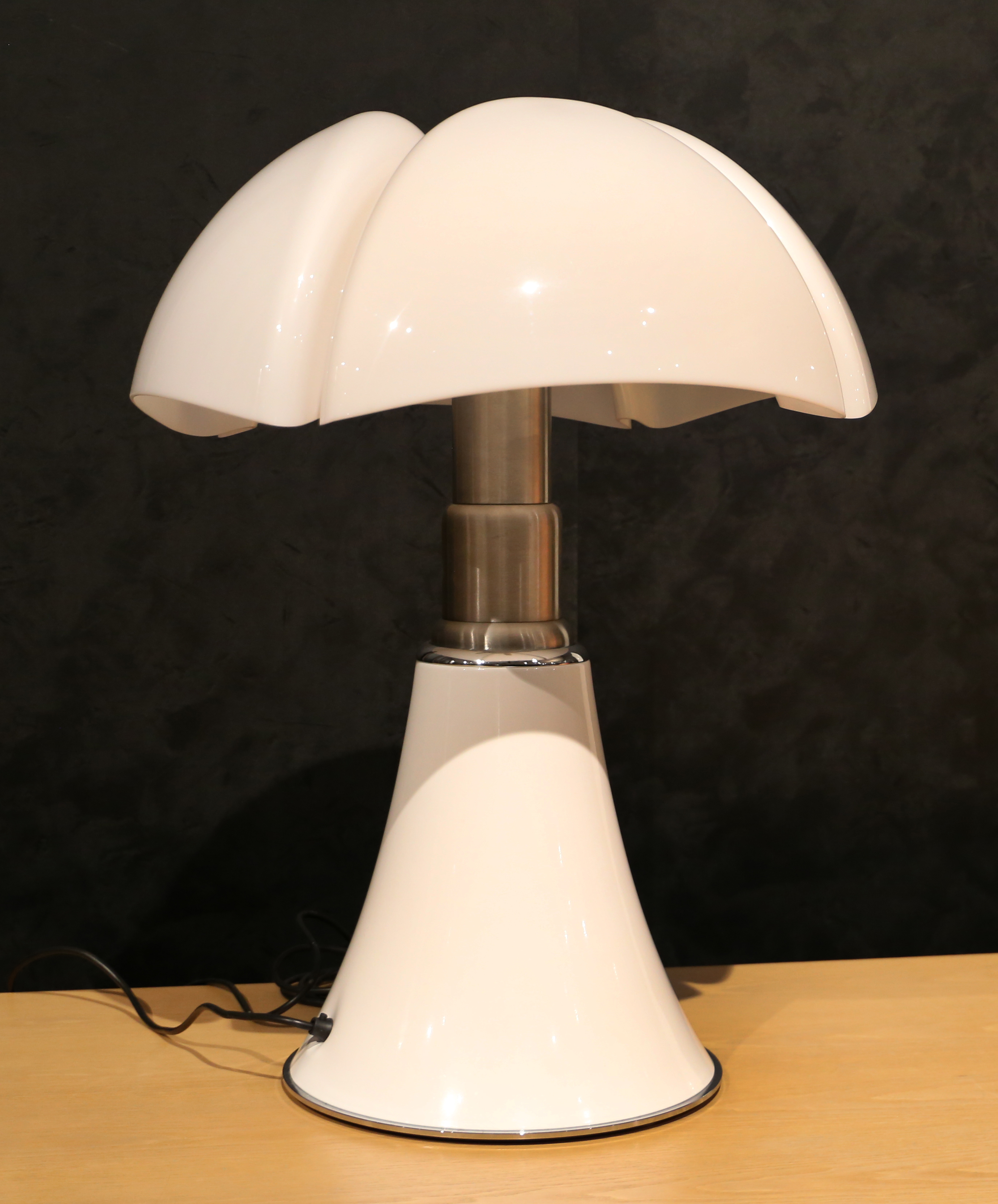
Pipstrello lamp, 1965

Aulenti had a prolific career in industrial design.

Her Locus Solus furniture collection, introduced in 1964, was inspired by the country estate featured in Raymond Roussel's 1912 novel of the same name. The collection comprised chairs, a table, an adjustable lamp, a sofa, a sun lounger, and a bench, all manufactured from tubular cold-formed steel by the Poltronova furniture company. The Locus Solus collection was used as set decoration in the film, La Piscine (1969). In 2023, a replica collection in off-white and yellow was produced for commercial sale.

Lamps designed by Aulenti were notable for their style, innovation and function. For example, the Giova lamp (1964) designed for Fontana Arte, a lighting and furniture manufacturer, was a centripetal object that functioned as a lamp, a planter, an aroma diffuser and an objet d'art. The Pipistrello lamp (1965) was another of Aulenti's early yet enduring designs. The lamp featured a neck that could extend by 20 cm, allowing it to be positioned on either a table or the floor. It was manufactured by Elio Martinelli, the founder of the Martinelli Luce lighting company, using poly(methyl acrylate) molding. The Ruspa table lamp (1967) was a modular group of four lights. Direct light and indirect light from imbedded reflectors was controlled by angling of lamp's head. The Ruspa was unconventional as it was crafted in lacquered aluminium instead of plastic.

Olivetti, the maker of precision office machines, engaged Aulenti to design their showrooms in Paris (1967) and Buenos Aires (1968). Office machines, such as typewriters, were displayed on structures of white laminate steps accented by radiating spokes of dark polished wood. This design drew inspiration from the steps of a piazza and the repeating triangular patterns found in traditional African arts and crafts. In the centre of the display, a tall red structure, resembling a space capsule, represented the future. Lighting was provided by Aulenti's Girasole floor lamp in which nine semicircles of clear plastic were set around a central spine and a concealed light bulb. Aulenti describes her work for Olivetti as the pivotal starting point of her international career.

In 1968, Aulenti designed showrooms in Turin, Zurich and Brussels for the car manufacturer, Fiat. The cars were showcased single file, each on an inclined metal platform set against mirrored walls. The customer explored a central viewing point, while the cars were arranged, as though driving on a race track, around them. Furniture for the show room was produced from Aulenti's designs by the Kartell furniture company. At the time, Kartell was experimenting with injection moulding.

Aulenti collaborated with the French fashion house Louis Vuitton to design a watch accompanied by a matching pen and silk scarf. The design, known as the "Monterey" (1988) was released in two versions. The Monterey I featured elements reminiscent of an elaborately decorated pocket watch while the Monterey II stood out with its sleek black polished ceramic case. In 2025 Louis Vuitton relaunched the Monterey model inspired by the design created by Gae Aulenti.

Aulenti also designed a line of porcelain sanitary ware, which she called, the "Orsay" collection (1996).

=== Architectural design ===
==== Musée d'Orsay ====
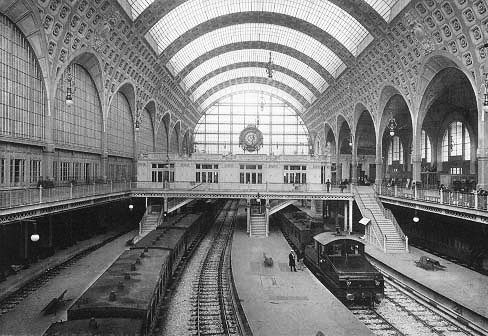
Gare d'Orsay

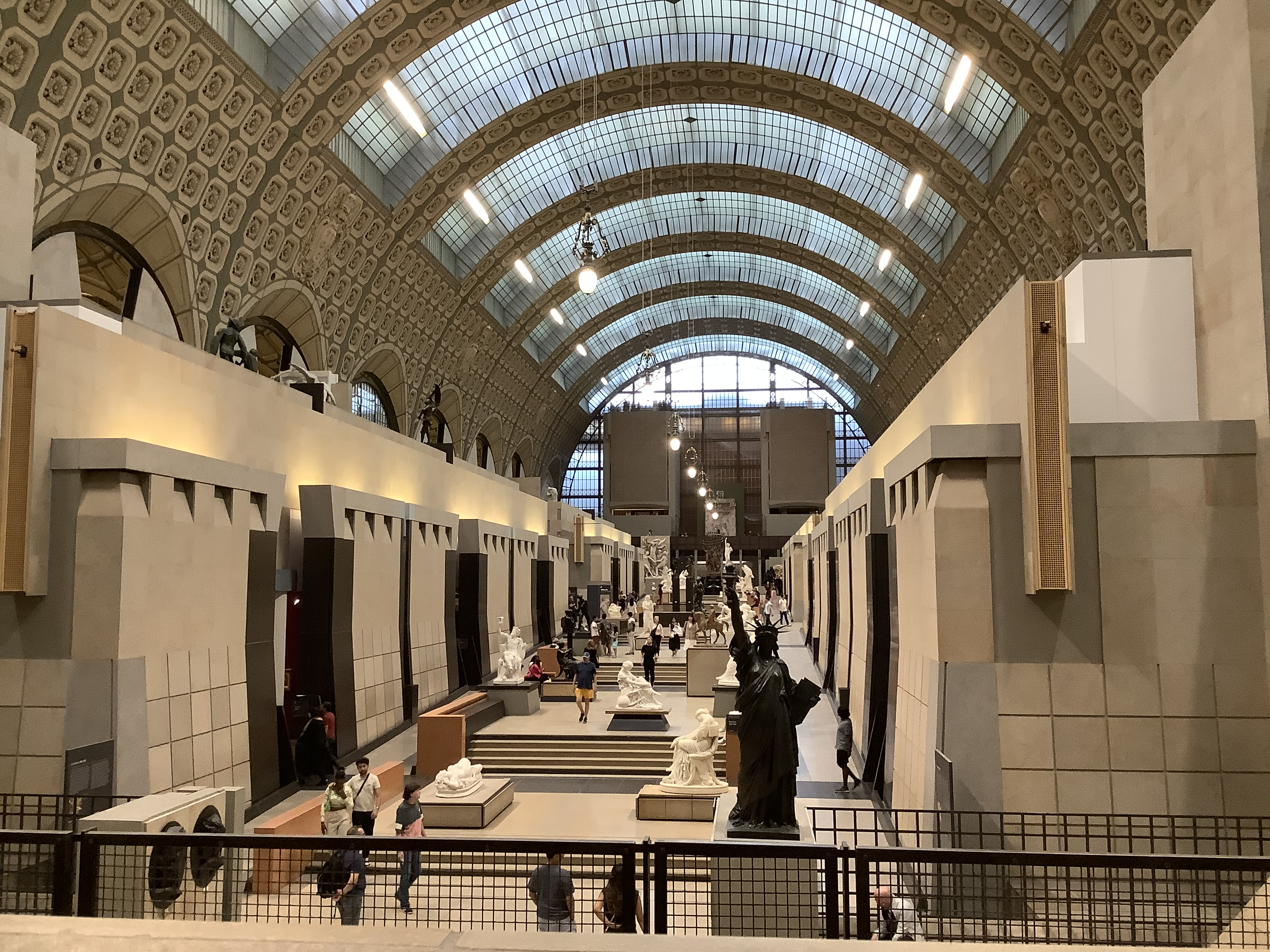
Musée d'Orsay

The Gare d'Orsay (Orsay railway station) was built on left bank of the Seine in 1900 to a plan by Victor Laloux. The Beaux-Arts style terminus station and the connected hotel served passengers travelling from southwest France to the capital.

In 1975, the French president, François Mitterrand, asked the French architectural firm, ACT to commence an adaptive reuse project to convert the Gare d'Orsay into a new museum, the Musée d'Orsay.

Initially, Aulenti was assigned solely to the interior design of the new museum. However, due to disagreements between ACT and the curators, her role expanded to encompass the overall architectural planning of the project. Aulenti successfully advocated for changes to the ACT design, which the curators believed was overly tied to neo-classical aesthetics and excessively ornate. In the final plan, however, some features of the Gare d'Orsay were preserved, including the mansard roof, an ornate art nouveau clock, large busts of Mercury and the rose patterned tiles covering the ceiling.

Aulenti divided the station into three levels. On the ground floor, the main corridor was re-aligned to the long axis of the building and set on a gentle slope to form a sculpture garden. Limestone tiles, in various shades of white, were attached to the surfaces of the ramp, platforms on the ramp and, at one end of the corridor, two new towers. The old art nouveau clock is balanced by Jean-Baptiste Carpeaux's sculpture, The Four Parts of the World Supporting the Celestial Sphere.

Balconies overlooking the main corridor (usually called the "nave") were added to the mezzanine and upper level (attic). Natural light enters the building from the original large, glass, barrel-vault ceiling, windows facing the Rue de Lille and from new oculi. By adding artificial lighting, Aulenti was able to achieve a uniform quality of illumination throughout the museum.

Mitterrand inaugurated the Musée d'Orsay on 1 December 1986. The museum's interior design has since been updated to feature halogen lighting, dark wood floors, and grey walls.

Charles Jencks, cultural theorist and architectural historian, described the Musée d'Orsay as an example of a "postmodern museum", where there is tension due to the past needing to exist in the present and the artistic in the academic. Jencks said, "The train shed, a symbol of nineteenth-century power and materialism, meets a thirteenth-century cathedral layout in a twentieth-century temple to the contradictions of nineteenth-century art."

He wrote of the museum,

The linear, suiting trains, also suits historical sequence with startling results. They give a clear beginning, middle and end to the gentle stroll through history. Overhead, the wide barrel vault of the old station spreads a generous light that pulls one gently up the progression of French art. The floor and the visitor mount slowly, too ... Gae Aulenti has articulated the walls to either side of this nave space in heavy Egyptian tones, but also with horizontal streamlines that push forward ... thus, the railway station becomes a cathedral with the left aisle housing the avant-garde and the right aisle holding the academy. Up the middle, the nave mixes the two competitors but not indiscriminately.

The new museum opened to the public on 9 December 1986 to mixed review. Paul Goldberger, architectural critic, wrote in The New York Times,

Unfortunately, the results of this ambitious project are, architecturally speaking, not natural at all. They are contrived, awkward and uncomfortable. The newly created Musée d'Orsay may be the most ambitious conversion of an old building into a museum in the modern history of Paris, but it is also a work of architecture that is deeply insensitive both to the original Gare d'Orsay and to the works of art it is supposed to be protecting and displaying. It will do little to advance the art of museum design, and it may well set the business of architectural ''recycling'' back a generation.

Aulenti received the Chevalier de Légion d'honneur in 1987.

==== Centre Georges Pompidou ====
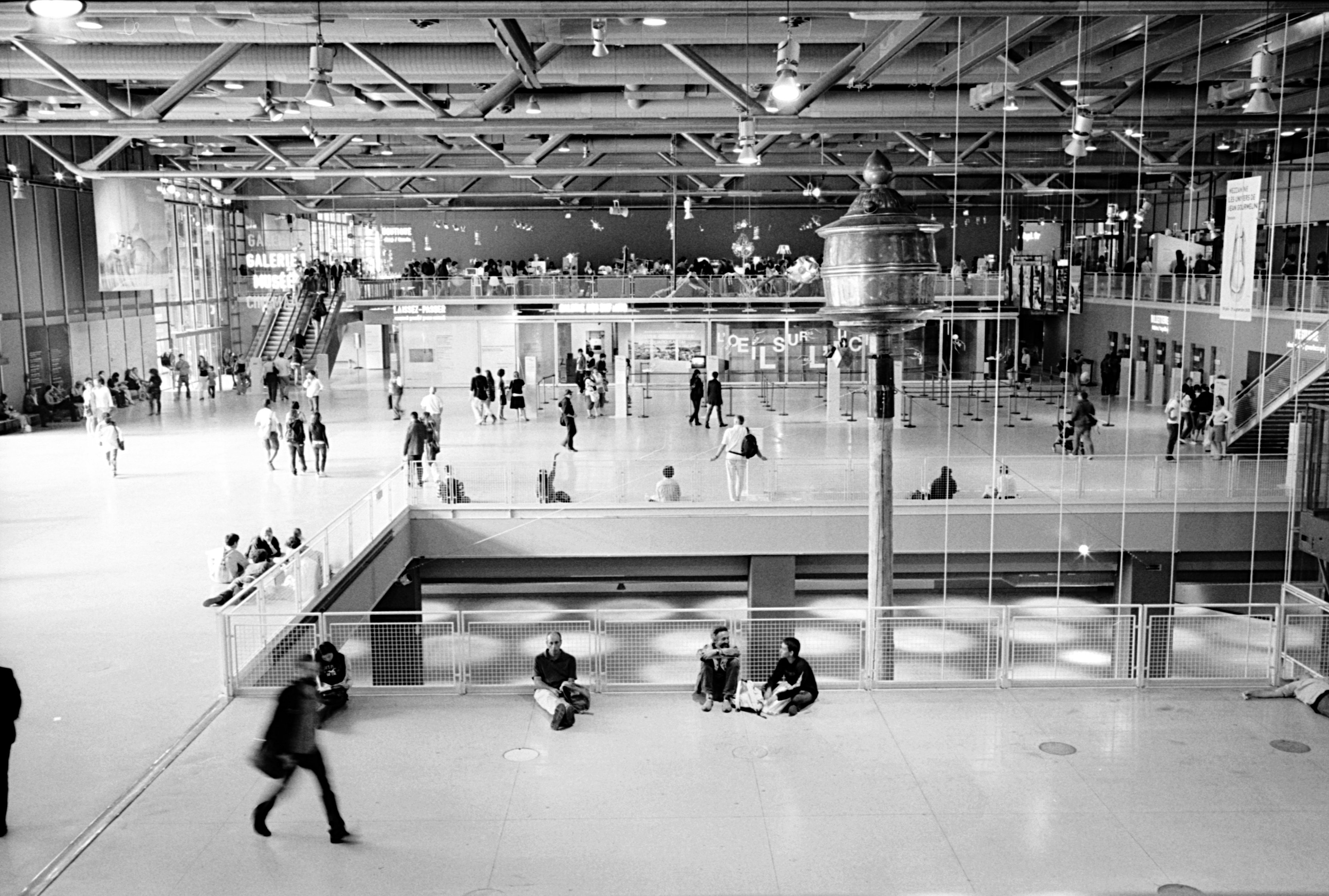
Interior, Centre Georges Pompidou, 2008

The Centre Pompidou, the home of the Musée National d'Art Moderne, was built between 1972 and 1977 to a plan by Renzo Piano and Richard Rogers. The ten-level building, constructed in glass and metal, was designed with expansive indoor spaces to provide flexibility in its use.

Aulenti was engaged to redesign the portion of the Musée occupying the fourth floor of the center, to create modular spaces better suited for smaller exhibitions, and to reduce the amount of natural light impacting the artworks. Aulenti created galleries of varying sizes along a building-length, unobstructed corridor-gallery set beside the west windows. She installed shelves, alcoves and pedestals within the galleries and created small corridors linking the galleries for fragile items that required low light.

The Musée itself owns a number of pieces from Aulenti's design career, from her 1964 April stainless steel and brown leather folding chair to its 2008 redesign in bright yellow toile vela (outdoor fabric).

==== Palazzo Grassi ====
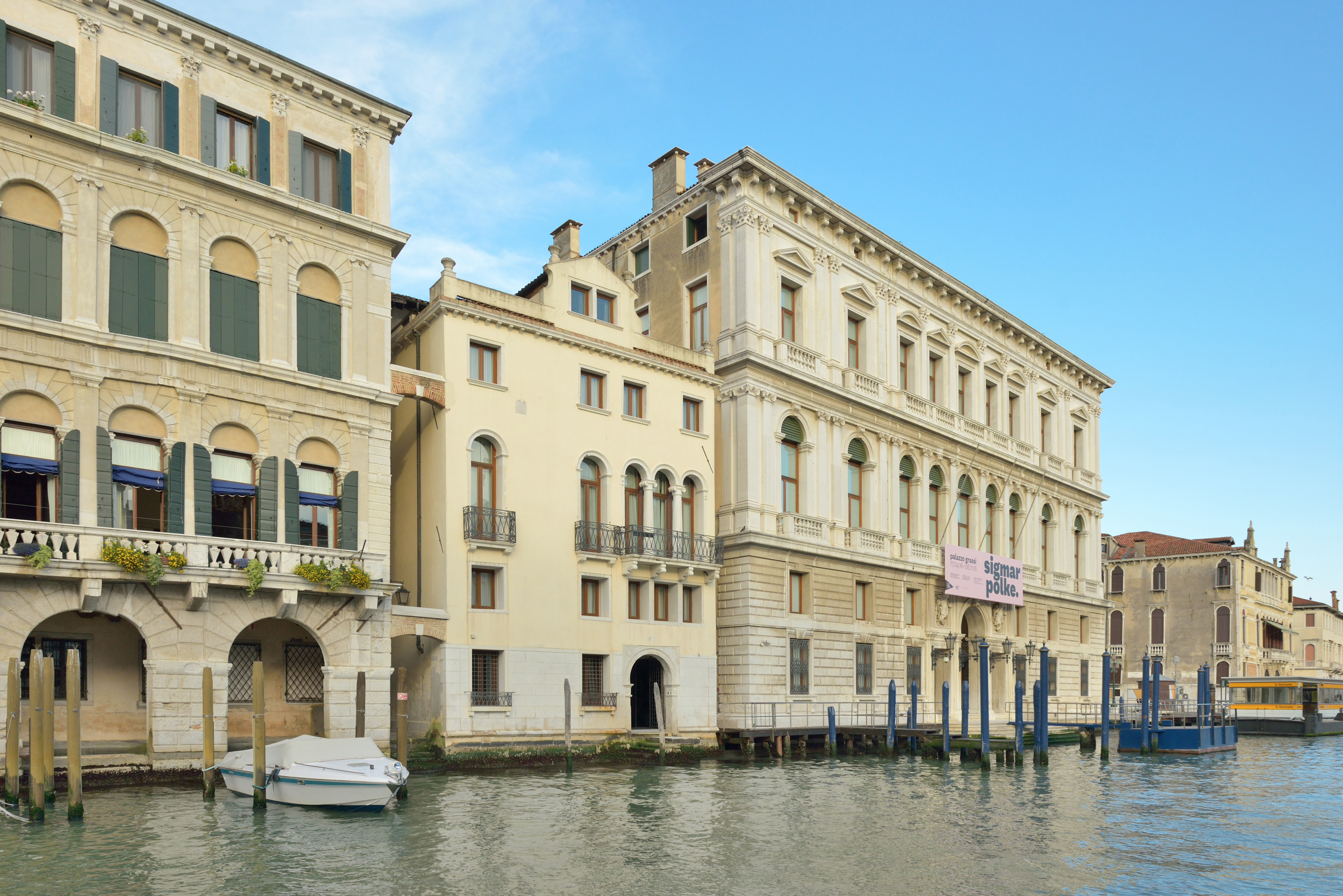
Palazzo Grassi, Venice

The Palazzo Grassi is an 18th-century mansion on the Grand Canal in Venice, Italy. In 1983, when the Palazzo was owned by the Fiat group, Aulenti was commissioned to refurbish the building as an art exhibition space. The Palazzo was gutted and refurbished over a thirteen-month period, reopening on 15 April 1985.

The existing three-level building was dark and labyrinthine, making its original features difficult to distinguish. Aulenti examined contemporary Venetian buildings for elements associated with the Palazzo's original architect, Giorgio Massari. Having repaired the original masonry with salvaged 19th century bricks, Aulenti fixed new utilities in a way that would leave the restored masonry undisturbed, even in future renovations. Paint was applied in a palette of aquamarine on pink marble-patterned stucco (marmorino).

Aulenti and Piero Castiglioni, an Italian lighting designer, created the Castello Lighting System for the Palazzo. The Castello system, designed for flexibility, was manufactured in aluminium with low voltage halogen bulbs. It won a Compasso d'Oro design award in 1995.

In the following years, Aulenti returned a number of times to the Palazzo Grassi to design popular exhibitions. I Fenici (1988), I Celti (1991) and I Greci in Occidente (1996) were all months long archeological expositions designed for the non-scholar. In creating I Fenici (The Phoenicians) with Sabatino Moscati, archeologist and curator of the exhibition, Aulenti created a path for visitors with two distinct educational threads; first, a traditional display of archaeological objects categorized by typology and geography and second, an exploration of Phoenician culture. The exhibit embodied Aulenti's aptitude for stage design, featuring a salmon-pink sand dune as a set for eight sarcophagi and a large pool for model ships. Additionally, Aulenti presented information in graffiti and murals.

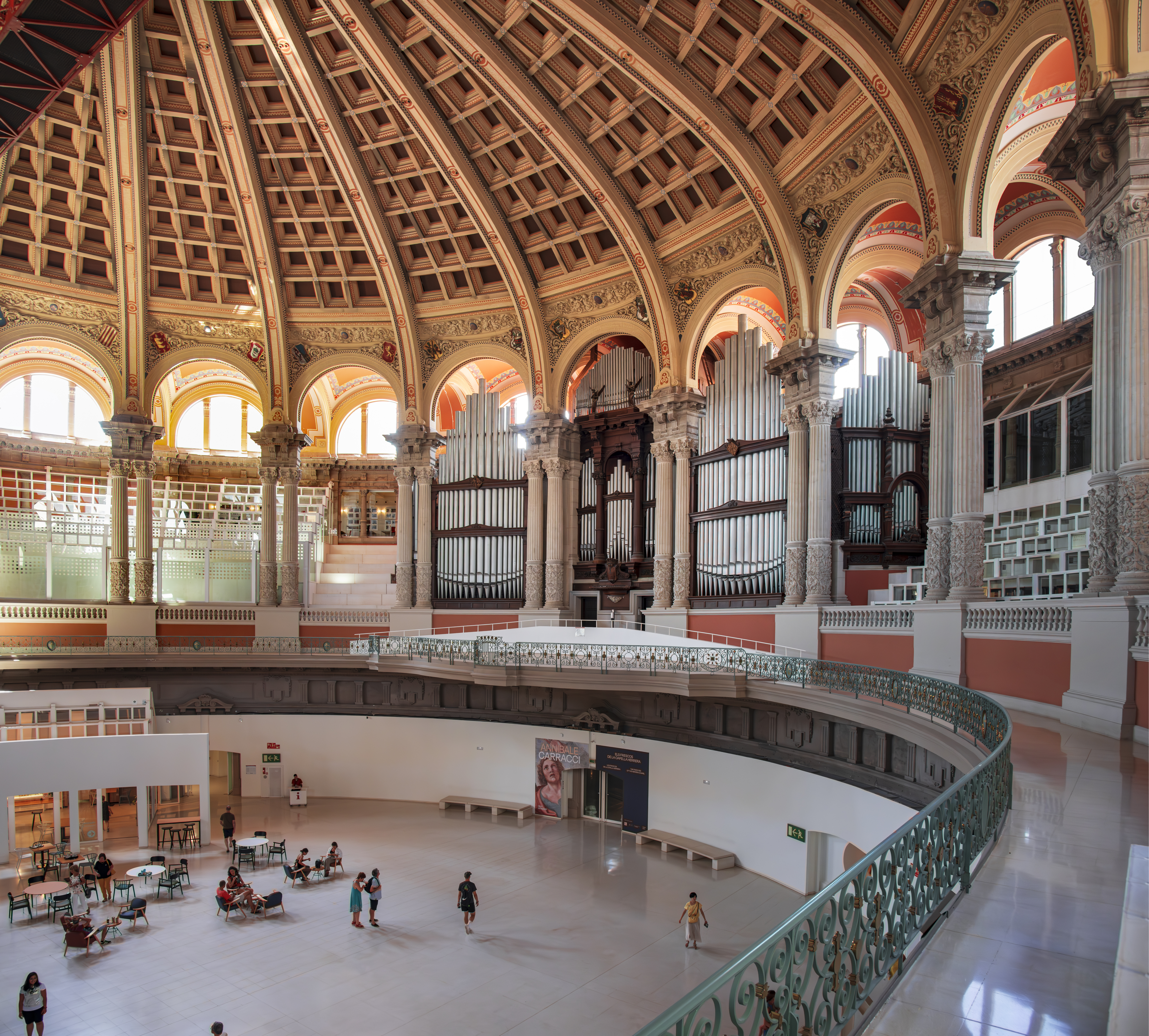
Saló Oval, Museu Nacional d'Art de Catalunya (2022)

==== Museu Nacional d'Art de Catalunya ====
The Museu Nacional d'Art de Catalunya at the Palau Nacional, Barcelona, home of the Catalan visual arts collection, was constructed on Montjuïc for the 1929 World's Fair. As part of a design team including Enric Steegman and Josep Benedito, between 1985 and 1992, Aulenti refurbished the Saló Oval (the main hall) and consolidated two temporary exhibition rooms for the 1992 Summer Olympics. Glass was added to the outer walls of the Saló Oval for better illumination and once again, Castiglioni created the artificial lighting plan.

==== Japan ====
Aulenti designed the chancellery of the Italian Embassy (2004) and the Italian Cultural Institute (2005) in Tokyo. At the Italian Cultural Institute, Aulenti used an RAL 3011 coloured cladding, a red-brown hue which was controversial due to the perceived intensity of the colour. On the ten year anniversary of Aulenti's death, the Italian Cultural Institute in Tokyo presented an exhibition of her drawings, photographs, models and materials called Uno sguardo sul Giappone e sul mondo (A look at Japan and the world).

==== Other selected architectural design projects ====
Aulenti's other projects included the conversion of Scuderie del Quirinale, Quirinal Palace, Rome to an exhibition space for the 2000 Great Jubilee, the redesigning of the Asian Art Museum of San Francisco (2003), the restoration of the Palazzo Branciforte in Palermo, Sicily (2007) and the expansion of the Perugia San Francesco d'Assisi (Umbria International Airport) for the 150th anniversary of the unification of Italy (2011). In 1991, Aulenti converted a 17th-century granary at the Torrecchia Vecchia estate in Lazio to a villa for Carlo Caracciolo. Aulenti designed the Italian Pavilion at the Seville Expo '92 and the redevelopment of the Piazzale Cadorna (2000) in Milan. The Città degli Studi College (1994), at Briella was one of Aulenti's few stand-alone architectural projects.

=== Stage design ===
Aulenti and Luca Ronconi, theatre director and producer, founded Laboratorio di Progettazione Teatrale (the Prato Theatre design workshop) in the late 1970s. Together, they staged 16 productions including, Pier Paolo Pasolini's Calderón, Euripide's Le Baccanti, and Hugo von Hofmannsthall's La Torre.

In her stage design, Aulenti looked to Filippo Tommaso Marinetti's work, A Manifesto of Variety Theatre (1913). Marinetti rejected imitation of the historic and the obsessive reproduction of daily life. Rather, he chose freedom in design, the use of a cinematic background, and imaginative, satiric and futuristic concepts. Aulenti did not rely on scenery canvas and flats to provide perspective. Instead, she divided the stage with structures, such as platforms and steps, in order to give context to the action.

At La Scala in 1977, Aulenti created the stage design for Wozzeck, the atonal opera by Alban Berg. Claudio Abbado was the conductor with Gloria Lane and Guglielmo Sarabia the principals. Aulenti's daughter, Giovanna Buzzi, designed the costumes.

The French music critic, Jacques Lonchampt reviewed the production in Le Monde. He described the stage as being enclosed by a large "crushing" wall and prison gate, and the stage itself, a "conveyor belt", starting and stopping but inexorably carrying the characters towards the prison.

Lonchampt wrote,

This device has the major drawback of raising the stage quite considerably and of distancing the singers from the room. The sound is lost in the flies and in the first rows, at least, the voices seem thin, without force or resonance ... unreal ... which is serious in a work with such brief tableaux, where the listener must feel the physical presence of the characters from the outset.

The Italian musicologist, Massimo Mila, reviewed this production in La Stampa. He described a construction of moving boards which changed colour with different lights. The moving mechanism brought props such as a chair and table or roughly arranged blankets and mattresses to the scene. Mila thought the stage design was effective until the noise of some unintended movements of the device interrupted the performance.

Nicholas Vitaliano, Ronconi's biographer, wrote that Aulenti and Ronconi wanted to designed a "stage machine", a moving surface traversing the entire stage, which was otherwise left in almost entire darkness.

Aulenti's stage design for Ronconi's production of Rossini's opera, Il viaggio a Reims (Journey to Reims) at the Rossini Opera Festival in Pesaro (1984) involved on-stage television monitors. From their position on the stage, video operators filmed the performance and in real time, broadcast the recordings, such as close-ups of the singers, onto the monitors. In addition, actors (playing the king and his retinue) were filmed processing on the streets outside the theatre. Television monitors around the city broadcast the action inside the theatre while the monitors in the theatre played the action on the streets. Italian critics praised this staging but critics from the United Kingdom and the United States did not.

The premier of Samstag aus Licht by Karlheinz Stockhausen was produced by Ronconi for La Scala (1984). La Scala was too small for the expected audience and so the production was moved to the Palazzo dello sport (the Milan sports centre). In the stadium space, Aulenti and Ronconi created a spectacle. In the act, "Lucifer's dance", the "spirit of negation" appeared on stilts in front of a very large human face. The character on stilts controlled the face through the music of a wind band that was seated on a vertical frame on the stage.

Aulenti also created the stage designs for Elektra by Richard Strauss in Milan (1984) and The Wild Duck by Henrik Ibsen in Genoa.

=== Exhibition design ===
Aulenti designed exhibition spaces both in Italy and abroad.

At the Solomon R. Guggenheim Museum, in New York City, Aulenti designed the exhibition space for The Italian Metamorphosis 1943–1968 (1994), an exhibition of post-war art and design curated by Germano Celant. Aulenti created a large sculpture of wire triangles which projected into the museum's atrium. The visitors' perspective on the sculpture gradually changed as they moved up the ramp. Benjamin Buchloh commented that designers, such as Aulenti, are able to highlight their own "trademark" architectural aesthetic by incorporating it into their exhibition design. He was critical, suggesting that this is to the detriment of the artistic work or object being displayed. Buchloch described Aulenti's "zig-zag" design, when placed in the curved space of the Guggenheim, as a "vagina dentata".

=== Milan Triennial ===
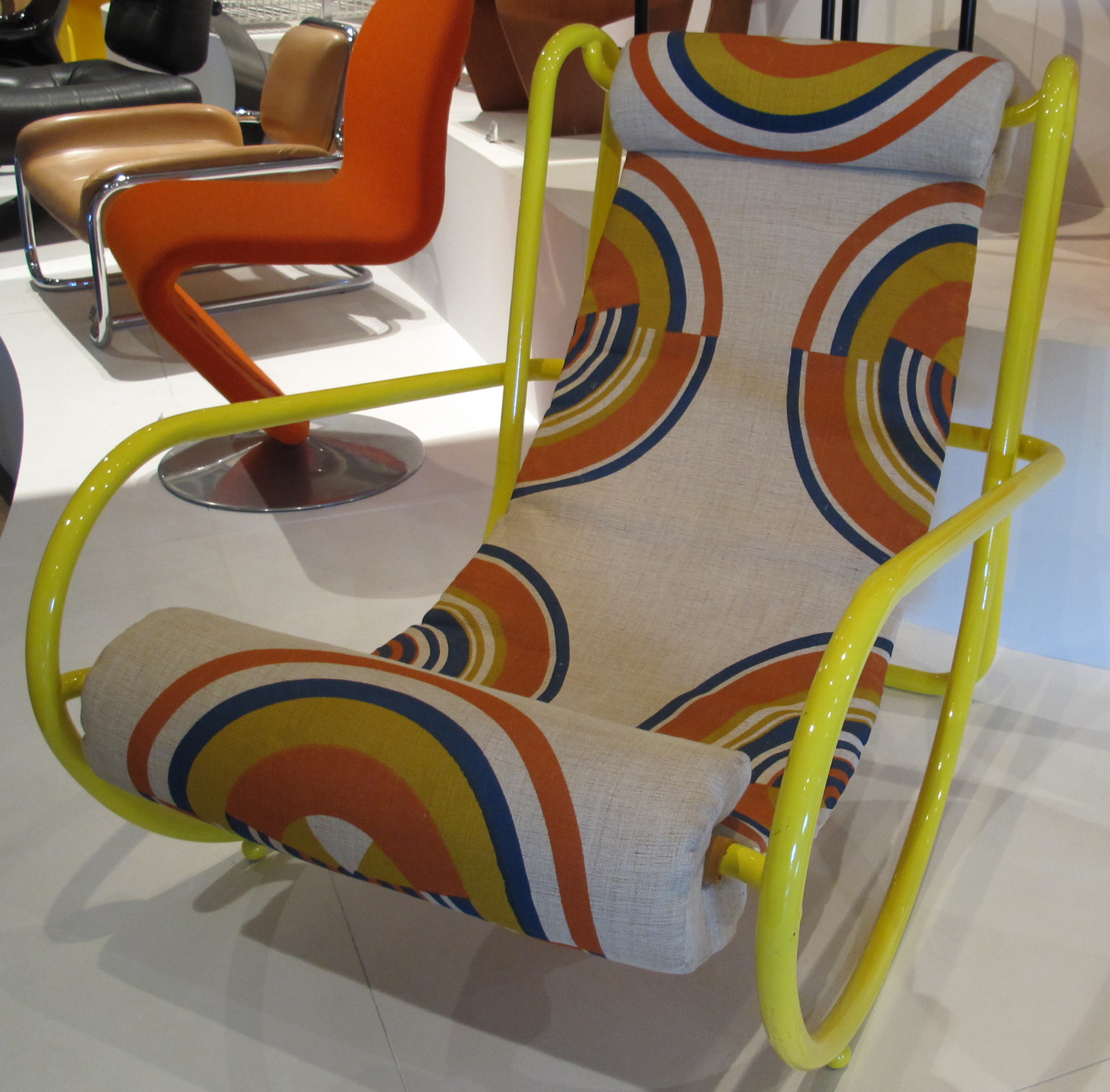
Chair, Locus Solus collection.

Aulenti had an association with the Milan Triennial over many years. She presented her own work, "Ideal apartment for an urban location" at the La casa e la scuola exhibition at the 12th Triennial in 1960.

Then, in 1964, she won the Grand International Prize for Arrivo al Mare (Arrival at the seaside). In this work, Aulenti installed a large mirrored room with multiple, life-sized, colour-sketched cut-outs of women in simple robes, standing under a ceiling of slung fabric strips. It was inspired by Pablo Picasso.

Aulenti was a member of the executive of the Triennial from 1977 to 1980. She designed spaces for installations at exhibitions such as the 1951–2001 Made in Italy? (2001).

== Professional affiliations ==
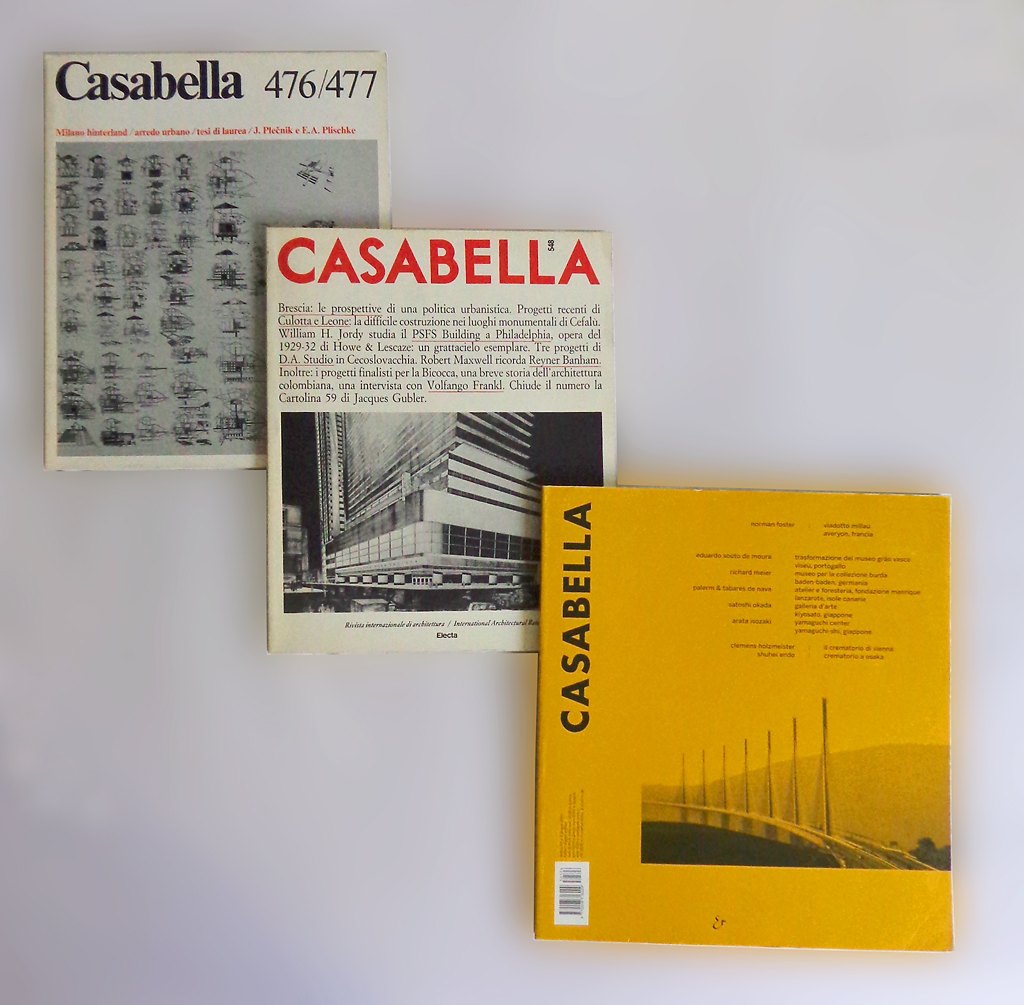
Issues of Casabella magazine

From 1955 to 1965, Aulenti was a member of the editorial staff of the design magazine, Casabella Continuità. Aulenti wrote two articles for Casabella: Soviet architecture (1962) and Marin County (1964). From 1954 to 1962, Aulenti was a member of the editorial staff of Lotus international, the quarterly Milanese architecture magazine.

As an educator, Aulenti was an assistant professor of architectural composition (1960–1962) at Ca' Foscari University of Venice, adjunct assistant professor of elements of architectural composition (1964) at Milan Polytechnic, and visiting lecturer at the College of Architecture, Barcelona and the Stockholm Cultural Centre (1969–1975). She also taught at the Milan School of Architecture (1964–1967).

Aulenti was a member of Movimento Studi per I'Architettura, Milan (1955–1961) and the Association for Industrial Design, Milan (1960 and vice-president in 1966).

== Death and legacy ==
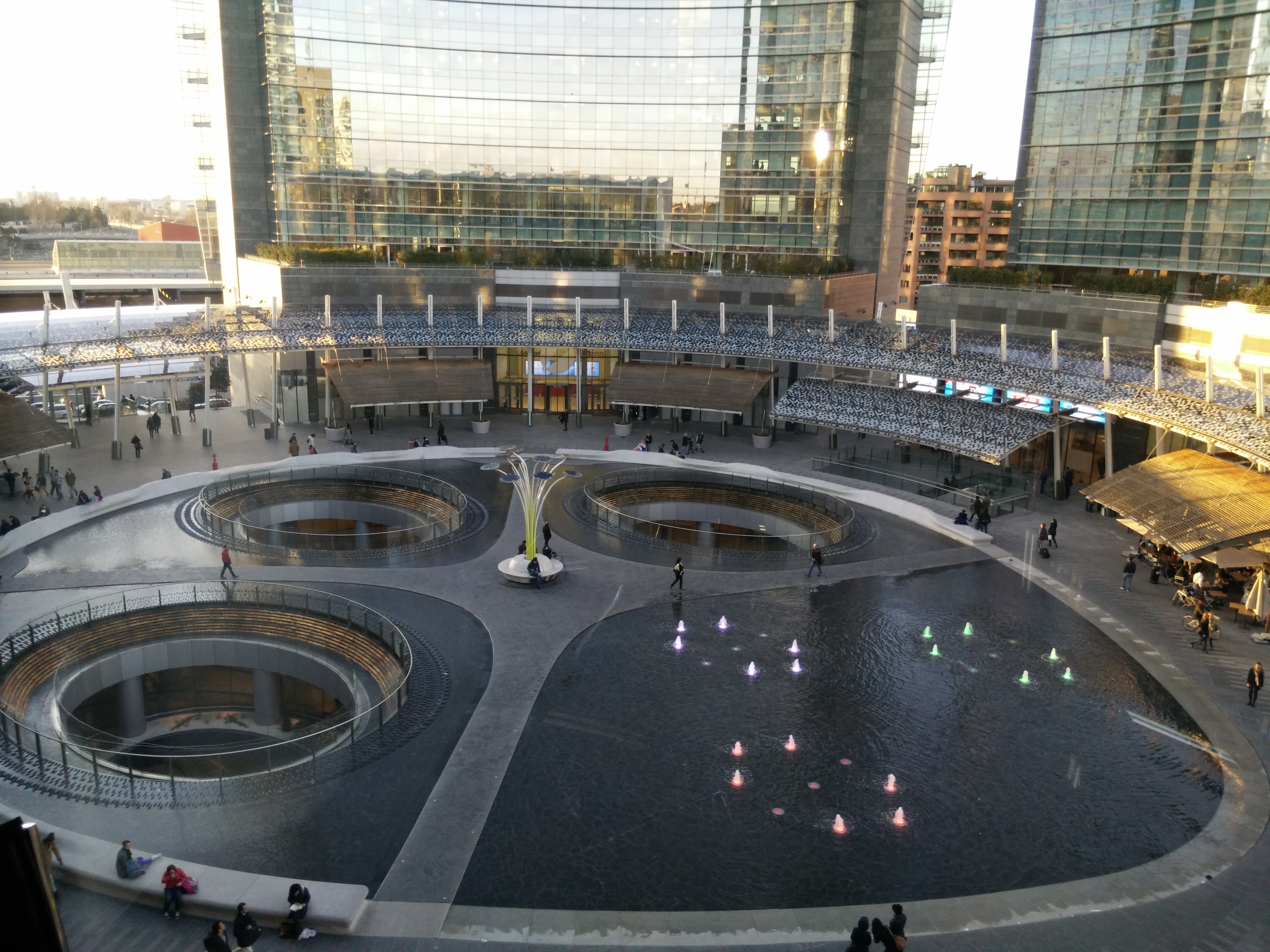
Piazza Gae Aulenti

On 31 October 2012, Aulenti died at her home in the Brera district of Milan as a result of chronic illness. This was fifteen days, after her last public appearance when she received the gold medal for Lifetime Achievement at the Milan Triennial. At noon on 4 November 2012, a remembrance service was held at the Ridotto dei Palchi hall at La Scala.

Ten days after her death, Aulenti's major work to expand the Perugia San Francesco d'Assisi – Umbria International Airport was inaugurated. It was designed for the 150th anniversary of the unification of Italy.

In December 2012, the Piazza Gae Aulenti was dedicated to Aulenti's memory. It is a contemporary public space surrounded by private enterprises in the Isola neighbourhood near the Porta Garibaldi railway station. The piazza is 100 meters in diameter and is constructed 6 meters above ground level. There are three large fountains with a boardwalk extending to the centre of the piazza.

After Aulenti's death, the Milan Triennial and Archivio Gae Aulenti created an exhibition remembering her life and work. It is a sequence of rooms recreating, true to size, several of her interior design projects, including the Arrivo al Mare room. At the centre of the exhibition is a display of Aulenti's industrial design works and around the perimeter, a display of Aulenti's papers.

From 2020 to 2021, the Vitra Design Museum, a private museum in Germany, presented the exhibition, Gae Aulenti: A Creative Universe.

For the tenth anniversary of Aulenti's death, Open House – Milan and the Aulenti estate created an exhibition highlighting Aulenti's contribution to architecture, choosing one project from each of the Open House Italia network cities: Milan (Piazza Cadorna), Naples (Piazza Dante), Rome (Scuderie del Quirinale) and Turin (Palavela).

A selection of Aulenti's papers, drawings, and designs, including the design drawings for the Asian Art Museum in San Francisco, California are curated at the International Archive of Women in Architecture in the Newman Library, at Virginia Tech. Drawings, photographic material and design models under plexiglass by Aulenti are held by Sistema Informativo Unificato per le Soprintendenze Archivistiche (SIUSA). Aulenti's granddaughter, Nina Artioli is the curator of Aulenti's archive in Milan.

Architects, Marco Bifoni, Francesca Fenaroli and Vittoria Massa continue under Aulenti's name as G.A. Architetti Associati.

== Awards ==
- Ubi Prize for Stage Design, Milan, 1980
- Architecture Medal, Academie d' Architecture, Paris, 1983
- Josef Hoffmann Prize, Hochschule fur Angewandte Kunst, Vienna, 1984
- Commandeur, Order des Artes et Letters, France,1987
- Honorary Dean of Architecture, Merchandise Mart of Chicago, 1988
- Accademico Nazionale, Accademia di San Luca, Rome, 1988
- Premio speciale della cultura, Repubblica Italiana X Legislatura, 1989
- Praemium Imperiale, Japan, 1991

== See also ==
- List of furniture designers
- List of women architects
- Women in architecture – Overview of women architects
