= Tokachi Millennium Forest =

Park Tokachi, Hokkaido

Coordinates: 42.934°N 142.864°E

Tokachi Millennium Forest is a project initiated by newspaper owner Mitsushige Hayashi. In 1990 he bought 400 hectares in Tokachi on the island Hokkaido, in the far north of Japan. His plan was to off-set the carbon footprint of his newspaper Tokachi Mainichi, creating a public park. The project is made up of woodland, gardens, productive areas, "land forms" earthworks, goat farm, rose garden, orchards, meadows and a cafe. It was designed by Dan Pearson, with head gardener Midori Shintani and her assistant Shintaro Sasagawa. The place name refers to the intention of creating a garden to last 1000 years.

== Project ==
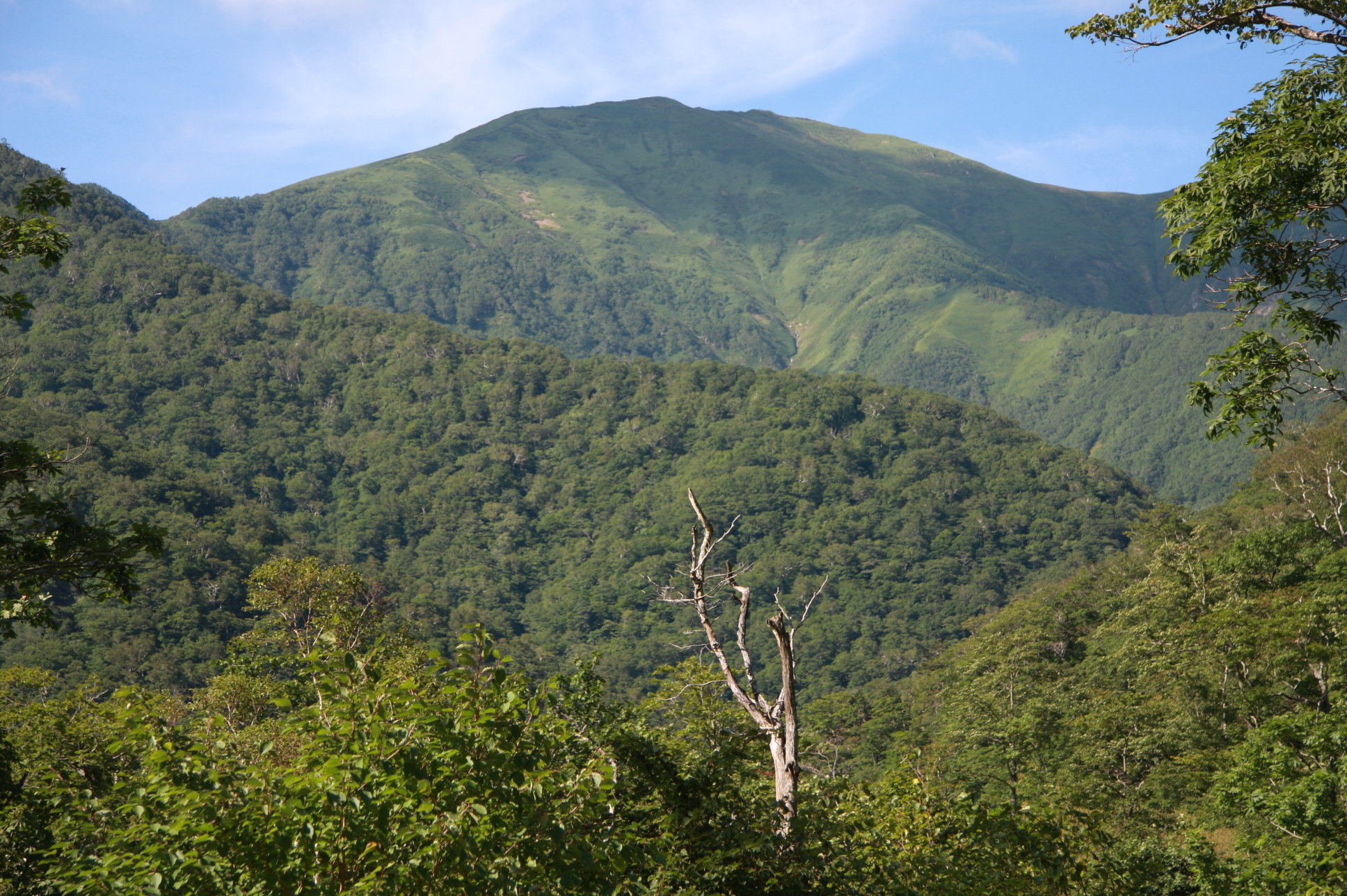
The South side of Mount Tokachi in the Hidaka range

Set below the Hidaka Mountains on Hokkaido island, mogul Mitsushige Hayashi began buying the land for the project in 1990. The surrounding wild forests had been felled and replanted for timber, and areas had been converted to farmland. There were a lot of invasive plant species taking over from the native wild flowers. Hayashi began landscape planning for the area in 1996. British landscape designer and plantsman Dan Pearson joined in 2000, working with landscape architect Fumiaki Takano. The gardens were first planted in spring 2008. It was designed in a naturalistic style, echoing and comfortably sitting within the mountains and forests that surround the space, "always with an eye to letting the planting lead the way." The landscape, criss-crossed with mountain streams, is constantly dynamic and changing each year, with up to 20 to 30 shifting species per square metre. Head gardener Midori Shintani, who joined in 2008, cites the ancient Japanese reverence for nature and "the beauty of evanescence" as the inspiration for the project. It references the ancient Japanese calendar of 72 seasons (pentads). The aim is to entice residents of Japan's intense, dense, urban areas into a "safe place" in nature, so they can reconnect with wilder spaces. Its sustainable, careful husbandry and nurturance should make it viable and valuable for 1000 years - instilling a sense of responsibility for natural landscapes in future generations. She notes "we use minimum tools, minimum management, but maximum vision." The process of restoring the land after commercial use, involved removing invasive, aggressive plants such as bamboos, and making space for the plants in the latent seed bank in the soils to break out. Contoured earth works were designed to create variance and diversity of growing conditions. The short growing season determines much of the garden design, with the long winters of deep snows covering the ground from November to April, temperatures descending to -20C. During the winters the weather is too harsh for staff to work outside. Meadow planting involved some non-natives. 35,000 plants were planted in 2008 alone in the meadow area. The island was hit by a typhoon in 2016, which devastated the project and swept away most of the bridges, and reshaped some of the land. The project is part of a garden trail connecting seven major gardens.

== Awards ==
- Dan Pearson won the Society of Garden Designers grand award in 2012 for his work on the Tokachi Millennium Forest. The judges described the work as "extraordinarily skilful and appeared completely effortless and natural".
- Tokachi Millennium Forest was awarded Highest Performance Prize from JSCE(Japan Society of Civil Engineering) in 2018.
