= Midori Shintani (horticulturalist) =

Japanese horticulturalist

Midori Shintani (Japanese: 新谷 みどり, Hepburn: Shintani Midori) is a Japanese horticulturalist. She is the head gardener of the Tokachi Millennium Forest in Hokkaido, Japan.

== Books ==
- with Dan Pearson Tokachi Millennium Forest: Pioneering a New Way of Gardening with Nature (Filbert Press, 2021)
