= Torrecchia Vecchia =

Estate in Cisterna di Latina, Lazio, Italy

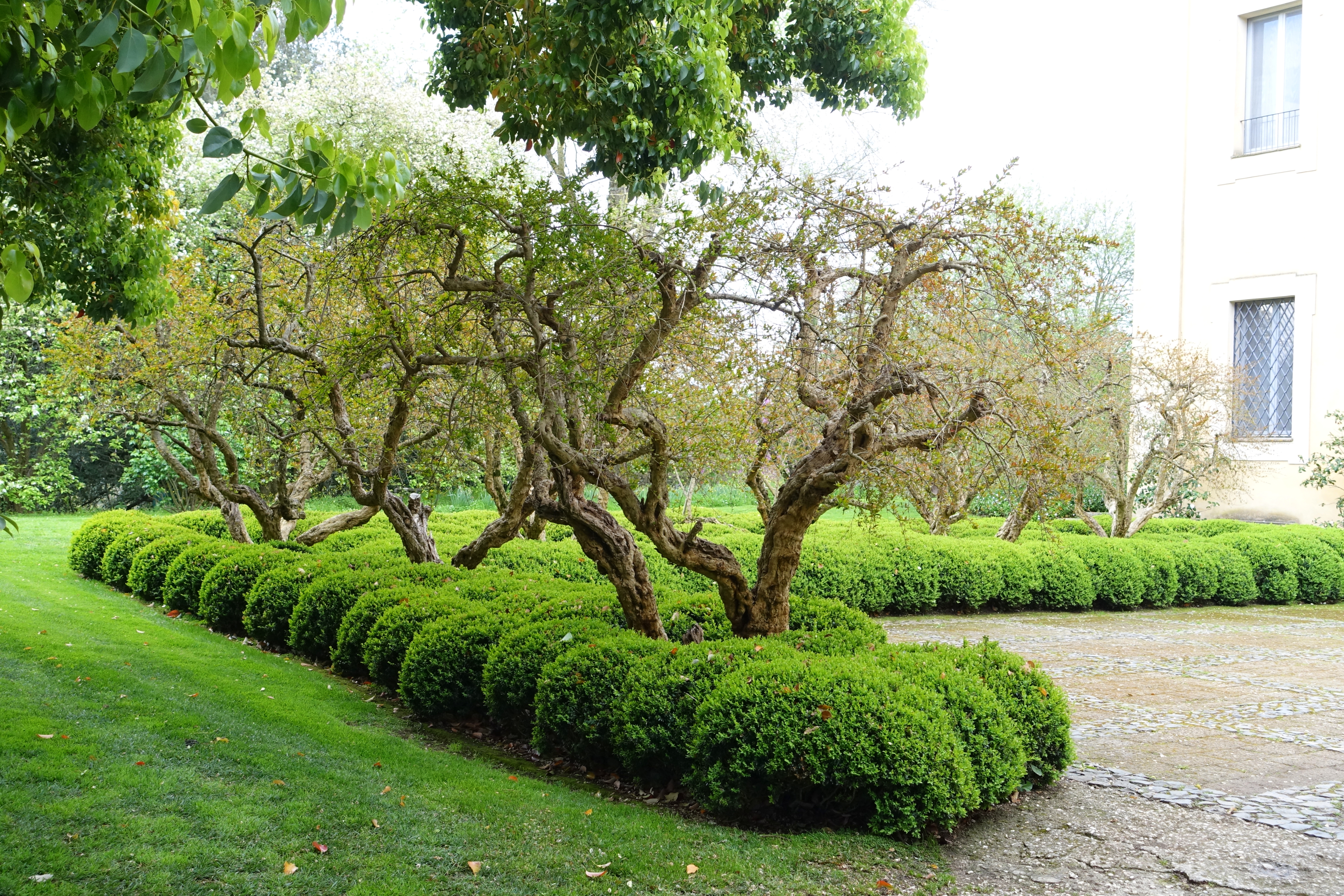
Pomegranate trees and box balls

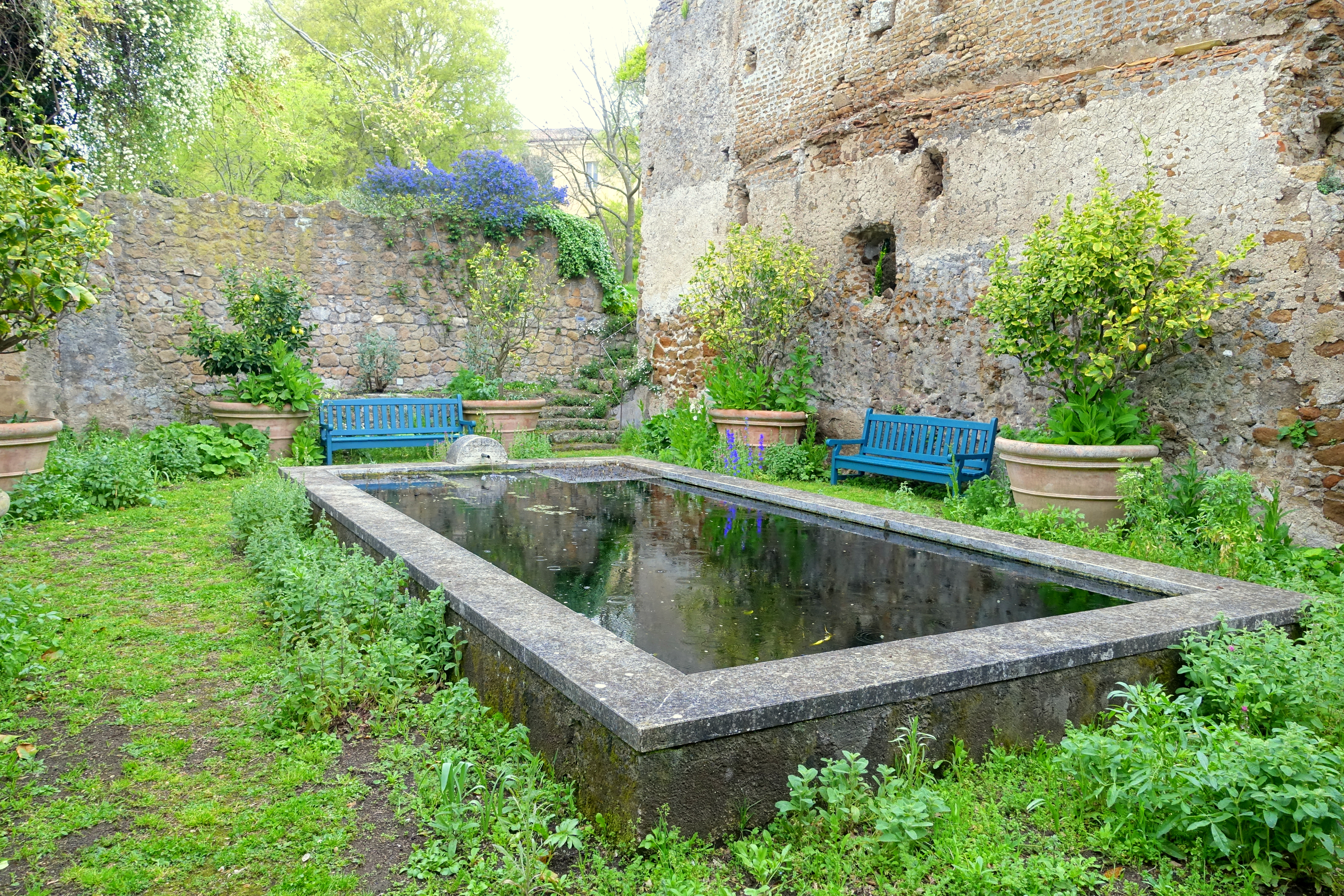
Pool amid ruins

Torrecchia Vecchia is a private estate of over 1500 acres located in Cisterna di Latina, Lazio, Italy, which may be visited by permission. It contains over 625 acres of woodland, was recognized as a Natural Monument in 2007, and contains notable English-style gardens designed by Lauro Marchetti, Dan Pearson, and others.

The estate originally contained a medieval hilltop village and ruined castle, but was abandoned some 800 years ago. In 1991 Prince Carlo Caracciolo, an Italian newspaper baron, and his wife Violante Visconti bought the estate, and hired architect Gae Aulenti to convert its 17th-century barn into a villa. Violante Visconti decided to create a garden around the villa, originally with the help of Lauro Marchetti, curator of the nearby Garden of Ninfa, and from 1995 onwards to designs by Dan Pearson. His contributions were primarily in green and white colors, per her direction. Over the next five years, Pearson visited twice a year; in 1999 he appointed his student Stuart Barfoot to continue the work under his guidance. After Violante's death in 2000, the two gardeners worked closely with Caracciolo to extend the garden with a wider range of color in the new areas.
