= Carlo Caracciolo =

Italian nobleman and publisher (1925–2008)

- 9th Prince of Castagneto; 4th Duke of Melito
- Born: Prince Carlo Caracciolo di Castagneto; 23 October 1925; Florence, Italy
- Died: 15 December 2008 (aged 83); Florence, Italy
- Family: House of Caracciolo
- Spouse: Violante Visconti di Modrone (m.1996–2000; her death)
- Issue: 1
- Father: Filippo Caracciolo, 8th Prince of Castagneto, 3rd Duke of Melito
- Mother: Princess Margaret Clarke
- Occupation: media entrepreneur and publisher

Don Carlo Caracciolo, 9th Prince of Castagneto, 4th Duke of Melito (23 October 1925 – 15 December 2008), was an Italian media publisher. He created Gruppo Editoriale L'Espresso, one of Italy's leading publishing groups, which included Italy's newspaper of record, La Repubblica. He was known as "the editor prince", a reference to his aristocratic birth and elegant manner.

== Early life ==
The oldest of three children, Caracciolo was born in Florence to Filippo Caracciolo, 8th Principe di Castagneto, 3rd Duca di Melito, and American heiress Margaret Clarke. He was an older brother to Nicola Caracciolo and Marella Agnelli, the wife of Fiat S.p.A. chairman Gianni Agnelli and half-sibling of film producer Ettore Rosboch von Wolkenstein, whose daughter Bloomberg News journalist Elisabetta "Lili", Caracciolo's goddaughter, married Prince Amedeo of Belgium, Archduke of Austria-Este. Along with his brother and sister, he grew up in Rome and Turkey, and spoke Italian, French, and English. At 18, he fought in the Italian resistance movement during World War II. After the war, he attended Harvard Law School and worked for a New York law firm that had as a partner Allen Dulles, future head of the CIA. In the United States, he began to show a serious interest in publishing.

== Career ==
In 1951, Caracciolo moved into publishing in Milan, and in 1955 set up the N.E.R. (Nuove Edizioni Romane) publishing house with the progressive industrialist Adriano Olivetti, manufacturer of Olivetti typewriters. In October 1955, the company founded the news magazine L'Espresso with editors Arrigo Benedetti and Eugenio Scalfari. Caracciolo was a man of the liberal left. He disdained his aristocratic title but betrayed it in his elegance of dress and manner. He believed that a modern postwar Italian republic should be run on lay rather than religious principles, and his news outlets campaigned for reform of the laws governing divorce and abortion. L'Espresso was characterized from the beginning by an aggressive investigative journalism strongly focused on corruption and clientelism by the Christian Democracy party. This made the main shareholder Olivetti unpopular with the ministries and large companies that were the primary customers of his main business. In 1956, with the magazine losing money, Olivetti made Caracciolo a present of the majority shareholding.

In 1976, Caracciolo and Eugenio Scalfari, with backing from the publisher Arnoldo Mondadori Editore, set up the daily newspaper La Repubblica. It was founded in Rome as a national newspaper and published in the novel tabloid size. In 1984, shortly before it began to outsell the prestigious Corriere della Sera, Caracciolo took his publishing activities to the Italian stock exchange. Four years later, he sold his holdings in Editoriale L'Espresso to Mondadori. In 1990, he was shocked to learn that Mondadori's heirs had sold out to Silvio Berlusconi, whose politics he detested. After much in-fighting and litigation, the news publications were hived off into the Gruppo Editoriale L'Espresso controlled by the CIR Group of entrepreneur Carlo De Benedetti, of which Caracciolo remained honorary president until 2006.

In June 1989, Caracciolo was awarded the Italian Order of Merit for Labour. In 1991, he and his wife Violante Visconti purchased the Torrecchia Vecchia estate, and subsequently developed its villa with architect Gae Aulenti, around which they created a notable, English-style garden to designs by Dan Pearson and others. In 2007, a year after he retired from the Espresso Group to become its honorary chairman, he bought a 33 percent share in the French newspaper Libération.

== Personal life and death ==
Caracciolo had a romantic relationship with Anna Cataldi while she’s married to steel tycoon Giorgio Falck. Caracciolo adopted their daughter Jacaranda Falck. He then married Violante Visconti di Modrone, a member of the noble Visconti di Modrone family in 1996 until her death in 2000 due to ovarian cancer. Through his marriage to Violante, he was the stepfather of film director Umberto Pasolini.

He died in 2008 at the age of 83. According to his biographer and former co-editor of L'Espresso, Nello Ajello: "He set an example for free and independent editorial content that initially seemed marginal and exclusive and instead became a major force in Italian newspaper publishing."
