= Melissano =

Melissano Melissane (Greek)
- Comune
- Comune di Melissano
- Location within Italy Location within Apulia
- Coordinates: 39°58′N 18°08′E
- Country: Italy
- Region: Apulia
- Province: Lecce (LE)

Government
  - Mayor: Roberto Falconieri

Area
  - Total: 12 km^{2} (4.6 sq mi)
- Elevation: 59 m (194 ft)

Population (31 December 2004)
  - Total: 7,495
  - Density: 620/km^{2} (1,600/sq mi)
- Demonym: Melissanesi
- Time zone: UTC+1 (CET)
  - Summer (DST): UTC+2 (CEST)
- Postal code: 73040
- Dialing code: 0833
- ISTAT code: 075044
- Patron saint: St. Anthony of Padua
- Saint day: June 13
- Website: Official website

Melissano (Salentino: Milissanu; Greek: Melissane) is a town and comune in the province of Lecce, part of the Apulia region of south-east Italy.
