= Nicola Caracciolo =

Italian nobleman, journalist, and historian (1931–2020)

Don Nicola Caracciolo, 10th Prince of Castagneto, 5th Duke of Melito (19 May 1931 – 24 April 2020), was an Italian nobleman, journalist, and historian.

== Early life ==
Born in Florence, Kingdom of Italy, he was the 10th Prince of Castagneto and the 5th Duke of Melito, being the descendent of an old noble Neapolitan family dating back to the Kingdom of Naples. His father was Filippo Caracciolo (1903–1965), the 8th Prince of Castagneto, the 3rd Duke of Melito, and an hereditary Patrician of Naples. His mother was Margaret Clarke (1898–1955) of Peoria, Illinois, the heiress of a well-known family of whiskey producers. He had two siblings: Carlo Caracciolo (1925–2008) who went on to found the Gruppo Editoriale L'Espresso, and Marella Agnelli (1927–2019) who became an art collector, socialite, style icon, and wife of Fiat S.p.A. chairman Gianni Agnelli. Along with them, he grew up in Rome and Turkey, and spoke Italian, French, and English.

== Career ==
Caracciolo's journalism career included being the special correspondent for L'Espresso and Il Giorno during the Algerian War, and then the Washington correspondent for La Stampa from 1964 to 1969. Since 1970, he was the author of numerous articles for the Boomerang television magazine and since 1974 shot several documentaries together with Emanuele Vittorio Marino, most of which deal with themes of contemporary and historical Italy and have been well received by both the public and critics. He was also an environmentalist, and he was particularly concerned about nature conservation and was opposed to the construction of the Tyrrhenian motorway in Maremma, where he was called "the prince of Capalbio". In the town, he headed the literary prize and the Maremma Tuscia section of Italia Nostra, of which he served as honorary president.

An avid passionate of cinema, Caracciolo was known for his TV appearances narrating the histories of World War II, the Holocaust, and the Italian Social Republic for RAI, being an avid passionate for history from an early age; they included documentaries, such as I 600 giorni di Salò (1991), Succede un quarantotto (1993), Galeazzo Ciano una tragedia fascista (1997), and Hitler e Mussolini: Gli anni degli incontri (1998). In the 1980s and 1990s, he had also signed television investigations for RAI and the screenplay for Fuga degli innocenti (2004) by Leone Pompucci, a 2004 film about Italian Jewish children who escaped Nazi persecution and took refuge in the Palestine region. For RAI, he edited the series Il coraggio e la pietà, which was created with the advice of fellow historian and personal friend Renzo De Felice. In interviews with witnesses and survivors, including the chief rabbi of Rome Elio Toaff, it told the history of Italian Jews after the promulgation of the Italian racial laws. On the same topic, he wrote the book Gli ebrei e l'Italia durante la guerra 1940 (Bonacci, 1986). Among his other books on Italian fascism are Tutti gli uomini del Duce (Mondadori, 1982).

== Personal life and death ==
Caracciolo was married to Rossella Sleiter, who worked as a journalist at La Repubblica and continues to edit the Friday column "Nature". He died in Rome on 24 April 2020, aged 88. The announcement of his death was given by Italia Nostra. He died in the Villa Margherita clinic, where he had been hospitalized for about a week after his condition had worsened.
