= Marella Agnelli =

Italian noblewoman, socialite, and art collector (1927–2019)

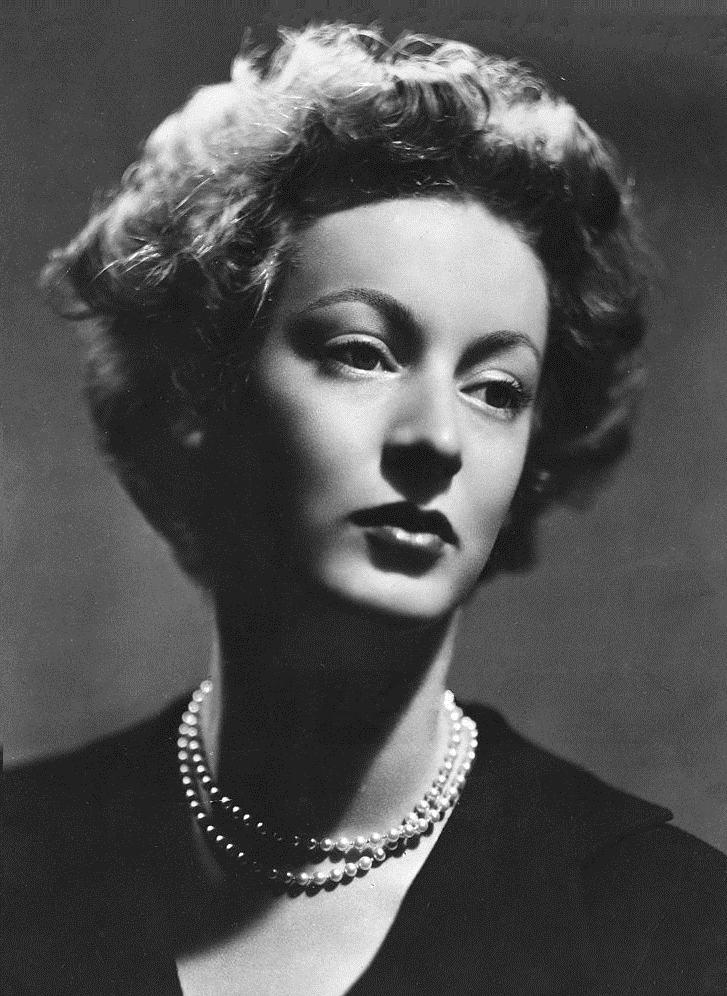
- Marella Agnelli in the 1950s
- Born: Princess Marella Caracciolo di Castagneto; 4 May 1927; Florence, Italy
- Died: 23 February 2019 (aged 91); Turin, Italy
- Spouse: Gianni Agnelli (m. 1953; died 2003)
- Issue: Edoardo Agnelli; Countess Margherita Agnelli de Pahlen
- House: Caracciolo
- Father: Filippo Caracciolo, 8th Prince of Castagneto, 3rd Duke of Melito, Patrician of Naples
- Mother: Margaret Clarke
- Occupation: Art collector; socialite; writer; landscape designer; garden designer; photographer

Marella Agnelli (Italian pronunciation: [maˈrɛlla aɲˈɲɛlli]; born Donna Marella Caracciolo di Castagneto [ˈdɔnna maˈrɛlla kaˈrattʃolo di kastaɲˈɲeːto]; 4 May 1927 – 23 February 2019) was an Italian noblewoman, art collector, socialite, style icon, and wife of Fiat S.p.A. chairman Gianni Agnelli. She often appeared in the fashion magazine Vogue. She was named to the International Best Dressed Hall of Fame List in 1963.

== Background ==
Donna Marella Caracciolo di Castagneto was born in Florence, Kingdom of Italy, as a member of the House of Caracciolo of the high Italian nobility and aristocracy. Her father was Don Filippo Caracciolo, 8th Prince of Castagneto, 3rd Duke of Melito, and hereditary Patrician of Naples (1903–1965), from an old noble Neapolitan family dating back to the Kingdom of Naples; he took part in the Italian resistance movement, was the executive secretary of the National Liberation Committee, an undersecretary of the Italian Ministry of Foreign Affairs in the Second Badoglio government, helped overcome objections for the Italian Communist Party to join the government, became secretary for the Action Party, and was general-secretary of the Council of Europe.

Agnelli's mother was Margaret Clarke (1898–1955), of Peoria, Illinois, United States, and Rockford, Illinois, the heiress of a well-known family of whiskey producers; she hung her mother's portraits in roomscapes of wicker furniture and sprigged cotton. She had two brothers: Don Carlo Caracciolo (1925–2008), who inherited their father's titles in 1965 and founded the Gruppo Editoriale L'Espresso and newspaper La Repubblica, and was known as "a prince among newspaper editors", or as "the editor prince", a reference to his aristocratic birth and elegant manner; and Don Nicola Caracciolo (1931–2020), the holder of both titles since 2008, as 10th Prince of Castagneto, 5th Duke of Melito, and hereditary Patrician of Naples. They grew up in Rome and Turkey, and spoke Italian, French, and English.

== Family ==
She was married in Osthoffen, where she had resided in Château Gruvel with her family, to Gianni Agnelli, the Fiat tycoon who was widely referred to as "the uncrowned king of Italy", on 19 November 1953. The page boys were Rodrigo Brandolini of the Brandolini family, Cristiano Rattazzi, and Prince Egon von Fürstenberg; the flower girls were Violante Caracciolo, Allegra Caracciolo, and Samaritana Rattazzi. They were married until his death on 24 January 2003. In their 50-year marriage, they had two children and eight grandchildren:

- Edoardo Agnelli (9 July 1954 – 15 November 2000)
- Countess Margherita Agnelli de Pahlen (born 26 October 1955); married first in 1975 (divorcing in 1981) to Alain Elkann (born 23 March 1950) and second in 1981 to a Russian nobleman, Count Sergei de Pahlen (born in 1944)
  - John Philip Jacob Elkann (born 1 April 1976), married on 4 September 2004 Italian noblewoman Donna Lavinia Ida Borromeo Arese Taverna (born 10 March 1977)
    - Leone Mosé Elkann (born 27 August 2006)
    - Oceano Noah Elkann (born 11 November 2007)
    - Vita Talita Elkann (born 23 January 2012)
  - Lapo Edovard Elkann (born 7 October 1977), married on 7 October 2021 to Portuguese rally racer Joana Lemos (born 24 April 1973)
  - Ginevra Elkann (born 24 September 1979), married on 25 April 2009 Italian aristocrat Don Giovanni Gaetani dell'Aquila d'Aragona (born 2 May 1973)
    - Don Giacomo Gaetani dell'Aquila d'Aragona (born 15 August 2009)
    - Don Pietro Gaetani dell'Aquila d'Aragona (born 31 October 2012)
    - Donna Marella Gaetani dell'Aquila d'Aragona (born 27 May 2014)
  - Countess Maria de Pahlen (born in 1983)
  - Count Pierre de Pahlen (born in 1986)
  - Countess Sophie de Pahlen (born in 1988)
  - Countess Anna de Pahlen (born in 1988)
  - Countess Tatiana de Pahlen (born in 1990)

Into the 2020s, the de Pahlens remain involved in a dispute with the Elkanns over Agnelli's inheritance.

== Career ==
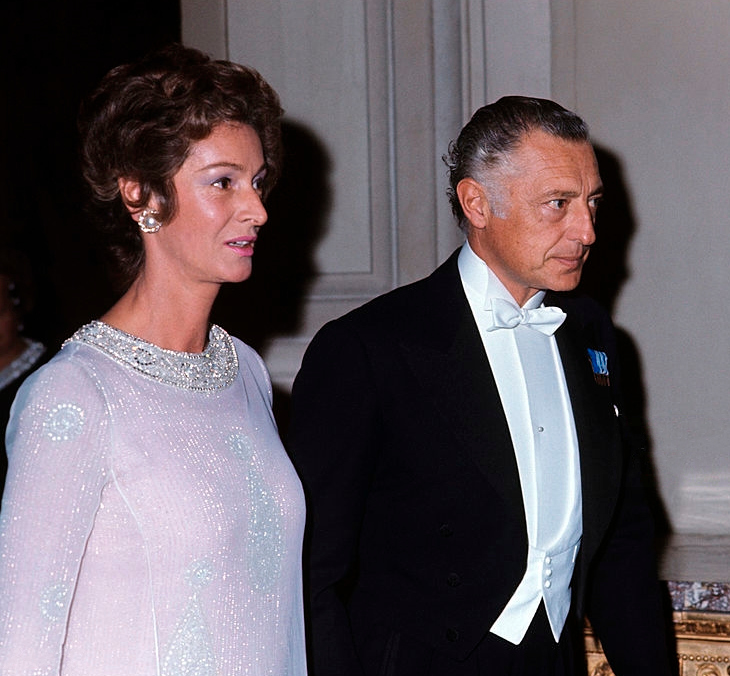
Marella and Gianni Agnelli in 1966

After Agnelli obtained her diploma in Switzerland, she was educated in Paris, where she attended the Académie des Beaux-Arts and then the Académie Julian in Paris. As part of her varied career, which included photography, design, and art collection, as well as a modeling career, Agnelli began her photography career as an assistant to Erwin Blumenfeld in New York City, where she lived on Park Avenue on the Upper East Side. When she returned to Italy, Agnelli was also an occasional editor and photographic contributor to Vogue and Condé Nast, among other magazines. In 1973, she created a textile line for Abraham-Zumsteg, for which she was awarded the Resources Council's Roscoe (the design trade's equivalent of the Oscar) in 1977. This was followed by work for the Ratti in Como, Steiner factories in France, and for Martex and numerous others for Marshall Field's in the United States. She specialized in furnishing fabrics.

An avid gardener, Agnelli authored a number of books on the subject, also providing many of the photographs. Two of her books are about the Agnelli Gardens at Villar Perosa, such as The Agnelli Gardens at Villar Perosa: Two Centuries of a Family Retreat (1998), and the Garden of Ninfa, such as Il giardino di Ninfa (1999). Into the 21st century, she oversaw the opening of the Renzo Piano-designed art gallery Pinacoteca Giovanni e Marella Agnelli, built on the roof of the former Lingotto Fiat factory in Turin. The Agnelli collection includes Picasso, Renoir, Canaletto, Matisse, and Canova masterpieces, and opened in 2002. The gallery also puts on temporary modern art exhibitions. She commissioned art from the likes of Andy Warhol and Richard Avedon.

In 1970, Agnelli founded the National Commission of United World Colleges. She was a member of the International Board of Trustees of the Salk Institute for Biological Studies in San Diego, California, and of the International Council of the Museum of Modern Art in New York. Among others, she was also vice-president of the Council of Palazzo Grassi in Venice, as well as president of I 200 del Fai in Milan and of the Association of Turin Friends of Contemporary Art in Turin.

== The Swans ==
The reserved, patrician tastemaker, and socialite Agnelli was known for her inclusion in Truman Capote's the Swans, a circle of wealthy, stylish, and well-married women friends whose company he adored because, in his words, they "had created themselves, as he had done", and "had stories to tell". According to Capote, Agnelli was "the European swan numero uno", one of the youngest in a group that included Babe Paley, Gloria Guinness, C. Z. Guest, Slim Keith, Pamela Harriman, Lee Radziwill, and Jacqueline Kennedy Onassis. In her autobiography, Washington Post publisher and Capote friend Katharine Graham recounted that the author once told her that if Paley and Agnelli were "both in Tiffany's window, Marella would be more expensive." Agnelli herself was nicknamed the Swan by Richard Avedon for a 1949 photograph that appeared on Vogue; Agnelli was among the notable photos Avedon took. Her other nickname, the Last Swan, was coined by Capote.

== Death ==
After a long illness, Agnelli died at the age of 91 on 23 February 2019 at her home in Turin; the announcement was made by her family. Days prior to her death, Agnelli's health deteriored, and the cause of death was ruled to be from complications of Parkinson's disease; she had been in a condition of invalidity for several years, and in her last months she was artificially fed. The funeral was held in a strictly private form on 25 February 2019 in the church of San Pietro in Vincoli at Villar Perosa. At the end of the ritual, her body was buried in the family chapel in the city cemetery. Among others, she was mourned by association football club Juventus, which is owned by the Agnelli family.

== Popular culture ==
Agnelli was portrayed in the American biographical film Infamous (2006) by Isabella Rossellini.

== Books ==
- Agnelli, Marella; Bright, Robert Emmett; Forquet, Federico; Pietromarchi, Luca (24 September 1987). Gardens of the Italian Villas. New York: Rizzoli USA. ISBN 978-0-8478-0825-0.
- Agnelli, Marella; Caracciolo, Marella; Pietromarchi, Giuppi (1997). Ninfa ieri e oggi (in Italian). Turin: Allemandi. ISBN 88-422-0718-7.
- Agnelli, Marella (30 September 1998). Giardino segreto (in Italian). Milano: Rizzoli. ISBN 88-17-67997-6.
- Agnelli, Marella; Caracciolo, Marella; Pejrone, Paolo (15 October 1998). The Agnelli Gardens at Villar Perosa: Two Centuries of a Family Retreat. New York: Harry Abrams. ISBN 978-0-8109-1979-2.
- Agnelli, Marella (2000). Il giardino di Ninfa (in Italian). Turin: Allemandi. ISBN 88-422-0542-7.
- Agnelli, Marella; Caracciolo Chia, Marella (14 October 2014). Marella Agnelli: The Last Swan. New York: Rizzoli USA. ISBN 978-0-8478-4321-3.
- Agnelli, Marella; Caracciolo Chia, Marella (15 October 2014). Ho coltivato il mio giardino (in Italian). Milan: Piccola Biblioteca Adelphi. ISBN 978-8-8459-2943-4.
- Agnelli, Marella (2015). La Signora Gocà (in Italian). Milano: Piccola Biblioteca Adelphi. ISBN 978-8-8459-3040-9.

== Honours ==
- Grand Officer Order of Merit of the Italian Republic, the third-highest civil honour in Italy, it was awarded by then president Carlo Azeglio Ciampi on 13 September 2000.

== Ancestry ==
Ancestors of Marella Agnelli

16. Nicola Caracciolo, 4th Prince of Castagneto
8. Filippo Caracciolo, 1st Duke of Melito
17. Donna Emanuela Caracciolo dei Marchesi di Sant'Eramo
4. Nicola Caracciolo, 2nd Duke of Melito
18. Gennaro Compagna, Baron Compagna
9. Emilia Compagna
19. Giulia dei Baroni Pandola
2. Filippo Caracciolo, 8th Prince of Castagneto, 3rd Duke of Melito
20. Francesco Mele Barese
10. Ippolito Mele Barese
21. Antoinette de Salles
5. Meralda Mele Barese
22. Winthrop Mackworth-Praed
11. Elizabeth Lilian Mackworth-Praed
23. Helen Bogle
1. Marella Caracciolo di Castagneto
12. Charles S. Clarke
6. Charles Corning Clarke
26. Elias Clippenger Randall
13. Melissa Mindwell Randall
27. Mindwell Corning
3. Margaret Clarke
28. Charles Chandler
14. Charles Emmet Chandler
29. Mary Carol Rickard
7. Alice Chandler
30. Alfred Beard
15. Cordelia Beard
31. Aurelia Crom
