= Dan Pearson (garden designer) =

English garden designer

Dan Pearson OBE
- Born: Dan Pearson; 9 April 1964 (age 62)
- Citizenship: British
- Education: RHS Garden Wisley (Wisley Cert.(Hons)); Royal Botanic Gardens, Kew (Kew Dip.(Hons))
- Occupations: Garden designer; Garden writer; Landscape designer
- Website: www.danpearsonstudio.com

Dan Pearson OBE (born 9 April 1964) is an English landscape designer, specialising in naturalistic perennial planting.

== Early life ==
Pearson was brought up in an Arts and Crafts house on the Hampshire–Sussex border. His father is a painter who taught fine art at Portsmouth Polytechnic and his mother taught fashion and textiles at Winchester School of Art.

Pearson was employed at a weekend gardening job for Mrs. Pumphrey at Greatham Mill Gardens, Hampshire, which cultivated his interest in gardening. Backed by his parents, at 17, he decided against going to art college and dropped out of his A levels to go to the RHS Garden, Wisley. This was approved by his parents and he became a RHS Wisley trainee on the certificate course. Pearson attended the Royal Botanic Garden Edinburgh for a year to work in the Rock Garden and the Woodland Garden and went on to complete the three-year Kew Gardens course. Following this he returned to his role maintaining Frances Mossman's garden at Home Farm in Northampton. Mossman was the creative force behind Next and, later, George at Asda and at Wedgwood. Pearson also undertook student scholarships studying wildflower communities in the Picos de Europa, Spain, and in the Himalayas.

When he was 25 he was named house garden designer at the Conran Shop on London's Fulham Road. Pearson set up his garden design business in 1987.

== Personal life ==
Pearson's younger brother, Luke, is a product and furniture designer and a partner in the company Pearsonlloyd.

In 2010 Pearson and Huw Morgan restored a late 18th-century house (a 1,500-square-foot two-storey buff-coloured stone building with small windows and two chimneys on a red-tiled roof,) with 20 acres of land outside Bath as their home and workplace, called Hillside. In a broadcast interview with Kirsty Young on BBC Radio 4's Desert Island Discs, Pearson stated that he has known Morgan since the 1990s.

== Career ==
Since 2002 he has designed gardens and has given lectures around the world, including in the UK, Italy, US and Japan. He has designed gardens for Jonathan Ive, Paul Smith, venture capitalist Walter Kortschak, art dealer Ivor Braka, real estate businessman Vladislav Doronin, Torrecchia Vecchia for Carlo Caracciolo (the late owner of the Italian newspaper l'Espresso), and his colleague on The Guardian newspaper, Nigel Slater (this garden was a joint effort with Monty Don). He restored the landscape at Althorp House (after Diana's death) after 1997 and worked on the landscape for the Millennium Dome. He has worked at the Botanic Garden of Jerusalem. He designed the roof garden of Roppongi Hills in Japan in 2002. Another large project was the Tokachi Millennium Forest Garden, in Shimizu, Hokkaido, which was featured on the BBC Radio 4 programme Designed in Britain, Built in Japan. Another project is Maggie's Centre in Charing Cross, London. In 2020, he designed a new courtyard garden for the Garden Museum in London.

Pearson has curated six show gardens at the RHS Chelsea Flower Show including in 1992, 1993, 1994, 1996 (with an outstanding roof garden), and 2004 (for Merrill Lynch). In May 2015, he returned to Chelsea Flower Show with the "Laurent-Perrier Chatsworth Garden", inspired by the Chatsworth estate in Derbyshire. It won a gold medal and "Best in Show".

He has working relationships with architects and architectural firms in the UK including Zaha Hadid, Rogers Stirk Harbour + Partners, Feilden Clegg Bradley Studios, David Chipperfield Architects, and 6a Architects, London. Pearson was elected a Royal Designer for Industry in 2012. Pearson was the horticultural advisor for Thomas Heatherwick's cancelled Garden Bridge, over the Thames in London.

== Television and radio ==
Pearson has presented and appeared in several TV series on BBC Two, Channel 4 and Channel 5. In 1992, he presented his first garden makeover programme, Garden Doctors. A book of the same name later followed the series. He presented Dan Pearson: Routes around the World on Channel 4, a six-part travel and horticultural series by Flashback Productions, in 1997. In 2001, the BBC filmed a 12-part series, A Year At Home Farm, in Northampton, for which Dan had been designing the gardens since 1987. A book later also followed the series. He appears occasionally on BBC's Gardeners' World, and also regularly talks on radio, including appearing on Front Row on BBC Radio 4 about the Royal Academy's 2016 exhibition "Painting the Garden: Monet to Matisse".

== Writing ==
Pearson has written for The Guardian, The Telegraph (during 2003–2006) and The Sunday Times on the subject of landscaping and home gardening. He was the garden columnist for The Observer Magazine from 2006 to 2015. He sits on the editorial board of Gardens Illustrated magazine and also writes for Gardeners' World magazine.

=== Books ===
- Pearson, Dan (1996). Garden Doctors (A Channel Four book). Boxtree Press Ltd. ISBN 978-0752210292. Co-authored with Steve Bradley
- Pearson, Dan (27 February 1998). The Essential Garden Book. Conran Octopus Ltd. ISBN 978-1850299196. Co-authored with Sir Terence Conran
- Pearson, Dan (4 January 2001). The Garden: A Year at Home Farm. Ebury Press. ISBN 978-0091870324.
- Pearson, Dan (3 October 2011) [First published 28 September 2009 (as hardback)]. Spirit: Garden Inspiration. FUEL. ISBN 978-0956356291. Introduction by Beth Chatto
- Pearson, Dan (7 March 2011). Home Ground: Sanctuary in the City. Conran Octopus. ISBN 978-1840915372.
- Pearson, Dan (4 May 2017). Natural Selection: A Year in the Garden. Faber and Faber. ISBN 978-1783351176.
- with Midori Shintani Tokachi Millennium Forest: Pioneering a New Way of Gardening with Nature (Filbert Press, 2021)

== Honours ==
Pearson is a tree ambassador for The Tree Council and a member of the Society of Garden Designers. In 2011, he was elected an honorary fellow of the Royal Institute of British Architects and was a member of the jury for the 2011 RIBA Stirling Prize. At the Garden Media Guild Awards of 2011, he was awarded the prize for 'Inspirational Book of the Year'.

The Garden Museum in Lambeth, London, held an exhibition on his work in 2013. Pearson created a new planting design for the border in front of the Museum.

He was the Winner of the House and Garden Garden Designer of the Year award in 2019 and is listed in House and Garden as one of the top 50 garden designers in the UK.

Pearson was appointed Officer of the Order of the British Empire (OBE) in the 2022 New Year Honours for services to horticulture.
