= Jacques Lonchampt =

French music critic

Jacques Lonchampt (10 August 1925 in Lyon – 27 December 2014 in Paris) was a French music critic.

== Awards ==
- Chevalier de la Légion d'honneur.

== Publications ==
- Le Bon Plaisir : journal de musique contemporaine, Paris, ISBN 2-84110-001-4.
- Journal de musique, Paris, L'Harmattan.
- Voyage à travers l'opéra, Paris, L'Harmattan ISBN 2-7475-2896-0.
- Regards sur l'opéra : de Verdi à Georges Aperghis, Paris, L'Harmattan ISBN 2-7475-4052-9.
- Dictionnaire pratique des compositeurs et des œuvres musicales, Jeunesses musicales de France.
- Contribution to the extension of l'Histoire de la musique by Émile Vuillermoz, Paris, Le Livre de Poche, 1977, (out of print).
