= Castagneto =

- Frazione
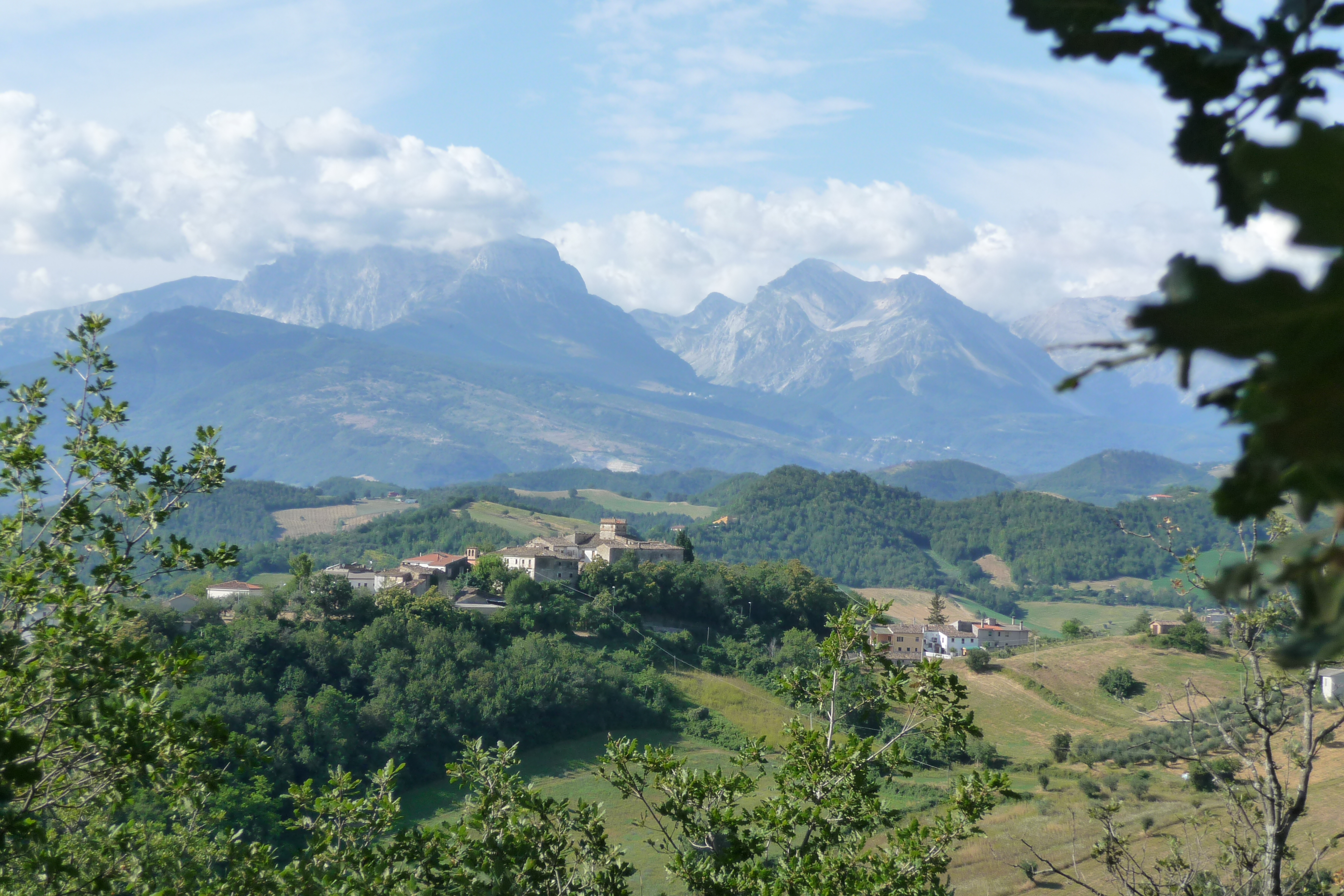
- Castagneto

- Location of Castagneto in Italy
- Coordinates: 42°37′N 13°36′E
- Country: Italy
- Region: Abruzzo
- Province: Teramo (TE)
- Comune: Teramo
- Demonym: Castagnetesi
- Time zone: UTC+1 (CET)
  - Summer (DST): UTC+2 (CEST)
- Dialing code: 0861
- Website: Official website

Castagneto is a frazione (outlying area) of the Italian city of Teramo. It is located approximately four miles from Teramo at the base of a mountain sub-range known as Monti della Laga. Nearby is a state highway, SP 50, which leads to the nearby village of Ioanella. There is historical evidence of the village dating back at least one millennium. Most of this evidence is contained in the records of the local church, Santa Maria de Praediis.

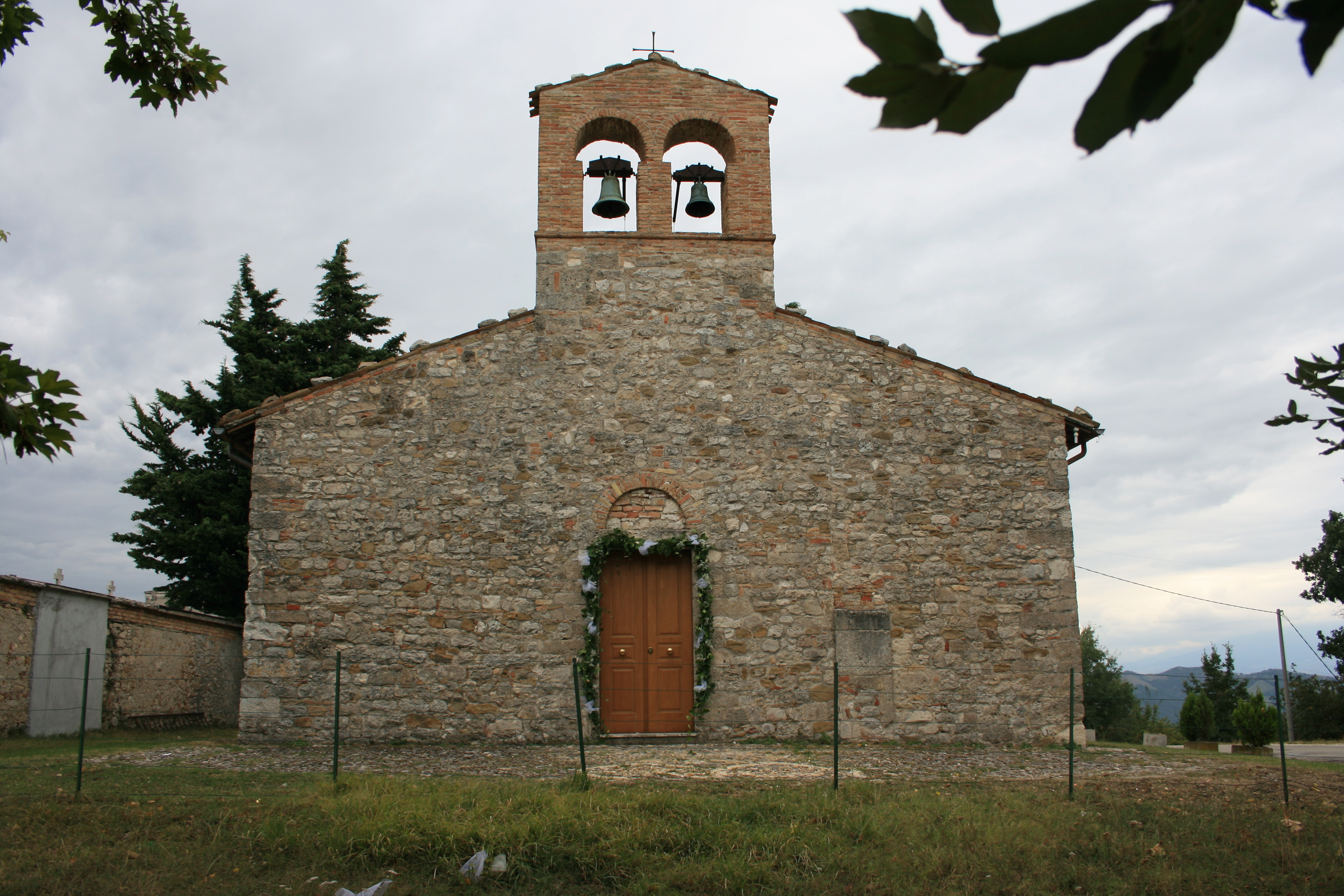
S. Maria de Praediis, castagneto, Teramo, Italy

== Overview ==
From Castagneto, looking to the east one has view of the Adriatic Sea. In the opposite direction is a view of the Gran Sasso. Seen from Castagneto, the Gran Sasso is said to resemble a giant figure sleeping on his back with his face and nose pointing upward. At the highest elevation of Castagneto is an ancient palace belonging to the Ianuarii-Scaricamazza family, also known as Scaricamazza, and which still bears its name. It can be seen from miles around and is perhaps Castagneto's most visible and most well known landmark.

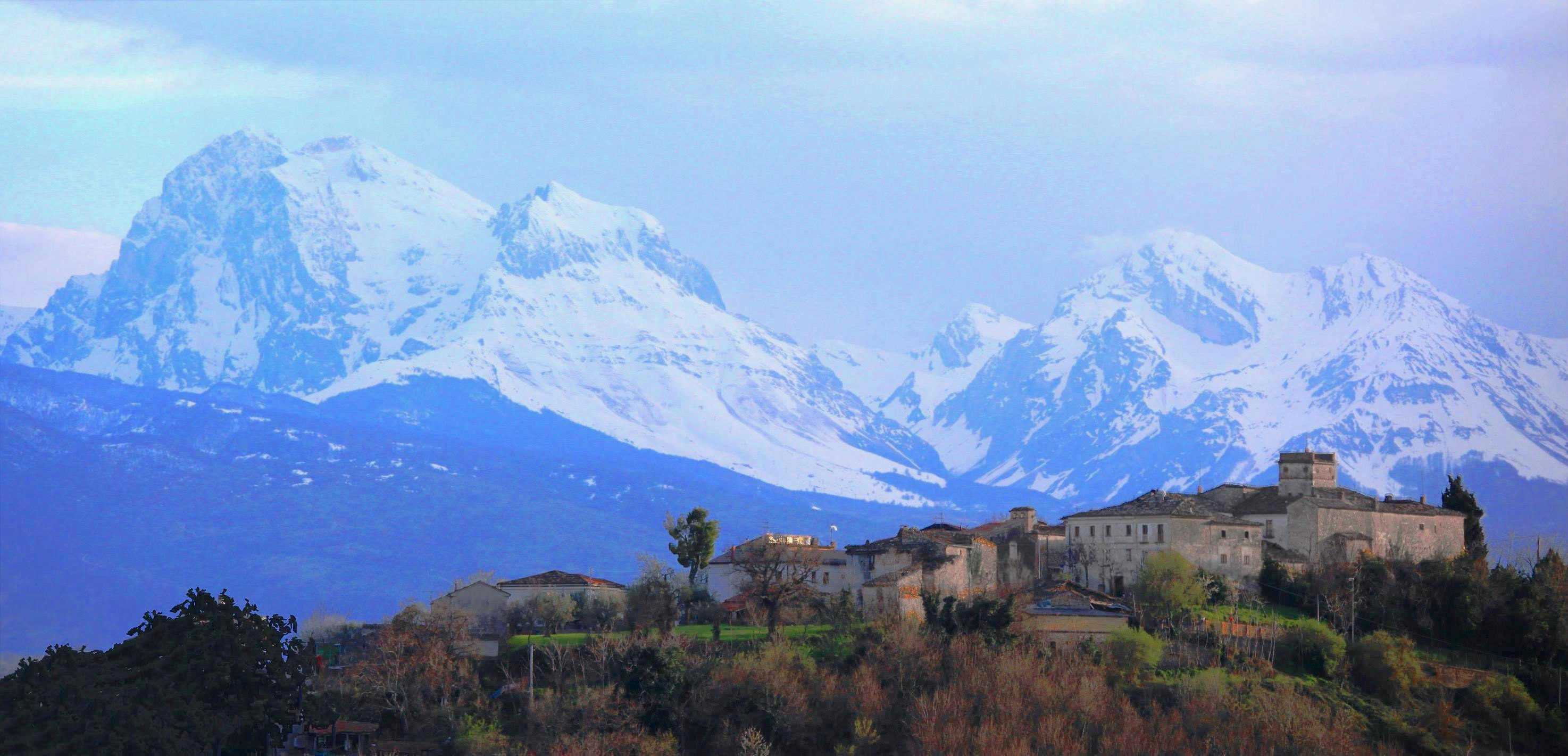
Scaricamazza Palace of Castagneto, Teramo, Italy.

Castagneto often serves as a point of reference with regard to several nearby clusters of houses including Pantaneto, Collecaruno, Collemarino, Collesansonesco e Fonte del Latte. In days past Castagneto was the seat of a Roman Catholic parrish. As recently as 1980, the village hosted a local elementary school. A post office remains open to this day.

Castagneto is currently the focal point and meeting place for a group of Teramo's "frazioni." The purpose of this group is to identify the needs of the local residents and work to see that the comune of Teramo provides the necessary funds and resources to meet these needs.
