= Grand Hotel Majestic =

Hotel in Verbania, Italy

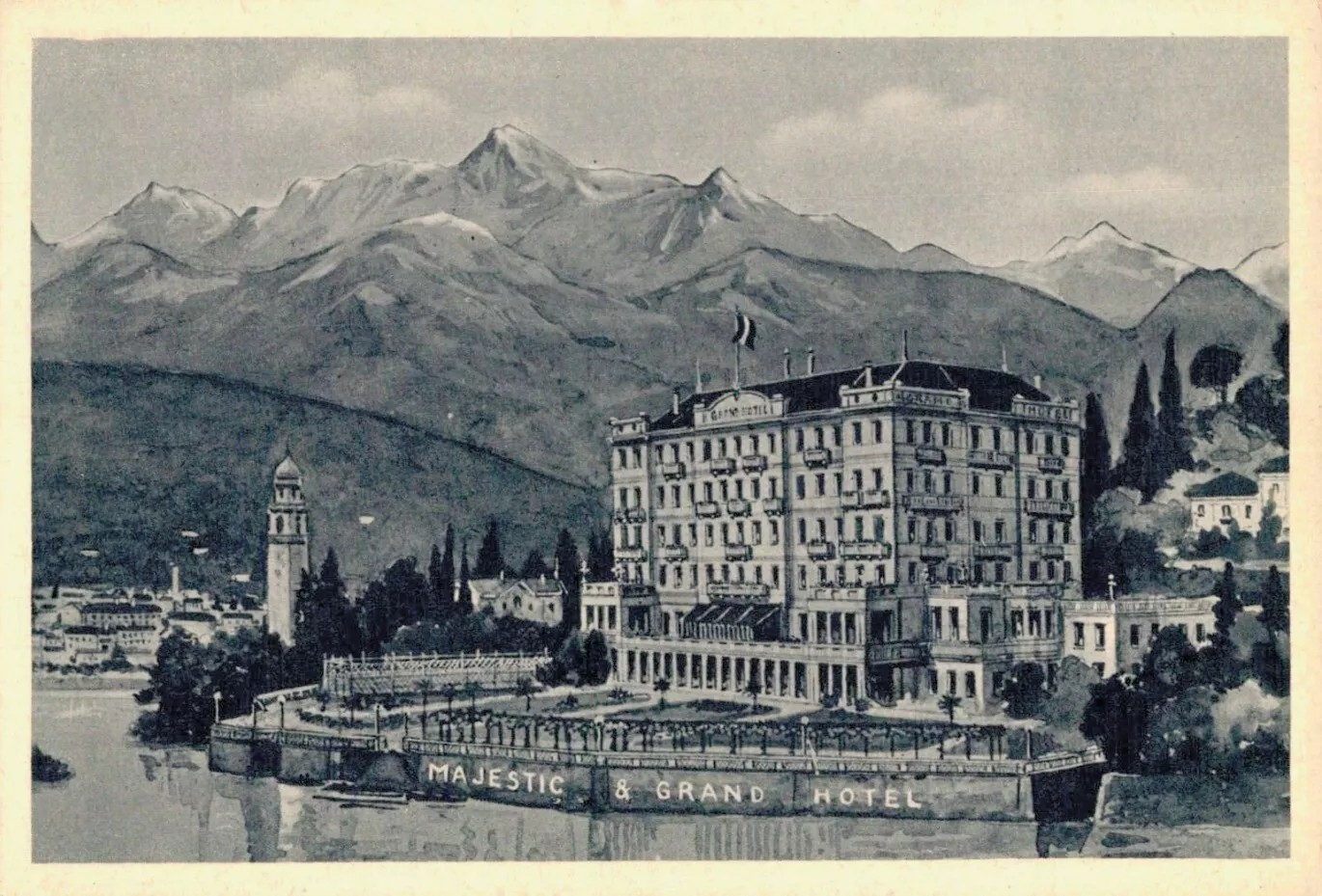
- Interactive map of the Grand Hotel Majestic area

General information
- Location: Verbania, Italy
- Coordinates: 45°55′02.29″N 8°33′27.29″E
- Opened: 1870; 156 years ago

Website
- www.grandhoteltremezzo.com/it/home/

The Grand Hotel Majestic is a historic luxury hotel located in Verbania, on the shores of Lake Maggiore, in Italy.

== History ==
Built in just fourteen months, the hotel was opened in 1870 as the Grand Hotel Pallanza on the initiative of George Seyschab, who had already taken part in the founding of the Grand Hotel des Iles Borromées in Stresa ten years earlier. The modern and newly built hotel, conceived to welcome an elite international clientele, immediately became a landmark of luxury hospitality on the Piedmontese side of Lake Maggiore.

The property was purchased in 1979 by Silvano Zuccari, an entrepreneur in the gas industry.

== Description ==
The building is located on a promontory in the village of Pallanza facing the Isolino di San Giovanni.
