= Scoglio della Malghera =

Island of the Borromean Islands

Coordinates: 45°53′34″N 8°31′26″E

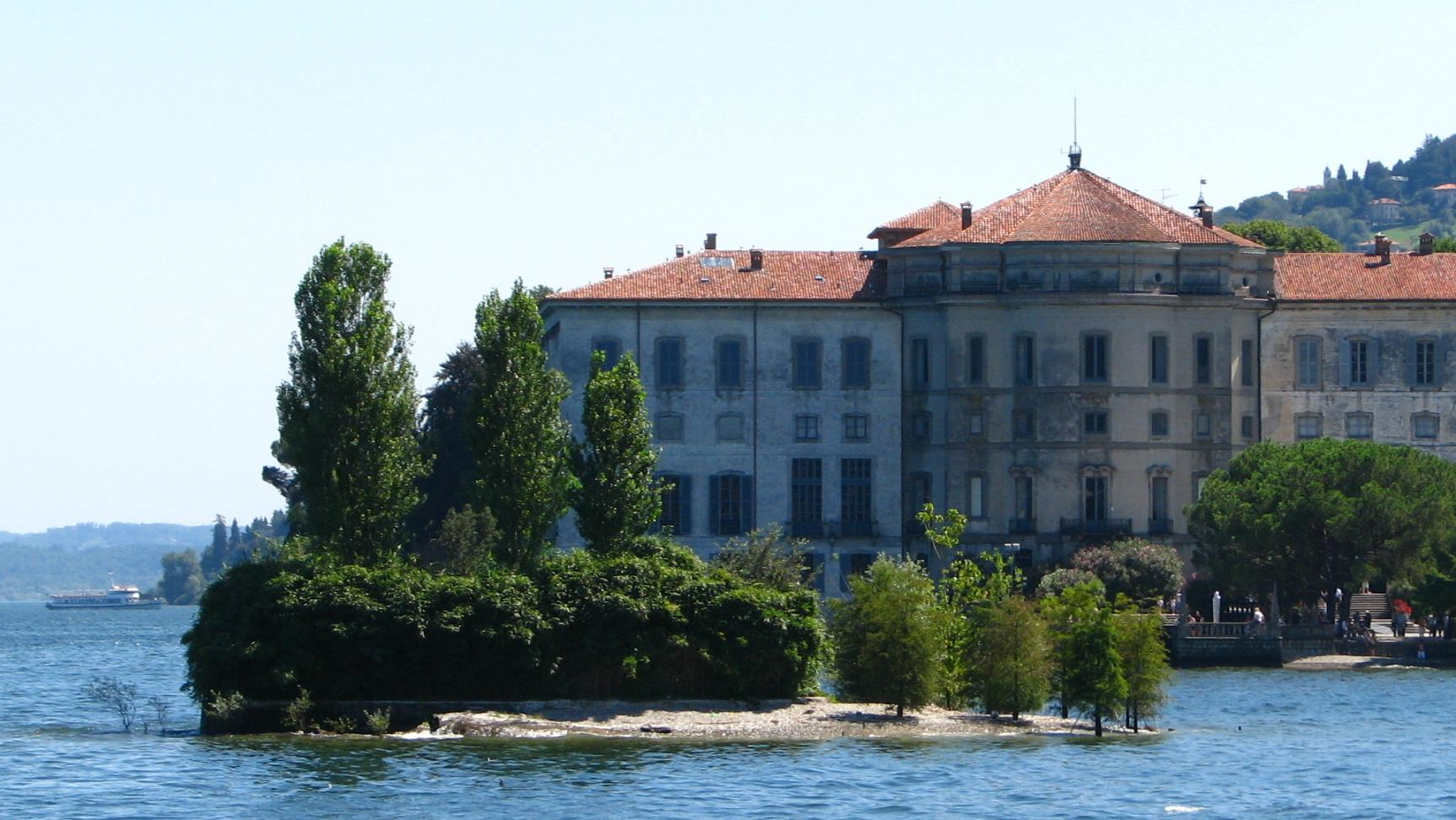

Geography
- Location: Lago Maggiore
- Archipelago: Borromean Islands

Administration
- Italy
- Region: Piedmont
- Province: Verbano-Cusio-Ossola
- Comune: Stresa

Demographics
- Population: 0 (not permanently inhabited)

The Scoglio della Malghera is a small island belonging to the Borromean Islands of Lake Maggiore, one of the main subalpine lakes of northern Italy. It is located halfway between Isola Bella and Isola dei Pescatori, in the comune of Stresa.
