= Giardini Botanici dell'Isola Madre =

Botanical garden in Italy

Coordinates: 45°54′40″N 8°32′16″E

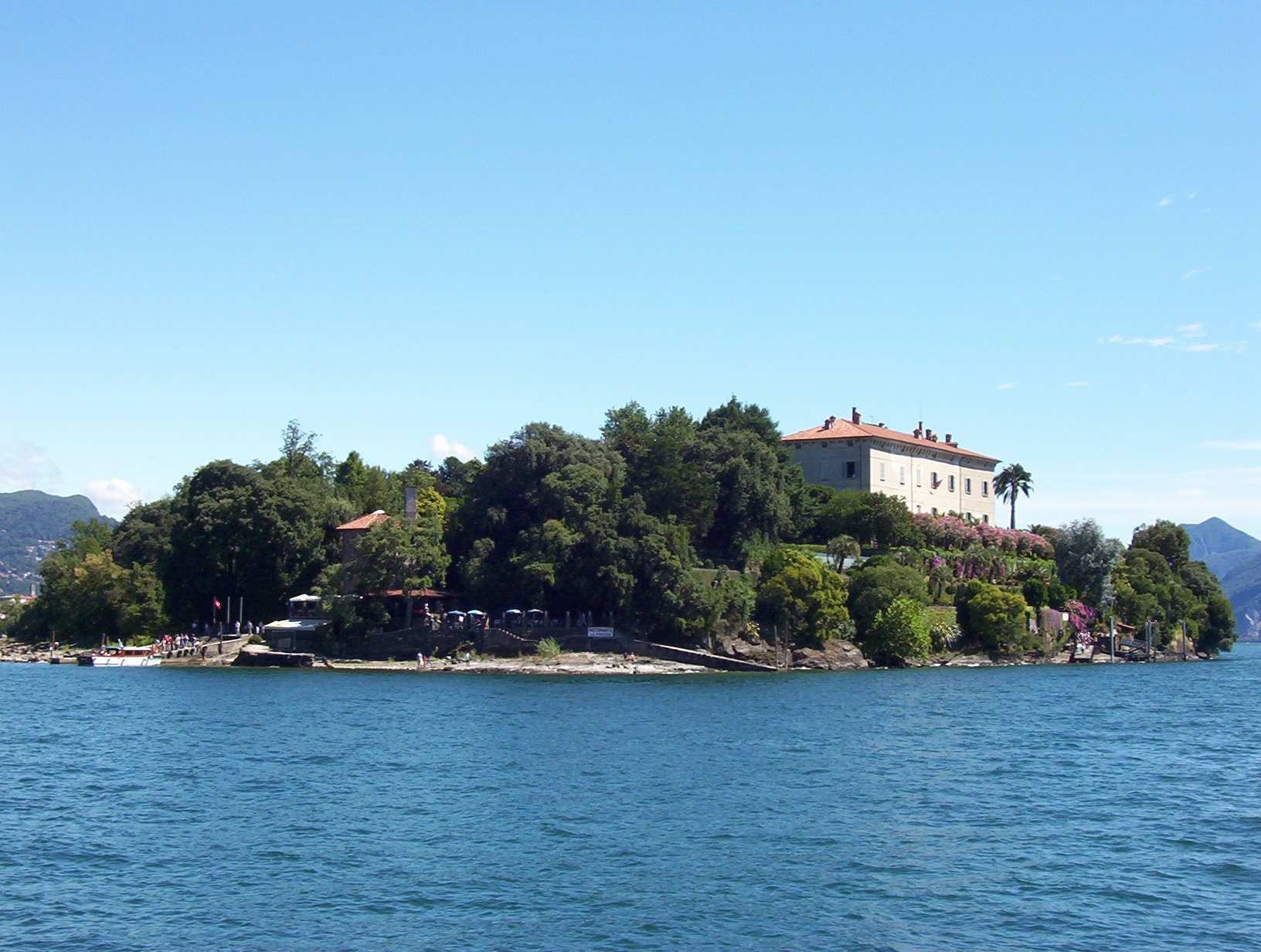
Giardini Botanici dell'Isola Madre

The Giardini Botanici dell'Isola Madre (8 hectares) are historic botanical gardens located on the grounds of Isola Madre in the Borromean Islands of Lake Maggiore, accessible by ferry from Stresa, Province of Verbano-Cusio-Ossola, Piedmont, Italy. They are open daily in the warmer months; an admission fee is charged.

The gardens extend in seven terraces across the small island of Isola Madre, originally inhabited by Count Lancillotto Borromeo in the early sixteenth century. They were designed for Count Vitaliano Borromeo all’Inglese (in the English style) in the late eighteenth century on the site of a citrus orchard, and have remained essentially unchanged since. Among their many visitors have been Napoleon Bonaparte, Gustave Flaubert, and Théophile Gautier. Principal gardens are as follows:

- Loggia del Cashmir - cypress trees
- Piano delle Camelie - One of the earliest camellia collections in Italy.
- Piazzale dei Pappagalli - parrots, peacocks, pheasants, etc.
- Piazzale della Cappella - family chapel, constructed 1858
- Piazzale della Darsena - rhododendron forest
- Prato dei Ginerium - Pampas Grass
- Prato del Pozzo - cornus, magnolia, maple, etc.
- Viale Africa - the island's sunny side.
- Viale delle Palme - a notable palm collection, with specimens up to 125 years old

== See also ==
- List of botanical gardens in Italy
