= Cannero =

Cannero may refer to:

- Cannero Riviera, comune in the Province of Verbano-Cusio-Ossola in the Italian region Piedmont
- Castelli di Cannero, three rocky islets of Lake Maggiore in northern Italy
