= Pier Giacomo Pisoni =

Italian historian (1928–1991)

Pier Giacomo Pisoni (8 July 1928 – 8 February 1991) was an Italian historian, paleographer and archivist.

Born in Germignaga near Luino, Italy, he devoted his work especially to the Middle Ages and modern local history of Lago Maggiore. He rediscovered and published the 14th century comment, which was given up for lost, on Dante's "Inferno" from the "Divina Commedia", written by Guglielmo Maramauro, Petrarca's friend ("Expositione sopra l'Inferno di Dante Alighieri"). Archivist of the Princes Borromeo, he transcribed and published several local epigraphs, documents, manuscripts, communal statutes, letters, and ancient account books (as the "Liber tabuli Vitaliani Bonromei"). He collected ancient popular tales; he published articles and books about Lombard history, monographs on artistic monuments or historical families, like the thrilling and curious story of brothers Mazzardi ("I fratelli della Malpaga"), five pirates who in the early 15th century settled in the castles of Cannero and terrorized the whole Lago Maggiore.
