= Villa La Palazzola =

Villa in Piedmont, Italy

Villa "La Palazzola" is located in Stresa, Italy near Lake Maggiore. An estate overlooks the Borromean Islands.

== History ==
The villa was built at the initiative of Count Flaviano Avogadro Casanova with the spacious garden of about two hectares. The first stone of the building was consecrated by Rosmini in June 1844. Over time, the villa's owners have changed: Casanova, Geyer, Belloni.

In 1951 the villa became the property of Bongiovanni Radice. Adolfo Pini, his successor, gave the villa to the city of Stresa on one condition: to create an art and culture fund.
