= Isolino di San Giovanni =

Island in Lake Maggiore, Italy

Coordinates: 45°55′00″N 8°33′19″E

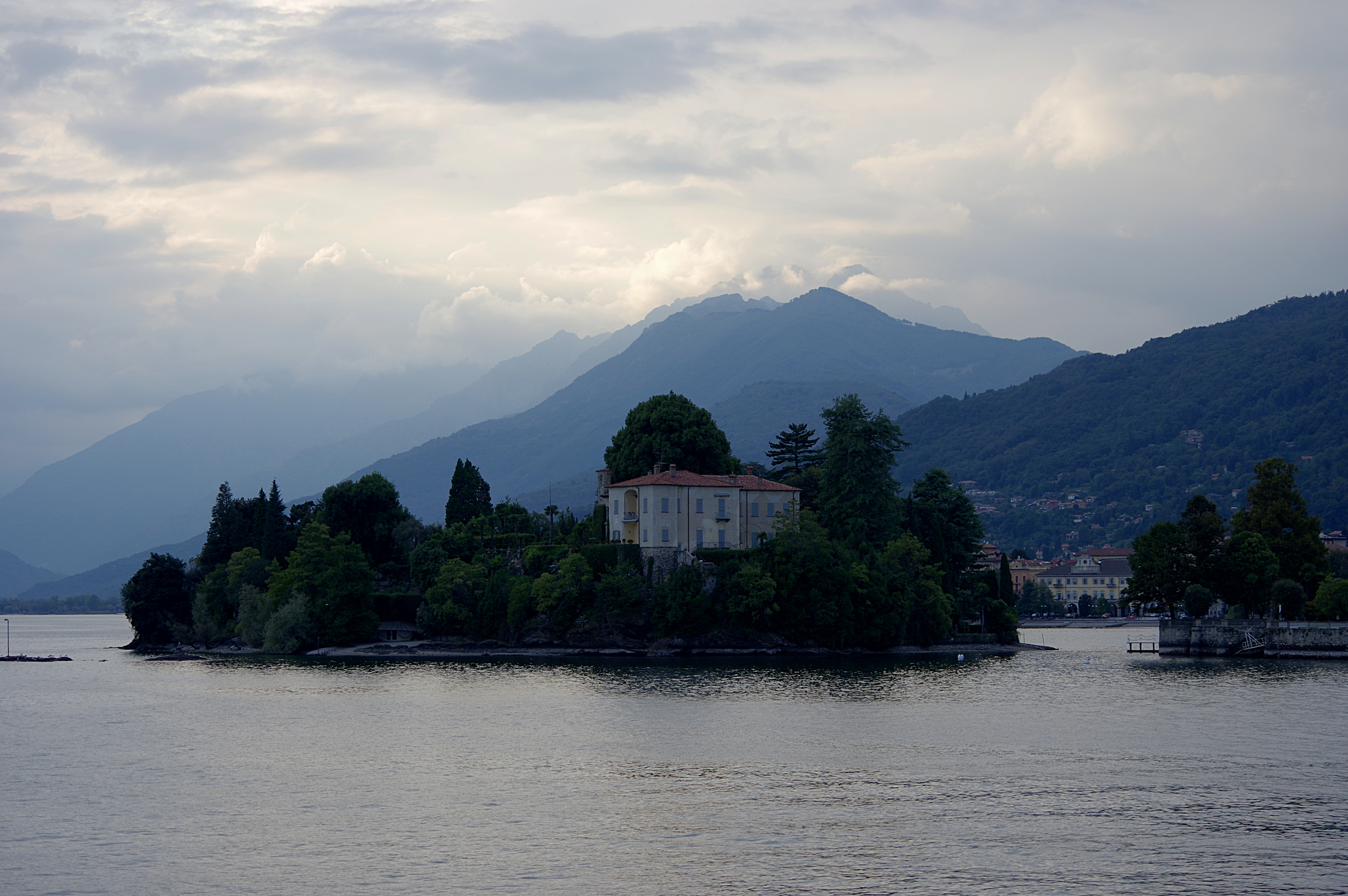

Geography
- Location: Lago Maggiore
- Archipelago: Borromean Islands
- Area: 0.4 ha (0.99 acres)

Administration
- Italy
- Region: Piedmont
- Province: Verbano-Cusio-Ossola
- Comune: Verbania
- Capital city: Isola dei Pescatori

Demographics
- Population: 0 (not permanently inhabited)

The Isolino di San Giovanni is a small island belonging to the Borromean group of Lake Maggiore, one of the main subalpine lakes of northern Italy. It is situated some way to the north of the others in the group, 30 metres west of the shoreline of Pallanza, a frazione of Verbania. It is part of the frazione Pallanza.

The earliest extant record of the island is from the year 999, when it was identified as Isola di Sant’Angelo, referring to a chapel dedicated to Saint Michael found within its castle. In the middle of the twelfth century the island was in the possession of counts belonging to the Barbavara di Gravellona family. The Borromeos made various attempts to obtain the Isolino di San Giovanni in the late sixteenth century with the aim of establishing a Barnabite college. They finally acquired it in 1632 and embellished it with a palazzo and gardens. Today the Borromean palazzo reflects for the most part its nineteenth-century aspect.

Its most famous resident was the conductor Arturo Toscanini who used the island as his summer home from 1932 to 1954 (excepting the years spanning World War II).
