= Isola Bella (Lago Maggiore) =

Island in Lake Maggiore, Italy

Coordinates: 45°53′43″N 8°31′38″E

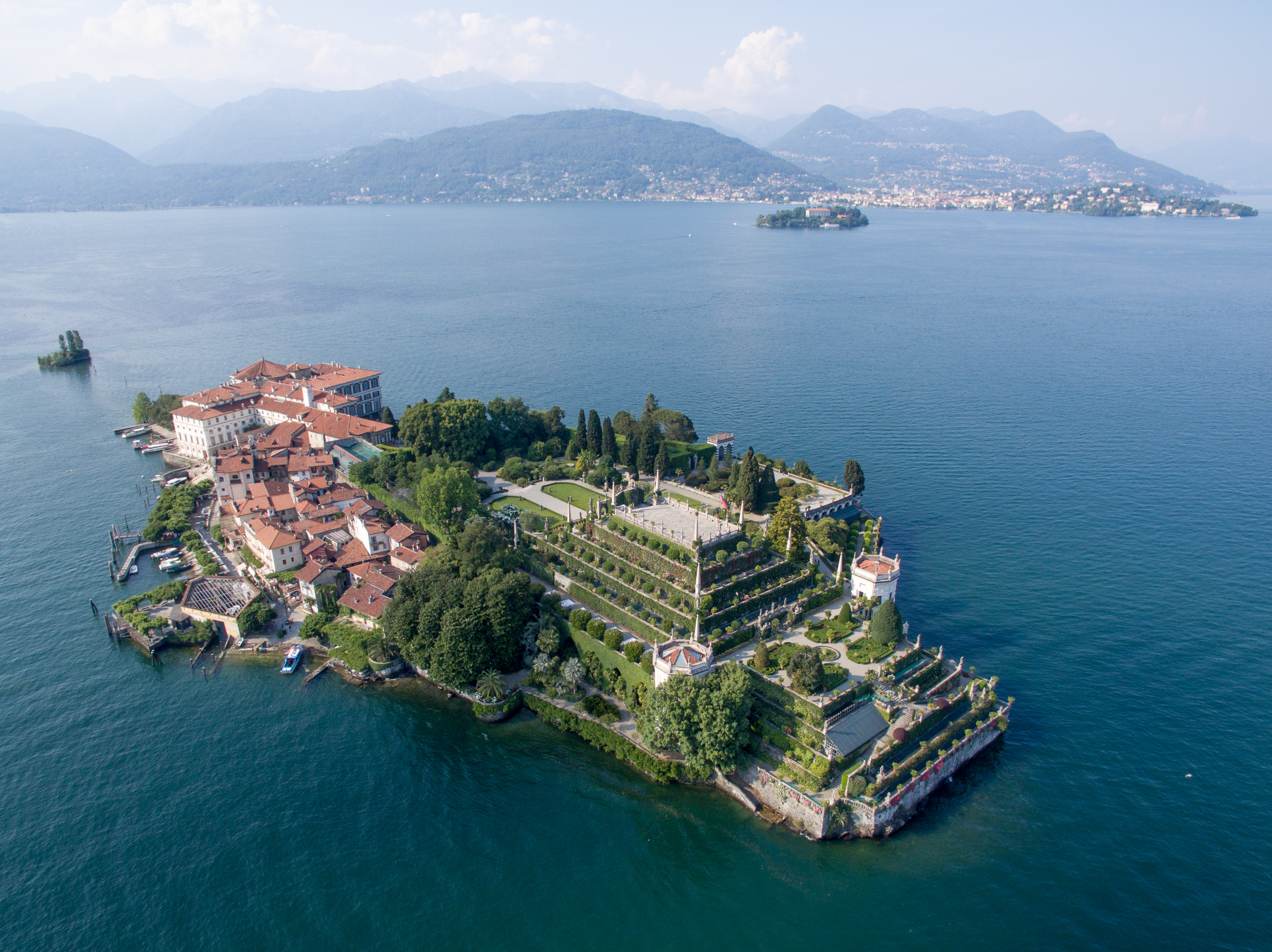
- Aerial view in 2017

Geography
- Location: Lago Maggiore
- Archipelago: Borromean Islands
- Area: 0.20 km^{2} (0.077 sq mi)
- Length: 0.32 km (0.199 mi)
- Width: 0.18 km (0.112 mi)

Administration
- Italy
- Region: Piedmont
- Province: Verbano-Cusio-Ossola

Isola Bella (lit. 'beautiful island') is one of the Borromean islands of Lake Maggiore in Northern Italy. The island is situated in the Borromean Gulf 400 metres from the lakeside town of Stresa. Isola Bella is 320 metres long by 400 metres wide and is divided between the Palace, its Italianate garden, and a small fishing village.

== History ==
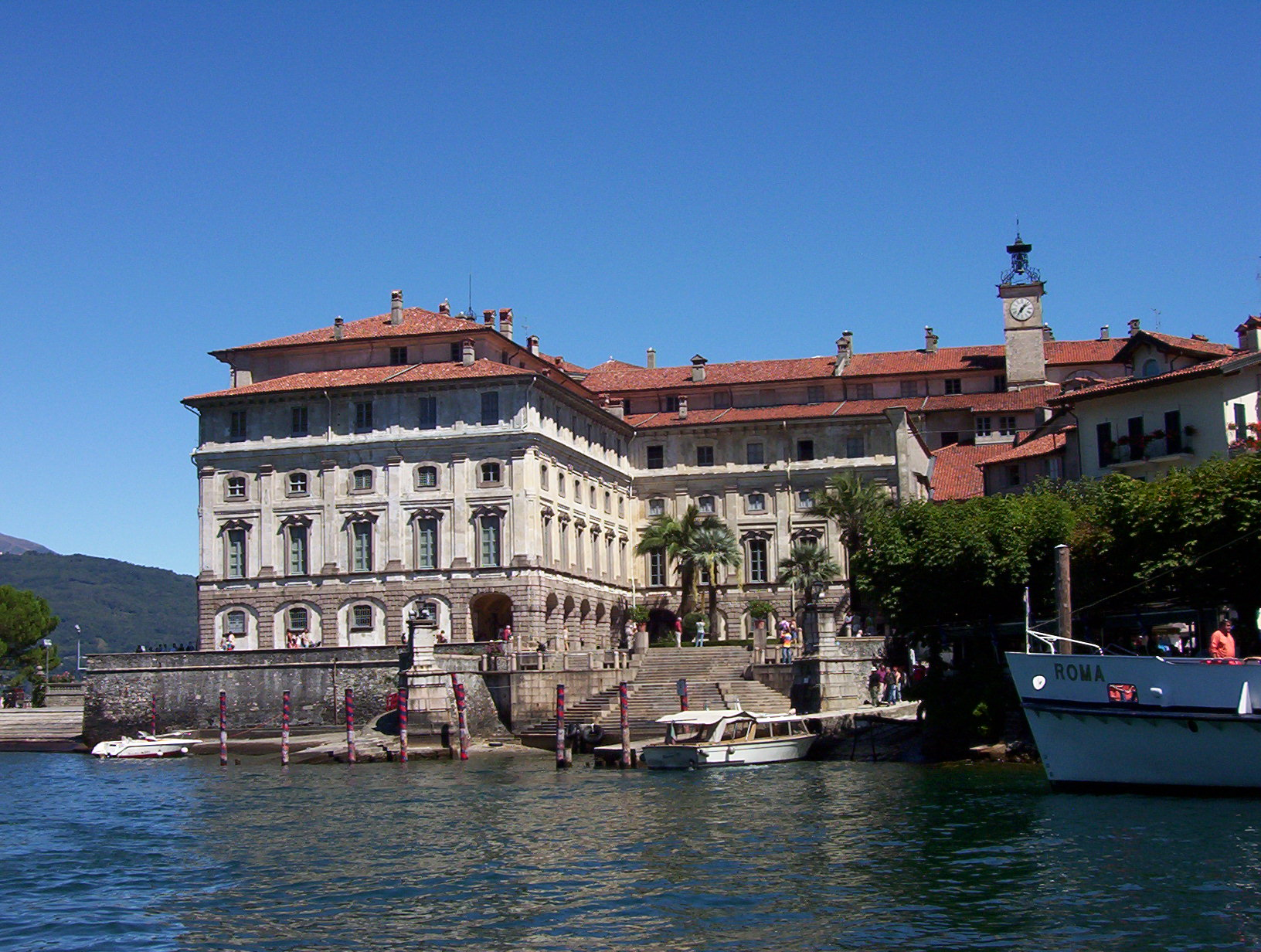
The palazzo

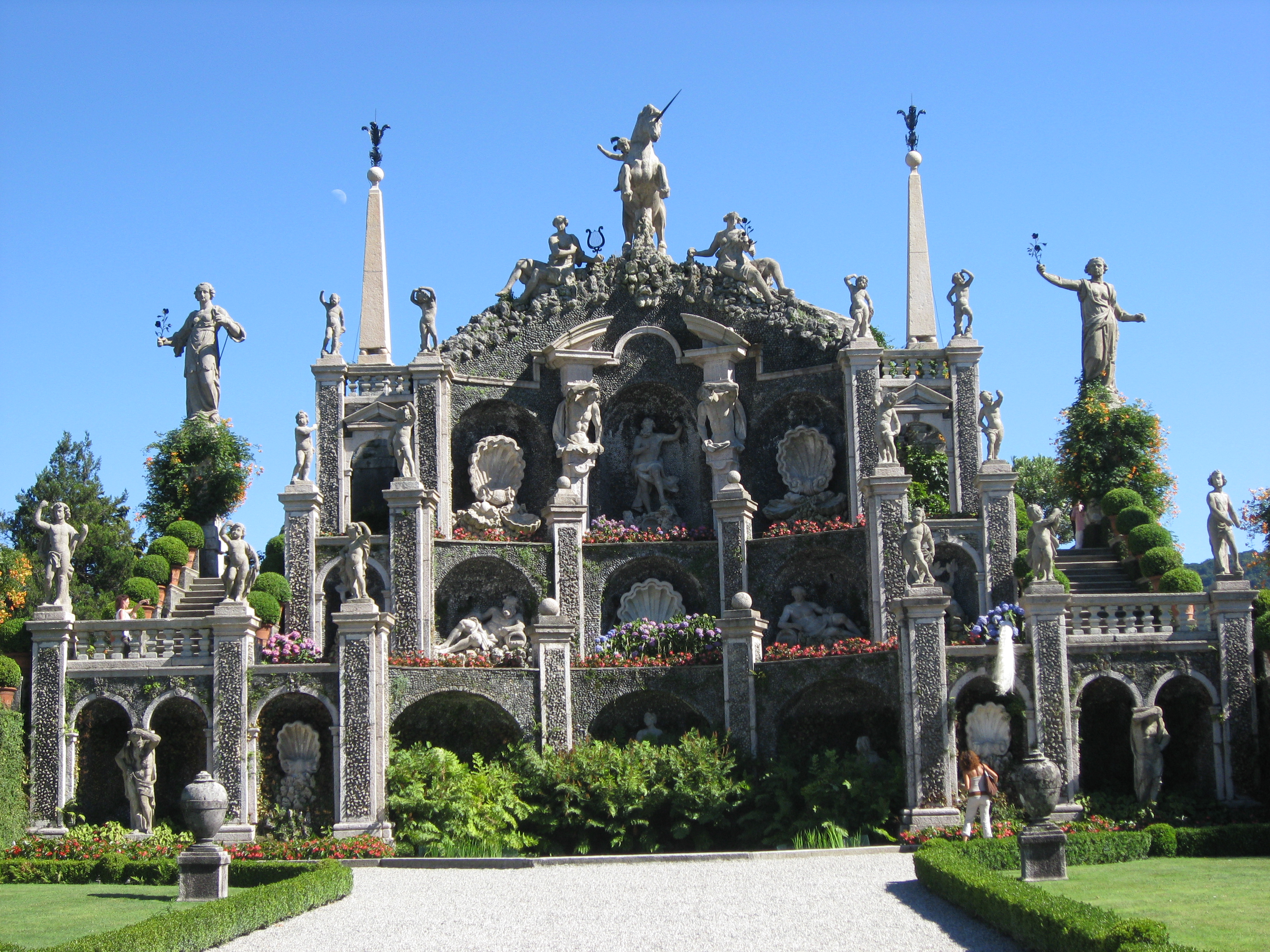
The gardens

Until 1632, the island—known only as l’isola inferiore or isola di sotto—was a rocky crag occupied by a tiny fishing village: but that year Carlo III of the influential House of Borromeo began the construction of a palazzo dedicated to his wife, Isabella D'Adda, from whom the island takes its name. He entrusted the works to the Milanese Angelo Crivelli, who was also to be responsible for planning the gardens. The works were interrupted around midcentury when the Duchy of Milan was struck by a devastating outbreak of the plague.

Construction resumed when the island passed to Carlo’s sons, Cardinal Giberto III (1615–1672) and Vitaliano VI (1620–1690); the latter in particular, with the financial backing of his elder brother, entrusted the completion of the works to the Milanese architect Carlo Fontana and turned the villa into a place of sumptuous parties and theatrical events for the nobility of Europe.

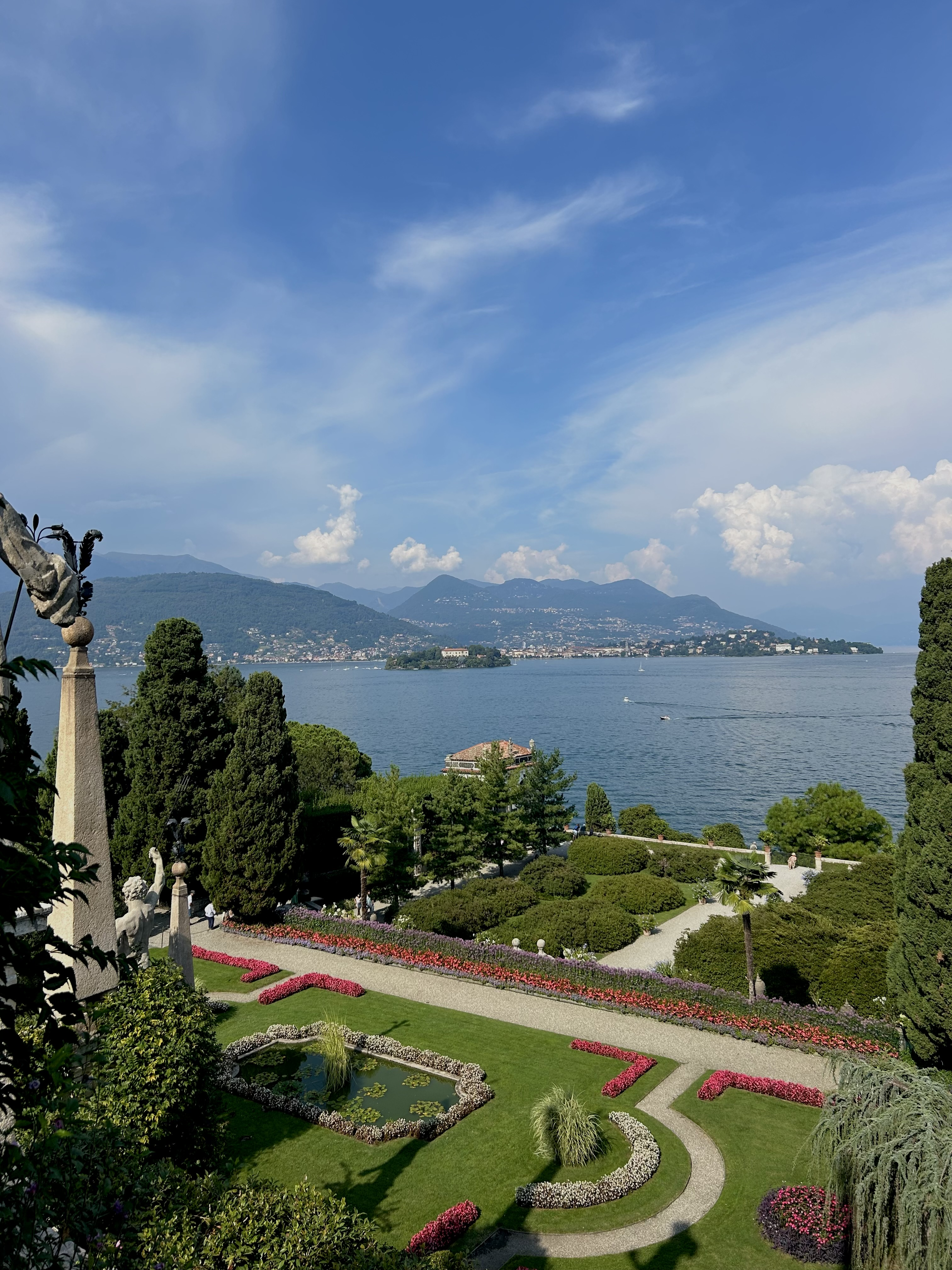
View from the garden

The completion of the gardens, however, was left to his nephew Carlo IV (1657–1734). They were inaugurated in 1671.

The island achieved its highest level of social success during the period of Giberto V Borromeo (1751–1837) when guests included Edward Gibbon, Napoleon and his wife Joséphine de Beauharnais, and Caroline of Brunswick, the Princess of Wales. It is said that Caroline, having fallen in love with the place, did her best to convince the Borromeo family to sell her Isola Madre or the Castelli di Cannero islands; her request being turned down, she established herself on the banks of Lake Como at Cernobbio in the Villa d’Este.

A conference of high representatives of Italy, France, and the United Kingdom was held in the palace at Isola Bella in April 1935, resulting in the agreement known as the Stresa Front.

=== Today ===
Isola Bella is a popular tourist attraction, with a regular ferry service from Stresa, Laveno, Pallanza, and Intra. It plays host to the annual Stresa music festival.
