= Isola Madre =

Island in Piedmont, Italy

Coordinates: 45°54′40″N 8°32′16″E

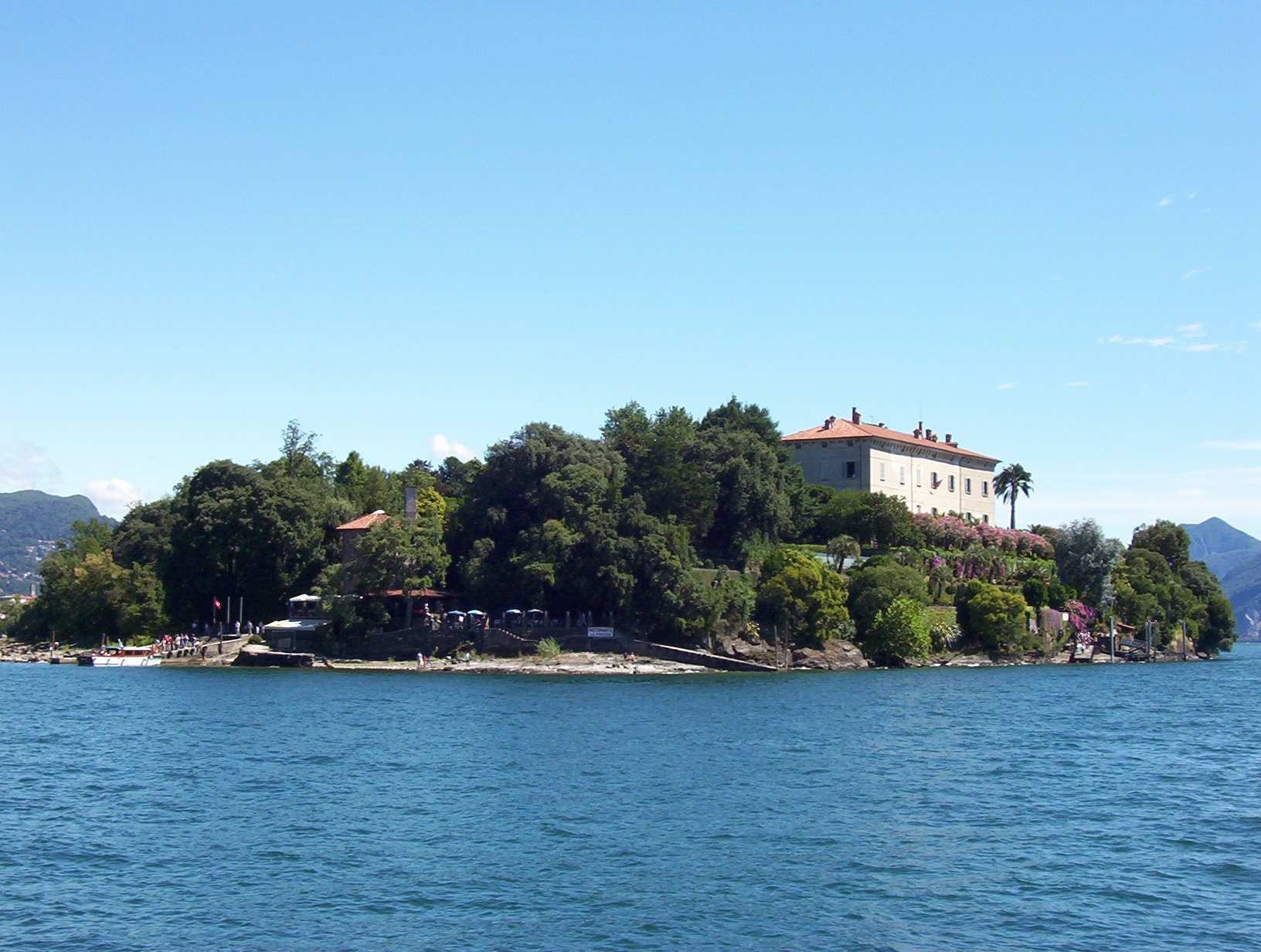

Geography
- Location: Lago Maggiore
- Archipelago: Borromean Islands

Administration
- Italy
- Region: Piedmont
- Province: Verbano-Cusio-Ossola

Isola Madre, at 220 m wide and 330 m long, is the largest island of the Isole Borromee archipelago is in the Italian part of Lake Maggiore in the Alps, in the Province of Verbano Cusio Ossola, Piedmont. The island is occupied by a number of buildings and architectural structures and is known for its gardens. In the past it was known as Isola di San Vittore and later as Isola Maggiore.

== History ==
The available historical sources indicate that in the middle of the ninth century the island had a church, a cemetery (whose existence is recalled by the current garden’s so-called scala dei morti, or “Staircase of the Dead”). It is known for certain that olives were cultivated here; the produce may have been employed for sacred purposes. In 1014, Emperor Henry II granted the island to the nuns of the monastery of San Felice of Pavia.

In 1501 Lancillotto Borromeo, one of the five children of Giovanni III Borromeo and Cleofe Pio di Carpi, introduced the cultivation of citrus fruit to the island, the plants being brought from Liguria, along with a gardener (or hortolano) to tend them. Lancillotto began the construction of the family residence on the island, which in the 1580s was extended in the Renaissance style by Renato I Borromeo.

== Monuments ==
The Palazzo Borromeo was built in the sixteenth century on the remains of the early church, cemetery and perhaps castle of San Vittore (named after the martyr Victor Maurus).

The palace is surrounded by impressive gardens, the Giardini Botanici dell'Isola Madre, covering an area of eight hectares whose construction all’Inglese (in the English style) began in the late eighteenth century on the site of a citrus orchard. Particularly prized is the scala dei morti, or staircase of the dead, which in recent decades has been embellished with an important collection of Wisterias.

The family chapel of 1858 is also noteworthy; by contrast to that of Isola Bella, it contains no tombs or funerary monuments.

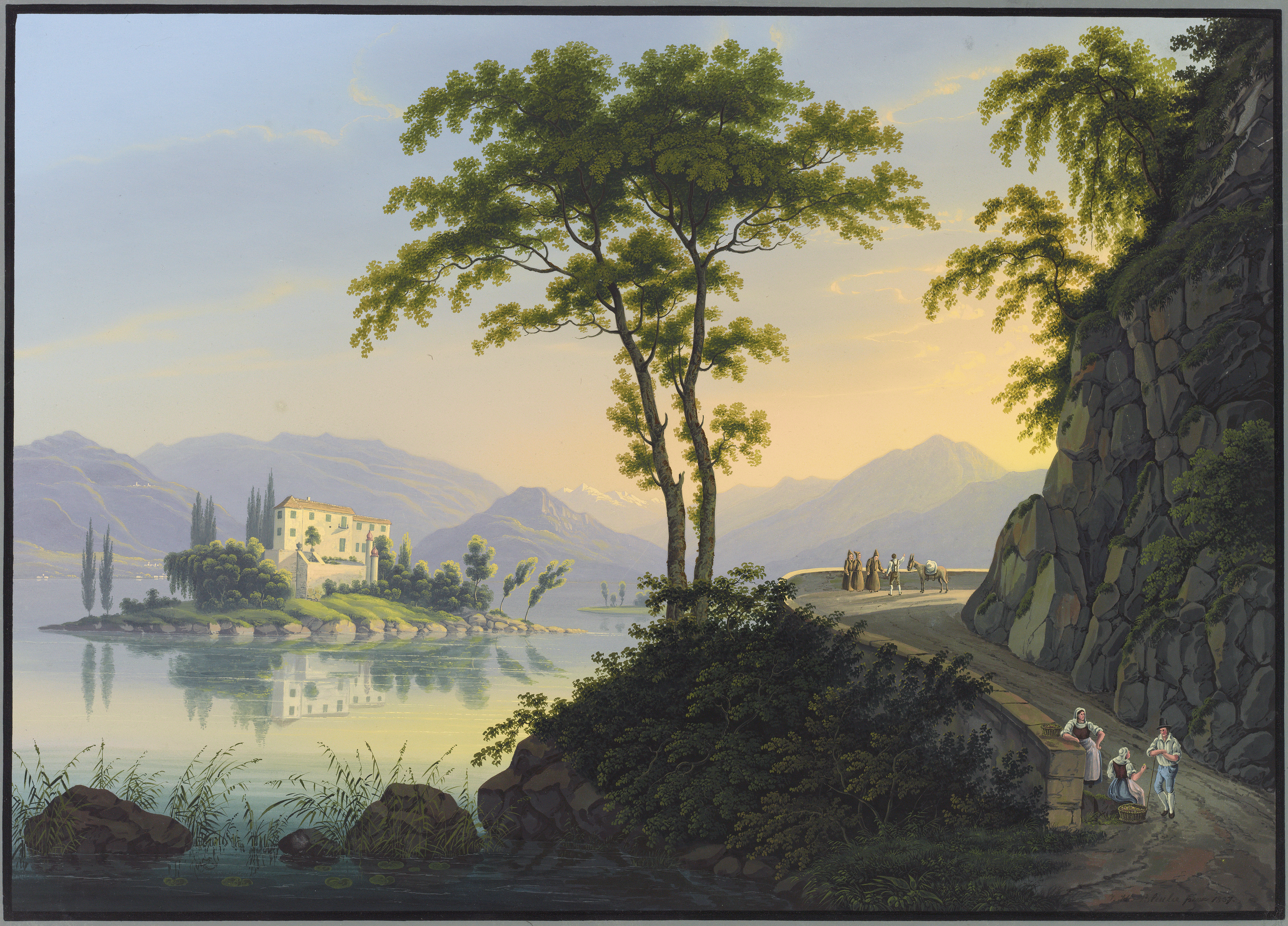
Isola Madre, 1837
