= Germignaga =

- Comune
- Comune di Germignaga
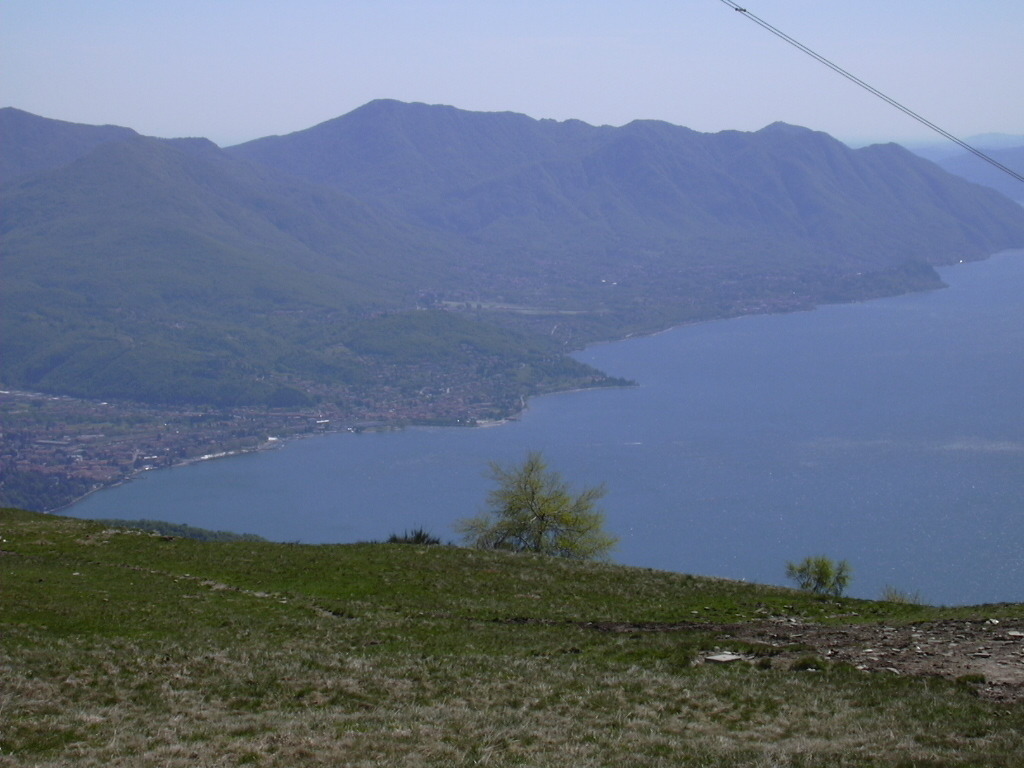

- Location within Italy Location within Lombardy
- Coordinates: 46°0′N 8°44′E
- Country: Italy
- Region: Lombardy
- Province: Province of Varese (VA)
- Frazioni: Ronchetto, Ronchi, Fornace, Casa Moro, Premaggio and Mirandola Nuova

Area
  - Total: 6.2 km^{2} (2.4 sq mi)
- Elevation: 204 m (669 ft)

Population (Dec. 2004)
  - Total: 3,721
  - Density: 600/km^{2} (1,600/sq mi)
- Demonym: Germignaghesi
- Time zone: UTC+1 (CET)
  - Summer (DST): UTC+2 (CEST)
- Postal code: 21010
- Dialing code: 0332
- Website: Official website

Germignaga is a comune (municipality) in the Province of Varese in the Italian region Lombardy, located about 70 km (43 mi) northwest of Milan and about 20 km (12 mi) northwest of Varese. As of 31 December 2004, it had a population of 3,721 and an area of 6.2 km^{2} (2.4 sq mi).

The municipality of Germignaga contains the frazioni (subdivisions, mainly villages and hamlets) Ronchetto, Ronchi, Fornace, Casa Moro, Premaggio and Mirandola Nuova.

Germignaga borders the following municipalities: Brezzo di Bedero, Brissago-Valtravaglia, Cannero Riviera, Luino, Montegrino Valtravaglia.

== Demographic evolution ==
Historical population

Year	Pop.	±%
1861	1,005	—
1871	1,134	+12.8%
1881	1,302	+14.8%
1901	2,587	+98.7%
1911	2,643	+2.2%

Year	Pop.	±%
1921	2,395	−9.4%
1931	2,479	+3.5%
1936	2,398	−3.3%
1951	2,755	+14.9%
1961	3,031	+10.0%

Year	Pop.	±%
1971	3,560	+17.5%
1981	3,232	−9.2%
1991	3,356	+3.8%
2001	3,596	+7.2%

Source: Data from ISTAT

== Noted Germignaga people ==
- Pier Giacomo Pisoni, historian
