= Isola dei Pescatori =

Island settlement in northern Italy

Coordinates: 45°54′02″N 8°31′14″E

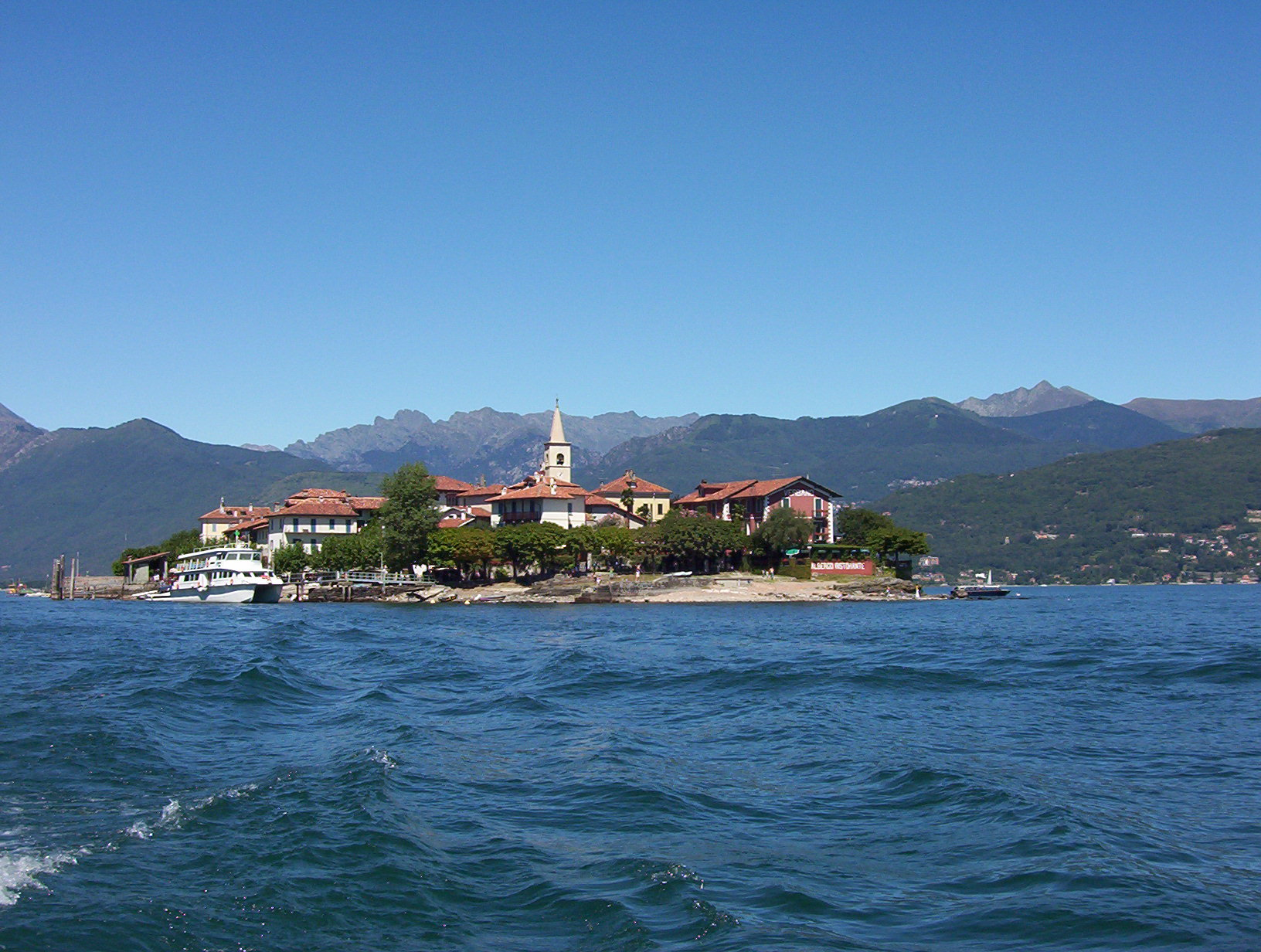

Geography
- Location: Lago Maggiore
- Archipelago: Borromean Islands

Administration
- Italy
- Region: Piedmont
- Province: Verbano-Cusio-Ossola

Demographics
- Population: 57 (2016)

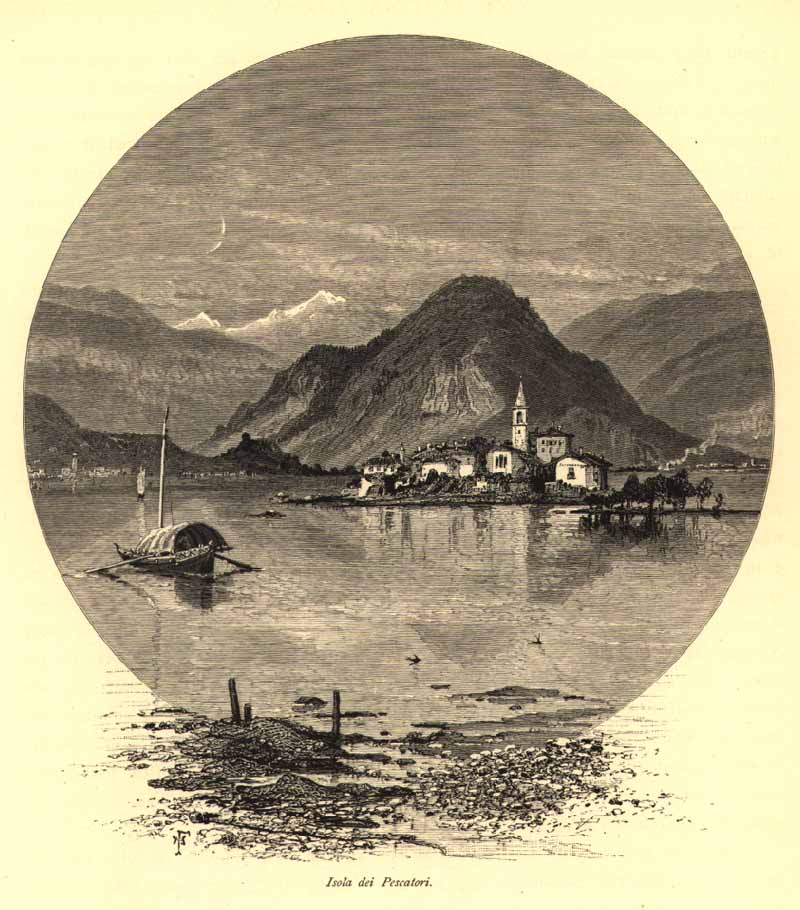
The island in an image of 1878 by Josiah Wood Whymper

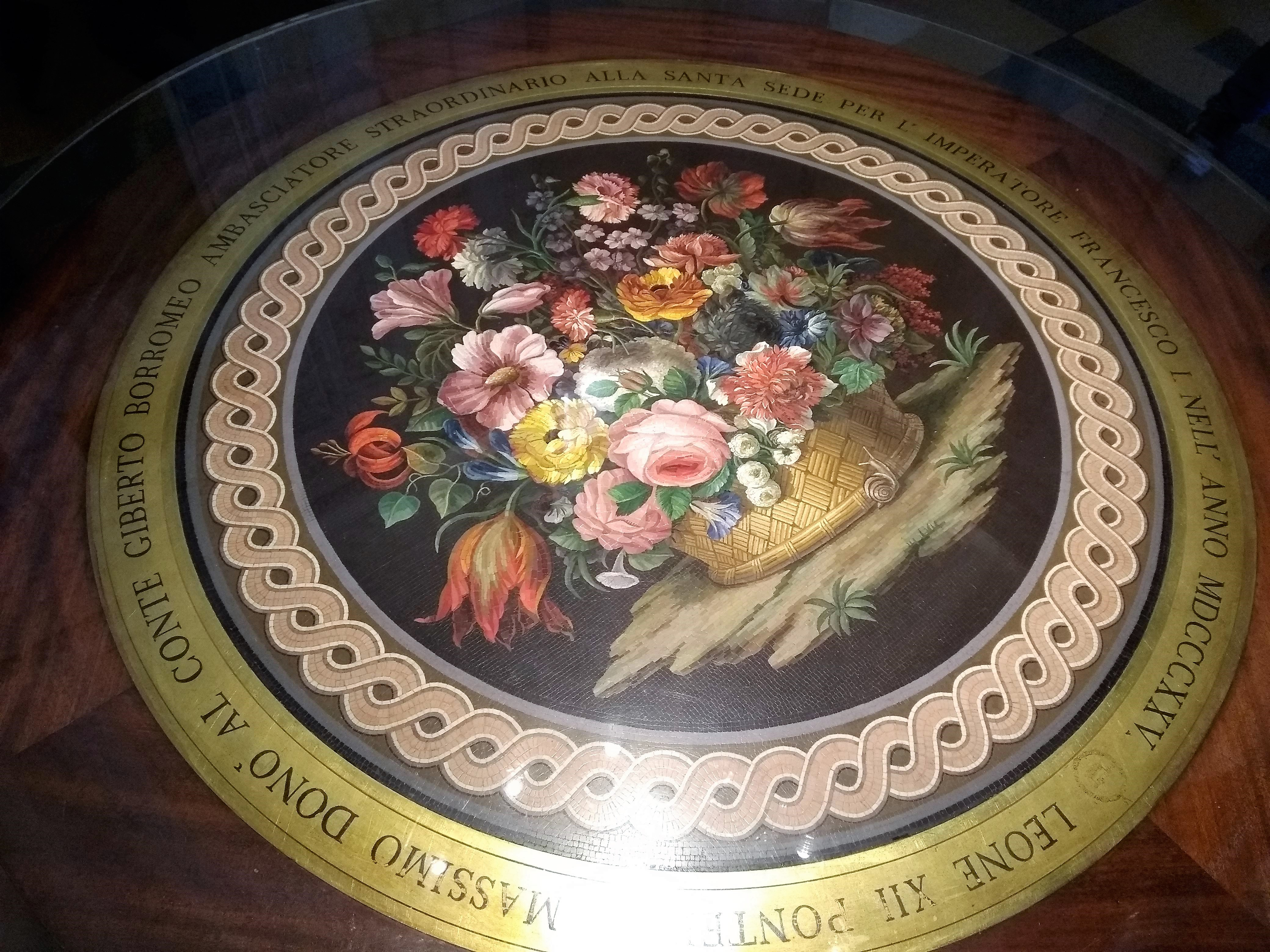
A table in Palazzo Borromeo on Isola Bella, Piedmont, Italy commemorates the visit of the King of Naples in 1825.

Isola dei Pescatori (meaning Fishermen's Island) is an island in Lake Maggiore in northern Italy. As the most northerly of the three principal Borromean Islands it is also known as Isola Superiore and, with a population of 25 in 2018, it is the only one to be inhabited all year round. Unlike Isola Bella and Isola Madre, the island has never belonged to the Borromeo family.

== Description ==
The island is about 375 metres long by 100 metres wide. A narrow street running along its spine is joined by cobbled alleys to the promenade that encircles the island. The promenade is frequently flooded and the houses built against it are constructed to allow for this.

In 1971 the population of the island was 208, but has steadily declined to 25 in 2018. The church of San Vittore retains traces of a chapel that was probably constructed for the monks of Scozzòla (an abbey of San Donato di Sesto Calende founded by Liutardo, the bishop of Pavia, in the mid ninth century). The church was previously dedicated to S. Gangolfo (Gangulphus), whose veneration is linked with the Abbey of San Donato.
