= Castelli di Cannero =

Islets in Maggiore Lake in Italy

Coordinates: 46.0239°N 8.70528°E

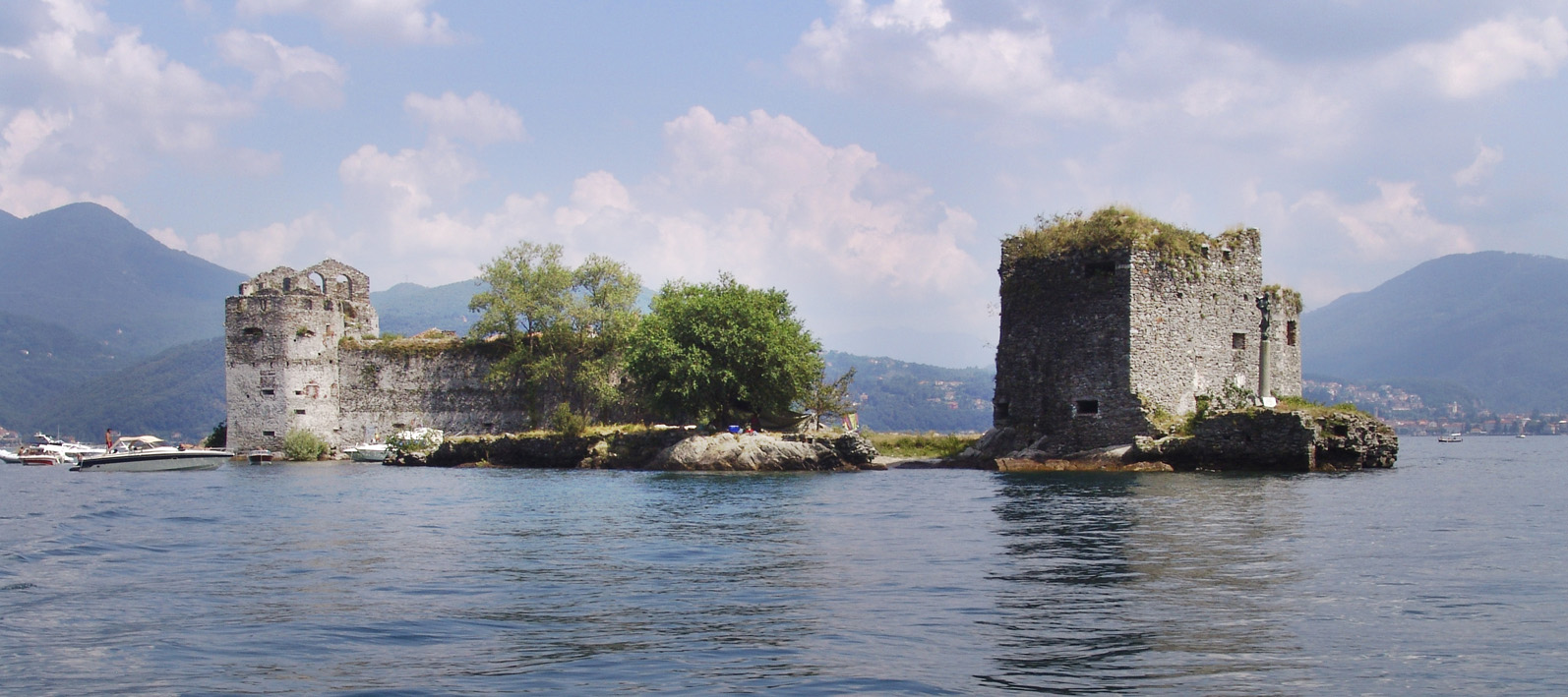
Castelli di Cannero

The Castelli di Cannero are three rocky islets of Lake Maggiore in northern Italy. They are located off the shoreline of Cannero Riviera while administratively forming part of the Comune of Cannobio. They are known as castelli, or castles, in recognition of the ruined ancient fortifications which are found on two of them. They are all that remains of the Rocca Vitaliana fortress built between 1519 and 1521 by Ludovico Borromeo, who gave it this name in honour of an illustrious ancestor.

The fortress was built over the ruins of an earlier castle, the Castello della Malpaga, which had been used since the 15th century as a refuge by the powerful, cruel Mazzarditi family. The five Mazzarditi brothers took control of the burgh of Cannobio between 1403 and 1404, terrorizing the inhabitants of the district with their acts of violence and piracy.

This went on until the Viscontis laid siege to the fortress, starving the bandits into surrender. The old castle was razed to the ground, so that no trace of it remains. The Rocca Vitaliana was then built to defend the upper part of Lake Maggiore from incursions by the Swiss after the Duchy of Milan lost control of the Canton of Ticino. The main part of the castle, on the eastern islet, still has its massive walls built right on the water, following the irregular contours of the rock, and some towers of different shapes which still have part of their battlements.

All that remains of the castle on the western islet is a ruined tower and some crumbling parts of the wall. The ruins cannot be visited as they are unsafe, but the view of them from the shore or from a boat continues to be compelling.

The islands’ rocky shores are a magnet for adventurous bathers.
