= Cannero Riviera =

- Comune
- Comune di Cannero Riviera
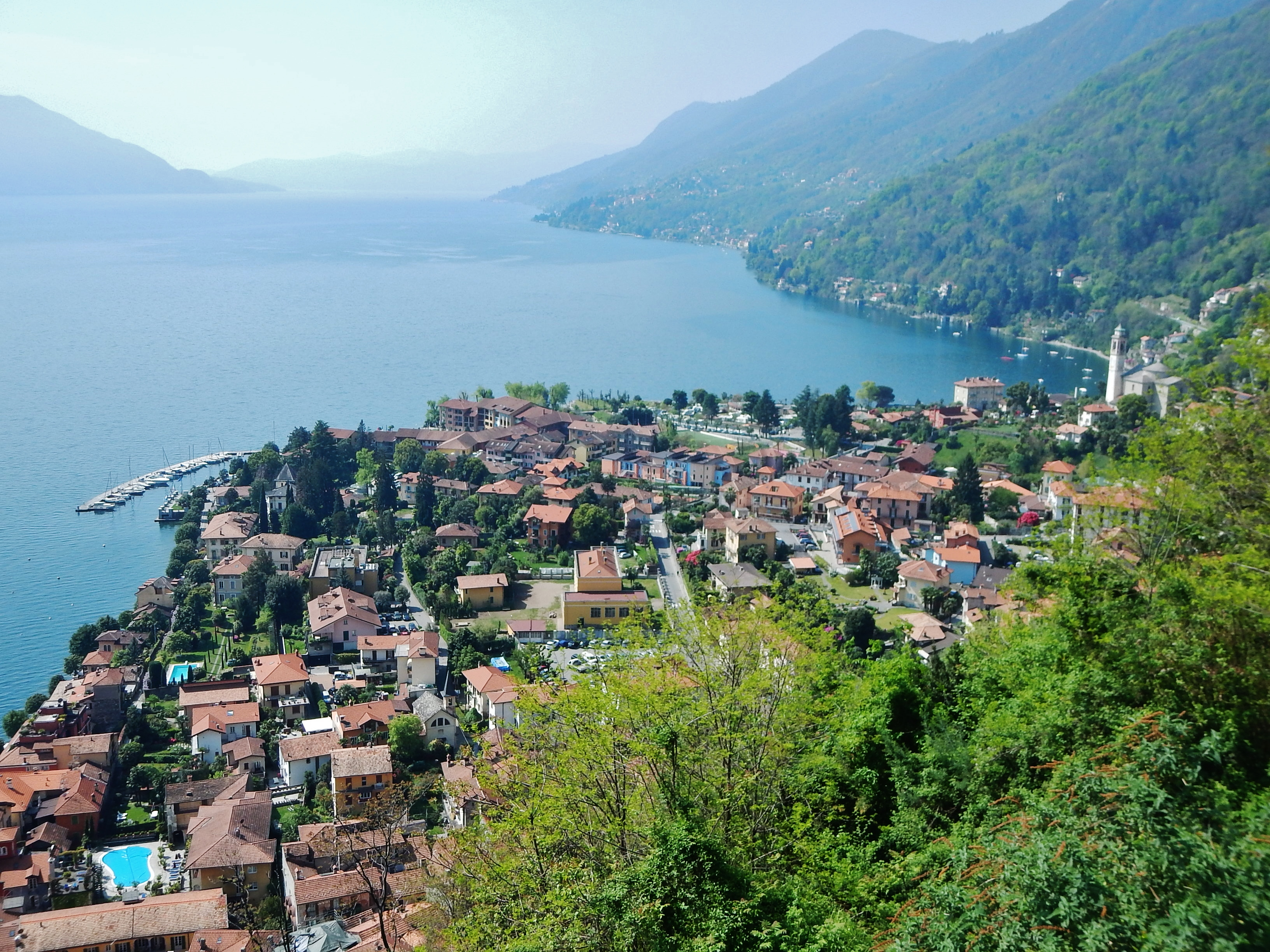

- Location within Italy Location within Piedmont
- Coordinates: 46°1′N 8°41′E
- Country: Italy
- Region: Piedmont
- Province: Verbano-Cusio-Ossola (VCO)

Government
  - Mayor: Federico Carmine (elected 26/05/2014) (The Residents' Group)

Area
  - Total: 14.46 km^{2} (5.58 sq mi)
- Elevation: 212 m (696 ft)

Population (31 May 2011)
  - Total: 973
  - Density: 67.3/km^{2} (174/sq mi)
- Demonym: Canneresi
- Time zone: UTC+1 (CET)
  - Summer (DST): UTC+2 (CEST)
- Postal code: 28821
- Dialing code: 0323
- Patron saint: Madonna del Carmine
- Saint day: Second Monday of July
- Website: Official website
- outlying wards: Barbè, Donego, Cassino, Cheggio, Oggiogno, Piancassone, Ponte

Cannero Riviera ([càn-ne-ro]; in Western Lombard Càner), is a comune (an Italian municipality) with a population of 973 and an area of 14.46 square kilometres (5.58 mi^{2}) in the Province of Verbano-Cusio-Ossola in the Italian region of Piedmont. The settlement is situated on the western shore of Lago Maggiore; it is about 130 kilometres (81 mi) northeast of Turin about 15 kilometres (9 mi) northeast of Verbania and a similar distance from the Italian-speaking, Swiss Canton known as the Ticino.

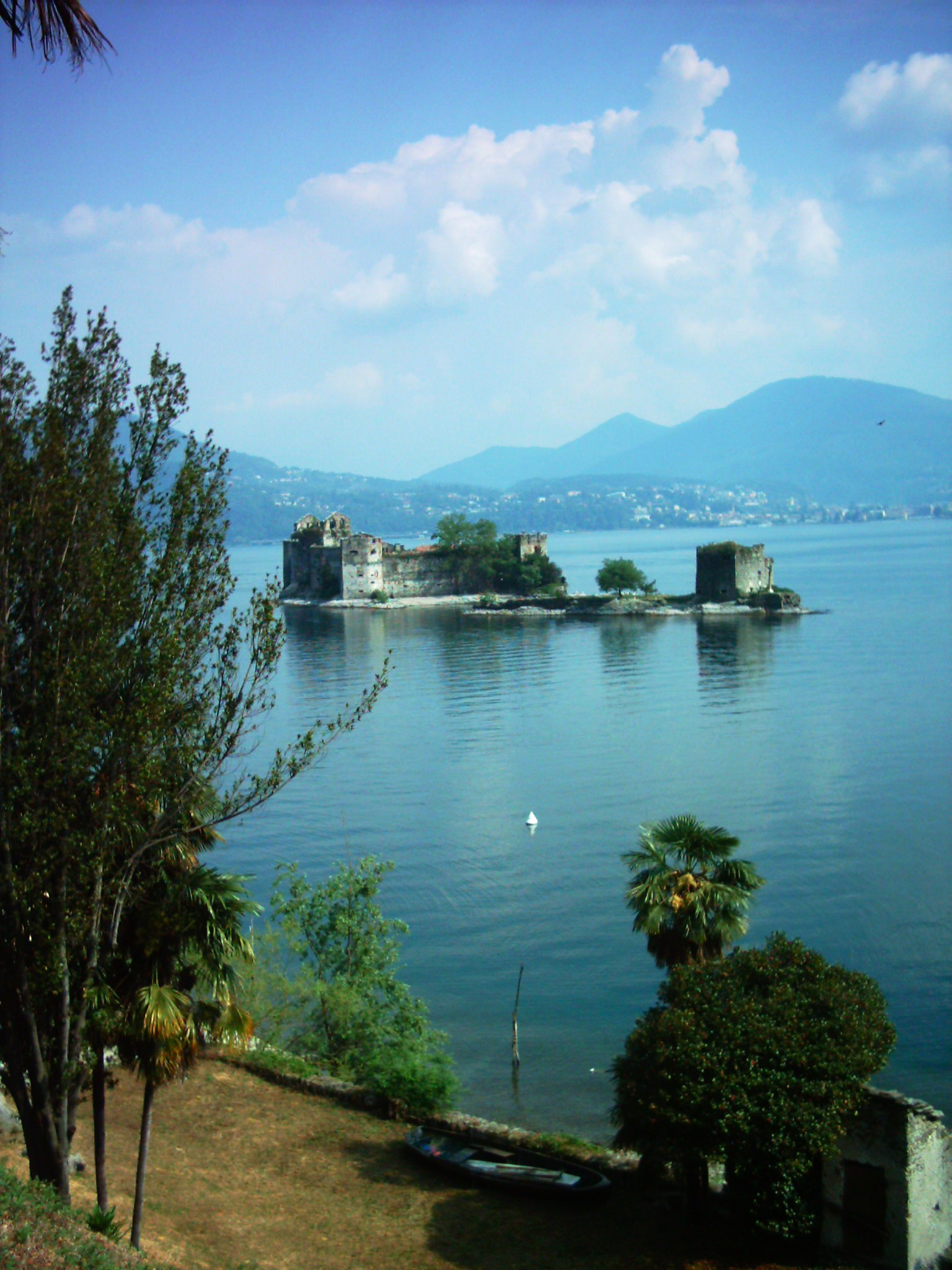
the remains of the Castle

Cannero Riviera borders the following municipalities: Aurano, Cannobio, Oggebbio, Trarego Viggiona; and across the lake in the Lombard Province of Varese: Brezzo di Bedero, Germignaga, Luino.

The 19th-century politician Massimo D’Azeglio spent his last years in his villa here.

== Demographic evolution ==
Historical population

| Year | Pop. | ±% |
|---|---|---|
| 1861 | 1,111 | — |
| 1871 | 1,079 | −2.9% |
| 1881 | 988 | −8.4% |
| 1901 | 1,155 | +16.9% |
| 1911 | 1,268 | +9.8% |

| Year | Pop. | ±% |
|---|---|---|
| 1921 | 1,254 | −1.1% |
| 1931 | 1,218 | −2.9% |
| 1936 | 1,243 | +2.1% |
| 1951 | 1,251 | +0.6% |
| 1961 | 1,388 | +11.0% |

| Year | Pop. | ±% |
|---|---|---|
| 1971 | 1,406 | +1.3% |
| 1981 | 1,290 | −8.3% |
| 1991 | 1,220 | −5.4% |
| 2001 | 1,050 | −13.9% |
| 2011 | 973 | −7.3% |

Source: Data from ISTAT

=== Minorities of foreign residents ===
ISTAT data recorded on January 1, 2011, show that there were 107 foreign residents, as follows:

- Greek 42
- German 27
- Bangladeshi 16
- Brazilian 10
- Others 12

== See also ==
- Castelli di Cannero
