= Stresa =

- Comune
- Comune di Stresa
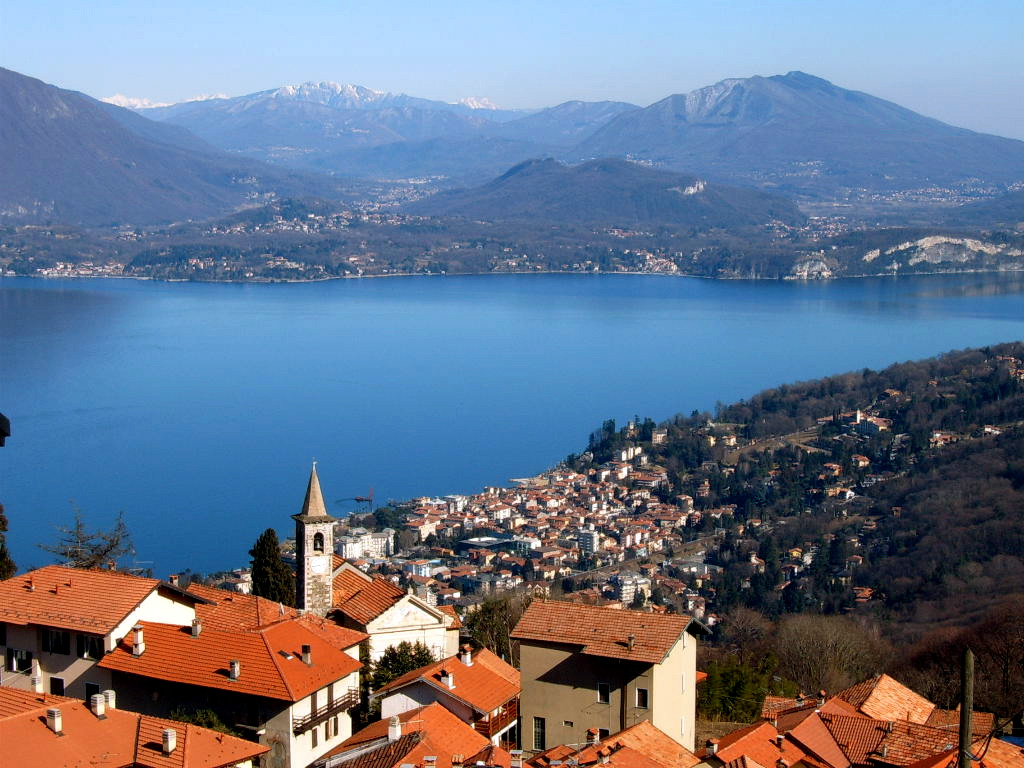
- Stresa and Lake Maggiore

- Coat of arms

- Location within Italy Location within Piedmont
- Coordinates: 45°53′01″N 08°32′22″E
- Country: Italy
- Region: Piedmont
- Province: Verbano-Cusio-Ossola (VB)
- Frazioni: Brisino, Campino, Carciano, Levo, Binda, Passera, San Giovanni, Someraro, Vedasco, Magognino, Stropino, Alpino, Motta del Santo, Mottarone, Isola Bella, Isola Pescatori, La Sacca

Government
  - Mayor: Marcella Severino

Area
  - Total: 35.36 km^{2} (13.65 sq mi)
- Elevation: 200 m (660 ft)

Population (1 January 2021)
  - Total: 4,600
  - Density: 130/km^{2} (340/sq mi)
- Demonym: Stresiani
- Time zone: UTC+1 (CET)
  - Summer (DST): UTC+2 (CEST)
- Postal code: 28838
- Dialing code: 0323
- Patron saint: Ambrose
- Saint day: 7 December
- Website: Official website

Stresa (Italian pronunciation: [ˈstrɛːza]) is a comune of about 4,600 residents on the shores of Lake Maggiore in the province of Verbano-Cusio-Ossola, in the Italian region of Piedmont. about 90 kilometres (56 mi) northwest of Milan. It is situated on road and rail routes to the Simplon Pass.

== History ==
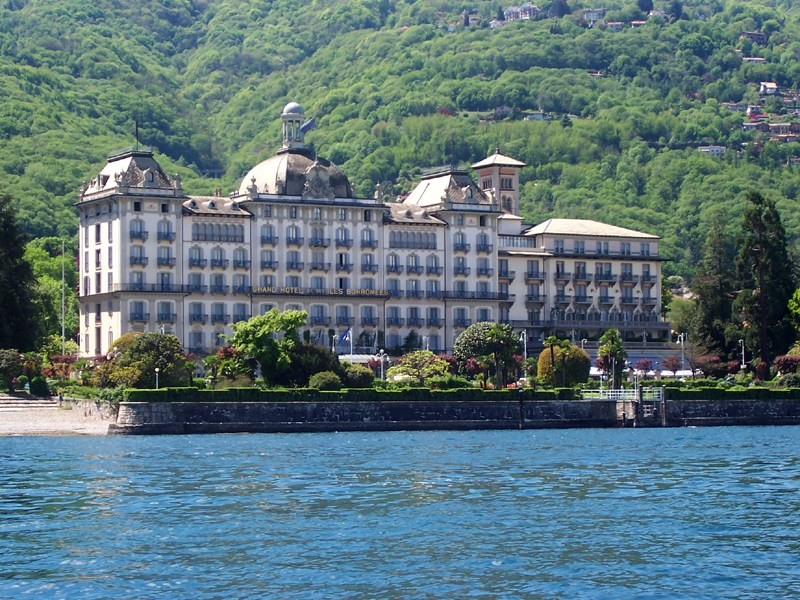
The Grand Hotel in Stresa

The name of the town first appeared in documents on 15 January AD 998 as "Strixsya"; later "Strexia", "Strexa" and "Stresia" were used. In 1014 Stresa was donated by Emperor Henry II to the female Benedictine monastery of San Felice of Pavia. In the 15th century it grew into a fishing community and owed feudal allegiance to the House of Visconti of Milan. It subsequently came under the control of the Borromeo family.

In 1948 American author and journalist Ernest Hemingway visited the town; he had set part of his 1929 novel Farewell to Arms in the Grand Hotel des Îles Borromées.

Stresa hosted a number of political conferences in the 20th century, including in:

- 1935 when the UK, Italy and France re-affirmed the Treaty of Locarno and agreed to form the Stresa front to combat and contain Nazi Germany and
- 1958 when the foundations of what would become Europe's Common Agricultural Policy of the European Economic Community were formulated

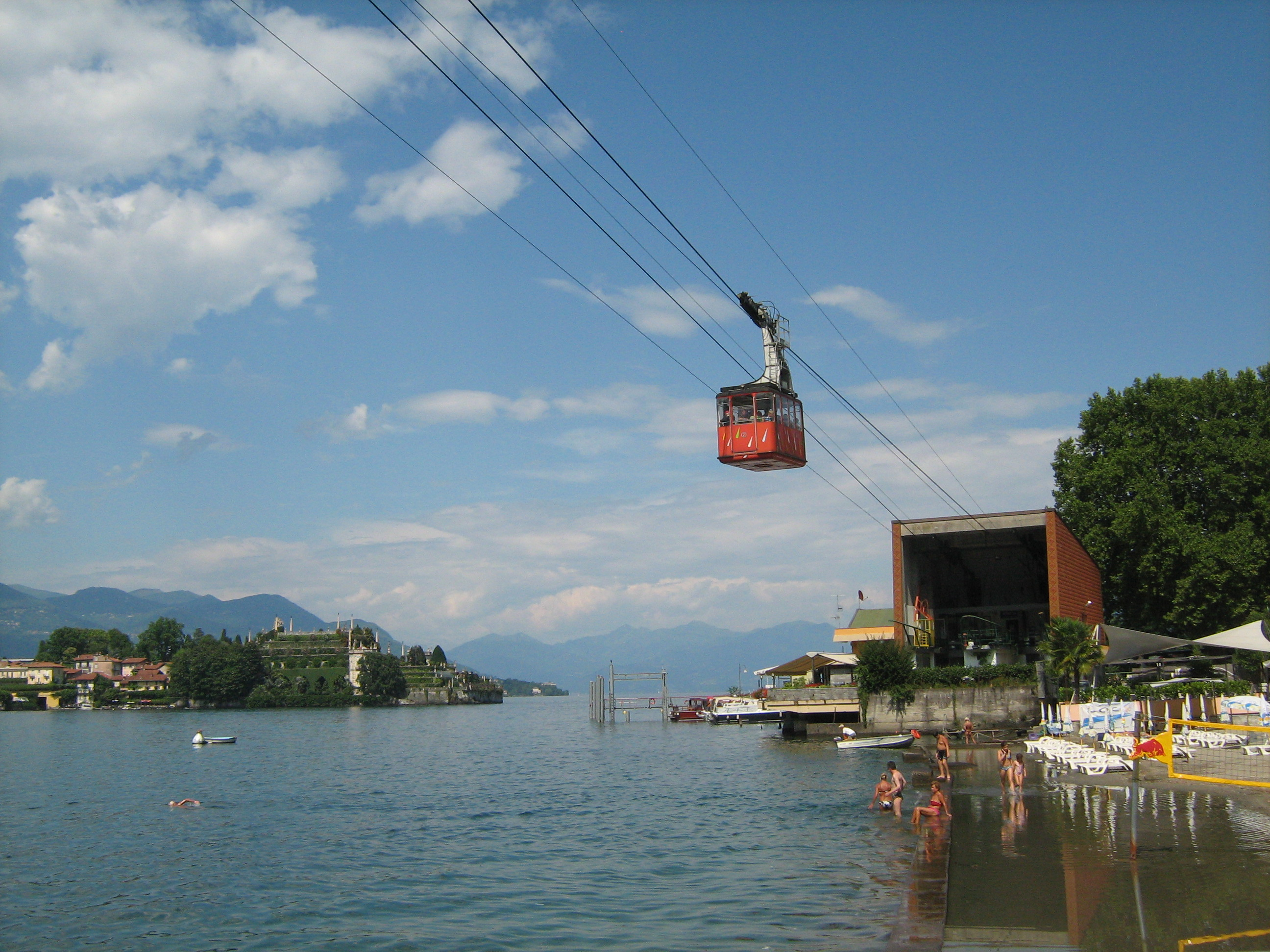
The cable car to Monte Mottarone

== Transport ==
EuroCity train services connect south to Milan and north to Bern and Basel. Ferry-boat service from the town's two docks provides regular access to the nearby Borromean Islands. The nearest airport is Milan Malpensa (approx. 43 km).

Until its May 2021 deadly disaster the Stresa-Alpino-Mottarone Cable Car offered a 20-minute ride to the summit of Monte Mottarone, with the Giardino Botanico Alpinia en route. As of late 2023 this is to be rebuilt in 2024 and reenter service in summer 2025.

== Main sights ==
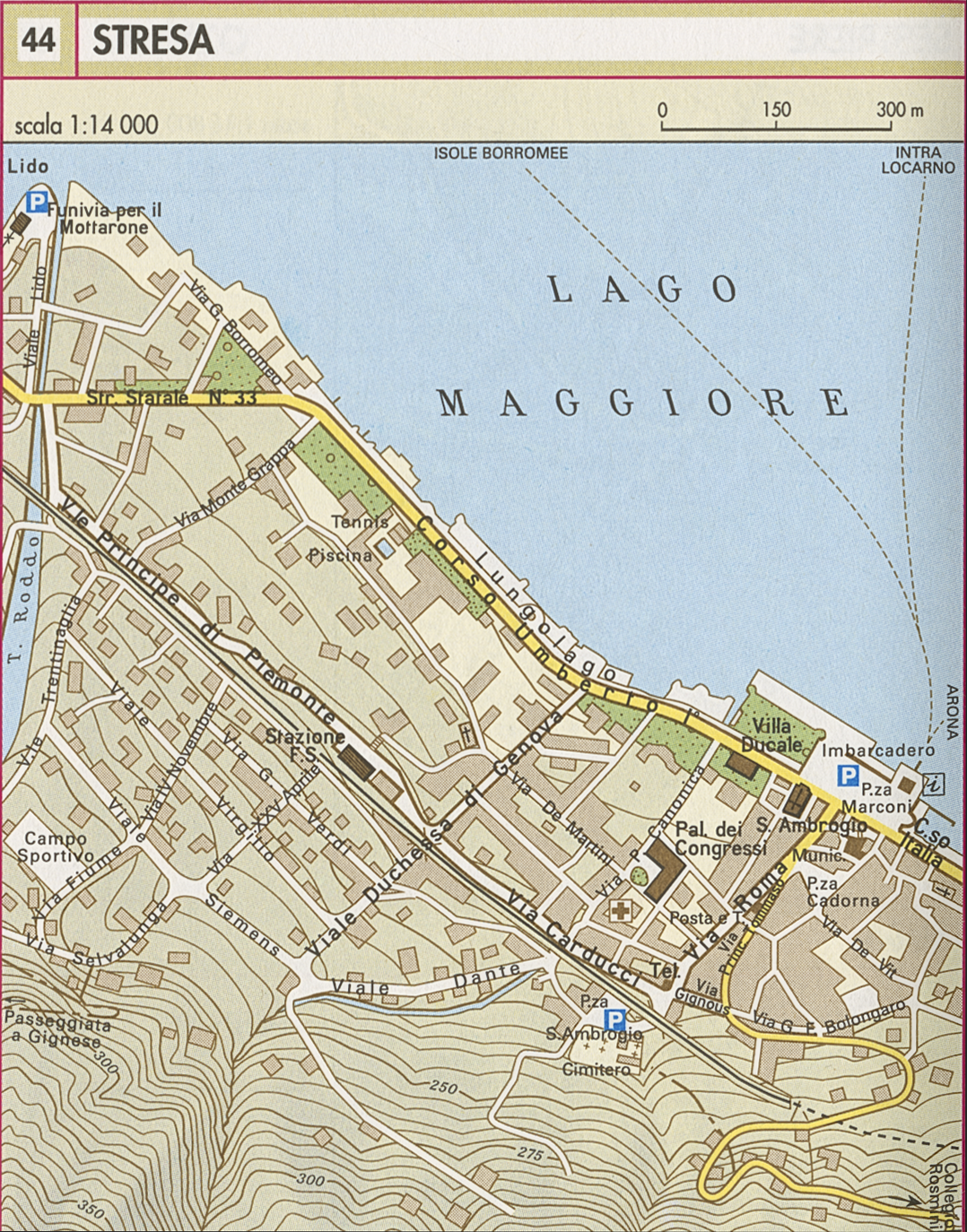
Map of city center

- Borromean Islands near Stresa are major points of interest and can be seen from Stresa.
- Villa Ducale, commissioned by Giacomo Filippo Bolongaro and dating from about 1770. In 1848 the villa passed to the Italian philosopher Antonio Rosmini-Serbati and today it houses the International Centre for Rosminian Studies.
- Villa Dell'Orto, built in 1900. It was commissioned by the painter Liberto Dell'Orto and designed by Boffi.
- The large Villa Pallavicino, between Stresa and Belgirate. It was the inspiration of Ruggero Bonghi in the 1850s and now is the site of a zoological park.
- Church of Saints Ambrogio and Theodul (restored in Neoclassical style by Giuseppe Zanoia in 1790)
- Villa "La Palazzola"
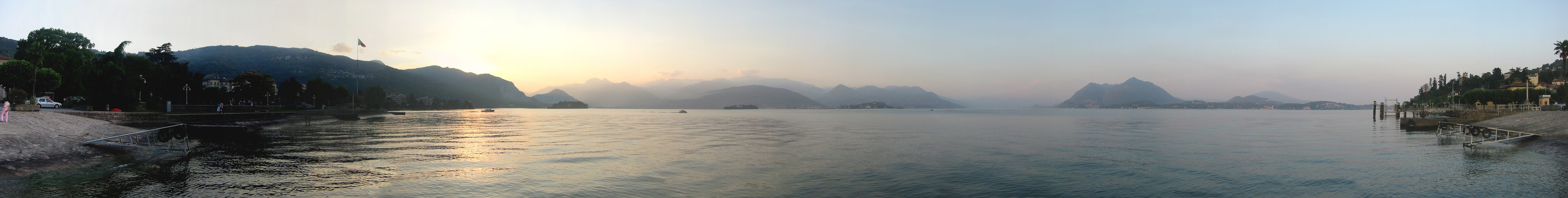
A panorama of Lake Maggiore from Stresa pier

== Famous buildings of Stresa in movies ==
- Villa Castelli, location of the black comedy Beati i ricchi (Blessed Are the Rich) (1972) by Salvatore Samperi, the TV movie horror Ho incontrato un'ombra (1974) by Daniele D'Anza, the thriller The Bishop's Bedroom (1977) by Dino Risi and the drama La Sapienza (2014) by Eugène Green.
- Regina Palace Hotel, location of Totò al giro d'Italia (1948) by Mario Mattoli, Miss Italia (1950) by Duilio Coletti, Grand Hotel Excelsior (1982) by Castellano & Pipolo.

== Stresa in fiction ==
- Good Blood by Aaron Elkins (2004), Berkley Prime Crime, ISBN 0-425-19411-6
- A Farewell To Arms by Ernest Hemingway
