= Borromean Islands =

Island group in Italy

Coordinates: 45°54′28″N 8°32′19″E

Native name: Isole Borromee
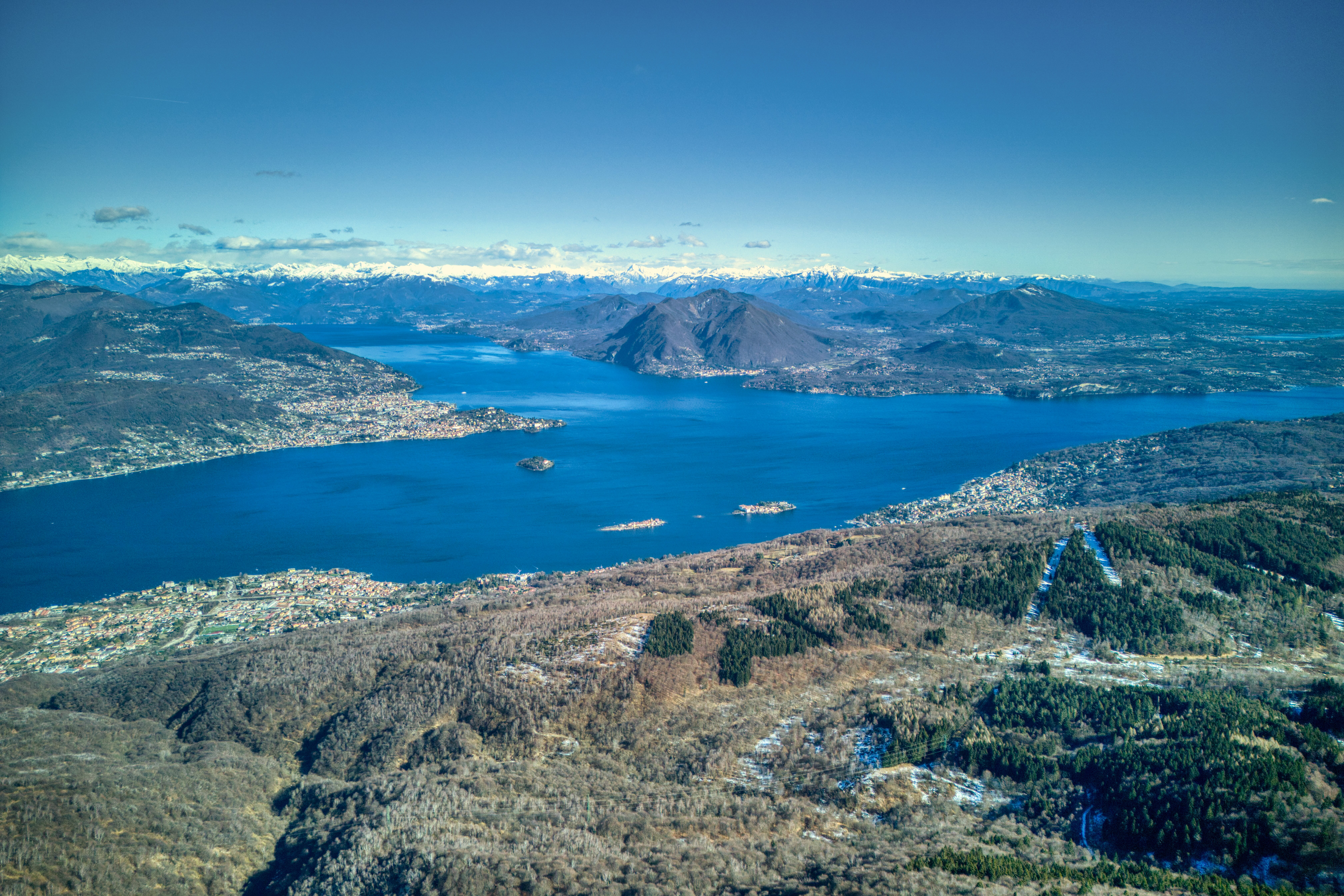
- Lago Maggiore with Borromean Islands

Geography
- Location: Lago Maggiore
- Archipelago: Borromean Islands
- Total islands: 4
- Major islands: Isola Bella, Isola Madre, Isola dei Pescatori, Isolino di San Giovanni
- Area: 0.20 km^{2} (0.077 sq mi)

Administration
- Italy
- Region: Piedmont
- Province: Verbano-Cusio-Ossola

Demographics
- Population: 208 (1971)

The Borromean Islands (It. Isole Borromee) are a group of three small islands and two islets in the Italian part of Lago Maggiore, located in the western arm of the lake, between Verbania to the north and Stresa to the south. Together totalling just 50 acres (20 hectares) in area, they are a major local tourist attraction for their picturesque setting.

Their name derives from the Borromeo family, which started acquiring them in the early 16th century (Isola Madre) and still owns the majority of them (Isola Madre, Bella, San Giovanni) today.

1. Isola Bella, named for Isabella, countess Borromeo, was originally a largely barren rock; after first improvements and buildings, opened by count Carlo III between 1629 and 1652, his son Vitaliano the 6th built an attractive summer palace, bringing in vast quantities of soil in order to build up a system of ten terraces for the garden. The unfinished building displays paintings by Lombard artists and Flemish tapestries.
2. Isola Madre, the largest of the three, is also noted for its gardens, which have been maintained since about 1823 in an English style. Its palace, though uninhabited, is splendidly furnished with 16th- to 19th-century Italian masterpieces and paintings.
3. Isola dei Pescatori or Isola Superiore is now the only inhabited island in the archipelago. It has a fishing village, which in 1971 had a population of 208.
4. Isolino di San Giovanni is located just off Pallanza (today part of Verbania) to the north.
5. The tiny uninhabited rock of Malghera, with an area of only 200 square metres, lies between Isola Bella and Isola dei Pescatori and offers bushy vegetation and a small beach.
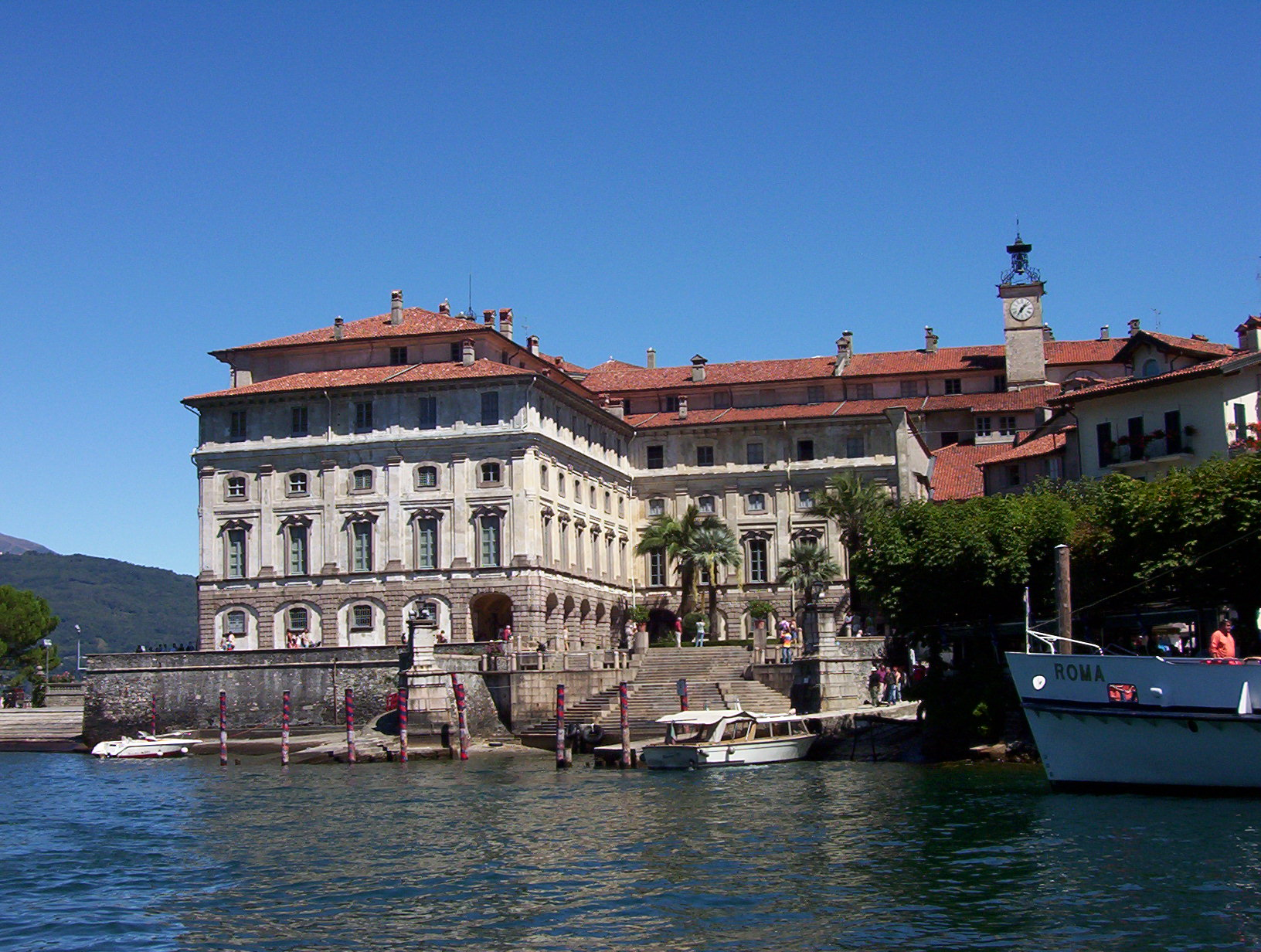
Isola Bella

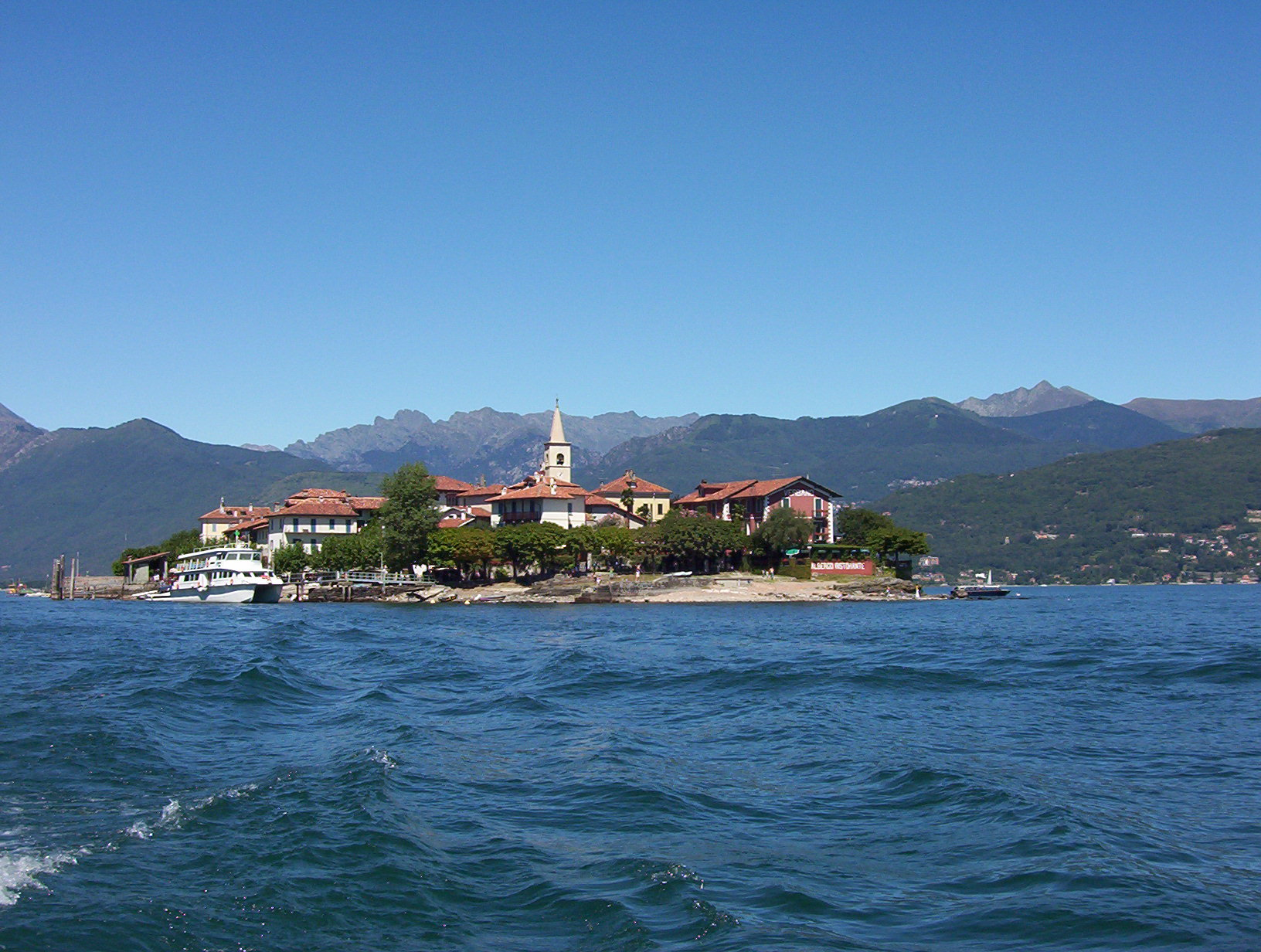
Isola dei Pescatori

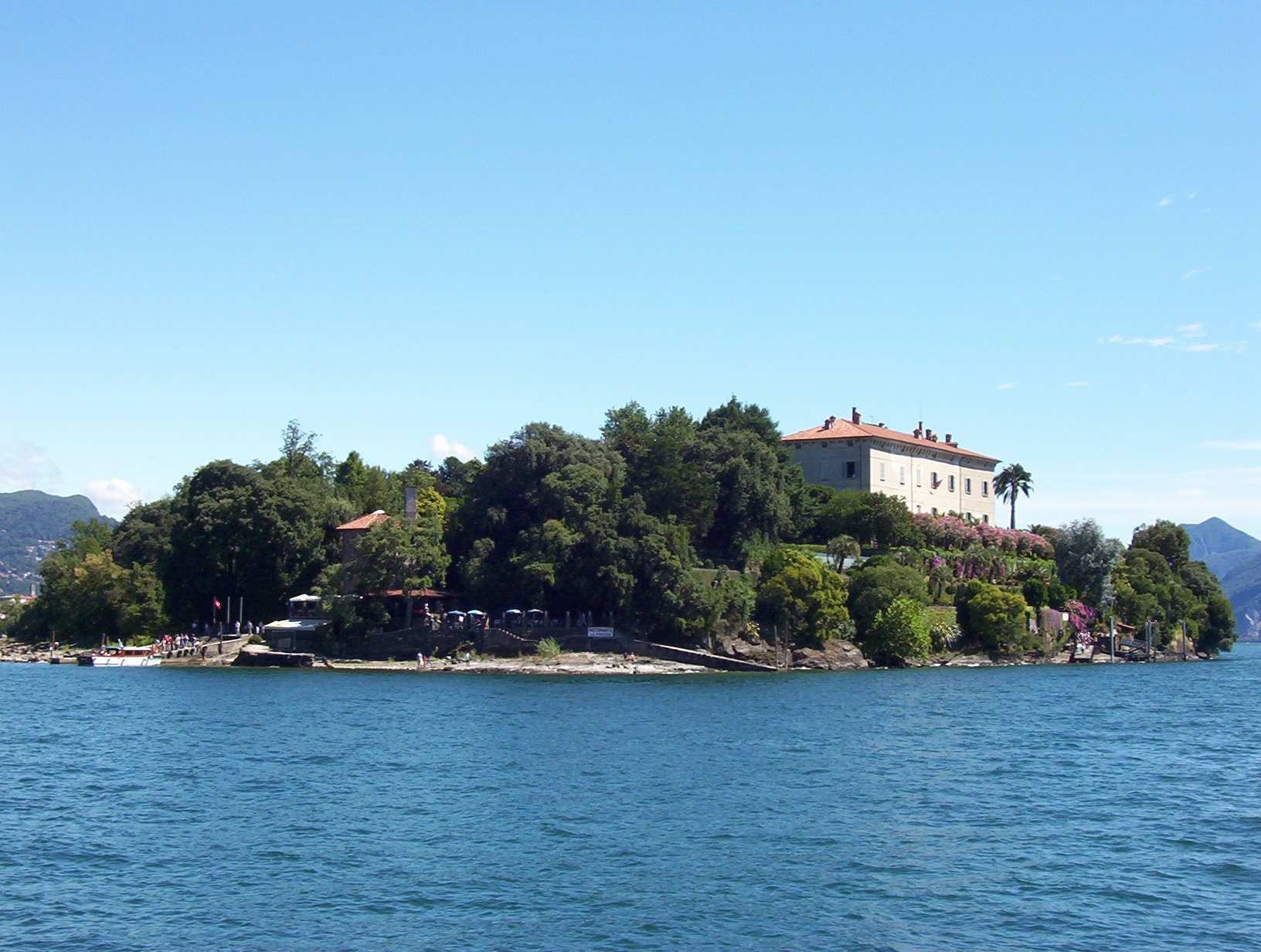
Isola Madre

Map

== See also ==
- Borromean rings
- Carlo Borromeo
- Federico Borromeo
- Isole di Brissago
