= Lake Maggiore =

Lake in Italy and Switzerland

- Lago Maggiore (Italian); Verbano (Italian); Lagh Maggior (Lombard); Lagh Magior (Piedmontese)
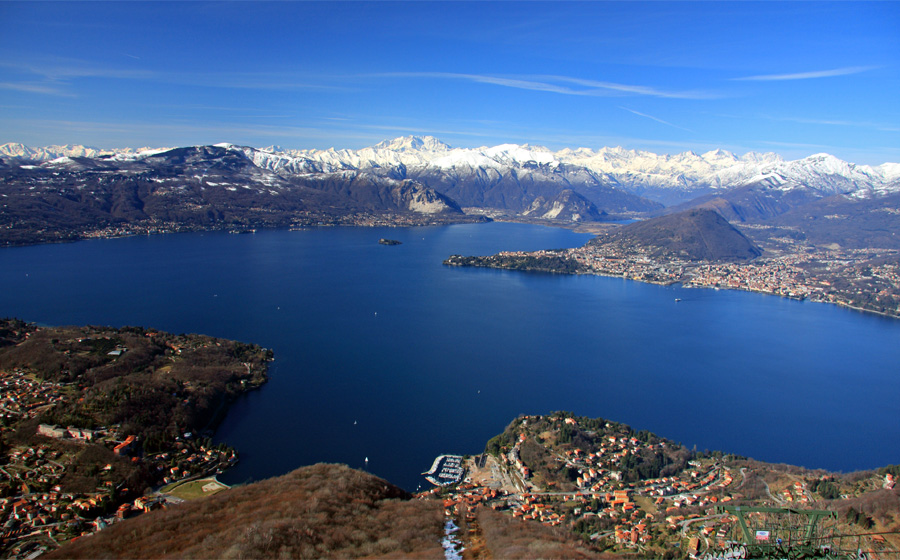
- View of Lake Maggiore towards the Alps and Monte Rosa from above Laveno

- Location within Alps Location within Switzerland Location within Canton of Ticino
- Interactive map of Lake Maggiore
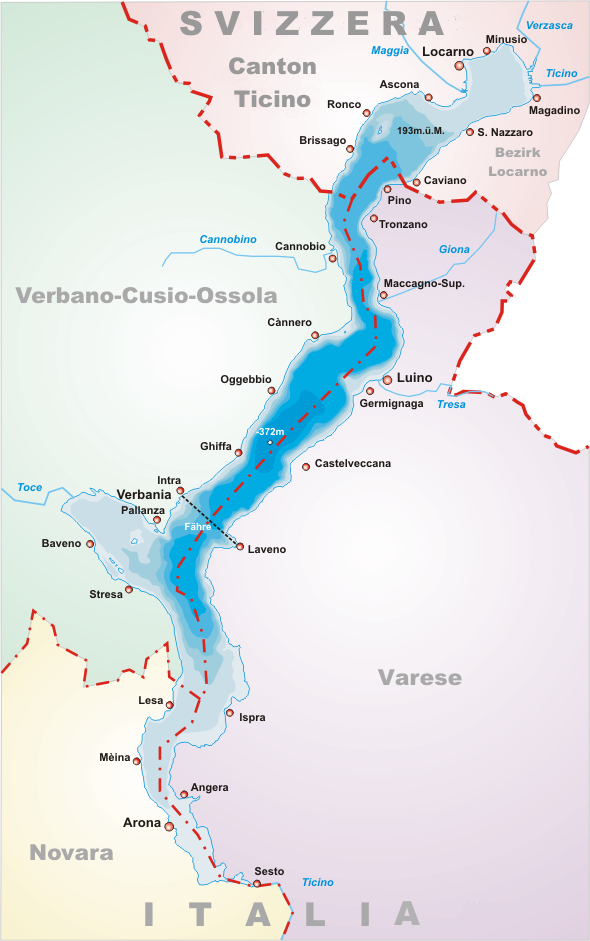
- Location: Lombardy and Piedmont, Italy; Ticino, Switzerland
- Coordinates: 46°05′53″N 08°42′53″E
- Primary inflows: Ticino, Maggia, Toce, Tresa
- Primary outflows: Ticino
- Catchment area: 6,599 km^{2} (2,548 sq mi)
- Basin countries: Italy, Switzerland
- Max. length: 64.37 km (40.00 mi)
- Max. width: 10 km (6.2 mi)
- Surface area: 212.5 km^{2} (82.0 sq mi)
- Average depth: 177.4 m (582 ft)
- Max. depth: 372 m (1,220 ft)
- Water volume: 37.7 km^{3} (9.0 cu mi)
- Residence time: 4 years
- Surface elevation: 193 m (633 ft)
- Islands: Brissago Islands, Borromean Islands
- Settlements: Arona, Locarno, Luino, Stresa, Verbania (see list)

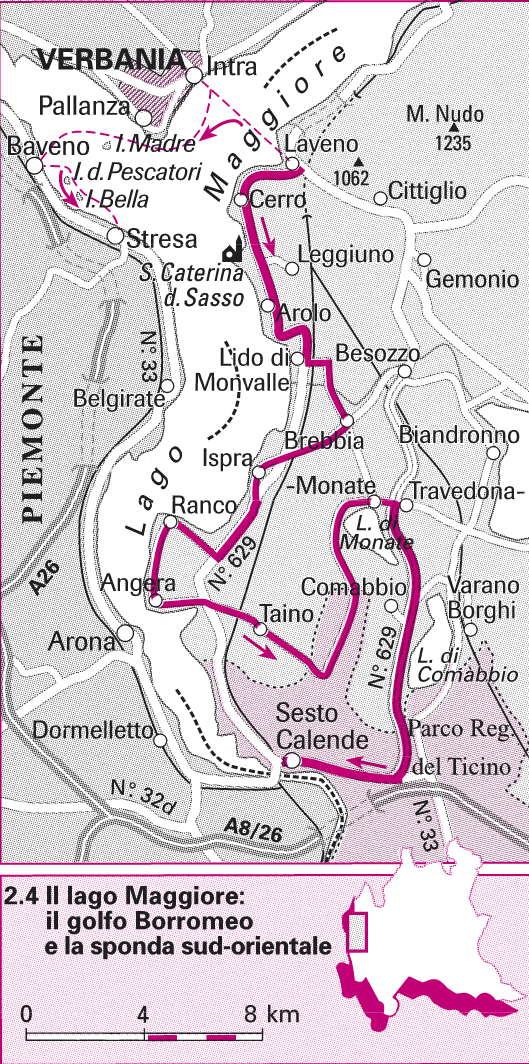
Map of Lake Maggiore: the Borromean Gulf and the south‑eastern shore

Lake Maggiore (UK: /mæˈdʒɔːreɪ, ˌmædʒiˈɔːreɪ/, US: /mɑːˈdʒɔːreɪ, məˈdʒɔːri/; Italian: Lago Maggiore Italian pronunciation: [ˈlaːɡo madˈdʒoːre]; Western Lombard: Lagh Maggior; Piedmontese: Lagh Magior; literally 'greater lake') or Verbano (pronounced [verˈbaːno]; Latin: Lacus Verbanus) is a large lake on the south side of the Alps divided between the Italian regions of Piedmont and Lombardy to the south, and the Swiss canton of Ticino to the north. Located halfway between Lake Orta and Lake Lugano, Lake Maggiore extends for about 64 kilometres (40 miles) between Locarno and Arona. It is the second largest lake in Italy and the largest in southern Switzerland.

The climate is mild in both summer and winter, producing Mediterranean vegetation, with many gardens growing rare and exotic plants. Well-known gardens include those of the Borromean and Brissago Islands, that of the Villa Taranto in Verbania, and the Alpinia Botanical Garden above Stresa.

Lake Maggiore is drained by the river Ticino, a main tributary of the Po. Its basin also collects the waters of several large lakes, notably Lake Lugano (through the Tresa), Lake Orta (through the Toce) and Lake Varese (through the Bardello).

== Geography ==
Lake Maggiore is 64.37 km (40 mi) long, and 3 to 5 km (2 to 3 mi) wide, except at the bay opening westward between Pallanza and Stresa, where it is 10 km (6 mi) wide. It is the longest Italian lake, and second to Lake Garda in area. Its mean height above the sea level is 193 m (633 ft) ; a deep lake, its bottom is almost everywhere below sea-level: at its deepest, 179 m (587 ft) below. Its form is very sinuous so that there are few points from which any considerable part of its surface can be seen at a single glance. If this lessens the effect of the apparent size, it increases the variety of its scenery. While the upper end is completely alpine in character, the middle region lies between hills of gentler form, and the lower end advances to the verge of the plain of Lombardy. Lake Maggiore is the most westerly of the three great southern prealpine lakes, the others being Lake Como and Lake Garda.

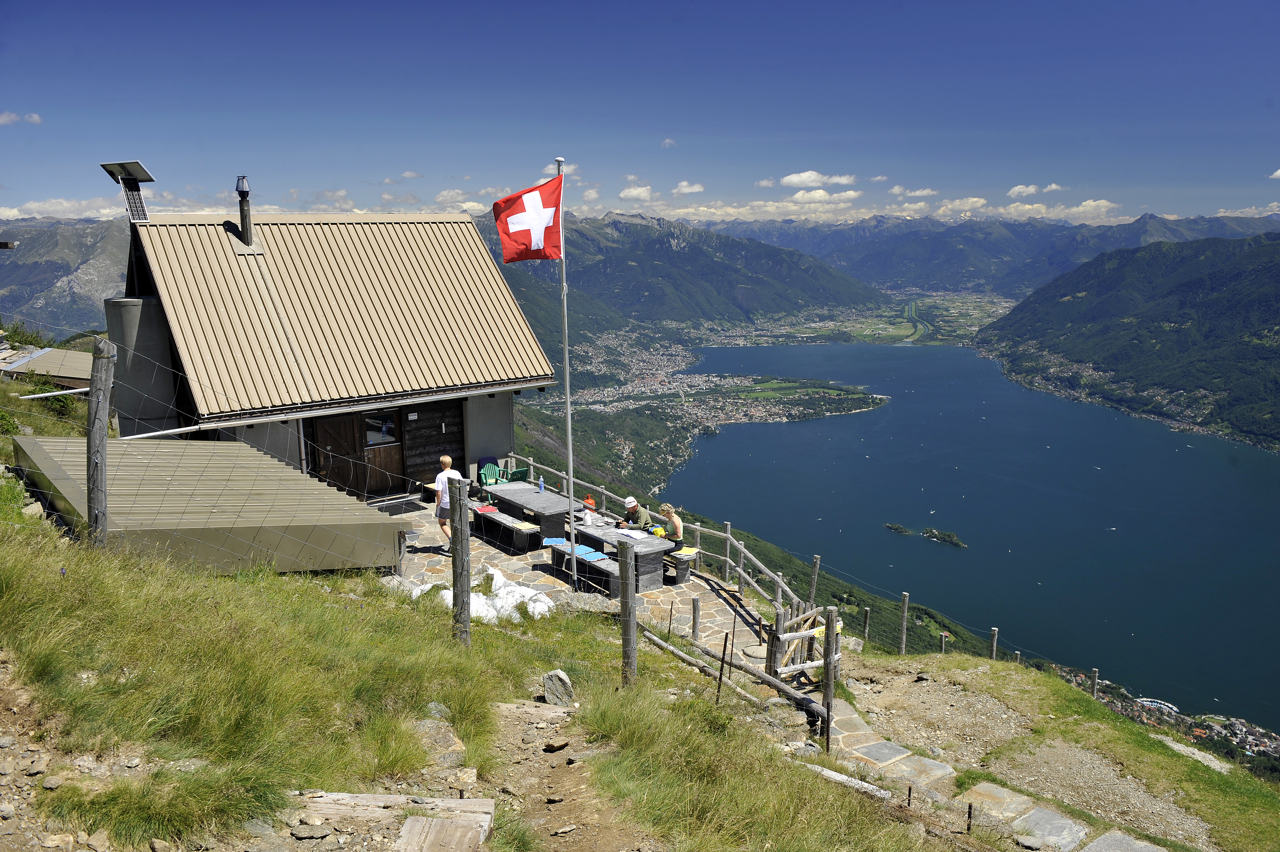
Upper lake with the Brissago Islands and Maggia delta from above Brissago, Switzerland

The lake basin has tectonic-glacial origins and its volume is 37 cubic kilometres (9 cu mi). The lake has a surface area of about 213 square kilometres (82 sq mi), a maximum length of 54 km (34 mi) (on a straight line) and, at its widest, is 12 km (7 mi). Its main tributaries are the Ticino, the Maggia (forming a very large delta), the Toce (by which it receives the outflow of Lake Orta) and the Tresa (which is the sole emissary of Lake Lugano). The rivers Verzasca, Giona, and Cannobino also flow into the lake. Its outlet is the Ticino which, in turn, joins the river Po just south-east of Pavia.

The lake's jagged banks are surrounded by the Pennine and Lepontine Alps, and Lugano Prealps. Prominent peaks around the lake are the Gridone, Monte Tamaro, Monte Nudo and the Mottarone. The highest mountain overlooking Lake Maggiore is Monte Rosa (4,634 m; 15,203 ft), about 50 kilometres (31 mi) west of it. The western bank is in Piedmont (provinces of Novara and Province of Verbano-Cusio-Ossola) and the eastern in Lombardy (province of Varese), whereas the most northerly section extends 13 kilometres (8 mi) into the canton of Ticino, where it constitutes its lowest point above sea level as well as that of Switzerland. The culminating point of the lake's drainage basin is the Grenzgipfel summit of Monte Rosa at 4,618 metres (15,151 ft) above sea level.

=== Climate ===
Lake Maggiore weather is humid subtropical (Cfa in the Köppen climate classification). During winter, the lake helps to maintain a higher temperature in the surrounding region (since water releases heat energy more slowly than air). The temperatures are cooled down in summer by the breezes that blow on the water's surface, changing its colour. The area enjoys nearly 2300 hours of sunshine a year and an average annual temperature of 15.5 °C (60 °F). The water of the lake has a comfortable temperature of 20 to 22 °C (68 to 72 °F) in July and August. In winter snowfall is erratic and primarily affects the higher elevations. Rainfall is heaviest in May and lowest during the winter months.

=== Flora and fauna ===
The flora is strongly influenced by the lake basin, which has allowed the proliferation of typically Mediterranean plants, and also of plants native to the Atlantic areas favoured by the composition of the soil and the abundance of siliceous rocks. Lemons, olive trees and bay olive trees grow there. The spontaneous vegetation is composed of yew, holly and chestnut trees on the surrounding hills.

The lake is a habitat to two species of whitefish, Coregonus and, less widespread, Coregonus lavaretus. Both live in deep water and come ashore only during the spawning in early December. There are also perch, pike, chub, burbot, torpedo, eels and Alburnus arborella. The lake is home to several species of nesting waterfowl, it also represents an important corridor, a place of rest and feeding for migrations. For example: common merganser, mute swan, grebes, gulls, cormorants, ducks.

A number of exotic species have established themselves in the lake, including pikeperch, which has been recorded since 1977; wels catfish, which was first noticed in the early 1990s; and ruffe, introduced in the mid-1990s. Wels catfish in excess of 50 kg in weight have been fished from the lake.

== Towns and villages on the lake ==
Switzerland, Canton of Ticino	Italy, Piedmont Region Province of Verbano-Cusio-Ossola and Province of Novara	Italy, Lombardy Region Province of Varese
Ranzo; Gerra; San Nazzaro; Vira; Magadino; Tenero; Locarno; Ascona; Ronco sopra Ascona; Brissago; Minusio; Muralto	Cannobio; Cannero Riviera; Oggebbio; Ghiffa; Verbania; Baveno; Stresa; Belgirate; Lesa; Meina; Arona; Dormelletto; Castelletto sopra Ticino	Sesto Calende; Angera; Ranco; Ispra; Brebbia; Besozzo; Monvalle; Leggiuno; Laveno-Mombello; Castelveccana; Porto Valtravaglia; Brezzo di Bedero; Germignaga; Luino; Maccagno; Tronzano Lago Maggiore; Pino sulla Sponda del Lago Maggiore

== Islands ==
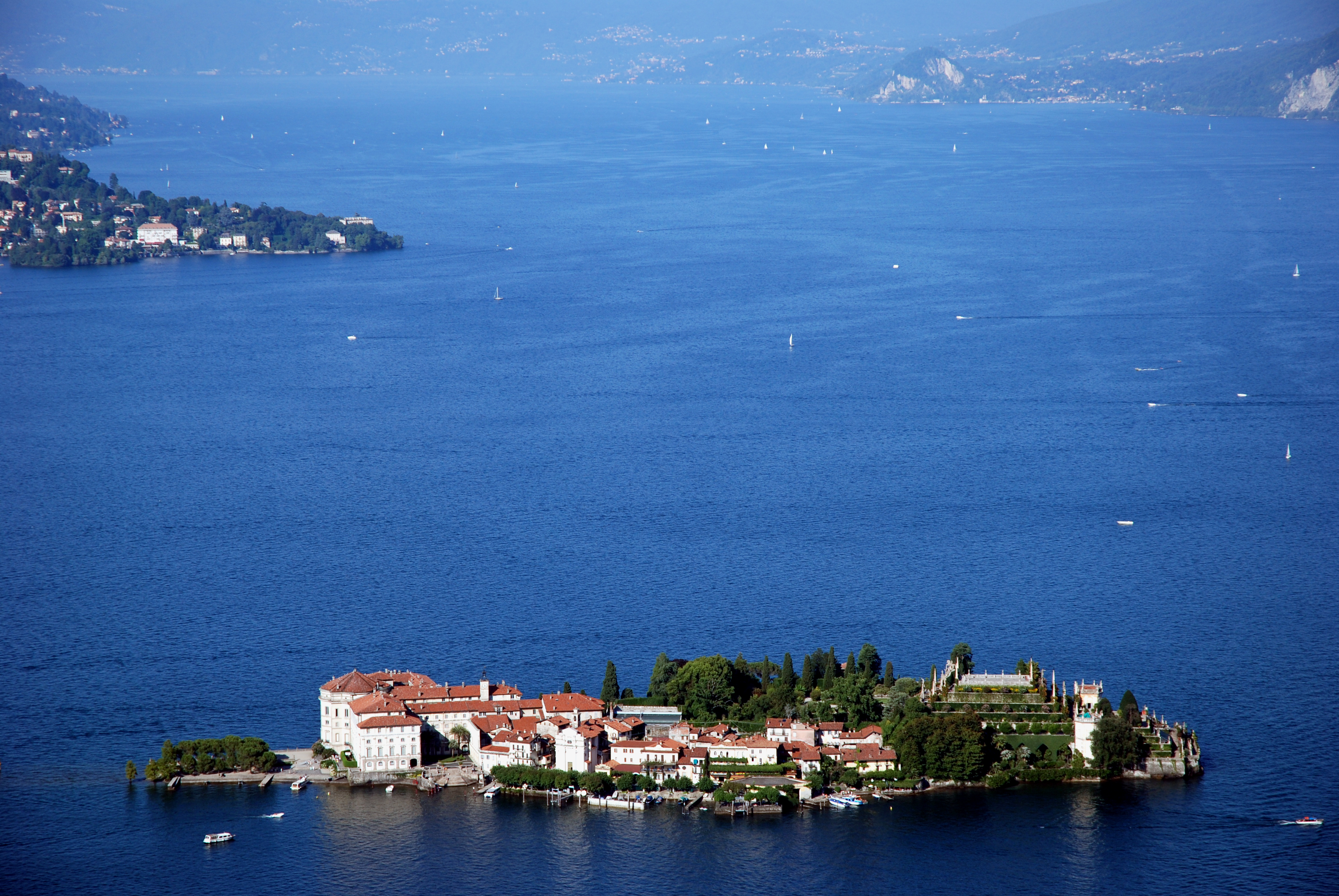
Isola Bella

- Borromean Islands (three islands and two islets between Verbania to the north and Stresa to the south)
  - Isola Bella
  - Isola Madre
  - Isola dei Pescatori (or Isola Superiore)
  - Isolino di San Giovanni (in front of Verbania)
  - Scoglio della Malghera (between Isola Bella and Isola Pescatori)
- Brissago Islands (close to Brissago)
  - San Pancrazio (or Grande Isola)
  - Isolino (or Isola Piccola or Isola di Sant’Apollinare)
- Castelli di Cannero (three small islands just off the shore from Cannero Riviera)
- Isolino Partegora (in the gulf of Angera)

== Sacro Monte di Ghiffa ==
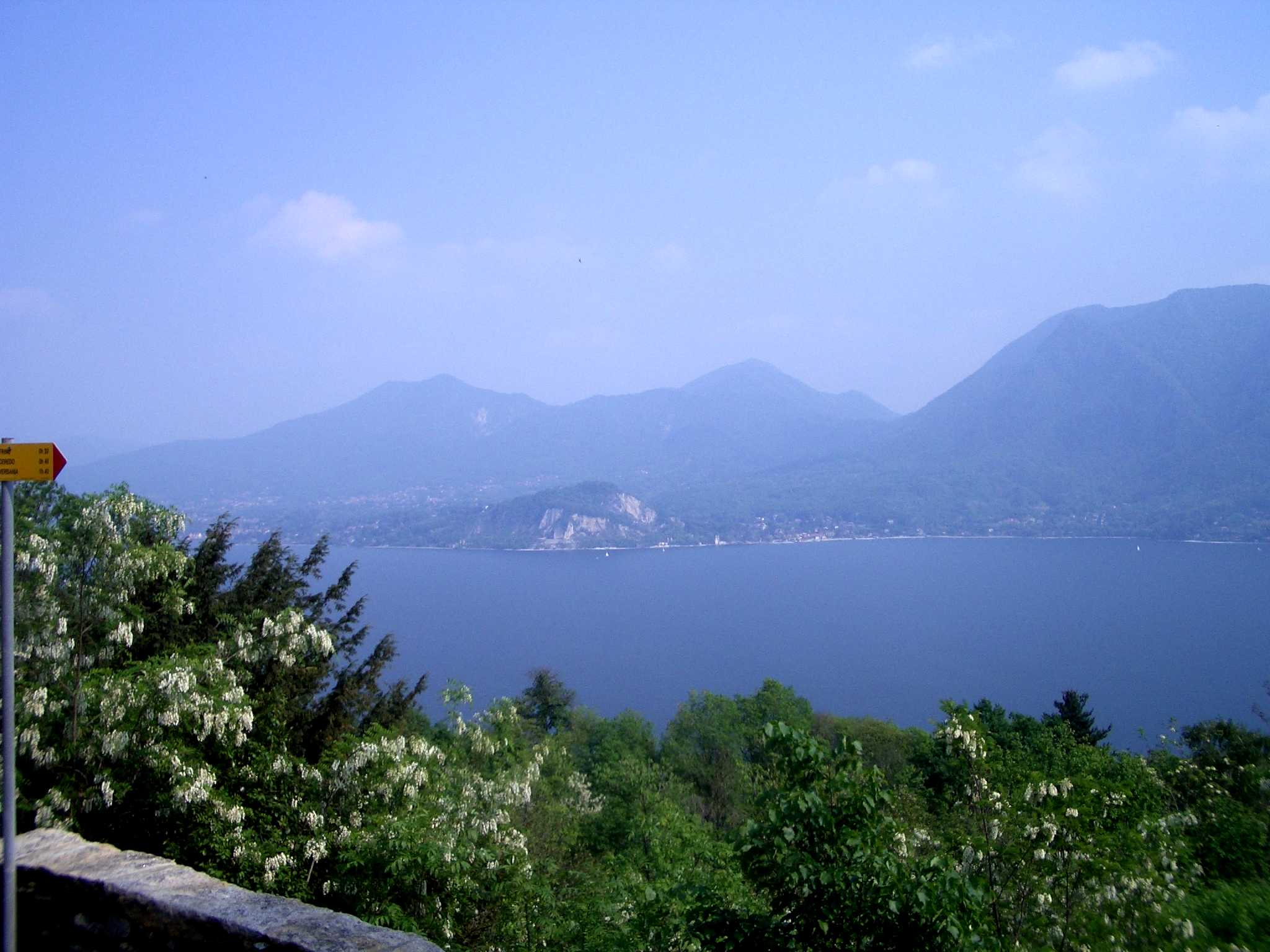
Sacro Monte di Ghiffa

The Sacred Mountain of Ghiffa is a Roman Catholic devotional complex in the comune of Ghiffa, (Piedmont, northern Italy), overlooking Lake Maggiore. It is one of the nine Sacri Monti of Piedmont and Lombardy, included in the UNESCO World Heritage list.

== Events ==
The Spirit of Woodstock Festival is an annual open air festival at the end of July/beginning of August. It is organized in Armeno by the Mirapuri community.

== Transport ==
Boat transport on the lake, including car ferries, is provided by Gestione Governativa Navigazione Laghi (Navigazione Laghi). The regular boat lines connect piers of lakeside towns and villages, in both Italy and Switzerland, with each other and with the Borromean and Brissago islands.

The Locarno–Cadenazzo, Cadenazzo–Luino and Luino–Milan railway lines follow the eastern shore of the lake, while the Domodossola–Milan railway runs along the southern part of the western shore. Regional train services are operated by Trenord and TiLo. There is no railway line along the northwestern shore (between Locarno and Verbania), but further north there is a railway line between Domodossola and Locarno.

== History ==
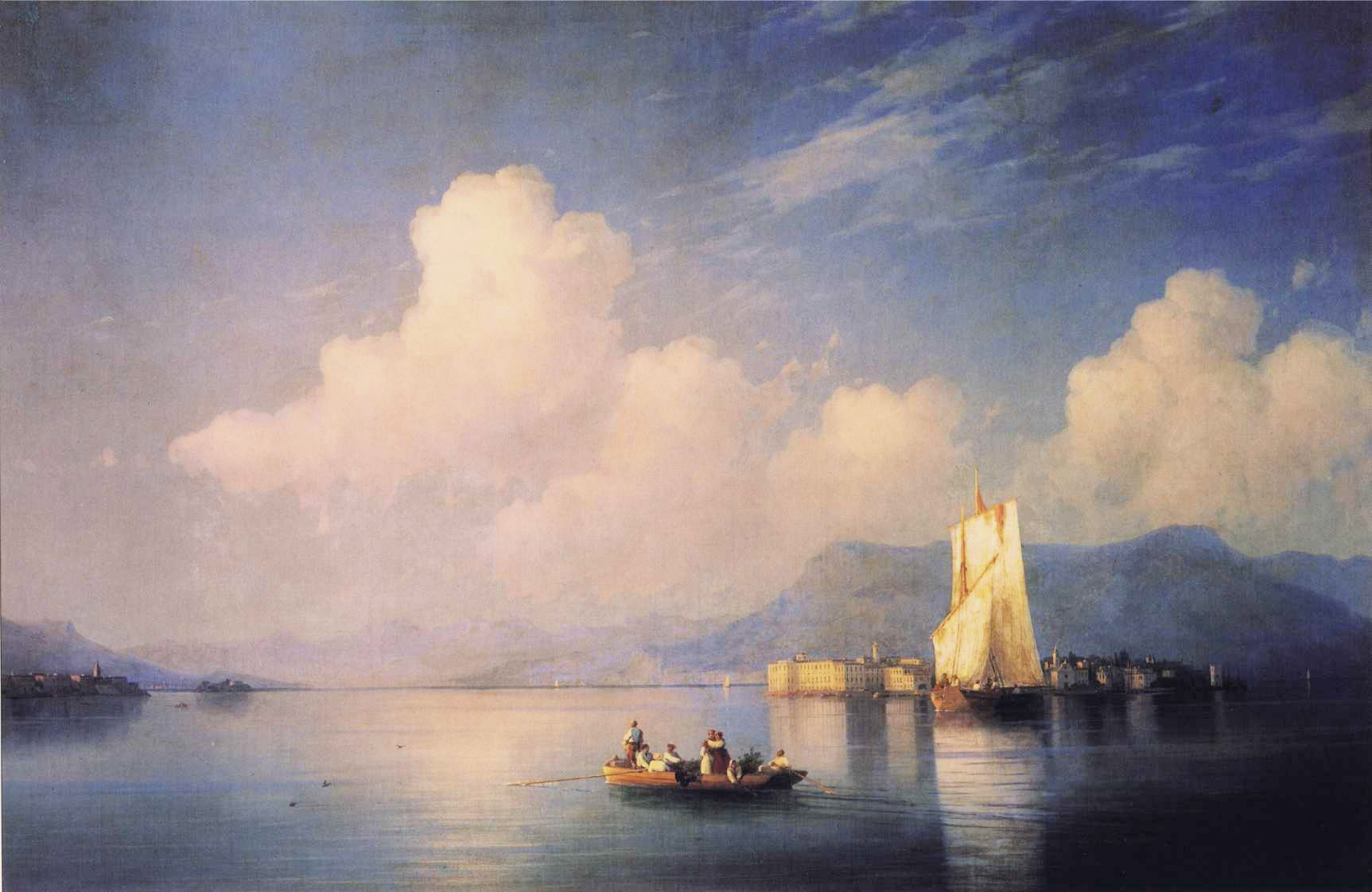
Lake Maggiore in the Evening by Ivan Aivazovsky, 1858

The first archaeological findings around the lake belong to nomadic people living in the area in prehistoric types. The first settlements discovered date from the Copper Age. Along the shores of the lake, between the 9th and 4th centuries BC. J.-C., the Golasecca culture, a Celtic civilization of the Iron Age developed. The latter was in turn conquered by the Romans, who called the lake Verbanus Lacus or Lacus Maximus. In Roman times a maritime line was created that linked the lake, thanks to Ticino, to Pavia, from where the ships would then continue along the Po to the Adriatic Sea.

After the fall of the Western Roman Empire, the lake was under different domains. Most of the current settlements originated in the Middle Ages when the lake was under the Della Torre, Visconti, the Borromeo and Habsburg families.

Clashes also took place on the waters of the lake between military fleets, such as in 1263, when the Della Torre ships fought against those of the Visconti near Arona or, between 1523 and 1524, when the Borromeo clashed against Francesco II Sforza and in 1636 between French and Spanish always in the waters between Arona and Angera.

From the fourteenth century until the end of the eighteenth century, navigation on the lake and on the Ticino was also used to transport the heavy blocks of marble obtained from the quarries around the lake towards the main Lombard construction sites: the cathedral of Milan and the Certosa di Pavia.

Methane was first discovered and isolated by Alessandro Volta as he analysed marsh gas from Lake Maggiore, between 1776 and 1778.

From the middle of the 19th century, the lake began to experience strong tourist development, particularly after Queen Victoria's stay in Baveno in 1879.

In 1936, a Bugatti Type 22 Brescia Roadster, built in 1925, was sunk in the lake by employees of Zürich architect Marco Schmucklerski, when Swiss customs officials investigated whether he had paid taxes on the car. The Bugatti was attached to an iron chain making it possible to recover it once the investigation was over, yet that never happened. When the chain corroded, the car sunk to the lake bed, where it was rediscovered on 18 August 1967 by local diver Ugo Pillon and became a favourite target for divers thereafter. When one of the divers, Damiano Tamagni, was killed in a hold-up on 1 February 2008, his friends from the Ascona divers' club decided to lift and sell the car wreck to raise funds for a yet-to-be-created foundation named after the victim. The remains of the Bugatti were recovered on 12 July 2009. The sale took place at the Retro Mobile classic car exhibition in Paris on 23 January 2010. It was sold for €260,500.

In May 2021, a cable car collapsed near the lake, killing 14 people.

In May 2023 a boat capsized in a storm while travelling between Arona and Sesto Calende, killing 4 people. Among the dead were 2 Italian intelligence agents as well as a former agent of Mossad.

== The Hotel Meina incident at Lake Maggiore ==
This incident is part of the Lake Maggiore massacres during WWII.

Meina is a municipality 77 kilometres (48 miles) northwest of Milan, on the southern shores of Lake Maggiore. The Hotel Meina was north of the town of Meina and was owned by Alberto and Eugenia Behar, Sephardic Jews who had moved to Italy from Constantinople. In September 1943, an armistice was declared between Italy and the Allies. At that time, the Hotel Meina housed a number of Jewish guests, most of them escapees of the Nazi occupation of Greece. The area around Lake Maggiore was not under Allied control but was occupied by the German Waffen-SS, specifically the infamous Leibstandarte SS Adolf Hitler. Captain Hans Krüger, who directed operations in Meina and the surrounding villages, was in charge of locating the Jews in that area and was responsible for the Lake Maggiore massacres in which about 54 Jews were murdered.

On the night of 22 September 1943, most of the Jewish residents of the Hotel Meina were executed and their bodies were thrown into Lake Maggiore. The Fernandez-Diaz family, a family of Greek Sephardic Jews from Thessaloniki, barricaded themselves in one of the fourth-floor hotel rooms. It took an extra day for the Germans to reach and execute them. The family included three young children whose lives were not spared despite pleas from older family members. Among those killed were Dino Fernandez-Diaz (76 years old), Pierre Fernandez-Diaz (46), Liliane (Scialom) Fernandez-Diaz (36), Jean Fernandez-Diaz (17), Robert Fernandez-Diaz (13), Blanchette Fernandez-Diaz (12), Marco Mosseri (55), Ester Botton (52), Giacomo Renato Mosseri (22), Odette Uziel (19), Raoul Torres (48), Valerie Nahoum Torres (49), and Daniele Modiano (51). In total, sixteen Jewish residents of the hotel were executed. Its owners, the Behar family, survived due to the efforts of the Turkish consulate.

The Italian police report on the Meina massacre was lost but resurfaced in 1994, along with hundreds of other files of war crimes committed post-armistice by Germans who still occupied or were retreating from Italian soil. These files had been hidden in a wooden cabinet, the so-called "cabinet of shame", discovered in a storeroom of the military prosecutor's headquarters.

Germany does not extradite its citizens convicted of war crimes in other countries. Those responsible for the Meina massacre were tried at home in Germany in 1968, convicted and sentenced to life in prison. However, in 1970, the German Supreme Court declared the statute of limitations for those particular war crimes to have expired, and the prisoners were released.

== References in literature and popular culture ==
Lake Maggiore is featured in American writer Ernest Hemingway's novel A Farewell to Arms. The protagonist (Frederic Henry) and his lover (Catherine Barkley) are forced to cross the transnational border within the lake in a row boat to escape Italian carabinieri.

It also appeared as the location of a fictional racetrack in the racing game Gran Turismo Sport and Gran Turismo 7.

Die Flippers, a German Schlager group wrote a song called "Lago Maggiore" that appears on their 1990 album Sieben Tage Sonnenschein.

== See also ==
- Italian Lakes
- List of lakes of Italy
- List of lakes of Switzerland
