= Pallanza =

Town in Italy

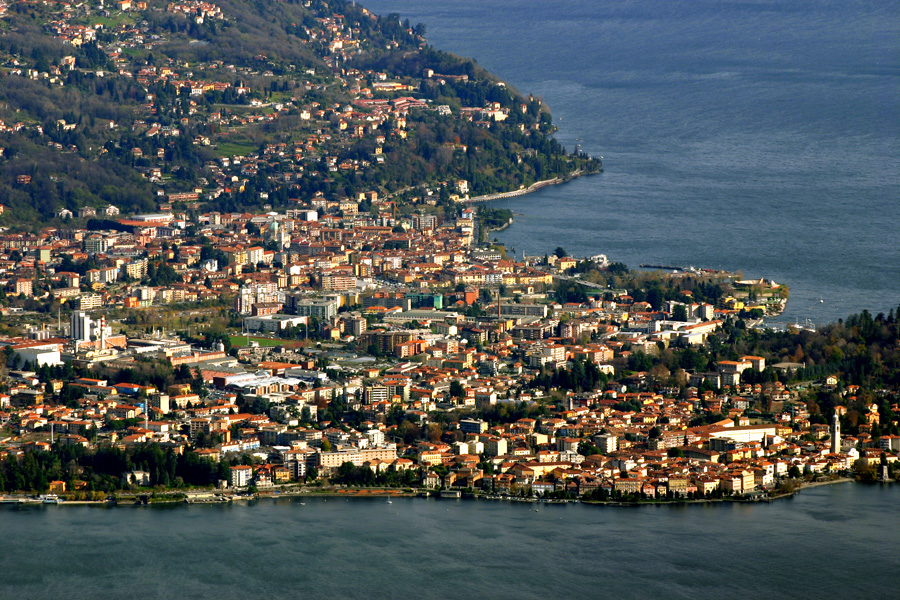
Aerial view of Pallanza

Pallanza is a district of the Italian comune (municipality) of Verbania. It is located in the Province of Verbano-Cusio-Ossola, on the bank of Lake Maggiore.

== History ==
Pallanza was autonomous until 1939 when it was merged with Intra to form Verbania under the royal decree n. 702 of 4 April 1939.

Pallanza hosted the 1906 European Rowing Championships.
