= Sacro Monte di Arona =

Coordinates: 45°46′13″N 8°32′36″E

The Sacro Monte di Arona, devoted to Charles Borromeo, is part of the Sacri Monti built in the 16th and 17th centuries. It is located in the territory of the town of Arona, province of Novara, region of Piedmont, Italy.

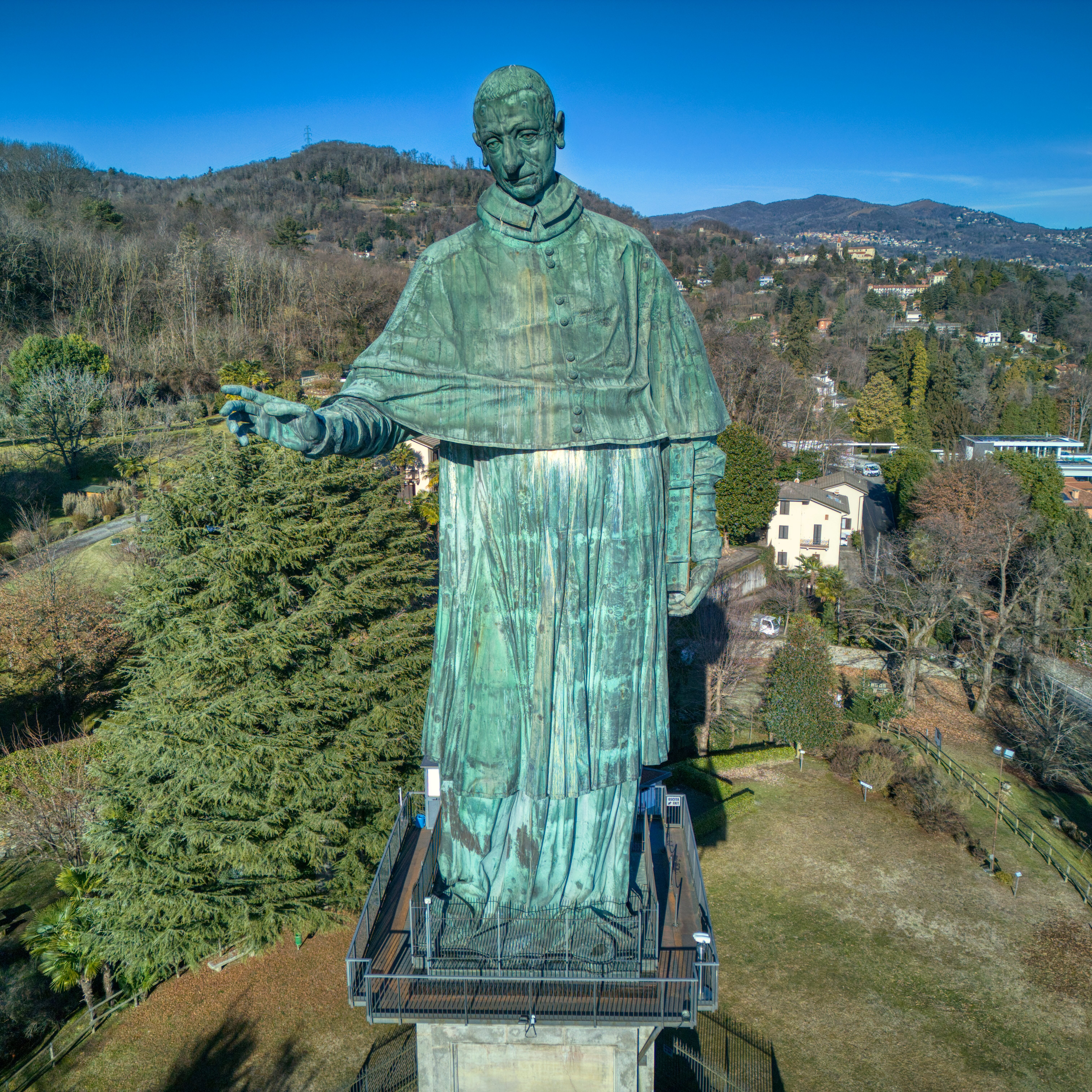
Statue of Saint Charles

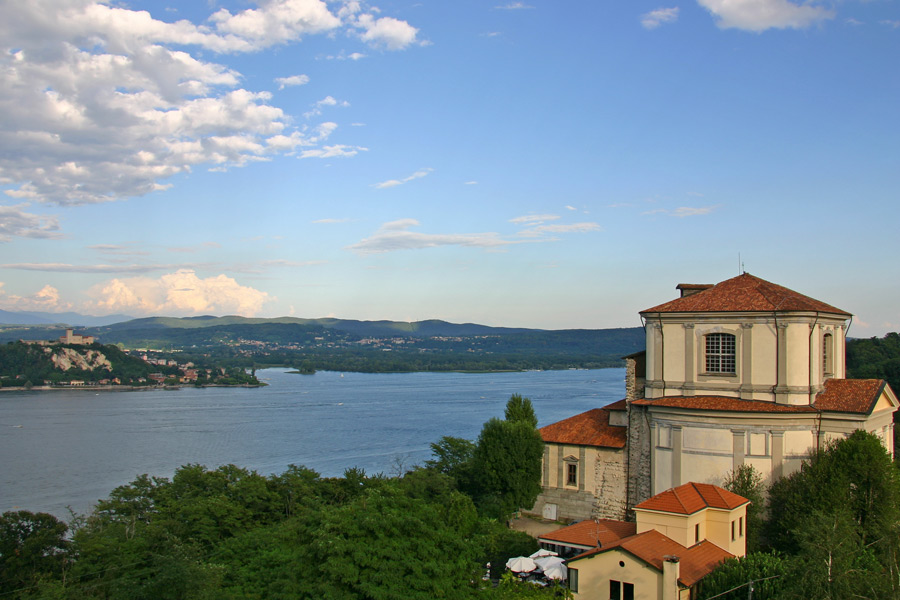
From the colossus: the church of Saint Charles

== History and art ==
Around 1610 (when Charles Borromeo was canonized) father Marco Aurelio Grattarola had the idea of building a Sacro Monte devoted to Saint Charles on a hill behind his native town. The work was intended to celebrate the archbishop of Milan in the territory of his family.

The greatness of the figure inspired the idea of a huge statue visible from the opposite side of the Lake Maggiore. The initiative received the support of Federico Borromeo, who succeeded the cousin as archbishop of Milan.

The architect Francesco Maria Richini was charged with the project. He proposed an ambitious project, only partially realised. Starting with a triumphal arch, three paths should have started, each one with five chapels illustrating the life of Saint Charles and his spirituality.

In July 1614 Federico Borromeo celebrated the start of the construction. One of the first buildings to be completed was the church, designed by Richini as a central plan church.

Only a few chapels were built. Today only three remain, but without the decorations. For the realisation of the statues artists involved in the construction of the Sacro Monte di Varallo came.

The death of father Grattarola in 1615, the plague of 1629-1631 and the death of Federico Borromeo in 1631 interrupted the works. Only in 1692, the Borromeo family started again the construction. The new project, made by the architect Carlo Fontana, was far more modest than the original.

The sanctuary was completed only in 1725 with the building of the roof. Today over the main altar there is a painting by Giulio Cesare Procaccini; behind the altar has been reconstructed the original room of Saint Charles with the furniture coming from the Rocca Borromea nearby.

In front of the church, on the opposite side of the square, is " Saint Charles' seminary". From the square, a stairway takes you to the colossal statue of Saint Charles. The statue's design was made by Giovanni Battista Crespi, called il Cerano.

The statue, 28 m in height, commonly called Sancarlone, was realised in 1698. It is an empty structure made of wrought copper. It is possible to climb up to the head thanks to an inner stairway. Only the Statue of Liberty is a taller metal statue.

== Bibliography ==
- Centini, Massimo, I Sacri Monti nell'arco alpino italiano, Priuli & Verlucca, Ivrea, 1990
- Zanzi Luigi, Zanzi Paolo, (a cura di), Atlante dei Sacri Monti prealpini, Skira, Milan, 2002;

== See also ==
- Charles Borromeo
- Federico Borromeo
- Sancarlone
- CoEur - In the heart of European paths
- Path of Saint Charles
