= CoEur devotional path =

Devotional and hiking route in Italy and Switzerland

CoEur is a Christian devotional and hiking route in Italy and Switzerland. Its Italian subtitle, Nel cuore dei cammini d'Europa, translates as "In the heart of Europe's paths".

== History of the route ==
The path CoEUR was created in the late 1990s, when information about Saint Charles Borromeo's trips in the northern Piedmont was discovered, leading to the initiation of the Path of Saint Charles (Cammino di San Carlo) between Arona, the town where the Archbishop was born, and Viverone, the town where the Via Francigena passes through the province of Biella.

This track has been used as a starting point for the CoEUR path, which links all the devotional places along Lake Maggiore up to Locarno. In its ideal prosecution, the path reaches Einsiedeln Abbey connecting the Via Francigena with the Camino de Santiago in its Swiss section, named Via Jacobi.

This combination of paths creates a connection between two sanctuaries consecrated to the black Madonna: Oropa and Einsiedeln.

== Sectors of the route ==
=== Path of Saint Charles ===
This path follows routes made by Saint Charles Borromeo during his many pilgrimages through Lake Maggiore, Lake Orta, the Sesia valley, the Biellese territory and Canavese.

Twelve stages connect Arona with the Via Francigena in Viverone, passing by three Sacri Monti and many sanctuaries of the Verbano, Cusio and Biellese territories.

=== Via delle Genti ===
This route starts in Arona, runs along Lake Maggiore as far as Brissago, Locarno, and Bellinzona, and continues towards the Gotthard Pass, that connects the southern Swiss cantons (Valais and Ticino) with the central cantons of (Uri and Graubünden).

=== Via Spiritualità ===
This path connects Domodossola and Baceno with the Swiss town Ernen along ancient mule tracks.

From Domodossola, the way goes along the Toce river through the Antigorio valley, as far as the Arbola Pass, connecting Italy and Valais, and afterwards ends up in Ernen.

From Domodossola, the way continues towards Verbania and the main path of CoEUR passing through Ornavasso, with its cycle paths.

=== Via del Mercato ===
This historic way starts in Domodossola and goes through the Valle Vigezzo and the Centovalli as far as Locarno. The track uses trails and mule tracks of the ancient Via del Mercato, the way on which merchants from Italy and Switzerland transported goods. In the early 20th century, the Centovalli railway was built in order to develop commerce, and nowadays it is a major tourist attraction.

This path includes the Santuario della Madonna del Sangue in Re, a destination of many pilgrimages from the neighbourhood, halfway between the Ossola valley and Lake Maggiore.

=== The ring of Saint Charles ===
In the Cannobio valley there is a network of paths connecting the numerous villages in the valley associated with Charles Borromeo's visits to the Pieve of Cannobio.

== The UNESCO sites ==
The CoEUR path connects nine UNESCO World Heritage Sites.

Two in Switzerland:

- Monte San Giorgio
- Three Castles of Bellinzona

Seven in Italy:

- Five out of nine Sacri Monti of Piedmont and Lombardy:
  - Sacro Monte di Oropa
  - Sacro Monte di Varallo
  - Sacro Monte di Orta
  - Sacro Monte di Ghiffa
  - Sacro Monte di Domodossola
- Two Prehistoric pile dwellings around the Alps:
  - VI.1-Emissario by the Viverone Lake
  - Mercurago by Arona

== Natural reserves ==
Along the way, there are many nature parks and natural reserves.

- National park of the Locarnese territory (CH) - Waiting for law approval
- Forest reserve of Palagnedra (CH)
- Forest reserve of the Sacred wood of Mergugno (CH)
- Bolle di Magadino Natural Reserve (CH)
- Val Grande National Park
- Alpe Veglia and Alpe Devero Natural Park
- Alta Valle Antrona Natural Park
- Fondo Toce Natural Reserve
- Lagoni di Mercurago Natural Park
- Monte Fenera Natural Park
- Parco Burcina Natural Reserve
- Bessa Natural Reserve
- Sacro Monte di Varallo Natural Reserve
- Sacro Monte di Orta Natural Reserve
- Sacro Monte di Oropa Natural Reserve
- Protected area of the Oasi Zegna
- SCI of the Valsessera

== See also ==
- Camino de Santiago
- Via Francigena
- UNESCO
