= Santi Martiri, Arona =

Building in Arona, Piedmont, Italy

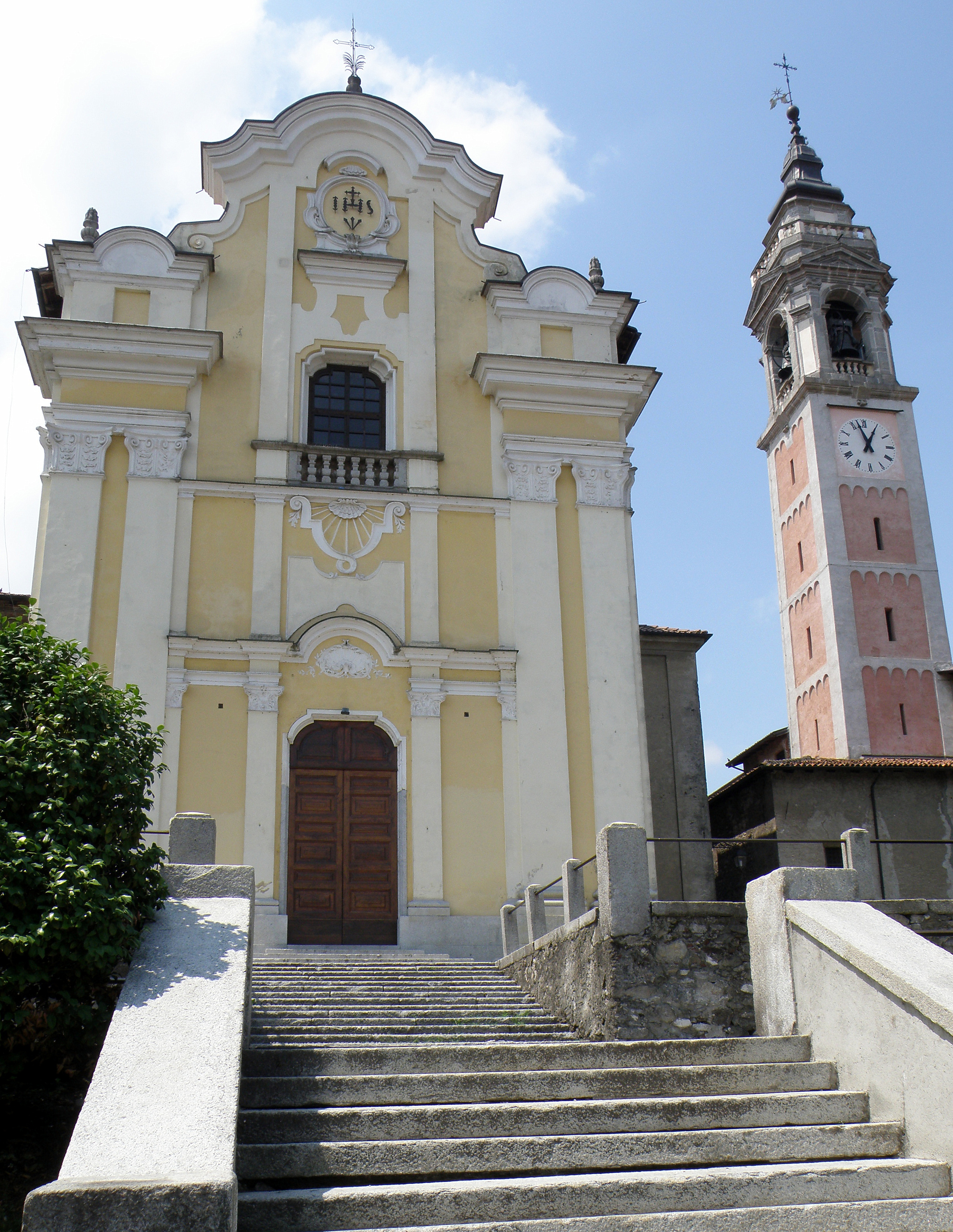

Santi Martiri also known as Chiesa di San Graziano is the Roman Catholic church located on a hill above Piazza San Graziano in the town of Arona, Province of Novara, Piedmont, Italy.

== History ==
The church was founded adjacent to a Benedictine abbey in the 10th century but was rebuilt over the centuries. The church held custody of the Holy Martyrs, patrons of Arona. The present church has a Baroque façade added by the Jesuits, who were assigned the church and monastery by Cardinal Carlo Borromeo in 1572 and remained till their suppression in 1773.

The interior retains Gothic elements of architecture and consists of a single nave with four lateral chapels. The fresco decoration was added between 1850 and 1852.

The main altar has a 15th-century painting depicting an Enthroned Madonna between Angels and Saints by Ambrogio da Fossano, called il Bergognone. The church also has a painting by Palma il Giovane. The altar has bas-reliefs depicting the four Martyrs, whose relics are sheltered here. The relics of Graziano and Felino were brought here from Perugia in 979, and those of Fedele and Carpoforo were brought from Como in 1200. During the 16th century, Cardinal Borromeo decided to move the relics to the church of San Fedele in Milan. However, protests by the people of Arona forced their restitution on 13 March 1576. That date is a local holiday called "Tredicino".
