= Bernardo Falcone =

Italian sculptor

Bernardo Falcone (c. 1620 in Bissone – c. 1696) was an Italian-Swiss sculptor of the Early Baroque.

== Life ==
Bernardo Falcone was born to Domenico Falcone from Rovio and Lucia Grighi from Venice. He lived in Bissone, as evidenced by an inventory of his estates from 1676 and 1677. He worked as a sculptor mainly in Venice and left numerous statues in its churches and schools among which are the churches of Santi Giovanni e Paolo, Santa Maria Gloriosa dei Frari, San Zanipolo, and the Scalzi.

In Parma he worked on the statuary of Saint John the Evangelist. In 1682, he worked on four statues for the basilica of Santa Giustina in Padua and in 1694 on the colossal statue of Saint Charles Borromeo in Arona. Various works in the churches of Rovigo are also attributed to him
