= Fondo Toce Natural Reserve =

Coordinates: 45.9333°N 8.4833°E

The Fondo Toce or Fondotoce (Italian pronunciation: [ˌfondoˈtoːtʃe]) Natural Reserve is a nature reserve established in 1990 in the Verbania municipality, which takes its name from the river Toce.

The area includes the Toce connection with Lake Maggiore, characterised by the widest lake's rushes, very important for the reproduction of fishes and migratory birds. The Great cormorants sleep here by the river and swallows stop here during migrations.

There are rare and native vegetals, like the water caltrop (Trapa natans verbanensis).

== See also ==
- CoEur - In the heart of European paths
