= Sacro Monte di Ghiffa =

Coordinates: 45°57′49″N 8°36′54″E

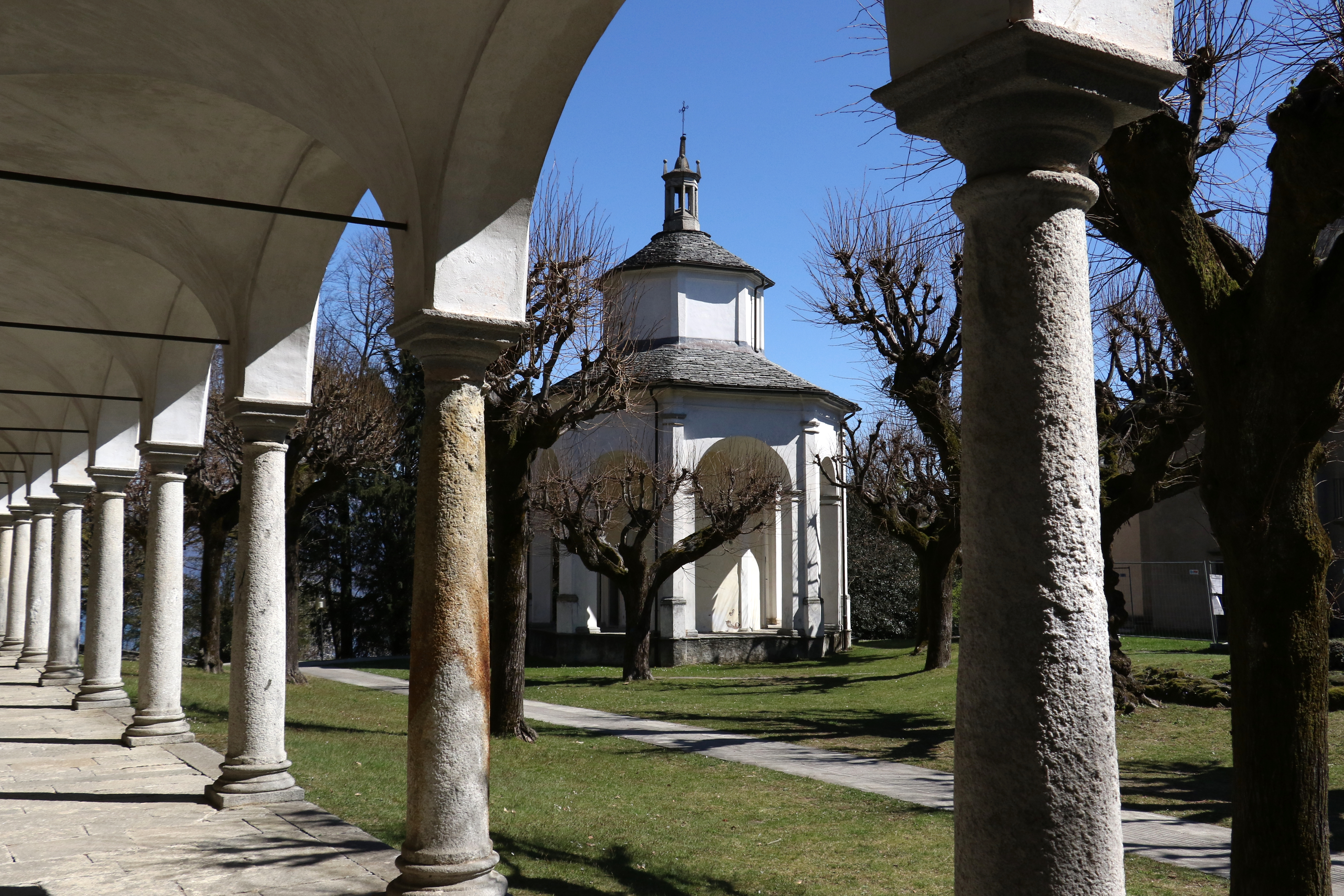
The portico of Via Crucis and the chapel of San Giovanni Battista

The Sacred Mountain of Ghiffa is a Roman Catholic devotional complex in the comune of Ghiffa, Piedmont, northern Italy, overlooking the Lake Maggiore. It is one of the nine Sacri Monti of Piedmont and Lombardy, included in UNESCO World Heritage list.

It is a stop-over on the CoEur devotional path.

== Description ==
The dedication to the mystery of the Trinity was influenced by a pre-existing small oratory on Mount Cariago. The panoramic view over the Piedmont side of Lake Maggiore displays a high level of compositional architecture and landscape research. The monumental complex is not homogeneous but remains incomplete and the authors and founders are anonymous. The Chapel of the Blessed Virgin Mary Crowned was the first to be constructed in 1647. The portico of Via Crucis, erected in the 17th century, underlines the shift from the themes of the Counter Reformation to that of the Passion of Christ.
