= Lagoni di Mercurago Natural Park =

Coordinates: 45.7350°N 8.5520°E

Parco naturale dei Lagoni di Mercurago
- IUCN category V (protected landscape/seascape)
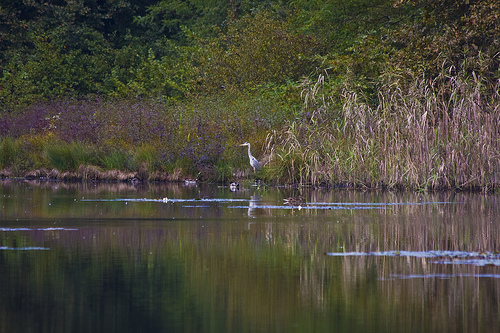
- Location: Piedmont
- Nearest city: Arona
- Area: 473 hectares
- Established: 1980
- Governing body: Ente di gestione delle aree protette del Ticino e del Lago Maggiore

The Lagoni di Mercurago Nature Park, established in 1980, is a natural reserve in Piedmont, located in Mercurago, a hamlet near Arona, consisting of many lakes with swamp vegetation.

== Landscape ==
Near Arona, on the morainic hills around Lake Maggiore, there is the Lagoni di Mercurago Nature Park which includes mires, pasture for horses and forests.

== Archaeology ==
Prehistorical remains of the Terramare culture dating back to the Bronze Age and some Roman domus were found in the area. The first stilt house in Italy, a wooden pirogue and three weels, was found here in 1860.

== Gallery ==
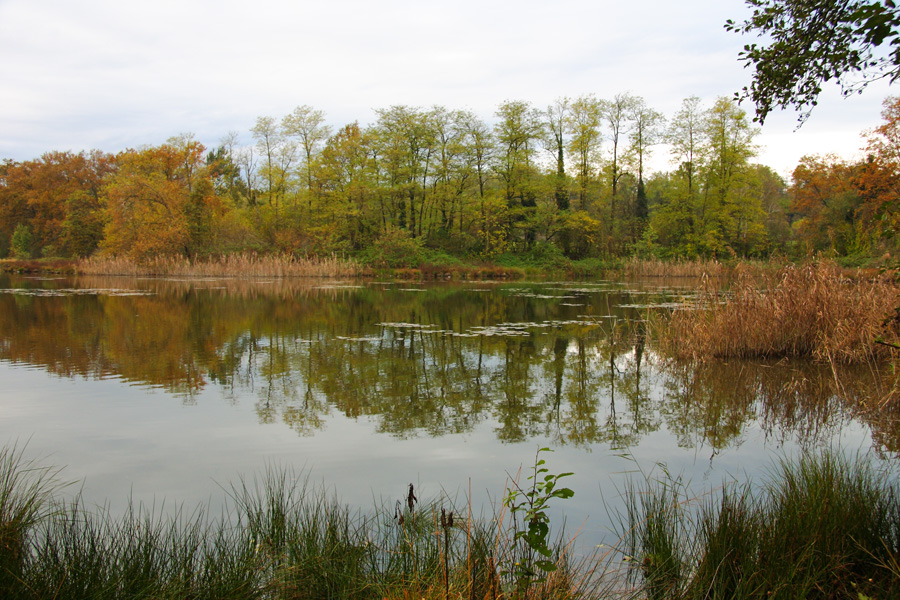
The "lagone" in the centre of the reserve

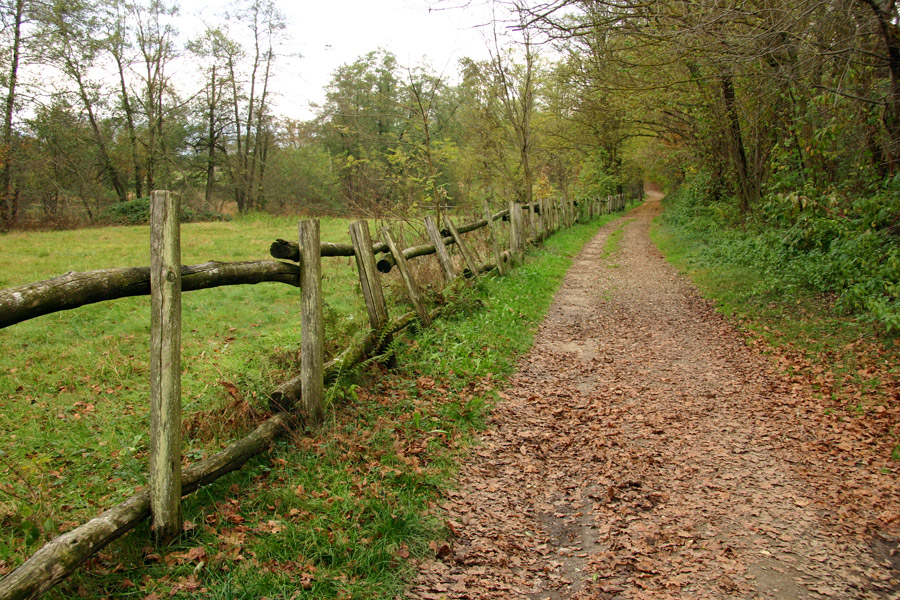
A path of the park

== See also ==
- CoEur - In the heart of European paths
