= Sacro Monte di Varallo Natural Reserve =

Coordinates: 45.8192°N 8.2565°E

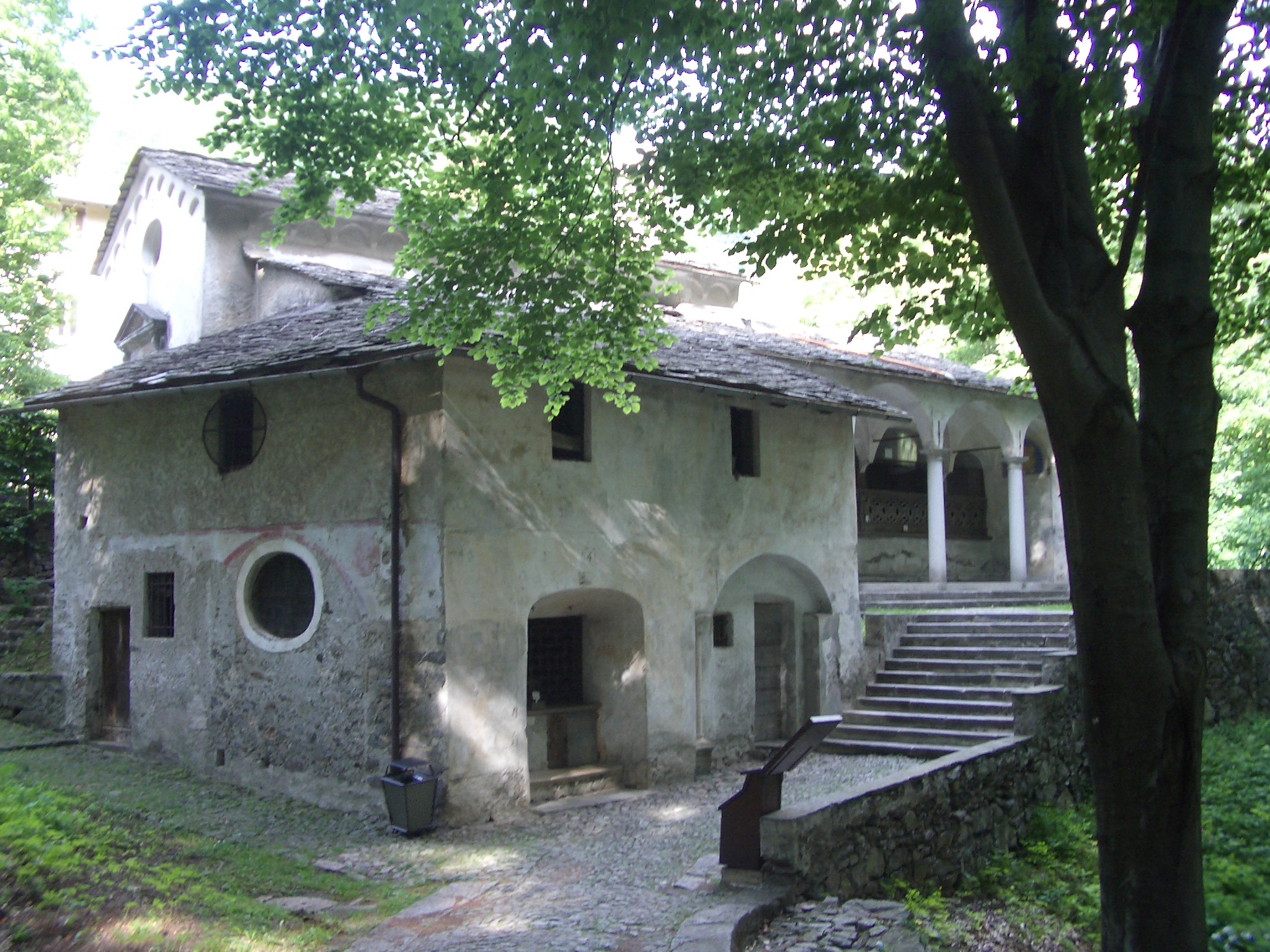
The Sacro Monte di Varallo

The Sacro Monte di Varallo Natural Reserve, that includes the wood around the Sacro Monte di Varallo, was established in 1980 in the Piedmont region.

== Visiting ==
The guided tours are organised by the Associazione Accompagnatori Naturalistici della Valsesia. They also organise guided tours for schools and environmental education activities and lessons.

== Features ==
The area has been modified throughout the years and it has also been abandoned. During the last years the wood has been restored as it is supposed it was during the Renaissance.

There are many alpine birds and trees, such as beech, box, holly, taxus and elm.

== See also ==
- Sacro Monte di Varallo
- CoEur - In the heart of European paths
- Path of Saint Charles
