= Alberto Gusmeroli =

Italian politician (born 1961)

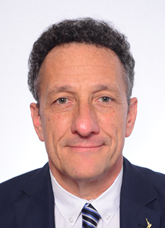
- Gusmeroli in 2022

Member of the Chamber of Deputies
- Incumbent
- Assumed office 23 March 2018
- Constituency: Piedmont 2 – U02 (2018–2022); Piedmont 2 – U02 (2022–present)

Personal details
- Born: 27 February 1961 (age 65)
- Party: Lega

Alberto Luigi Gusmeroli (born 27 February 1961) is an Italian politician serving as a member of the Chamber of Deputies since 2018. He has served as mayor of Arona since 2024, having previously served from 2010 to 2020.
