= Bolle di Magadino =

Coordinates: 46.1559°N 8.8648°E

Designations

Ramsar Wetland
- Designated: 18 February 1982
- Reference no.: 231

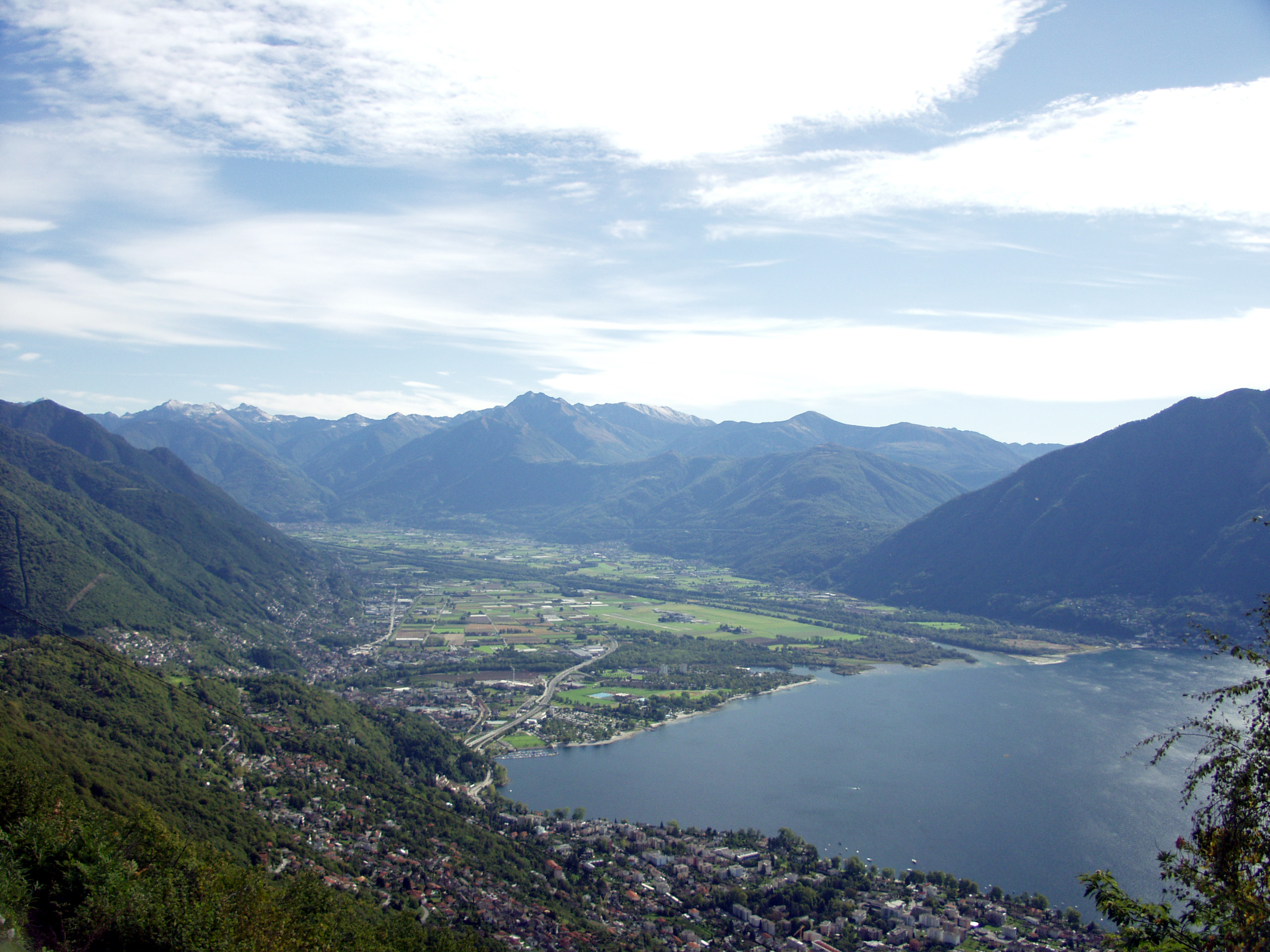
The area of the reserve

The Bolle di Magadino is a 1500-ha Swiss natural reserve. It is located by the confluence of the Ticino with Lake Maggiore. It is a biotope where birds nest and stop during migrations.

== History ==
Starting from 1888 the track of the Ticino river has been modified where it flows into the lake. Banks were built in 1908, and the reclamation of the Magadino area started in 1918. In 1924 dams were built in order to regulate the river. During World War II there lands have been cultivated.

After the war the terrains have been reclaimed and in 1965 the dam for the Verzasca River was completed.

After these works the vegetation of the area has changed. Since 1975 the site is run by the Bolle di Magadino foundation. In 1979 the area became cantonal reserve. In 1982 it has been enlisted in the UNESCO's Ramsar Convention for the protection of the moist areas. It has also been identified by BirdLife International as an Important Bird Area.

A research center for migratory birds has been created in 1994. It is part of the European project European-African Songbird Migration Network of the Oldenburg University. Thanks to these studies has been discovered the importance of the Bolle di Magadino for migratory birds.

== See also ==
- CoEur devotional path
