= Sancarlone =

Statue of Charles Borromeo near Arona, Italy

Colossus of San Carlo Borromeo
- Sancarlone
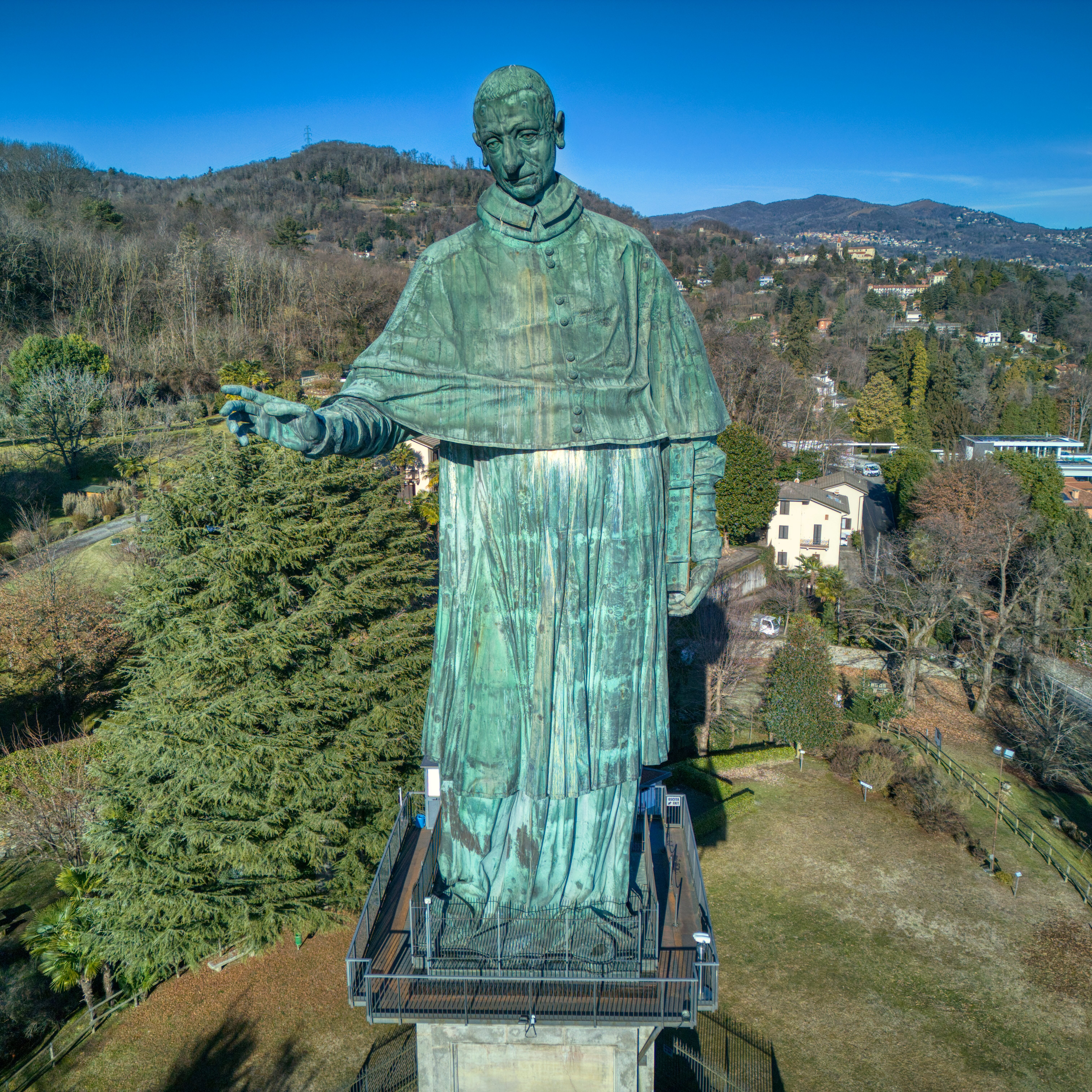
- San Carlone
- Interactive map of Colossus of San Carlo Borromeo
- Location: Arona, Piedmont, Italy
- Coordinates: 45°46′13″N 8°32′36″E
- Designer: Giovan Battista Crespi
- Type: Monument
- Material: Copper plates on iron frame, granite pedestal
- Height: 35 metres (115 ft); Pedestal and base: 11.5 metres (38 ft); Figure: 23.5 metres (77 ft)
- Beginning date: 1614
- Completion date: 1698
- Opening date: 1698
- Dedicated to: Charles Borromeo ("San Carlo")

The San Carlone or Sancarlone or the Colossus of San Carlo Borromeo is a massive copper statue by Giovanni Battista Crespi, erected between 1614 and 1698, near Arona, Italy. It represents Charles Borromeo, a Catholic saint and former archbishop of Milan. According to sculptor Frédéric Auguste Bartholdi "The statue of St. Charles Borromeo is the first known example of a statue of repousse copper, worked with the hammer inside and outside, and freely supported on iron beams". Today, the complex is maintained by Milan's Biblioteca Ambrosiana.

== Background ==
Charles Borromeo, cardinal and archbishop of Milan, was born on 2 October 1538 in the castle of Arona (Rocca di Arona) overlooking Lake Maggiore. He died in Milan on 4 November 1584. The promotion of his cult began almost overnight, and he was canonized by Pope Paul V, just 26 years later, on 1 November 1610.

The chief promoter of the cult of St. Charles was his own cousin, Federico Borromeo (1564-1631), also cardinal and archbishop of Milan. Federico oversaw the Quadroni of St. Charles, two cycles of devotional paintings (The Facts of the Life of Blessed Charles and The Miracles of St. Charles), commissioned in celebration of St. Charles’ beatification in 1602, which still hang in the Milan Cathedral. Federico also supported the construction of San Carlo al Corso in Rome, which was begun in 1610.

However, Federico's pet project was closer to home in Arona. Federico envisioned, perhaps as early as 1598, a Sacro Monte, or Holy Mountain, in memory of St. Charles and surmounted by the world's tallest statue. The original plan foresaw the erection of fifteen chapels, following a pathway from the lake to the statue square, each depicting through sculptures and frescoes an important event in the life of the saint. Federico laid the first stone of the Sacro Monte on 13 July 1614, and a seminary was built between 1620 and 1643. Yet, by 1656, only four of the chapels were finished. The grand scheme of St. Charles’ Sacro Monte was never completed – but the statue itself became a smashing success.

== History of the monument ==
Around 1610 (when Charles Borromeo was canonized), Father Marco Aurelio Grattarola had the idea of building a Sacro Monte devoted to Saint Charles on a hill behind his native town. The work was intended to celebrate the archbishop of Milan in the territory of his family.

The greatness of the figure inspired the idea of a huge statue visible from the opposite side of the Lake Maggiore. The initiative received the support of Federico Borromeo, who succeeded the cousin as archbishop of Milan.

The statue was designed by Giovan Battista Crespi (known as Il Cerano), and erected by Siro Zanella of Pavia and Bernardo Falcone of Lugano. Zanella and Falcone moulded the copper sheets and slightly modified the original project, making the statue larger. It was begun in 1614, soon after St. Charles Borromeo's canonization, and completed in 1698. It was dedicated on 19 May 1698 by the archbishop of Milan, Cardinal Federico Caccia. An adjacent church dedicated to St. Charles was completed between 1725 and 1728.

At 35.10 metres (115.2 ft) including its pedestal, the Colossus of San Carlo Borromeo was for nearly two centuries the tallest statue in the world that could be visited inside; it held that distinction from its completion in 1698 until 1886, when it was surpassed by the Statue of Liberty (and today there are taller enterable bronze or bronze-clad statues, such as the Ushiku Daibutsu in Japan at 120 m).

== Description ==
The Colossus of San Carlo Borromeo is built on a hill overlooking Lago Maggiore near the ancestral castle of the Borromeo family. A series of chapels was planned to document the life of the saint, forming a Sacro Monte for religious meditation and veneration. Only three were eventually built.

The 23.5-metre statue is made in embossed sheets of copper attached with harpoons and iron beams to an inner core of bricks reaching to the statue's neck. «The copper is a little thin, measuring only a millimetre in thickness, and yet the whole work has stood until to-day, that is to say, for two centuries.» The head and hands of the statue are in bronze. It stands on a granite pedestal, 11.5 metres high.

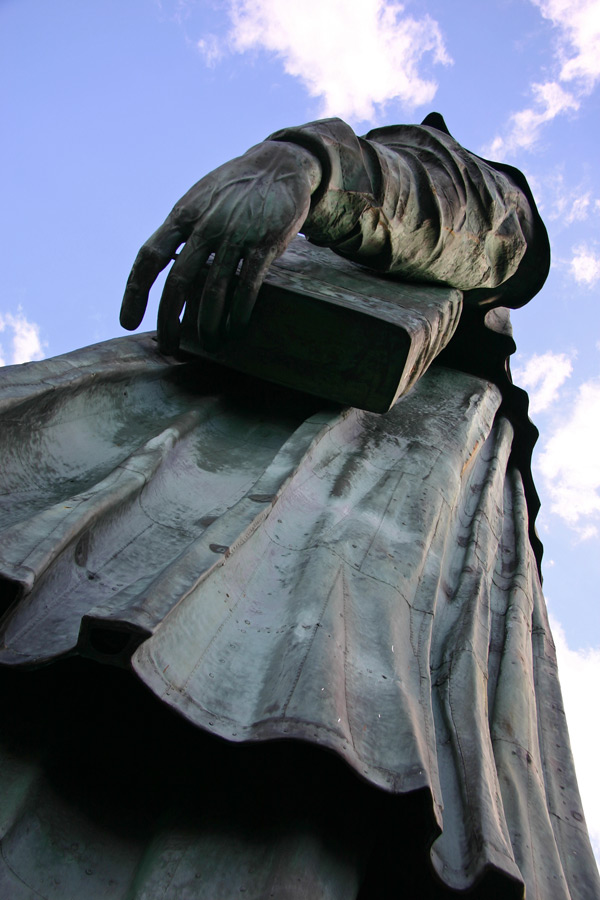
Sancarlone in 2008

Saint Charles is portrayed standing in his cassock, rochet and mozzetta as he blesses the town of Arona with his right hand while holding a book in his left arm. The saint's blessing arm is a complex metal structure, specially constructed to resist the strong winds in this area. Behind the pedestal, two spiral staircases lead to the balcony where a door hidden in the pleats of the Saint's cassock leads to another spiral staircase and steep vertical stairs that come out at the top of the statue. From here it is possible to take in the view through a series of portholes where the eyes, ears and nostrils are, or through some apertures along the back.

Frédéric Auguste Bartholdi, the French artist who designed the Statue of Liberty, visited Arona in 1869 on his way back from Egypt to study the statue's structure. The colossus of Arona is mentioned on the plaque placed at the feet of the Statue of Liberty.

== Trivia ==
In the film Spider-Man: Far From Home, The Torch Lady from the Columbia Pictures logo fades into a statue of Sancarlone.

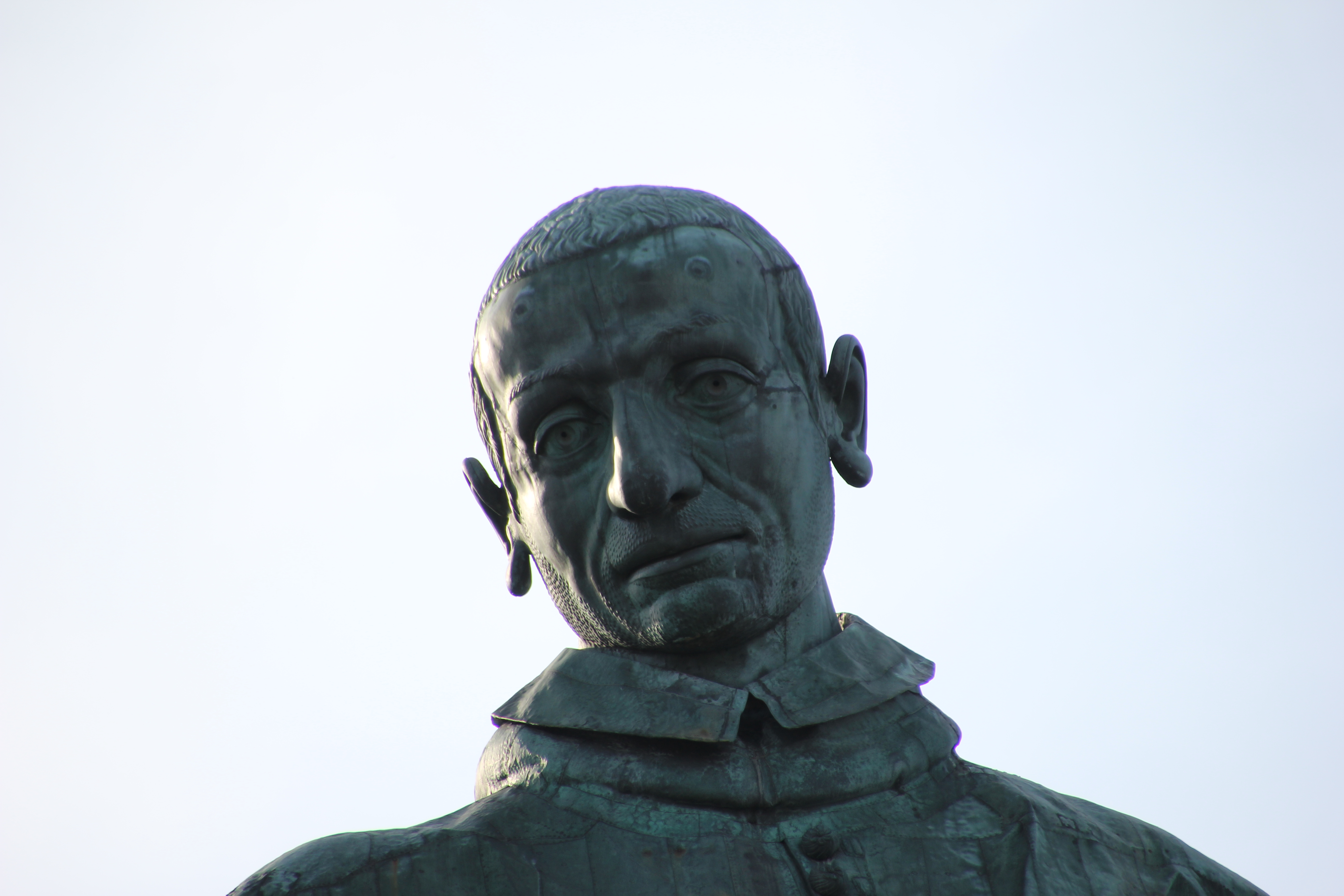
Detail of the head

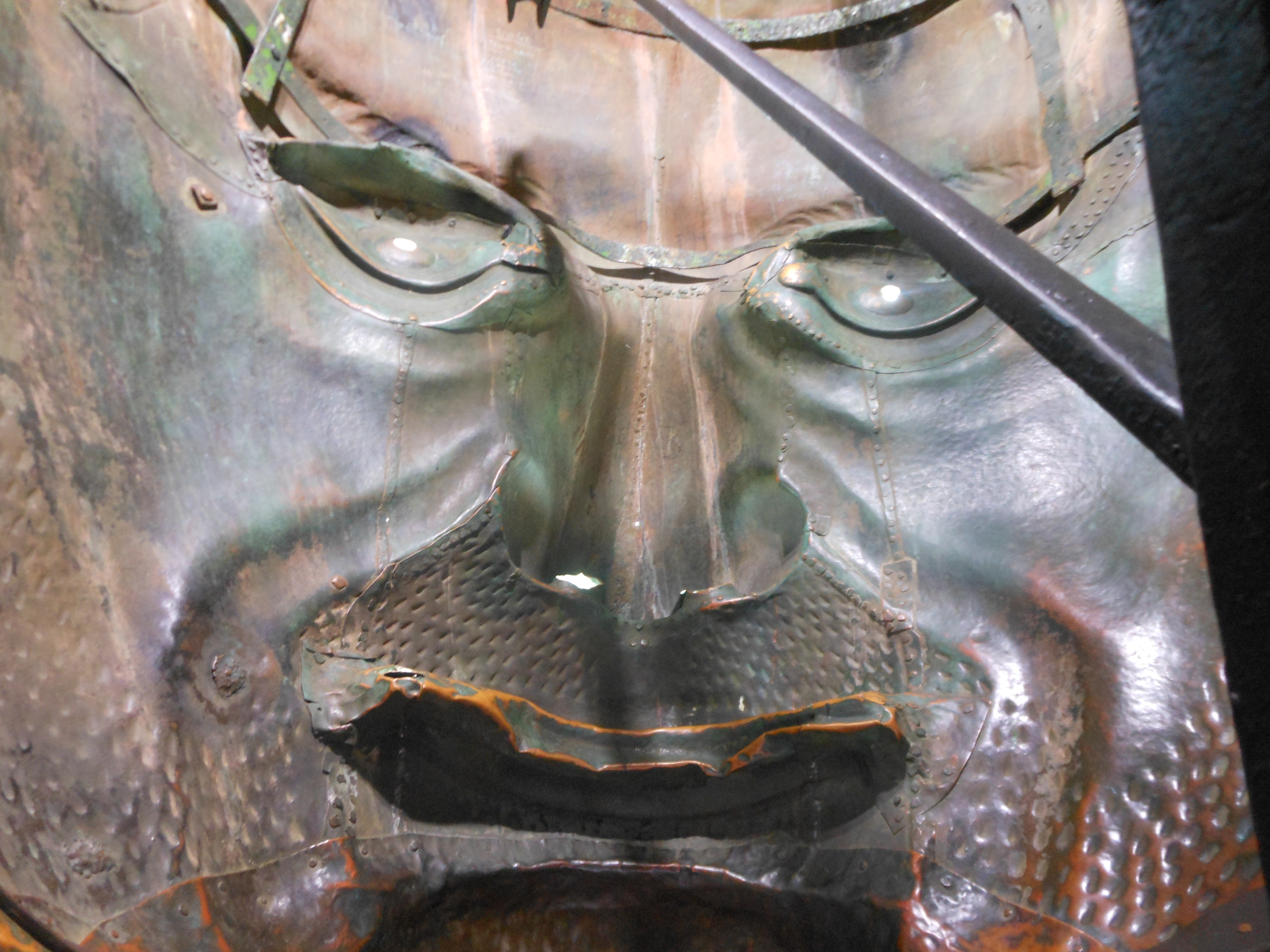
Detail of the face from the inside

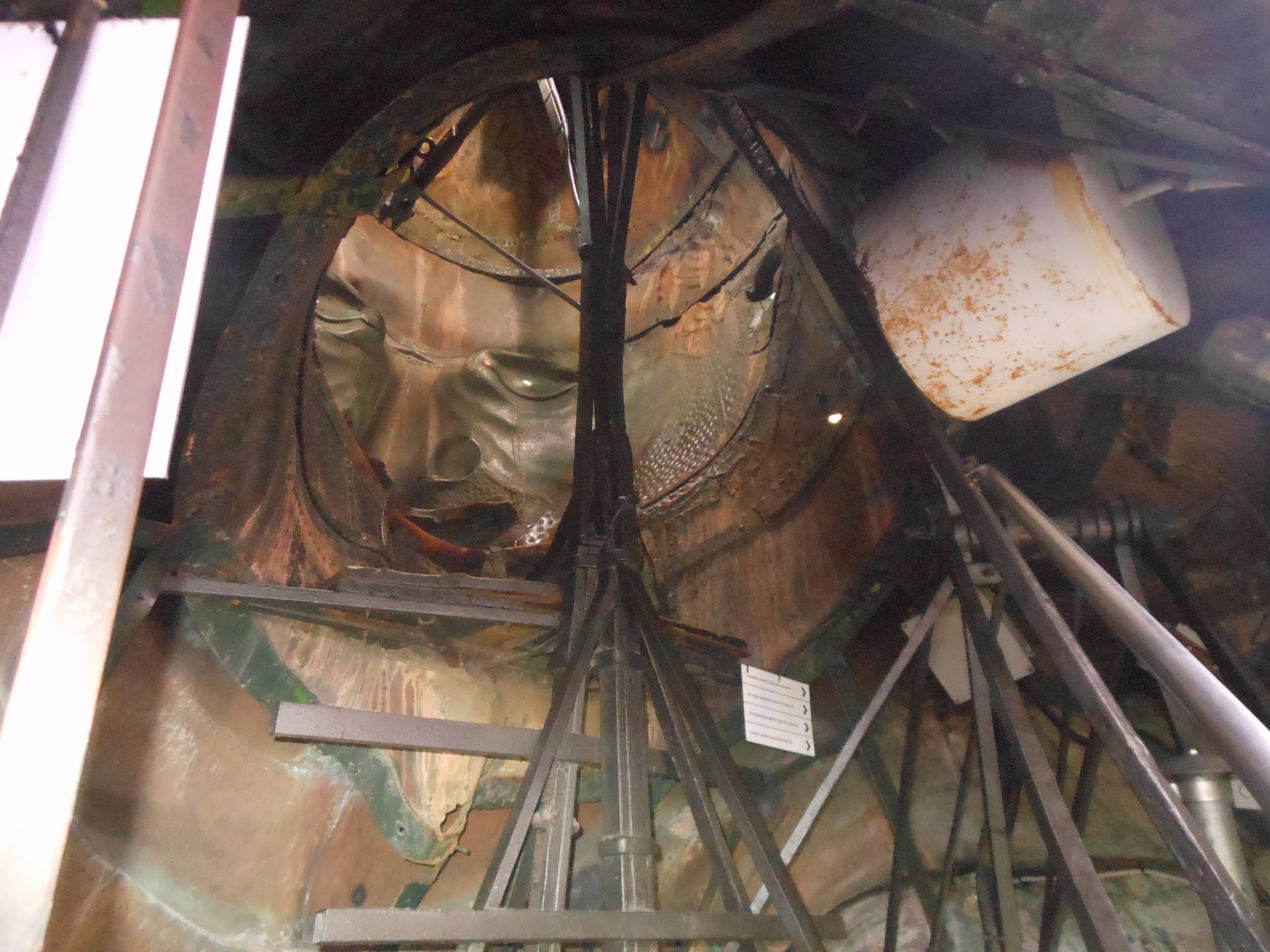
Inside the Colossus

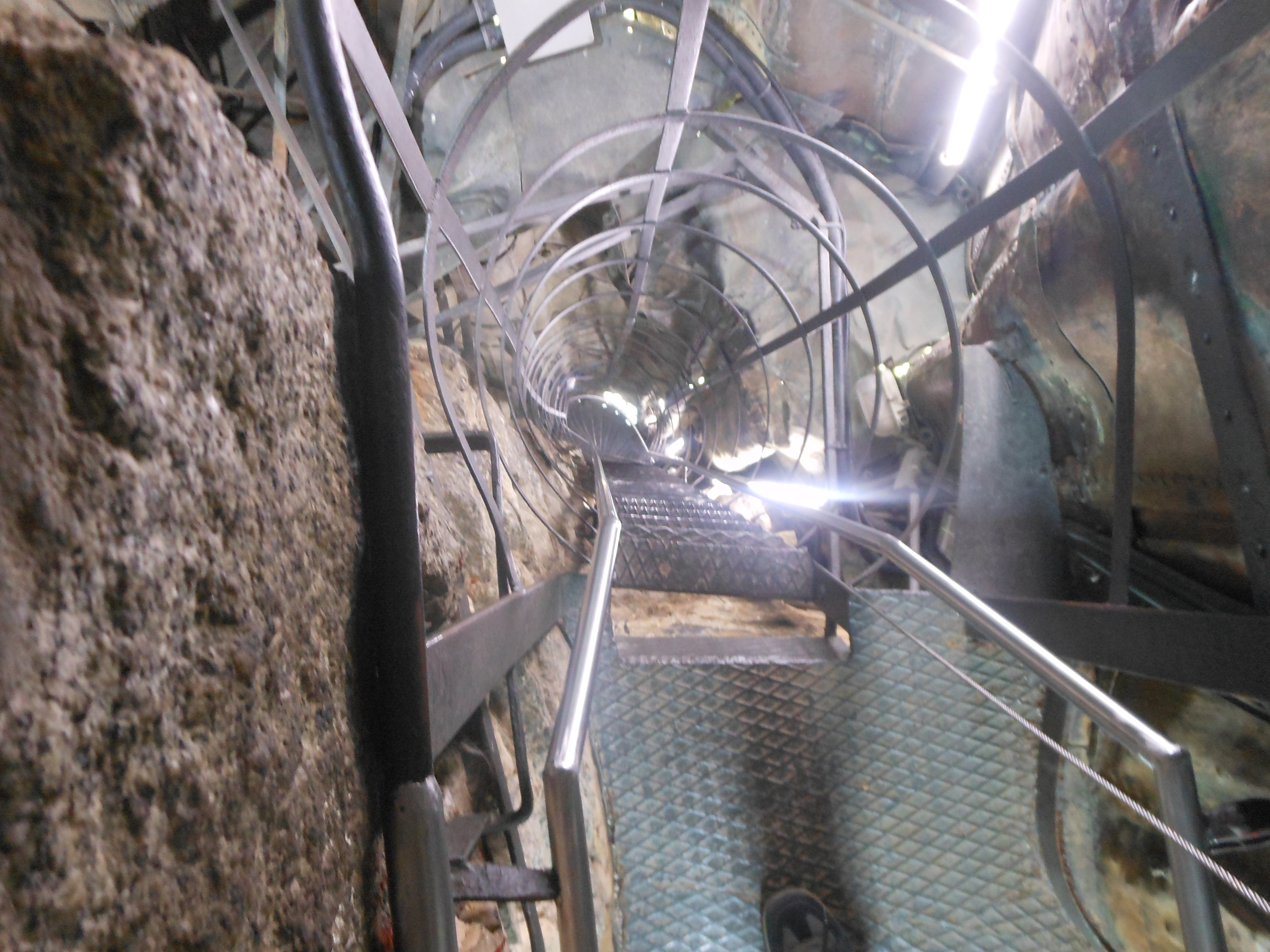
Interior view of the Colossus

== See also ==
- Hermannsdenkmal (Detmold, Germany)
- List of tallest statues
- Vercingétorix monument (France)

== Sources ==
- Official website
- Arona comune website
- Article on Bartholdi's visit to Arona
