= Monte Fenera Natural Park =

Coordinates: 45.7100°N 8.3160°E

Parco naturale del Monte Fenera
- IUCN category V (protected landscape/seascape)
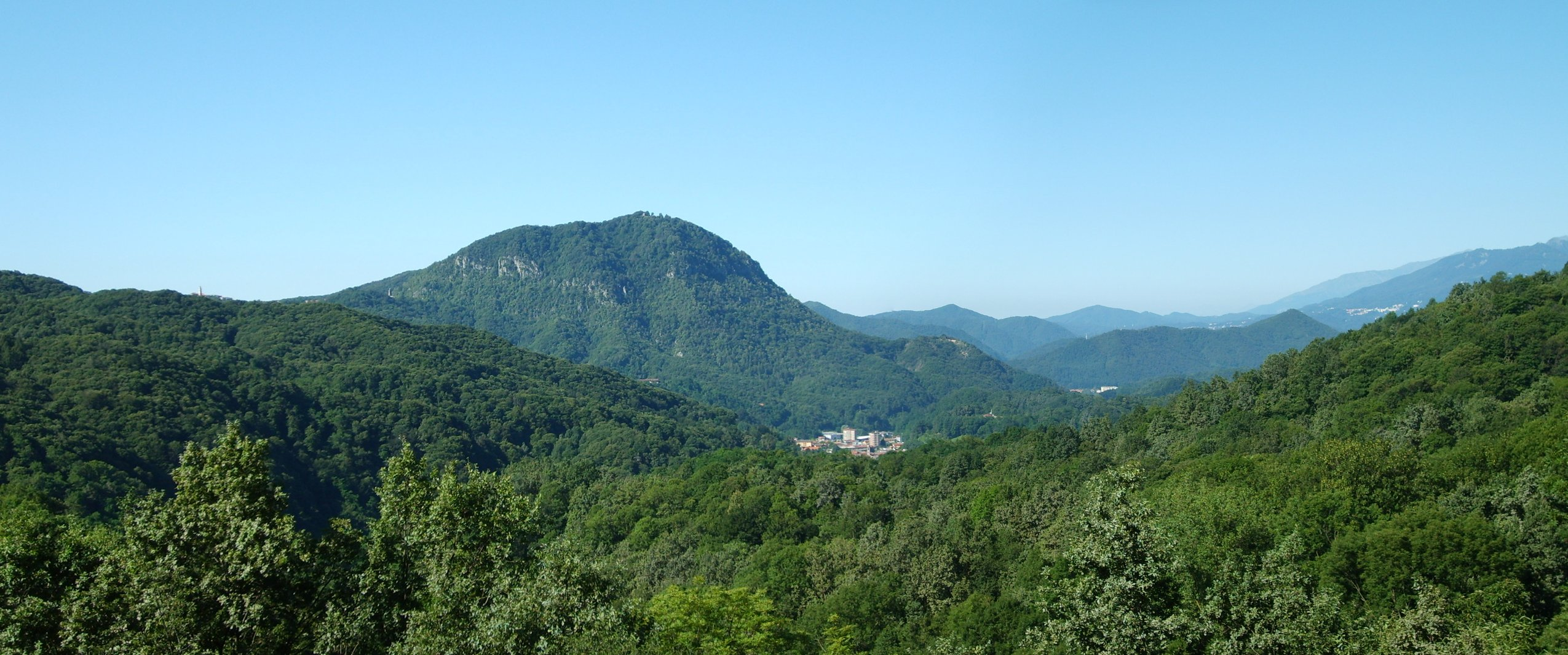
- Location: Piedmont
- Nearest city: Borgosesia
- Area: 3378 hectares
- Established: 1987
- Governing body: Ente di gestione del Parco naturale del Monte Fenera

The Monte Fenera Nature Park is a nature reserve of 725.98 hectares on the hills of the Valsesia around the Monte Fenera at an altitude of 899 m.

In the karst caves remains of Neanderthal, Mousterian (Paleolithic) and cave bear were found.

== See also ==
- CoEur - In the heart of European paths
