= Arona, Piedmont =

Arona Aruna (Lombard)
- Comune
- Città di Arona
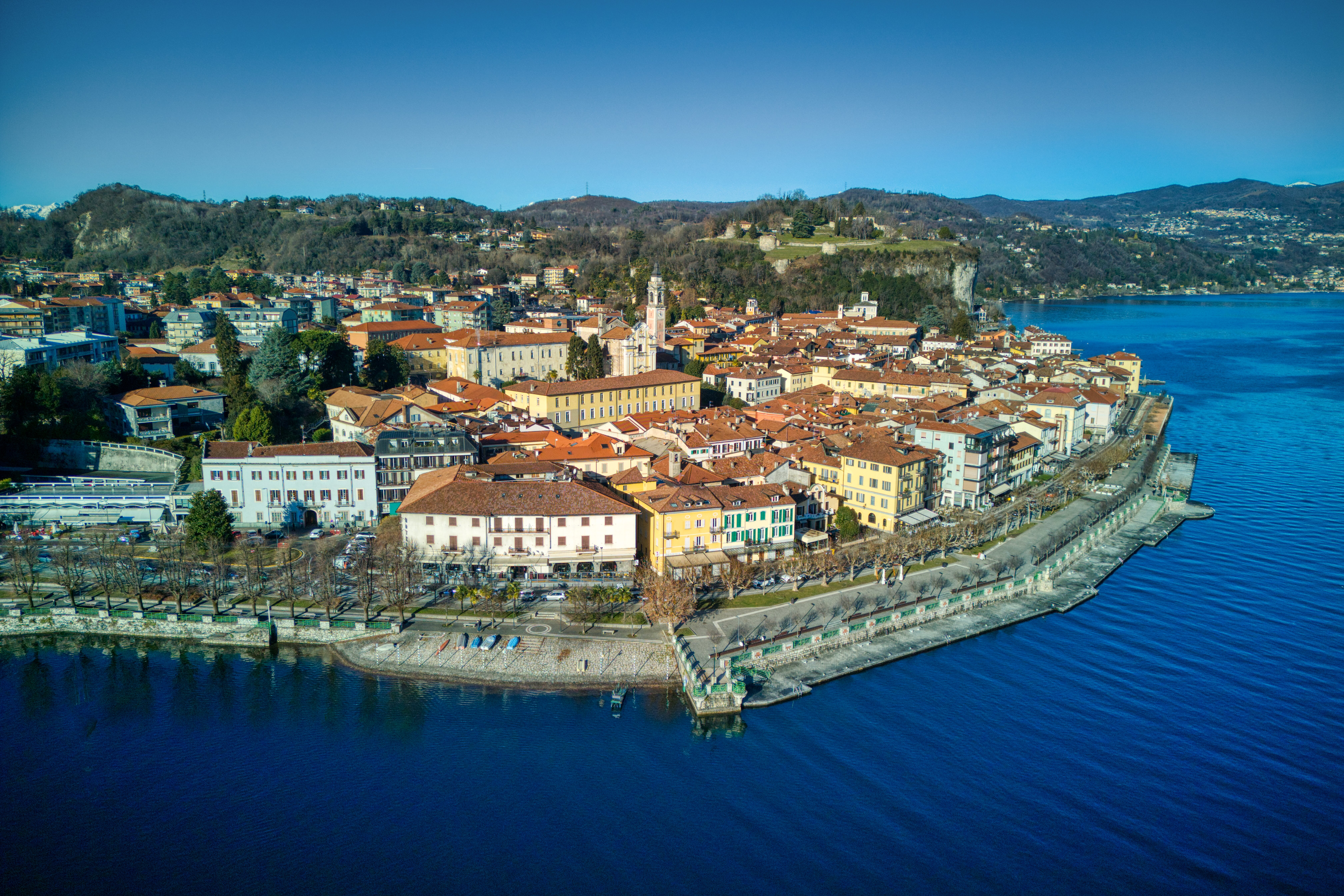
- View of Arona

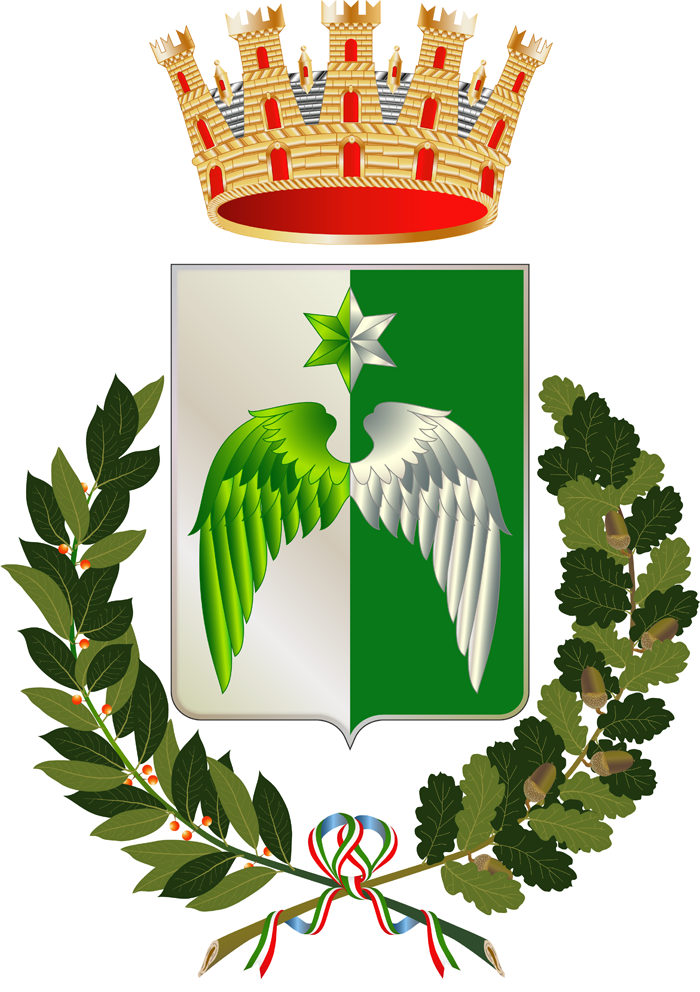
- Coat of arms

- Location within Italy Location within Piedmont
- Coordinates: 45°45′N 08°33′E
- Country: Italy
- Region: Piedmont
- Province: Novara (NO)
- Frazioni: Campagna, Dagnente, Mercurago, Montrigiasco

Government
  - Mayor: Alberto Gusmeroli (since 10 June 2024) (LN)

Area
  - Total: 14.90 km^{2} (5.75 sq mi)
- Elevation: 212 m (696 ft)

Population (31 December 2010)
  - Total: 14,547
  - Density: 976.3/km^{2} (2,529/sq mi)
- Demonym: Aronesi
- Time zone: UTC+1 (CET)
  - Summer (DST): UTC+2 (CEST)
- Postal code: 28041
- Dialing code: 0322
- Patron saint: Sts. Felinus and Gratian
- Saint day: March 13
- Website: Official website

Arona (Italian pronunciation: [aˈroːna]; Piedmontese: Aron-a [aˈrʊŋa]; Western Lombard: Aruna [aˈruna]) is a town and comune on Lake Maggiore, in the province of Novara (northern Italy). Its main economic activity is tourism, especially from Milan, France and Germany.

== History ==
Archaeological findings have shown that the area of what today is Arona was settled from the 18th–13th centuries BC. Prehistoric pile-dwellings have been found near the town and are part of the Prehistoric Pile dwellings around the Alps UNESCO World Heritage Site. Later, it was a possession of the Celts, the Romans and the Lombards.

In the era of the Roman Empire, Arona became an essential waypoint of the Simplon route, used by the Roman army for the conquest of the Gaul region. This historical importance is reflected in the artefacts discovered from a Roman necropolis, including urns, terracotta pots, and coins, which are currently exhibited in the city museum in Piazza San Graziano.

In the 11th century, the Benedictine abbey of Saints Gratianus and Felinus, Martyrs, was founded.

After the siege and destruction of Milan in 1162 by Emperor Frederick Barbarossa, many of the exiled took refuge in Arona.

Later, the town was a possession of the Torriani and (from 1277) of the Visconti families. Under the Visconti family, Arona was transformed into a fortified stronghold. They also granted the territory to the wealthy Borromeo family, who were affluent bankers. This small village was given a castle and a well-defended harbour. In the early 14th century, the town became a free commune under the suzerainty of the abbey. In 1439, it was acquired by Vitaliano Borromeo and, as a result, by the House of Borromeo. In 1538, Carlo Borromeo was born in the Castle on the Rock of Arona, becoming one of the town's most significant figures.

It was in Arona that the twenty-year-old Oscar Wilde wrote his poem "Rome Unvisited" in 1875, travelling with his former Trinity College Dublin Classics Tutor, J.P. Mahaffy, lamenting that he had to leave Italy before having a chance to visit Rome.

== Geography ==
The city of Arona is located on the Piedmontese shore of Lake Maggiore and is crossed by the Vevera stream, which flows into the lake. Around there are the hilly bas-reliefs of morainic origin incorporated into the Lagoni di Mercurago Natural Park where, in 1860, the first pile-dwelling settlement found in Italy was identified. The hills are generally covered by woods that occupy more than half of the territory. 33% of the surface is occupied by urbanized areas, 9% by meadows or pastures; smaller percentages are allocated to parks, gardens and green sports areas (2.3%), vegetable gardens, orchards, nurseries and vineyards (1.7%), uncultivated herbaceous (1%) and arable land (0.4%).

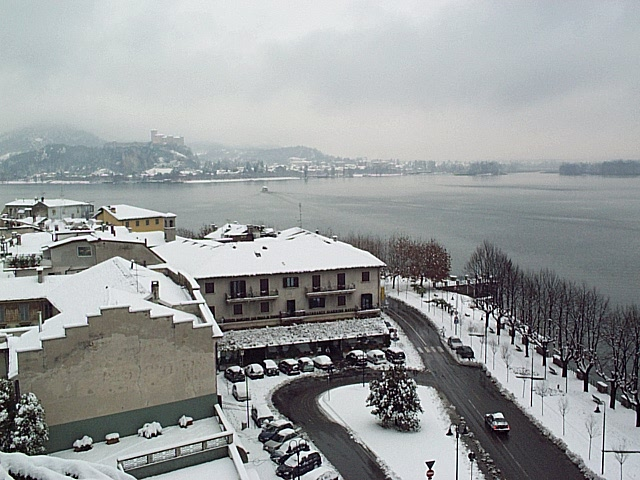
Largo Garibaldi in winter. The castle in the background is in Angera

== Main sights ==
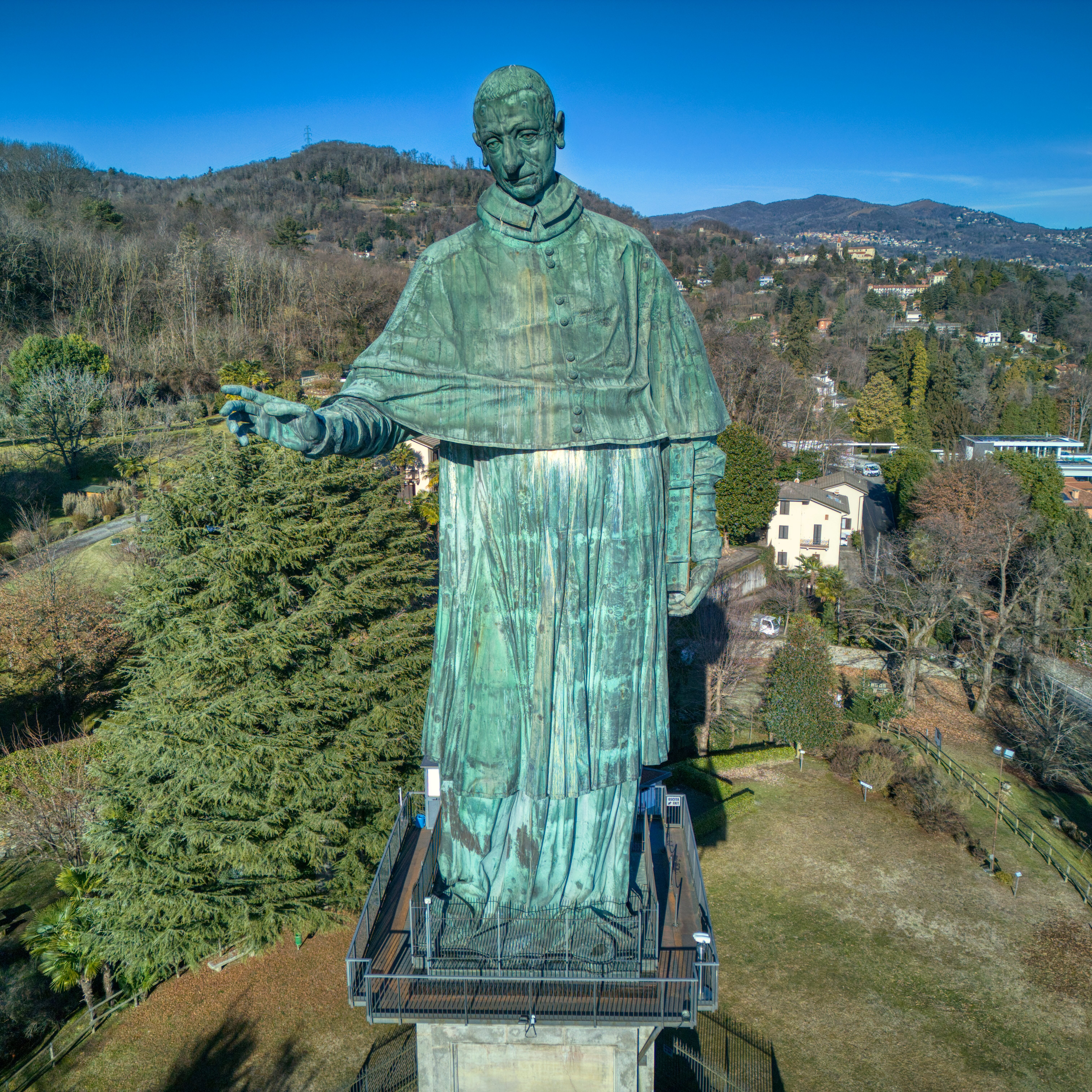
The famous Sancarlone, a giant statue of St. Charles Borromeo

Arona's main attractions include:

- Sancarlone. This giant statue of Saint Charles Borromeo was commissioned by Cardinal Federico Borromeo, and construction began in 1614 and was completed in 1698. At 35.10 metres (115.2 ft), it was the largest bronze standing statue in the world, still second only to the Statue of Liberty. It is said that the architects behind the Statue of Liberty consulted the blueprints of the Sancarlone when laying out their own. The statue was intended as part of a complex of buildings and chapels celebrating the life of St. Charles, of which only three chapels were completed. Next to the statue are the 17th-century basilica and the former Archbishop's Palace. A smaller version of the statue, the Sancarlino, can be seen in Corso Cavour in the town.
- La Rocca ("The Castle") is a park owned by the Borromeo family. The park used to contain the castle of Arona, destroyed by the Napoleonic armies, and was the birthplace of St. Charles Borromeo himself. The park is freely open to the public and is a favourite of many locals; many animals are kept in semi-captivity in various areas of the park.

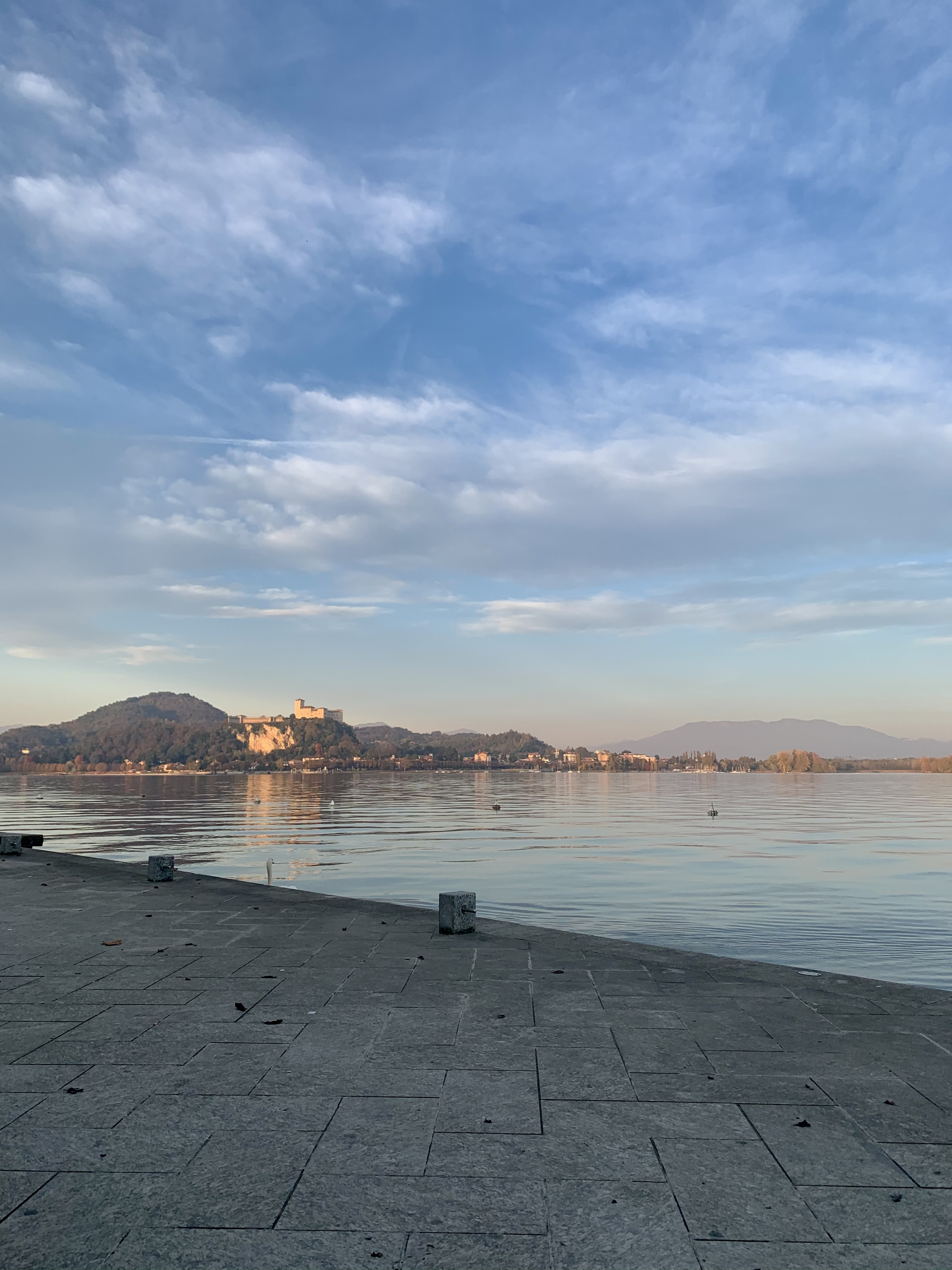
Lakeside of Arona looking on Rocca Borromeo di Angera

- The Lungolago ("Lakeside") offers a view of the castle on the opposite shore, the Rocca Borromeo di Angera, the lake and the Alps. Swimming in Lake Maggiore is now possible after years of pollution. A beach has been refurbished by this group close to Piazza del Popolo in the town centre, called Le rocchette ("The little rocks").
- Collegiata della Natività di Maria Vergine (1482) - the church has paintings of the life of the Virgin Mary by Pier Francesco Mazzucchelli, also known as Morazzone, and a Holy Family by Gaudenzio Ferrari.
- Santi Martiri
- Sacro Monte di Arona

The frazione of Mercurago is home to Lagoni Park, a protected area including a peat bog, pastures dedicated to the breeding of thoroughbred horses and a woodland area. There are also some archaeological findings from the Bronze Age, including ancient wheels.

== Transport ==
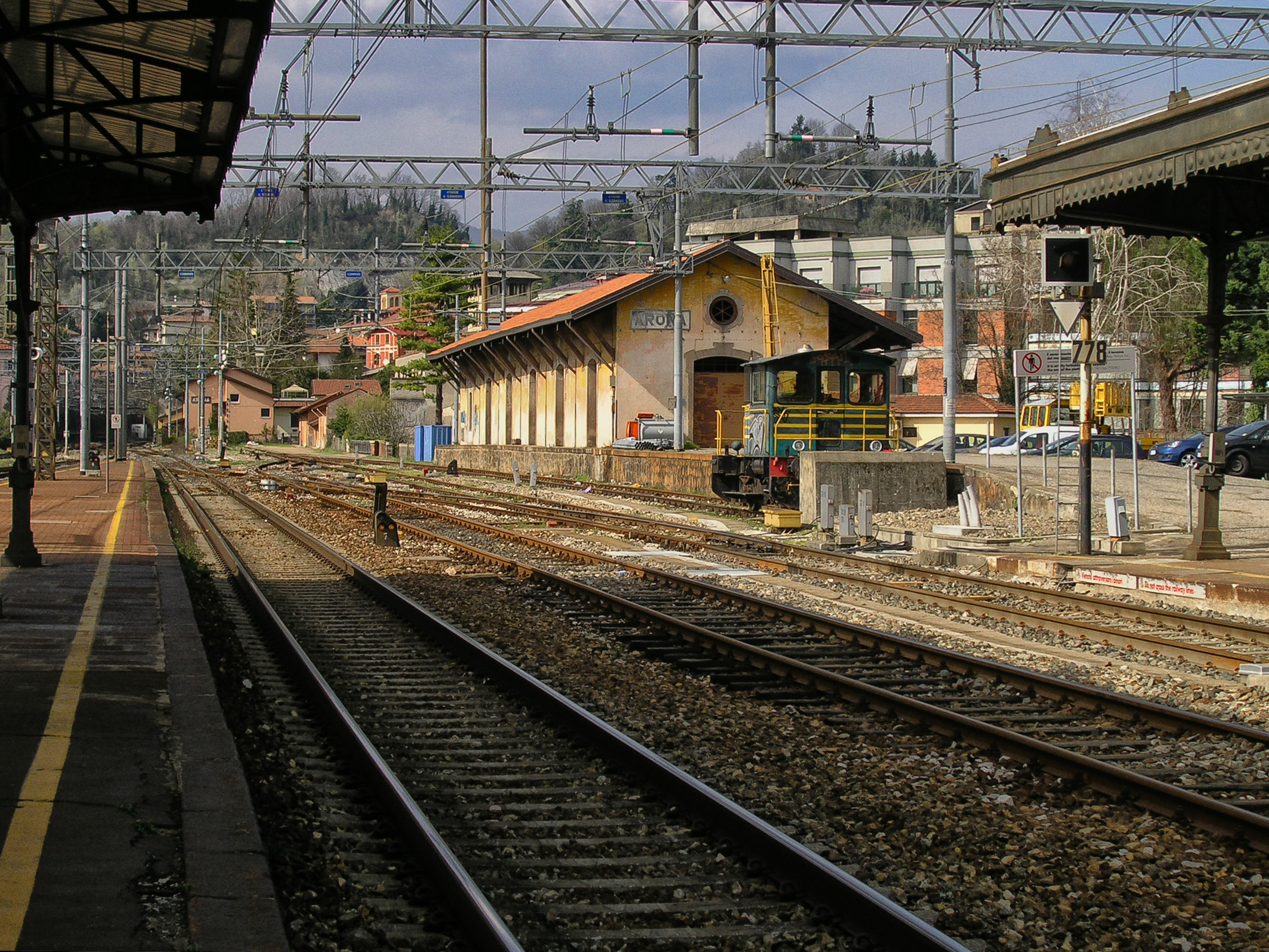
Train station

Arona is 25 kilometres (16 miles) north of Milan's Malpensa International Airport, actually closer than Milan itself. It is also connected to the railway network, being one of the main stops on the important link between Milan and Switzerland that passes Domodossola (another parallel link travels through Como). Arona is also the last station for two minor rail lines, connecting Arona to Novara and to Santhià; the latter uses single-car diesel trains.

Due to the town's size, there is no public transport, but some bus companies connect the town to its frazioni of Dagnente, Campagna, Mercurago and Montrigiasco, and to neighbouring municipalities.

Arona is near a confluence of motorways, and from there, one can head for Milan, Genoa, and Gravellona Toce (where the motorway becomes a simple highway to Domodossola and continues into Switzerland). Whereas there is a motorway exit named after Arona, the exit at Castelletto Ticino is usually more convenient for the traveller coming from the direction of Milan.

The headquarters of Navigazione Lago Maggiore (Lake Maggiore's ferry company) is located in Arona, along with its shipyard. Arona is the southernmost port on Lake Maggiore, and transport by boat or hydrofoil is available to both sides of the lake up to the Swiss city of Locarno.

== Surrounding municipalities ==
- Oleggio Castello
- Meina
- Comignago
- Dormelletto

== Twin towns – sister cities ==
Arona is twinned with:

- Compiègne, France
- Arona, Spain
- Huy, Belgium
