= Charles Borromeo =

Catholic prelate and saint (1538–1584)

Saint Charles Borromeo
- Cardinal, Archbishop of Milan
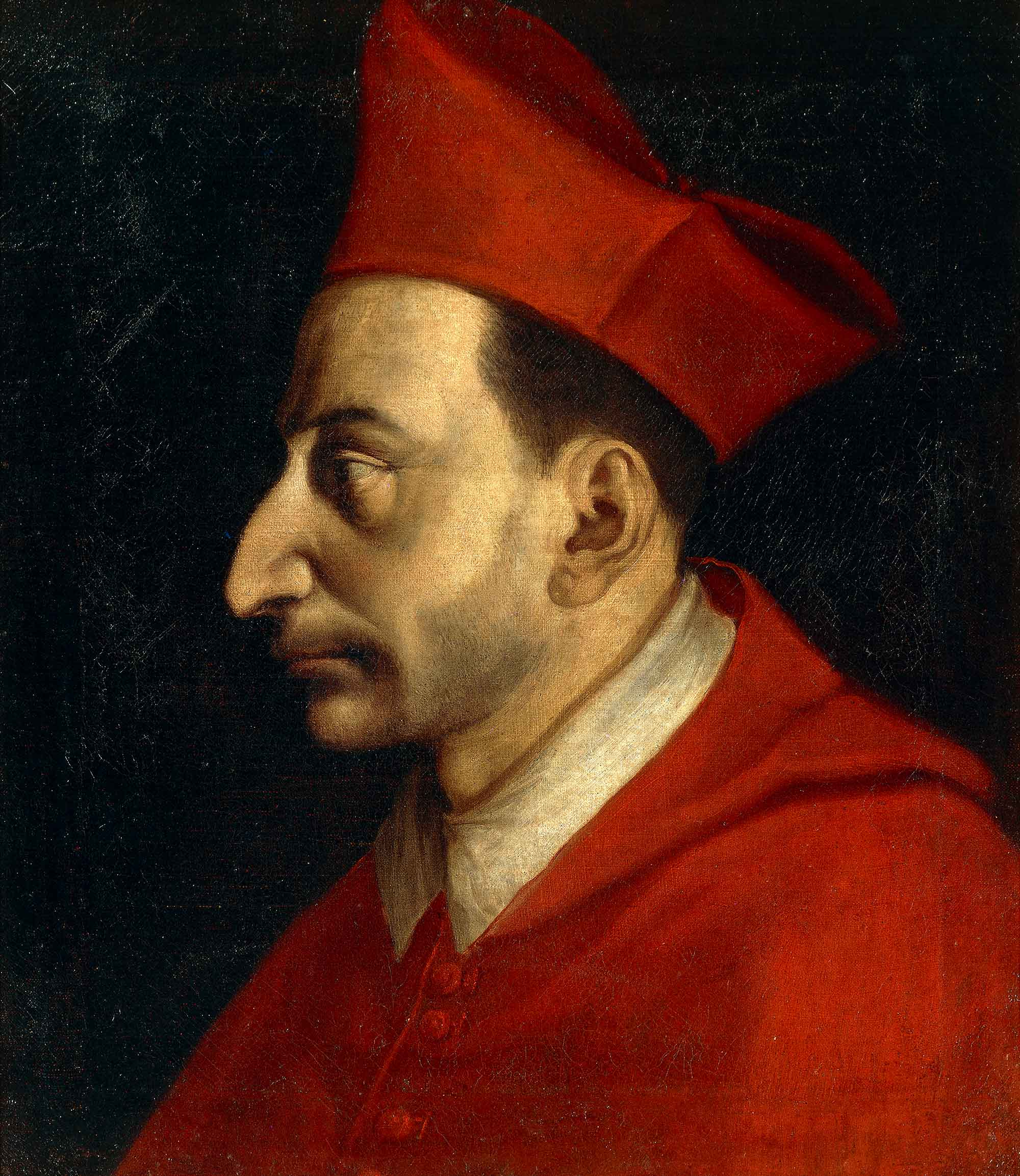
- Portrait by Giovanni Ambrogio Figino
- Church: Catholic
- Archdiocese: Milan
- Province: Milan
- Appointed: 12 May 1564
- Term ended: 3 November 1584
- Predecessor: Filippo Archinto
- Successor: Gaspare Visconti
- Other post: Cardinal-Priest of Santa Prassede

Orders
- Ordination: 4 September 1563 by Federico Cesi
- Consecration: 7 December 1563 by Giovanni Serbelloni
- Created cardinal: 31 January 1560 by Pius IV
- Rank: Cardinal priest

Personal details
- Born: Count Carlo Borromeo di Arona; 2 October 1538 Castle of Arona, Duchy of Milan
- Died: 3 November 1584 (aged 46) Milan, Duchy of Milan
- Buried: Milan Cathedral
- Parents: Gilbert Borromeo; Margaret d'Medici

Sainthood
- Feast day: 4 November
- Venerated in: Catholic Church
- Title as Saint: Bishop, Confessor
- Beatified: 12 May 1602; Rome, Papal States by Clement VIII
- Canonized: 1 November 1610; Rome, Papal States by Paul V
- Attributes: cord, red cardinal robes
- Patronage: against ulcers, apple orchards, bishops, catechists, catechumens, colic, intestinal disorder, Lombardy, Italy, Monterey California, cardinals, seminarians, spiritual directors, spiritual leaders, starch makers, stomach diseases, São Carlos city in Brazil (namesake)
- Shrines: Milan Cathedral; San Carlo al Corso, Rome

Charles Borromeo (Italian: Carlo Borromeo; Latin: Carolus Borromeus; 2 October 1538 – 3 November 1584) was an Italian Catholic prelate who served as Archbishop of Milan from 1564 to 1584. He was made a cardinal in 1560.

Borromeo founded the Confraternity of Christian Doctrine and was a leading figure of the Counter-Reformation together with Ignatius of Loyola and Philip Neri. In that role, he was responsible for significant reforms in the Catholic Church, including the founding of seminaries for the education of priests. He was canonized in 1610 and his feast day is 4 November.

== Early life ==
Charles was the fourth child, descended from the banker Giovanni Borromeo. Borromeo was a descendant of nobility; the Borromeo family was one of the most ancient and wealthiest in Lombardy, made famous by several notable men, both in the church and state. The family coat of arms included the Borromean rings, which are sometimes taken to symbolize the Holy Trinity. Borromeo's father, Gilbert, was Count of Arona. His mother, Margaret, was a member of the Milanese branch of the House of Medici. The second son in a family of six children, he was born in the castle of Arona on Lake Maggiore 36 miles from Milan on 2 October 1538.

Borromeo received the tonsure when he was about twelve years old. At this time, his paternal uncle Giulio Cesare Borromeo turned over to him the income from the rich Benedictine abbey of Sts. Gratinian and Felin, one of the ancient perquisites of the family. Borromeo made plain to his father that all revenues from the abbey beyond what was required to prepare him for a career in the church belonged to the poor and could not be applied to secular use. The young man attended the University of Pavia, where he applied himself to the study of civil and canon law. Due to a slight speech impediment, he was regarded as slow, but his thoroughness and industry meant that he made rapid progress. In 1554, his father died, and although he had an elder brother, Count Federico, he was requested by the family to take the management of their domestic affairs. After a time, he resumed his studies, and on 6 December 1559, he earned a doctorate in canon and civil law.

== Period in Rome ==
On 25 December 1559, Borromeo's uncle Cardinal Giovanni Angelo Medici was elected as Pope Pius IV. The newly elected pope required his nephew to come to Rome, and on 13 January 1560 appointed him protonotary apostolic. Shortly thereafter, on 31 January 1560, the pope created him cardinal, and thus Borromeo as cardinal-nephew was entrusted with both the public and the privy seal of the ecclesiastical state. He was also brought into the government of the Papal States and appointed a supervisor of the Franciscans, Carmelites and Knights of Malta.

During his four years in Rome, Borromeo lived in austerity, obliged the Roman Curia to wear black, and established an academy of learned persons, the Academy of the Vatican Knights, publishing their memoirs as the Noctes Vaticanae.

Borromeo organized the third and last session of the Council of Trent, in 1562–63. He had a large share in the making of the Tridentine Catechism (Catechismus Romanus). In 1561, Borromeo founded and endowed a college at Pavia, today known as Almo Collegio Borromeo which he dedicated to Justina of Padua.

On 19 November 1562, his older brother, Federico, suddenly died. His family urged Borromeo to seek permission to return to the lay state (laicization), to marry and have children so that the family name would not become extinct, but he decided not to leave the ecclesiastic state. His brother's death, along with his contacts with the Jesuits and the Theatines and the example of bishops such as Bartholomew of Braga, were the causes of the conversion of Borromeo towards a more strict and operative Christian life, and his aim became to put into practice the dignity and duties of the bishop as drafted by the recent Council of Trent.

== Archbishop of Milan ==
Borromeo was appointed the administrator of the Archdiocese of Milan on 7 February 1560. To this end, he was ordained a deacon on 21 December of that same year. After his decision to stay in the service of the Church, he was ordained a priest (4 September 1563) and on 7 December 1563 he was consecrated as a bishop in the Sistine Chapel by Cardinal Giovanni Serbelloni. Borromeo was formally appointed archbishop of Milan on 12 May 1564 at the age of 25, after the former archbishop Ippolito II d'Este waived his claims on that archbishopric, but he was only allowed by the pope to leave Rome one year later. Borromeo made his formal entry into Milan as archbishop on 23 September 1565.

=== Reform in Milan ===
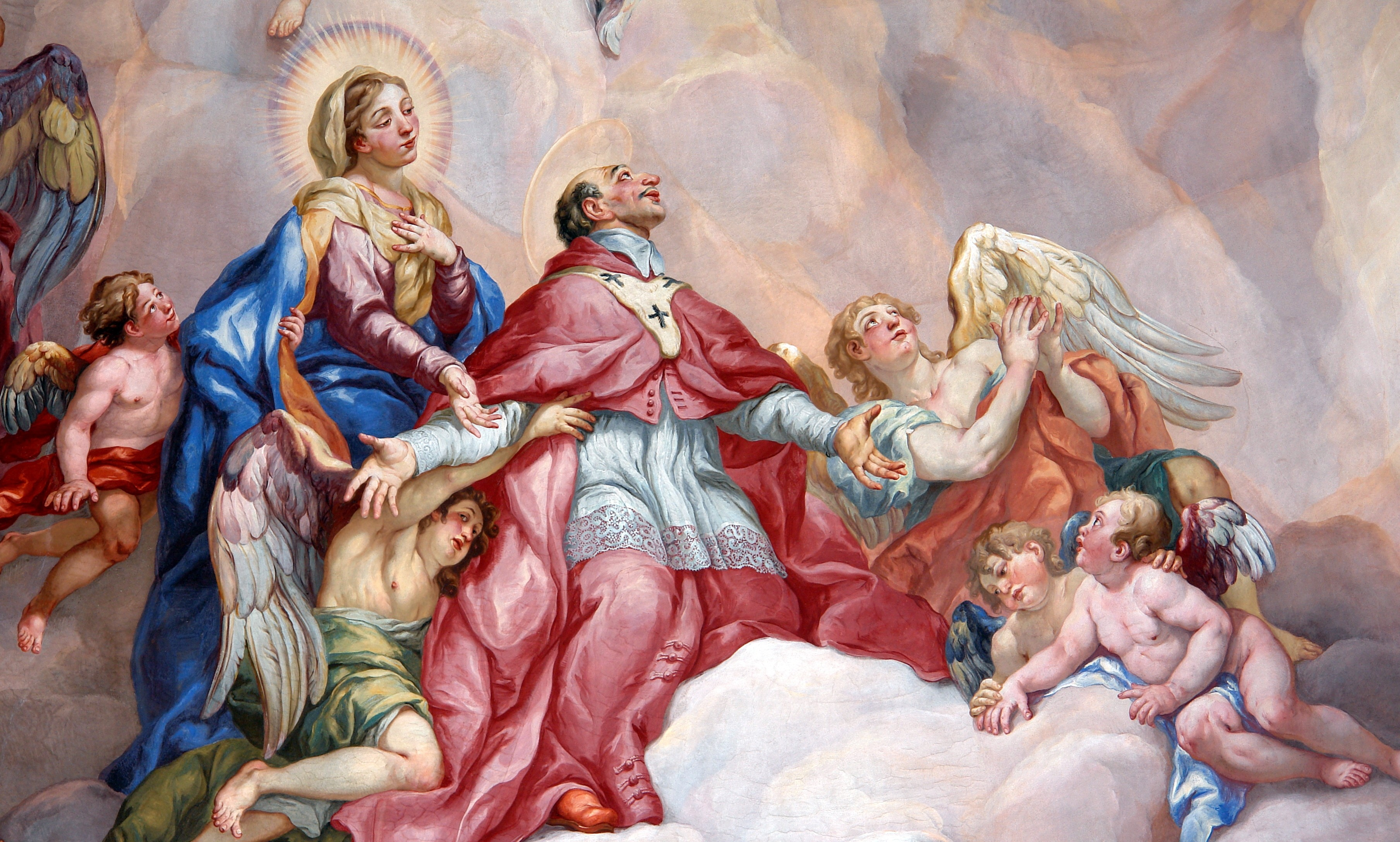
Intercession of Charles Borromeo supported by the Virgin Mary by Rottmayr (Karlskirche, Vienna)

After the death of his uncle, Pius IV (1566), Borromeo sent a galley to fetch Cardinal Ugo Boncompagni, the Nuncio in Spain, but he did not arrive in time to be considered at the conclave. Borromeo then reached an agreement with Alessandro Farnese, who held a significant number of votes, to support Antonio Ghislieri, who was rumoured to have the support of Philip II of Spain. Ghislieri was elected and took the name Pius V.

Before Borromeo went to Milan, while he was overseeing reform in Rome, a nobleman remarked that the latter city was no longer a place to enjoy oneself or to make a fortune. "Carlo Borromeo has undertaken to remake the city from top to bottom," he said, predicting that the reformer's enthusiasm "would lead him to correct the rest of the world once he has finished with Rome."

Subsequently, he devoted himself to the reformation of his diocese which had deteriorated in practice owing to the 80-year absence of previous archbishops. Milan was the largest archdiocese in Italy at the time, with more than 3,000 clergy and 800,000 people. Both its clergy and laity had drifted from church teaching. The selling of indulgences and ecclesiastical positions was prevalent; monasteries were "full of disorder"; many religious were "lazy, ignorant, and debauched".

Borromeo made numerous pastoral visits and restored dignity to divine service. He urged churches to be designed in conformity with the decrees of the Council of Trent, which stated that sacred art and architecture lacking adequate scriptural foundation was in effect prohibited, as was any inclusion of classical pagan elements in religious art. He divided the nave of the church into two compartments to separate the sexes at worship. He extended his reforms to the collegiate churches, monasteries and even to the Confraternities of Penitents, particularly that of St. John the Baptist. This group was to attend to prisoners and those condemned to death, to give them help and support.

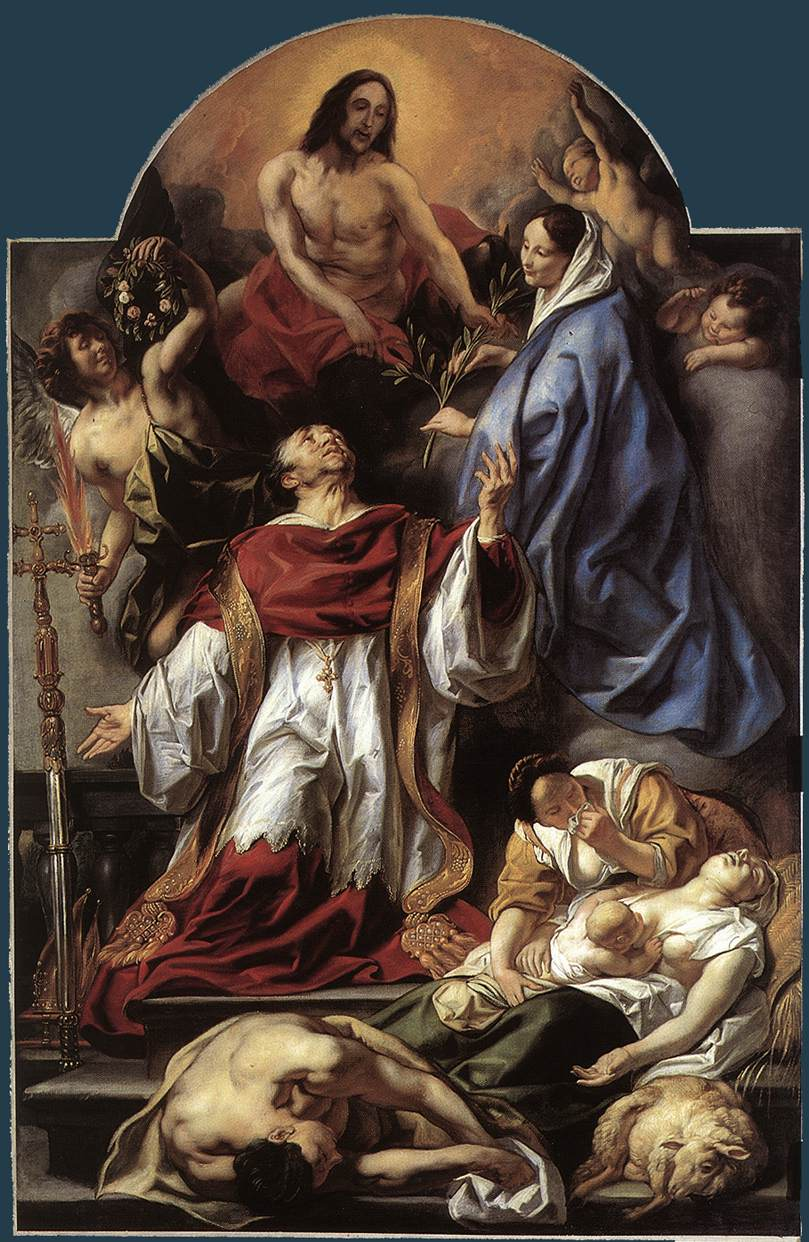
Charles Borromeo intercedes during the plague; painting by Jacob Jordaens (1655)

Borromeo believed that abuses in the church arose from ignorant clergy. Among his most important actions, he established seminaries, colleges, and communities for the education of candidates for holy orders. His emphasis on Catholic learning greatly increased the preparation of men for the priesthood and benefited their congregations. In addition, he founded the fraternity of Oblates of St. Ambrose, a society of secular men who did not take orders but devoted themselves to the church and followed a discipline of monastic prayers and study. They provided assistance to parishes when so directed. The new archbishop's efforts for catechesis and the instruction of youth included the initiation of the first "Sunday School" classes and the work of the Confraternity for Christian Doctrine.

Borromeo's diocesan reforms faced opposition from several religious orders, particularly that of the Humiliati (Brothers of Humility), a penitential order which, although reduced to about 170 members, owned some ninety monasteries. Some members of that society formed a conspiracy against his life, and a shot was fired at him with an arquebus in the archepiscopal chapel. His survival was considered miraculous.

In 1576, there was famine at Milan due to crop failures, and later an outbreak of the plague. The city's trade fell off, and along with it, the people's source of income. The Governor and many members of the nobility fled the city, but the bishop remained to organize the care of those affected and to minister to the dying. He called together the superiors of all the religious communities in the diocese and won their cooperation. Borromeo tried to feed 60,000 to 70,000 people daily. He used up his own funds and went into debt to provide food for the hungry. Finally, he wrote to the Governor and successfully persuaded him to return.

=== Influence on English affairs ===
Borromeo had also been involved in English affairs when he assisted Pius IV. Many English Catholics had fled to Italy at this time because of the persecutions under Queen Elizabeth I. He gave pastoral attention to English Catholics who fled to Italy to escape the new laws against the Catholic faith. Edmund Campion, a Jesuit, and Ralph Sherwin visited him at Milan in 1580 on their way to England. They stayed with him for eight days, talking with him every night after dinner. A Welshman, Grudfydd Robert, served as his canon theologian and an Englishman, Thomas Goldwell, as vicar-general. The archbishop carried on his person a small picture of John Fisher, who with Thomas More had been executed during the reign of Henry VIII and for whom he held a great veneration. During the 19th century Catholic restoration in England, Nicholas Wiseman was to institute an order of Oblates of St Charles, led by Henry Edward Manning, as a congregation of secular priests directly supporting the Archbishop of Westminster.

=== Persecution of religious dissidents ===
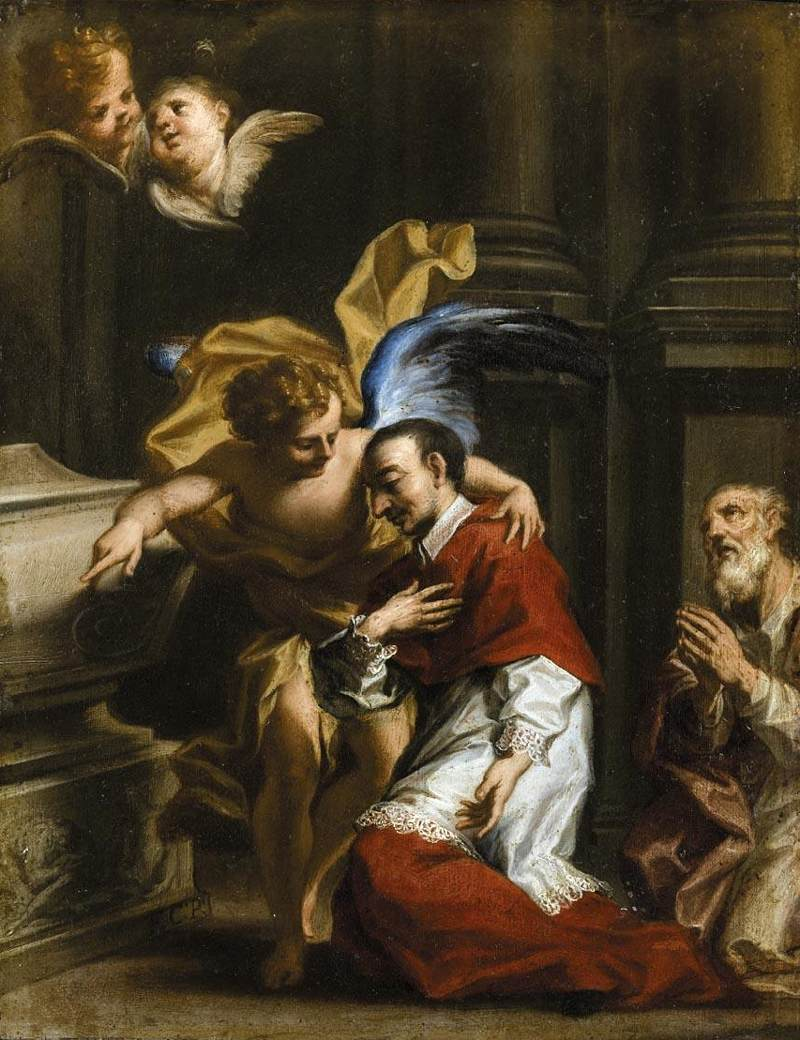
Painting by Francesco Caccianiga showing an angel tending to Charles Borromeo

Though the Diet of Ilanz of 1524 and 1526 had proclaimed freedom of worship in the Three Leagues, Borromeo repressed Protestantism in the Swiss valleys. The Catholic Encyclopedia relates: "In November [1583] he began a visitation as Apostolic visitor of all the cantons of Switzerland and the Grisons, leaving the affairs of his diocese in the hands of Monsignor Owen Lewis, his vicar-general. He began in the Valle Mesolcina; here not only was there heresy to be fought, but also witchcraft and sorcery, and at Roveredo it was discovered that 'the provost or rector, was the foremost in sorceries'". During his pastoral visit to the region, 150 people were arrested for practicing witchcraft. Eleven women and the provost were condemned by the civil authorities to be burned alive.

Reacting to the pressure of the Protestant Reformation, Borromeo encouraged Ludwig Pfyffer in his development of the "Golden League" but did not live to see its formation in 1586. Based in Lucerne, the organization (also called the Borromean League) linked activities of several Swiss Catholic cantons of Switzerland, which became the centre of Catholic Counter-Reformation efforts and was determined to expel heretics. It created severe strains in the Swiss civil administration and caused the break-up of the Appenzell canton along religious lines.

== Controversy and last days ==
Charged with implementing the reforms dictated by the Council of Trent, Borromeo's uncompromising stance brought him into conflict with secular leaders, priests, and even the Pope. He met with much opposition to his reforms. The governor of the province and many of the senators addressed complaints to the courts of Rome and Madrid.

In 1584, during his annual retreat at Monte Varallo, he fell ill with "intermittent fever and ague", and on returning to Milan grew rapidly worse. After receiving the last rites, he quietly died on 3 November at the age of 46.

== Veneration ==
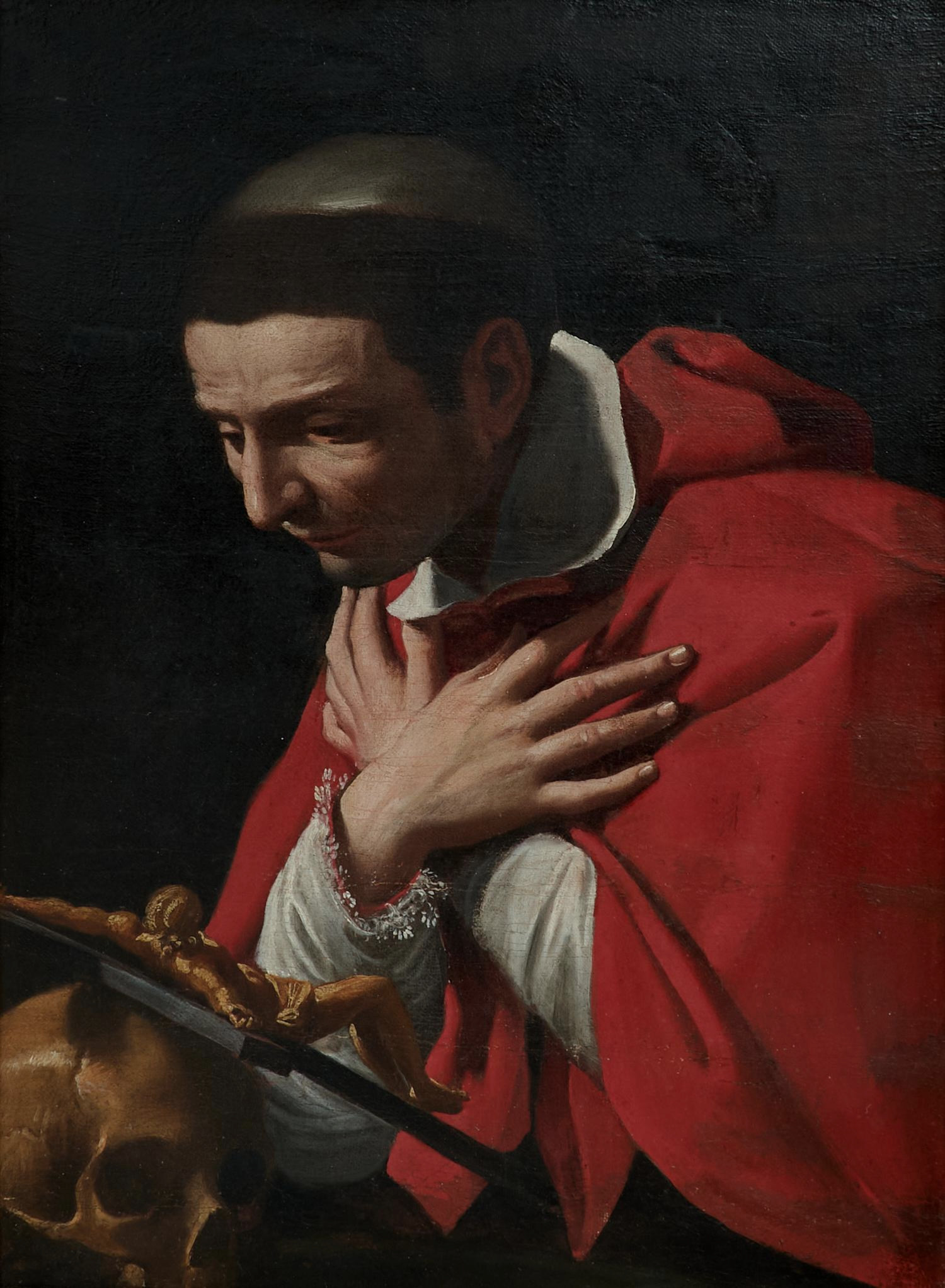
St. Charles Borromeo in contemplation, painting by Giovanni Lanfranco (1582–1647), c. 1614–15, oil on canvas, 69 x 51 cm

Following his death, popular devotion to Borromeo arose quickly and continued to grow. The Milanese celebrated his anniversary as though he were already a saint, and supporters in a number of cities collected documentation to support his canonization. In 1602 Clement VIII beatified Borromeo. In 1604, his case was sent to the Congregation of Rites. On 1 November 1610, Pope Paul V canonized Borromeo. Three years later, the church added his feast to the General Roman Calendar for celebration on 4 November. Along with Guarinus of Palestrina and perhaps Anselm of Lucca, he is one of only two or three cardinal-nephews to have been canonized.

Charles Borromeo is the patron saint of bishops, catechists and seminarians.

=== Iconography ===
Borromeo's emblem is the Latin word humilitas (humility), which is a portion of the Borromeo shield. He is usually represented in art in his robes, barefoot, carrying the cross as archbishop, with a rope around his neck, one hand raised in blessing, thus recalling his work during the plague.

== Sources ==
Borromeo' biography was originally written by three of his contemporaries: Agostino Valerio (afterwards cardinal and Bishop of Verona) and Carlo Bascape (General of the Barnabites, afterwards Bishop of Novara), who wrote their contributions in Latin, and Pietro Giussanno (a priest), who wrote his in Italian. Giussanno's account was the most detailed of the three.

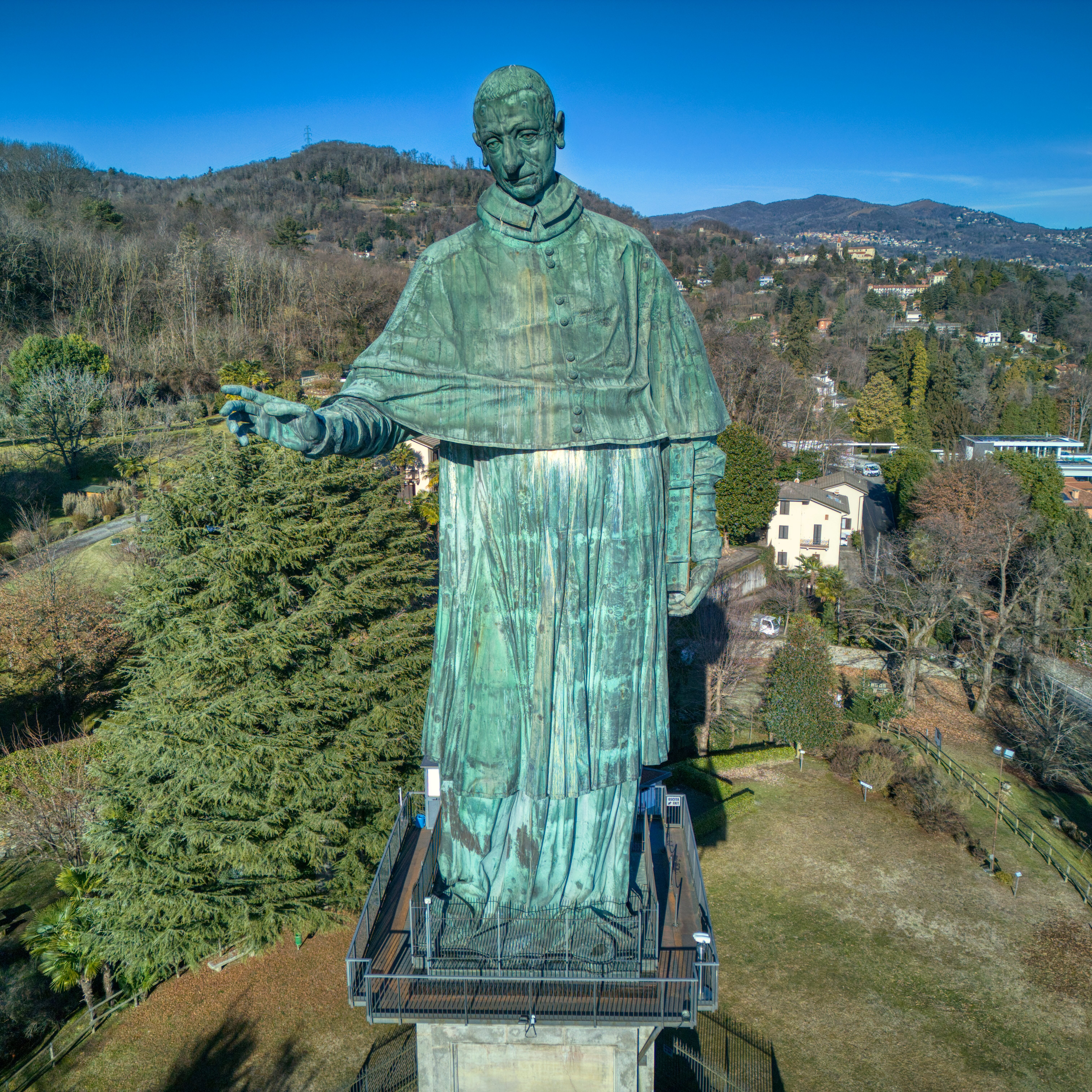
Il Sancarlone (English: The huge Saint Charles): colossal statue of Carlo Borromeo erected in Arona, Italy in 1697. The work of Giovanni Battista Crespi, the statue is 23 m tall and stands on a plinth 12 m in height.

== Legacy ==
Borromeo's correspondence shows his influential position in Europe during his lifetime. The popes under whom he served sought his advice. The Catholic sovereigns of Europe – Henry III of France, Philip II of Spain, Mary, Queen of Scots – and others showed how they valued his influence. Cardinal Valerio of Verona said of him that Borromeo was "to the well-born a pattern of virtue, to his brother cardinals an example of true nobility." Cardinal Baronius styled him "a second Ambrose, whose early death, lamented by all good men, inflicted great loss on the Church."

Late in the sixteenth or at the beginning of the seventeenth century, Catholics in England circulated among themselves a "Life of St. Charles".

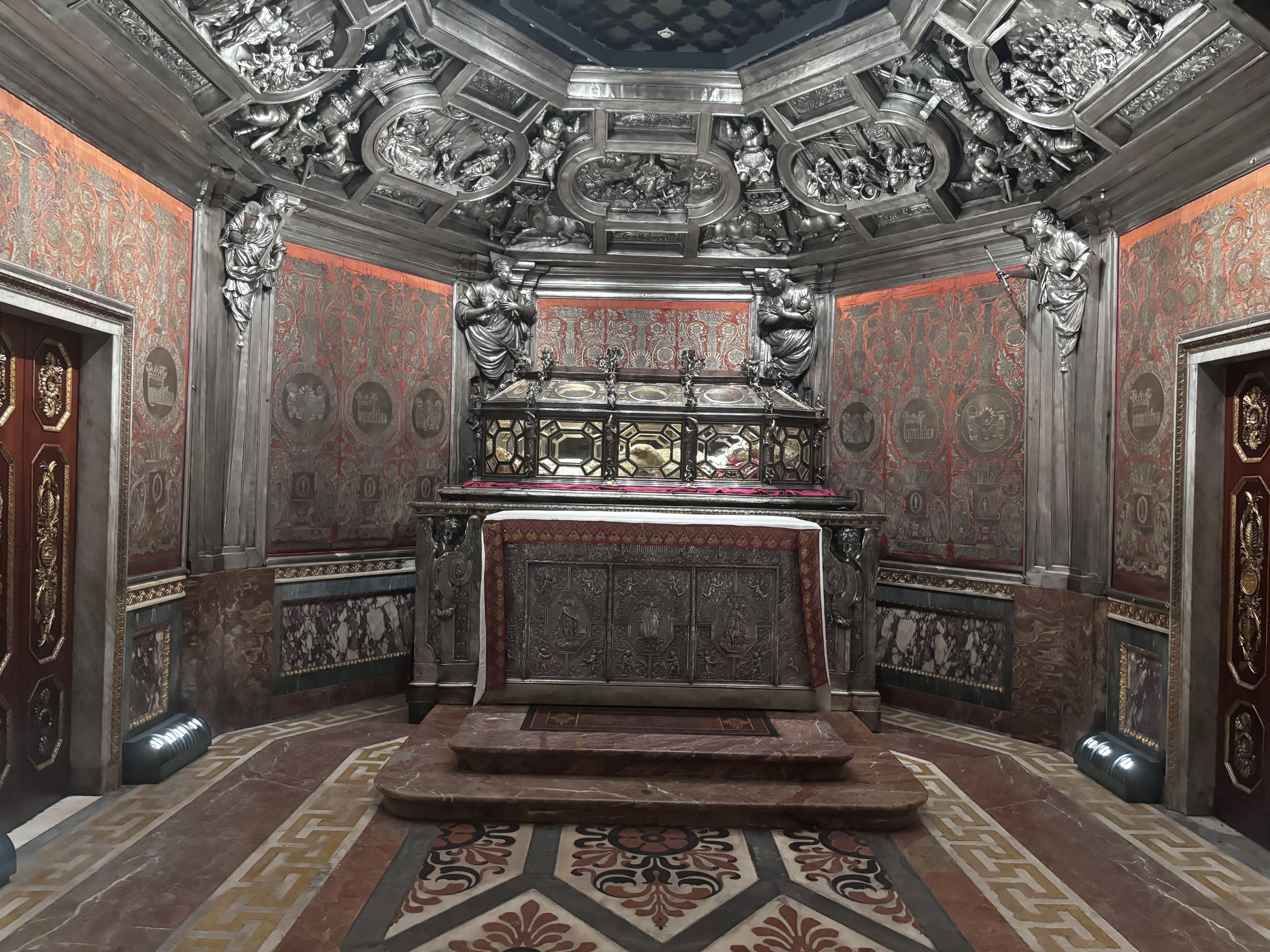
The Crypt of Saint Charles Borromeo in June 2024

=== Monuments ===
- Contrary to Borromeo's last wishes, the Duomo di Milano created a memorial crypt to honour him at the church.
- His relative Federico Borromeo and admirers commissioned a statue 20 m high that was erected on the hill above Arona, as they regarded him as an important leader of the Counter-Reformation.

=== Writings ===
- Besides the Noctes Vaticanae, to which he appeared to have contributed, Borromeo's written legacy consisted only of some homilies, discourses and sermons, with a collection of letters. Borromeo's sermons have been translated into many languages.

=== Music ===
- Marc-Antoine Charpentier composed a motet, Pestis Mediolanensis, commemorating Borromeo's work during the plague of 1576.

=== Churches ===
A large number of churches dedicated to St. Charles Borromeo exist, including:

==== Europe ====
- Karlskirche, Vienna, Austria
- St Charles Borromeo Church, Sheffield
- St Charles Borromeo Church, Kingston upon Hull, England
- St. Charles Borromeo RC Church, Hampton Magna, England
- St. Charles Borromeo RC Church, Aigburth, Liverpool, England
- Our Lady and St Charles Borromeo Catholic Church, Wisbech, England
- St. Charles Borromeo Roman Catholic Oratory, North Kelvinside, Glasgow, Scotland
- St. Charles Borromeo Church, Antwerp, Belgium
- San Carlo ai Catinari, Rome, Italy
- San Carlo al Corso, Rome, Italy
- San Carlo alle Quattro Fontane, Rome, Italy
- St. Charles Borromeo Roman Catholic Church, Pancevo, Vojvodina, Serbia
- Church of St. Charles Borromeo (Warsaw, Poland)
- Chiesa San Carlo Borromeo, Biasca, Ticino, Switzerland
- St. Charles Borromeo Cemetery Church, Vienna
- St. Charles Borromeo Church, Leixlip, Ireland
- St Charles Borromeo, Fitzrovia, London, England

==== North America ====
- St. Charles Borromeo Catholic Church, Peru, Indiana
- Saint Charles Borromeo Catholic Church, Grand Coteau, Louisiana
- St. Charles Borromeo Cathedral (Cathédrale Saint-Charles-Borromée) Joliette Quebec Canada
- St. Charles Borromeo Catholic Church, Fermeuse, Newfoundland, Canada
- Saint Charles Borromeo Catholic Church, Toronto, Ontario, Canada
- St. Charles Borromeo Catholic Church, Read, Ontario, Canada
- Saint Charles Borromeo Catholic Church, North Hollywood, California
- St Charles Borromeo Catholic Church, Visalia, California
- Cathedral of San Carlos Borromeo, California
- Mission San Carlos Borromeo de Carmelo, California
- St. Charles Borromeo Parish Church, Sacramento, California
- St. Charles Borromeo Catholic Church and Academy (Pt. Loma, California)
- St. Charles Borromeo Roman Catholic Church, Port Charlotte, Florida
- St. Charles Borromeo Roman Catholic Church in Hampshire, Illinois
- St. Charles Borromeo Church, Chicago, Illinois
- St. Charles Borromeo Parish, Melrose Park, Illinois
- St. Charles Borromeo Church (Destrehan, Louisiana)
- St. Charles Borromeo Church, Brooklyn New York
- St. Charles Borromeo Church (New York City), New York
- St. Charles's Church (Staten Island, New York)
- St. Charles Borromeo Catholic Church (Nederland, Texas)
- St. Charles Borromeo Catholic Church in St. Charles, Missouri
- St. Charles Borromeo Catholic Church in Minneapolis, Minnesota
- St. Charles Borromeo (St. Charles, Minnesota)
- St. Charles Borromeo Catholic Church (Oakes, North Dakota)
- St. Charles Borromeo Catholic Church (Kettering, Ohio)
- St. Charles Borromeo (Lima, Ohio)
- St. Charles Borromeo Church (Parma, Ohio)
- The neighborhood of Pointe-Saint-Charles
- St. Charles Borromeo (South Charleston, Ohio)
- St. Charles Borromeo (Toledo, Ohio)
- St. Charles Borromeo in Pikesville, Maryland
- St. Charles Borromeo Catholic Church (Pittsfield, MA)
- St. Charles Borromeo Catholic Church (Woburn, Massachusetts)
- St. Charles Borromeo Catholic Church (Picayune, Mississippi)
- St. Charles Borromeo Catholic Church (Gretna, Nebraska)
- St. Charles Borromeo Catholic Church (Skillman, New Jersey)
- St. Charles Borromeo Roman Catholic Church in Greece, New York
- St. Charles Borromeo Catholic Church (Syracuse, New York)
- St. Charles Borromeo Catholic Church (Ahoskie, North Carolina)
- St. Charles Borromeo Catholic Church (Morganton, North Carolina)
- St. Charles Borromeo Catholic Church (Drexel Hill, Pennsylvania)
- St Charles Borromeo Roman Catholic Church (Fermeuse, Newfoundland and Labrador)
- St. Charles Borromeo Roman Catholic Church, est. 1846, Woonsocket, Rhode Island
- St. Charles Borromeo Catholic Church (Milan, Indiana), in Ripley County
- St. Charles Church (Arlington, Virginia)
- St. Charles Parish, Spokane, Washington
- St. Charles Borromeo Catholic Church (Oklahoma City, OK)
- St. Charles Borromeo Catholic Church (Du Bois, Illinois)

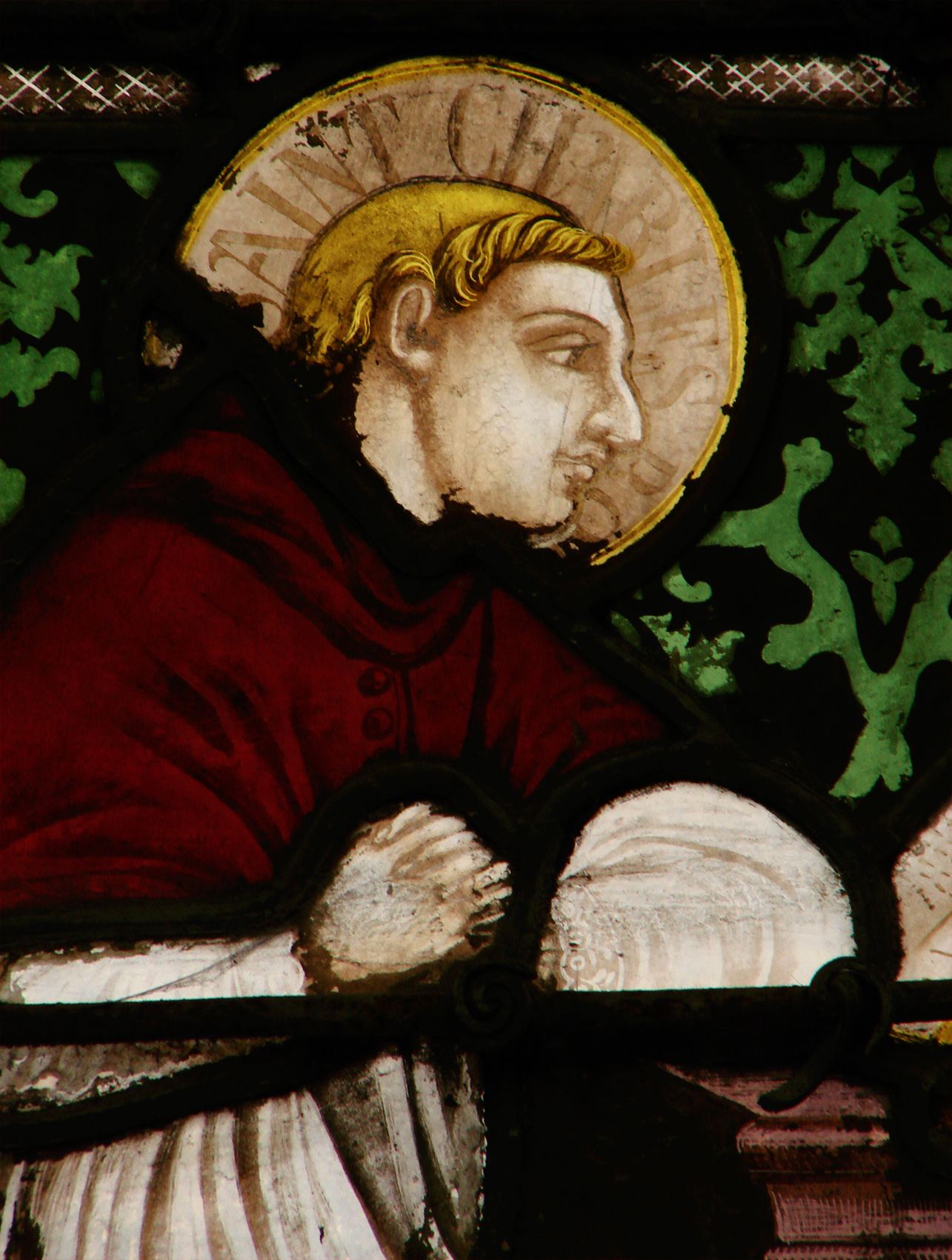
Depiction of Charles Borromeo in a stained glass window

- St. Charles Borromeo Catholic Church (Meredith, NH)
- St. Charles Borromeo Catholic Church (Milwaukee, WI)
- St. Charles Borromeo Catholic Church (Kingsland, TX)
- St. Charles Borromeo Catholic Church (Philadelphia, Pa)
- Parroquia San Carlos Borromeo (Aguadilla, PR)
- St. Charles Borromeo Catholic Church, Kansas City, Missouri
- St-Charles-Borromée, Catholic Church, Charlesbourg, Québec
- St. Charles, Catholic Church, Québec, Canada
- * St. Charles Borromeo Catholic Church and School (Bloomington, IN)

==== South America ====
- Cathedral of San Carlos de Bariloche, Argentina
- St. Charles Borromeo Cathedral, São Carlos, Brazil
- Cathedral Basilica of San Carlos Borromeo (Puno), Peru
- San Carlos Borromeo, San Carlos, Uruguay
- Cathedral of San Carlos (Cojedes), Venezuela
- Church of Chonchi, Chiloé, Chile (UNESCO World Heritage Site)

=== Seminaries ===
- St Charles Borromeo Seminary of the Archdiocese of Košice, in Košice, Slovakia
- St. Charles Borromeo Seminary of the Archdiocese of Philadelphia, Pennsylvania, United States
- San Carlos Seminary of the Archdiocese of Manila in Makati, Philippines
- Colegio San Carlos, a recognized primary and secondary school in Bogotá, Colombia, and home for a Benedictine community of priests
- Saint Charles Borromeo Major Seminary of Nyakibanda in Rwanda
- St Charles' Seminary in Perth, Australia
- Borromeo Seminary in Wickliffe, Ohio
- St. Charles Seminary in Carthagena, Ohio, now a retirement home
- St. Charles Seminary (Staten Island, New York), closed and slated for private homes
- St. Charles Seminary (SVD), Goden Rock, Trichy, Tamil Nadu, India

· St Charles Borromeo Minor Seminary Senior High School, Tamale, Ghana

=== Other ===
- His nephew, Federico Borromeo (1564–1631), was archbishop of Milan from 1595 and founded the Ambrosian Library in that city. He donated his collection of art and literature to the library. He appeared as a character in Alessandro Manzoni's novel The Betrothed (I promessi sposi).
- Sint. Borromeus Hospital, the first Catholic hospital in Indonesia, was founded by Perkumpulan Perhimpunan St. Carolus Vereeniging (PPSC). It has been managed by Kongregasi Suster-Suster Cinta Kasih St. Carolus Borromeus (Sisters of Mercy of St. Borromeo) since its foundation in 1913.
- Borromeo was crucial in furthering the career of composer Orfeo Vecchi.
- Borromeo is one of four people mentioned at the beginning of the Catechism of the Catholic Church, as responsible for the Council of Trent, which gave way to the modern-day catechism. The others are Peter Canisius, Turibius of Mongrovejo and Robert Bellarmine.
- Saint Charles Preparatory School, a former college seminary now a four-year Catholic college preparatory school in Columbus, Ohio
- Lewis University, a Catholic and Lasallian University, St. Charles Borromeo North Campus
- St. Charles, Missouri
- St. Charles, Illinois
- St. Charles, Minnesota
- São Carlos, Brazil
- Saint-Charles-Borromée, Quebec, Canada
- San Carlos City, Pangasinan, Philippines
- St. Charles Academy in San Carlos City, Pangasinan, Philippines
- The San Carlos de Borromeo Fortress on Margarita Island, state of Nueva Esparta, Venezuela, completed in 1684, was intended to help protect settlements in the Bay of Pampatar area against the constant threat of piracy
- University of San Carlos in Cebu City, Philippines
- Universidad de San Carlos de Guatemala in Guatemala, originally named "Royal and Pontifical University of San Carlos Borromeo"

== See also ==
- Guastallines – Members of the College of Guastalla
- Oblates of Saints Ambrose and Charles – Ambrosian Catholic organisation
- Order of Saint Carlo
- Saint Charles Borromeo, patron saint archive
- Sancarlone – Statue of Charles Borromeo near Arona, Italy
- Silent preaching – Term in Catholic art

== Sources ==
- Media related to Charles Borromeo at Wikimedia Commons
- A Sala, Documenti circa la vita e la gesta di Borromeo (4 vols., Milan: 1857–1859)
- Chanoine Silvain, Histoire de St Charles Borromeo (Milan: 1884)
- A Cantono, "Un grande riformatore del secolo XVI" (Florence: 1904); "Borromus" in Herzog-Hauck, Realencyklopädie (Leipzig: 1897).
