= Brachetti =

Brachetti is a surname. Notable people with the surname include:

- Aldo Maria Brachetti Peretti (born 1932), Italian oil executive
- Arturo Brachetti (born 1957), Italian quick-charge artist
- Ferdinando Brachetti Peretti (born 1960), Italian oil executive
- Ugo Brachetti Peretti (born 1965), Italian oil executive
