= Pierre Casiraghi =

Monégasque royal

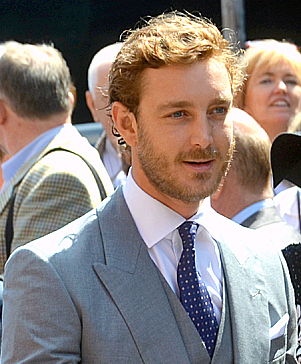
- Casiraghi in 2017
- Born: Pierre Rainier Stefano Casiraghi; 5 September 1987 (age 39); Princess Grace Hospital Centre, La Colle, Monaco
- Education: Bocconi University; University of Paris II Panthéon-Assas; Lycée International François-Ier
- Occupations: Businessman; Majority shareholder, Engeco S.A. & Monacair
- Spouse: Beatrice Borromeo (m. 2015)
- Children: 3
- Parent(s): Stefano Casiraghi; Princess Caroline of Monaco
- Relatives: Andrea Casiraghi (brother); Charlotte Casiraghi (sister); Princess Alexandra of Hanover (half-sister)

Pierre Rainier Stefano Casiraghi (born 5 September 1987) is the younger son and youngest of three children of Caroline, Princess of Hanover, and her second husband, Stefano Casiraghi. He is the maternal-line grandson of Rainier III, Prince of Monaco, and US actress Grace Kelly. Casiraghi is eighth in the line of succession to the Monegasque throne, following his twin cousins Hereditary Prince Jacques and Princess Gabriella, his mother, his brother Andrea, nephews Alexandre and Maximilian, and niece India.

== Early life and education ==
Casiraghi was born on 5 September 1987 at Princess Grace Hospital Centre, in La Colle, Monaco. He is named after his maternal great-grandfather, Prince Pierre, Duke of Valentinois, his maternal grandfather, Prince Rainier III, and his father. His godparents are his uncle Prince Albert II and aunt Laura Sabatini. Casiraghi was three years old at the time of his father's death in a boating accident. He spent his earliest years, after his father's death, living at his mother's farmhouse in the town of Saint-Rémy-de-Provence.

He attended a state school in Saint-Rémy-de-Provence. However, after his mother's remarriage to Ernst August, Prince of Hanover, the family moved to the Fontainebleau area near Paris. It is assumed that Casiraghi passed the French Baccalaureate exam in the summer of 2005 since he shortly afterwards began university. One year later, he moved to Milan to begin a three-year undergraduate course in international economics and management at Bocconi University. Besides French, he is fluent in Italian, English, and knows some German. He also plays the saxophone.

== Humanitarian and business activities ==
From 30 January to 13 February 2007, Casiraghi accompanied his mother on a humanitarian tour of Africa. They visited Niger, Burundi, the Democratic Republic of Congo, and South Africa on behalf of Princess Caroline's role as President of AMADE Mondiale.

In June 2009, Casiraghi became the majority shareholder of the Monaco-based construction company Engeco, which his father founded in 1984. His uncle Marco remains in the position of President over Engeco. Casiraghi and his brother, Andrea, collectively own the majority shares (70%) Monacair.

Casiraghi is on the Management Committee of the Yacht Club de Monaco. In this capacity, he sponsored the "Sail for a Cause" charity race, which was organized by his cousin Leticia de Massy, using her social network LeSpot.Net to promote it. Sail for a Cause raises money for two charities: the Monaco Collectif Humanitaire and the Maison Notre Dame de Paix in Chad. The former funds surgeries for children around the world; the latter helps migrants.

In 2011, Casiraghi was inducted as an honorary member of the Jeune Chambre Economique de Monaco (JCEM).

== Sailboat racing ==
Casiraghi is a participant in the sport of sailboat racing. In January 2014, he was part of the Maserati team in the Cape2Rio competition. His team completed the journey from Cape Town to Rio in a record 10 days, 11 hours, 29 minutes, and 57 seconds. Casiraghi was a crew member of the Monaco Racing Fleet captained by Tommaso Chieffi which was first to cross the finish line in the 2013 edition of the Palermo-Monte Carlo Regatta. Casiraghi and the Monaco Racing Fleet also won the 10th edition of the Palmero-Monte Carlo race in August 2014., Casiraghi's boat, the Esimit Europa 2, was the winner of the Giraglia Rolex Cup in June 2014.

Casiraghi is the skipper of Team Malizia, the crew which sails a hydrofoil sailboat (also called a foiling catamaran) in the annual GC32 Racing Tour. Team Malizia takes its name from Il Malizia ('The Cunning'), and which was the nickname assigned to Casiraghi's medieval ancestor François Grimaldi. Together with Boris Herrmann from Team Malizia he transported Greta Thunberg and her father Svante Thunberg across the Atlantic to enable her participation in the annual United Nations Framework Convention on Climate Change.

In August 2017, Casiraghi paired with Boris Herrmann to sail in the Fastnet Race. Starting at Cowes, moving up to Ireland and then back down to Devonshire, they finished the race in third place.

== Auto racing ==
Casiraghi is a fixture in the Monte-Carlo Historic Rally, a vintage automobile race that occurs every year in January. In May 2014, he competed in a professional auto race for the first time at the Volkswagen Scirocco R-Cup in Hockenheim. He was a celebrity guest starter in the race, driving car No. 26, and finished 22nd in the first race and 20th in the second race. He said he was encouraged to enter the race by family friend and former racing driver Jacky Ickx.

== Personal life ==
Casiraghi has been in a relationship with Beatrice Borromeo since May 2008. She is a member of the prominent Italian aristocratic family the House of Borromeo. She is the daughter of Don Carlo Ferdinando Borromeo, Count of Arona (born in 1935), and his long-time companion, Countess Donna Paola Marzotto (born in 1955). She has three older half-sisters from her father's marriage to German model and former Miss Germany Marion Sybil Zota: Isabella, married to Ugo Brachetti Peretti, a manager (oil executive) from a noble family, son of Count Aldo Maria Brachetti Peretti; Lavinia, married to John Elkann, the son of Alain Elkann and Margherita Agnelli de Pahlen, head of the Agnelli family and member of the steering committee of the Bilderberg Conferences; and Matilde, married to Prince Antonius zu Fürstenberg.

They were married in a civil ceremony on 25 July 2015 in the gardens of the Prince's Palace of Monaco. The religious ceremony took place on 1 August 2015 on Isolino di San Giovanni, one of the Borromean Islands on Lake Maggiore, Italy. Pierre and Beatrice's first child, Stefano Ercole Carlo, was born on 28 February 2017. Their second child, Francesco Carlo Albert, was born on 21 May 2018. Their third child and only daughter, Bianca Caroline Marta, was born on 4 October 2025.

In February 2012, Casiraghi was briefly hospitalised following a physical altercation at a nightclub in New York's Meatpacking District. Casiraghi and others, including Vladimir Restoin Roitfeld, approached the table of businessman Adam Hock, who was accompanied by models Natasha Poly, Anja Rubik, and Valentina Zelyaeva, where words were exchanged and an altercation ensued. Hock, who was later charged on eight counts of misdemeanour assault, alleges that Casiraghi was the aggressor, and that he struck Casiraghi and his companions in self-defence. Casiraghi was treated at New York Presbyterian Hospital for a laceration, bruising, and swelling of his face.

== Honours ==
- Monaco: Medal for Physical Education and Sports, Third Class (17 November 2026)

Lines of succession
Preceded by India Casiraghi	Succession to the Monegasque throne 8th in line	Succeeded by Stefano Casiraghi
