= Peretti =

Peretti is an Italian or Corsican surname. Notable people with the surname include:

- Achille Peretti (artist) (1857–1923), Italian painter, sculptor and anarchist
- Achille Peretti (1911–1983), French politician
- Aldo Maria Brachetti Peretti (1932–2025), chairman of the Italian company API Group
- Alessandro Peretti di Montalto (1571–1623), Italian Catholic Cardinal
- Carlo Peretti (1930–2018), Italian water polo player
- Chelsea Peretti (born 1978), American writer and comedian
- Cynthia Peretti (1948−2009), American wrestler and trainer, known as "Princess Jasmine"
- Diego Peretti (born 1963), Argentine actor and psychiatrist
- Elsa Peretti (1940–2021), Italian jewellery designer
- Felice Peretti (1521–1590), Pope Sixtus V
- Ferdinando Brachetti Peretti (born 1960), chairman and CEO of API Group
- Flavia Peretti (1574–1606), Duchess of Bracciano and niece of Felice Peretti
- Francesco Peretti di Montalto (1597–1655), Italian Catholic cardinal
- Frank Peretti (born 1951), American novelist
- Giorgio Peretti (born 1983), Argentine filmmaker
- Hugo Peretti (1916–1986), American songwriter and record producer
- Jacques Peretti (born 1967), investigative reporter, broadcaster and filmmaker
- Jean-Marie Peretti (born 1946), French teacher-researcher in human resources management
- Jonah Peretti (born 1974), American Internet entrepreneur
- Lucia Peretti (born 1990), Italian short-track speed-skater
- Marianne Peretti (1927–2022), Franco-Brazilian artist
- Osvaldo Peretti (1921–?), Argentine footballer
- Patrice de Peretti (1972–2000), better known as Depé, French association football supporter
- Pedro Peretti (born 1956), Argentine activist
- Pietro Perti or Peretti (1648–1714), Italian Baroque sculptor and architect
- Roberto Peretti (born 1966), Italian short track speed skater
- Ugo Brachetti Peretti (born 1965), Italian oil executive
- Vanessa Peretti (born 1986), model and Miss Venezuela International 2006
