= Marta Ferri =

Italian fashion designer (born 1984)

- Born: 21 July 1984 (age 41); Milan, Italy
- Noble family: Borromeo
- Spouse: Carlo Ludovico Borromeo (m. 2012)
- Father: Fabrizio Ferri
- Mother: Barbara Frua de Angeli
- Occupation: fashion designer

Marta Ferri Borromeo (born 21 July 1984) is an Italian fashion designer. By marriage, she is a member of the House of Borromeo, an Italian noble family.

== Early life ==
Ferri was born on 21 July 1984 in Milan, Italy. She is the daughter of Barbara Frua de Angeli, an interior decorator, and Fabrizio Ferri, a photographer.

== Career ==
After completing school, Ferri moved to New York City for four years and worked as a set designer, assistant photographer, digital tech assistant, personal assistant, and photo shoot producer. In 2009, she moved back to Italy and began working for Prada as a visual merchandiser. After a year and a half in Italy, she moved to Argentina and started a jewellery line called Nuda. While in Argentina, she began experimenting with fabrics and making handmade dresses. She opened her own atelier, Banner, in Milan. She sells her dresses, which are exclusively made-to-measure, at her atelier. Her first dress collection debuted in December 2010. She references Isabella Rossellini as a style inspiration. In May 2014, Ferri was invited by the Italian Embassy in Argentina to present her spring collection. In November 2014 she modeled in an advertisement campaign for Buccellati.

In 2016, Ferri collaborated with Italian textile company Molteni & C. to create new and modern designs. In 2019, she developed capsule collections with Sergio Rossi and with the shoe designer Rothy's.

== Personal life ==
She married her childhood friend Carlo Ludovico Borromeo at Pantelleria on 30 June 2012. Guests made donations to the Italian Association for Cancer Research and the Foundation for Research on Cystic Fibrosis on behalf of the couple. Her husband, a member of the House of Borromeo, is the son of Carlo Ferdinando Borromeo, Count of Arona and a brother of Beatrice Borromeo and a half-brother of Matilde Borromeo. She and Carlo have four children. She lives in a Palazzo in the old Milan, a building that was previously owned by the painter Giuseppe Bossi.

In August 2015 she was named on a Vogue best-dressed list after attending the wedding of her sister-in-law, Beatrice Borromeo, and Pierre Casiraghi.
