= House of Borromeo =

Italian noble family

Borromeo
- Noble family
- Motto: Humility to the Name (Latin: Humilitas nomini)
- Country: Duchy of Milan Golden Ambrosian Republic; Transpadane Republic; Cisalpine Republic; Italian Republic; Kingdom of Italy; Kingdom of Lombardy–Venetia Kingdom of Italy
- Current region: Italy; European Union
- Origin: Rome
- Founded: 1445; 581 years ago
- Founder: Vitaliano I
- Titles: Prince of Angera; Marquess of Romagnano; Count of Arona; Count of Peschiera; Lord of Cannobio and Vergante; Lord of Vogogna and Val Vigezzo
- Style: Don or Donna
- Connected families: House of Grimaldi; House of Fürstenberg; Agnelli family
- Estates: Rocca d'Angera; Palazzo Borromeo, Milan; Castel of Peschiera Borromeo; Borromean Islands; Villa Borromeo (former); Villa San Carlo Borromeo (former)
- Deposition: 1797
- Cadet branches: Borromeo Arese

The House of Borromeo is an Italian noble family. They started as merchants in San Miniato in Tuscany around 1300 and became bankers in Milan after 1370. Vitaliano de' Vitaliani, who acquired the name of Borromeo from his uncle Giovanni, became the count of Arona in 1445. His descendants played important roles in the politics of the Duchy of Milan and as cardinals in the Catholic Reformation. In 1916, the head of the family was granted the title Prince of Angera (Principe di Angera) by the King of Italy.

The best known members of the family were the cardinals and archbishops of Milan, Carlo (1538–1584), who was canonized by Pope Paul V in 1610, and Federico (1564–1631), who founded the Ambrosian Library. The figure of the Borromean rings, which forms part of the family's coat of arms, is well known in the diverse fields of topology, psychoanalysis, and theology.

== History ==
Around 1300, this was one of a number of merchant families in San Miniato in Tuscany to carry the name Buonromei or Borromei. (Note: The family's documented history begins at San Miniato; the tradition of an earlier origin in Rome rests solely on speculation about the surname (in medieval usage, a romeo was a pilgrim bound for Rome) and is unsupported by documentary evidence. See "La famiglia Borromeo". borromeo.it (in Italian). and "The Family". The Borromei Bank Research Project, Queen Mary University of London..)

The first member of the family to come to prominence was Filippo di Lazzaro Borromei, one of the richest men of the town. Moneylending appears in the local records before 1368 as a principal source of his income, and he sank the profits into landed property: a survey of 1375 credits him with over 1,200 staiora (roughly 146 hectares) of arable in Sanminiatese territory, together with a mill on the Elsa, two towers and some two dozen houses and farm buildings, while what he owned in Florence was assessed in 1370 at more than 2,000 florins. His wife Talda came of the Lascaris di Tenda family: her younger sister Beatrice would marry the condottiero Facino Cane and later, in 1412, Duke Filippo Maria Visconti of Milan. Filippo led the Ghibellines of San Miniato in the rising of 1367–1370 against the rule of Florence; when the town fell he was taken prisoner, and in 1370 the Florentines put him to death as one of the leaders of the rebellion.

The defeat drove the family out of Tuscany, along two roads that its alliances had marked out in advance. One led to Padua, the first refuge of Filippo's widow and children, where a son, Andrea, was then a student of law; two more sons, Borromeo and Alessandro, went on to run a bank of their own in Venice. In Padua, too, Filippo's daughter Margherita married Giacomo Vitaliani, a patrician who had represented the city as its envoy to Venice; the Vitaliani traced their line back to the eleventh century and had been lords of Bosco, Bojone and Sant'Angelo since about 1100. The other road, opened by the Tenda marriage and its Visconti connection, led to Milan: Giovanni, the youngest son, made his life there from the time of the flight, obtained citizenship in 1395, built up the Borromei bank of Milan on commerce and exchange dealings, and ended his career as the city's treasurer general.

Giovanni was childless, and the two roads of the exile met again in his heir. His sister's son Vitaliano Vitaliani, whose birth falls between 1387 and 1391, became his uncle's adopted son and took the surname Borromeo. (Note: The sources date the adoption differently: the Borromei Bank Research Project places it around 1406–1408, at about the time of Vitaliano's marriage to Ambrogina da Fagnano, while the Dizionario Biografico degli Italiani assigns the formal deed of adoption, which carried the right of succession to Giovanni's estate, to 1431, the year of Giovanni's death.) Made a citizen of Milan in 1416, Vitaliano was appointed ducal treasurer in 1418, with his adoptive father standing surety for him, and on Giovanni's death in 1431 he inherited the bank and the fortune. In 1439 he purchased the town and fief of Arona on the banks of Lago Maggiore, of which he was created count by ducal decree of 26 May 1445, and in January 1449 he bought Angera on the opposite shore of the lake (the castle of Angera is still today owned by the family). Ever since then, the Borromeos have been the land owners (and at times governors) around Lago Maggiore.

=== The "State" of the Borromeo ===
Between the fourteenth century and the seventeenth century, the Borromeo were able to gain control of many fiefs in the Valdossola/Lake Maggiore area. They organised them as an almost independent state within the Duchy of Milan obtaining sovereignty, jurisdictions and control over the local army and fortresses. The "State" was subdivided in ten podesterie: Mergozzo, Omegna, Vogogna, Val Vigezzo, Cannobio, Intra, Laveno, Lesa, Angera and Arona. The podestà of Arona was the main justice administrator for the Borromeo counts over the area and was independent of both the Novara and Milan jurisdictions, the former controllers. The "state" was quite extended, it occupied almost half of the modern Province of Verbano-Cusio-Ossola with an extension of around one thousand square kilometres. The "Borromeo's State" ended in 1797 with the invasion of Milan by Napoleon Bonaparte who revoked all the Borromeo's privileges and jurisdictions over this area; so the Borromeo maintained there only their ample estates as the Borromean Islands.

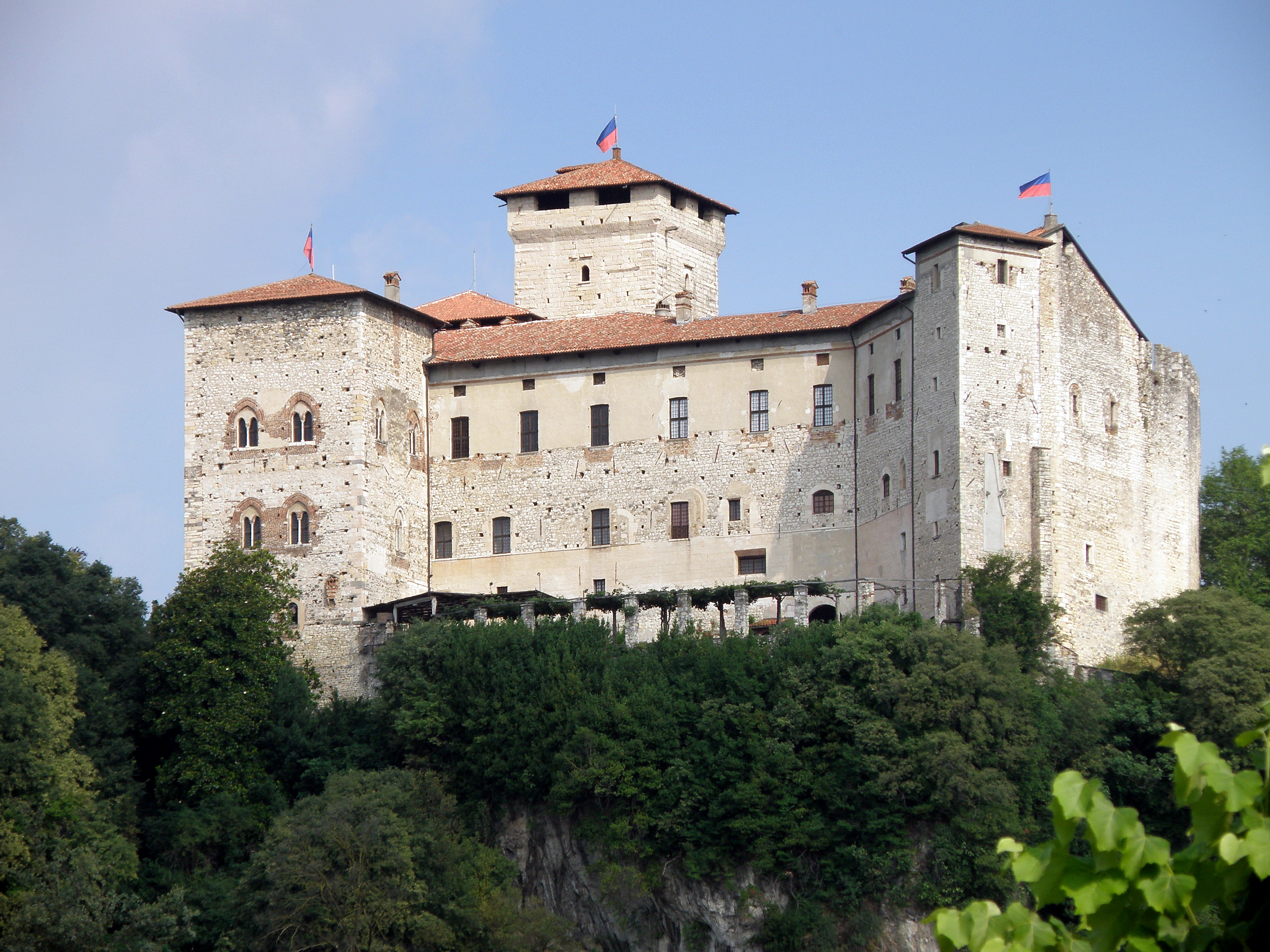
Castle Rocca di Angera

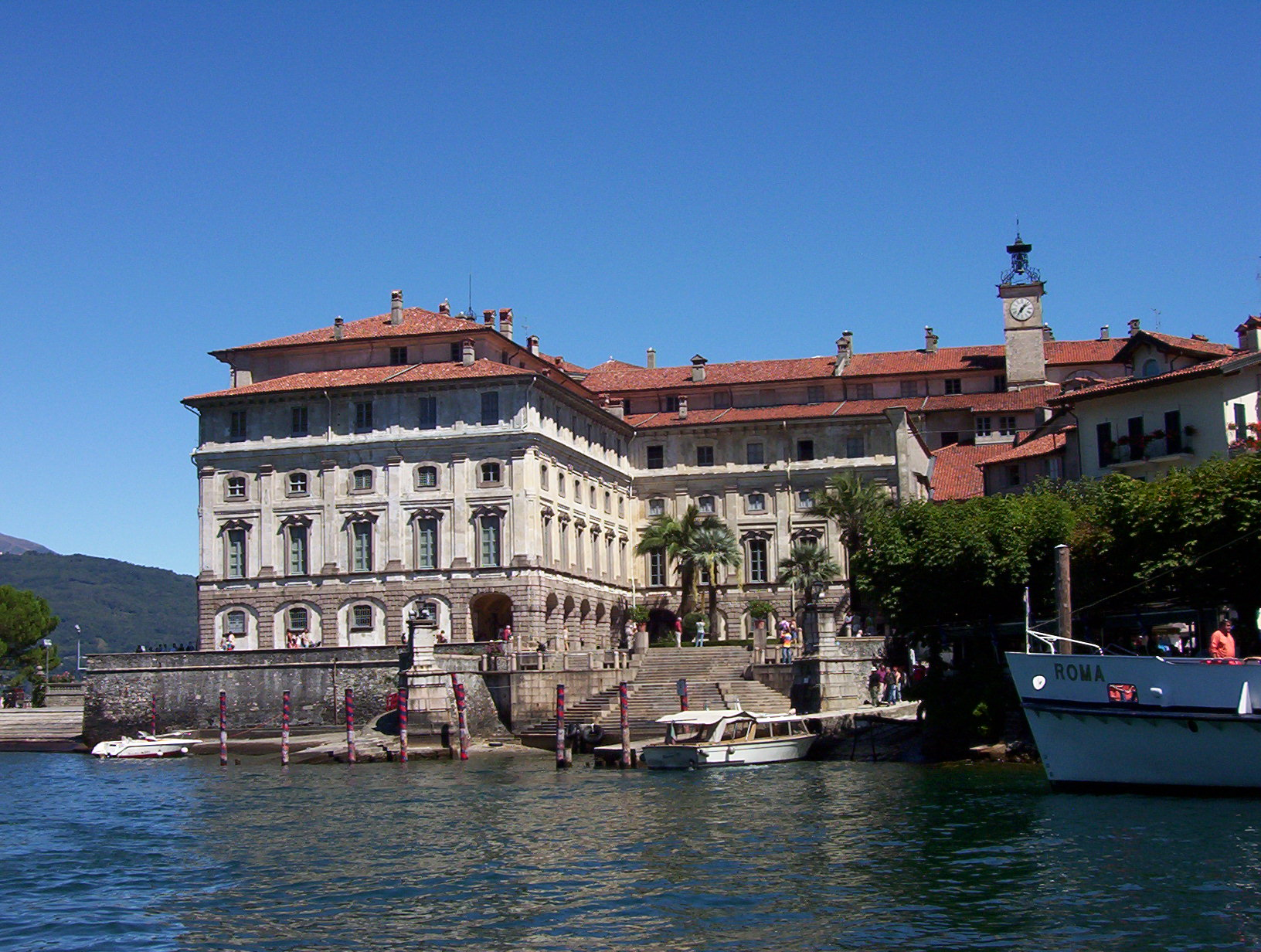
Palace on Isola Bella

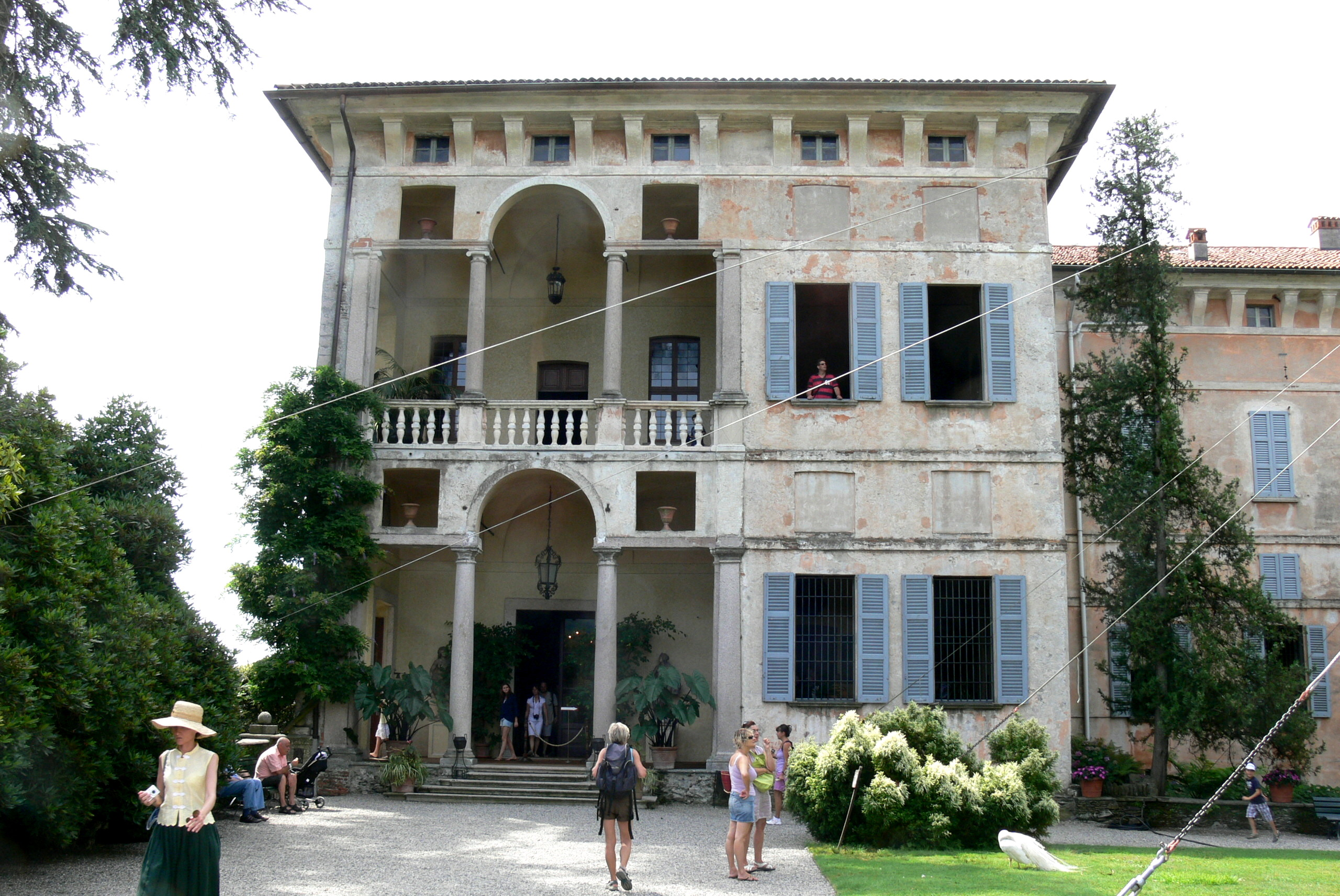
Palace on Isola Madre

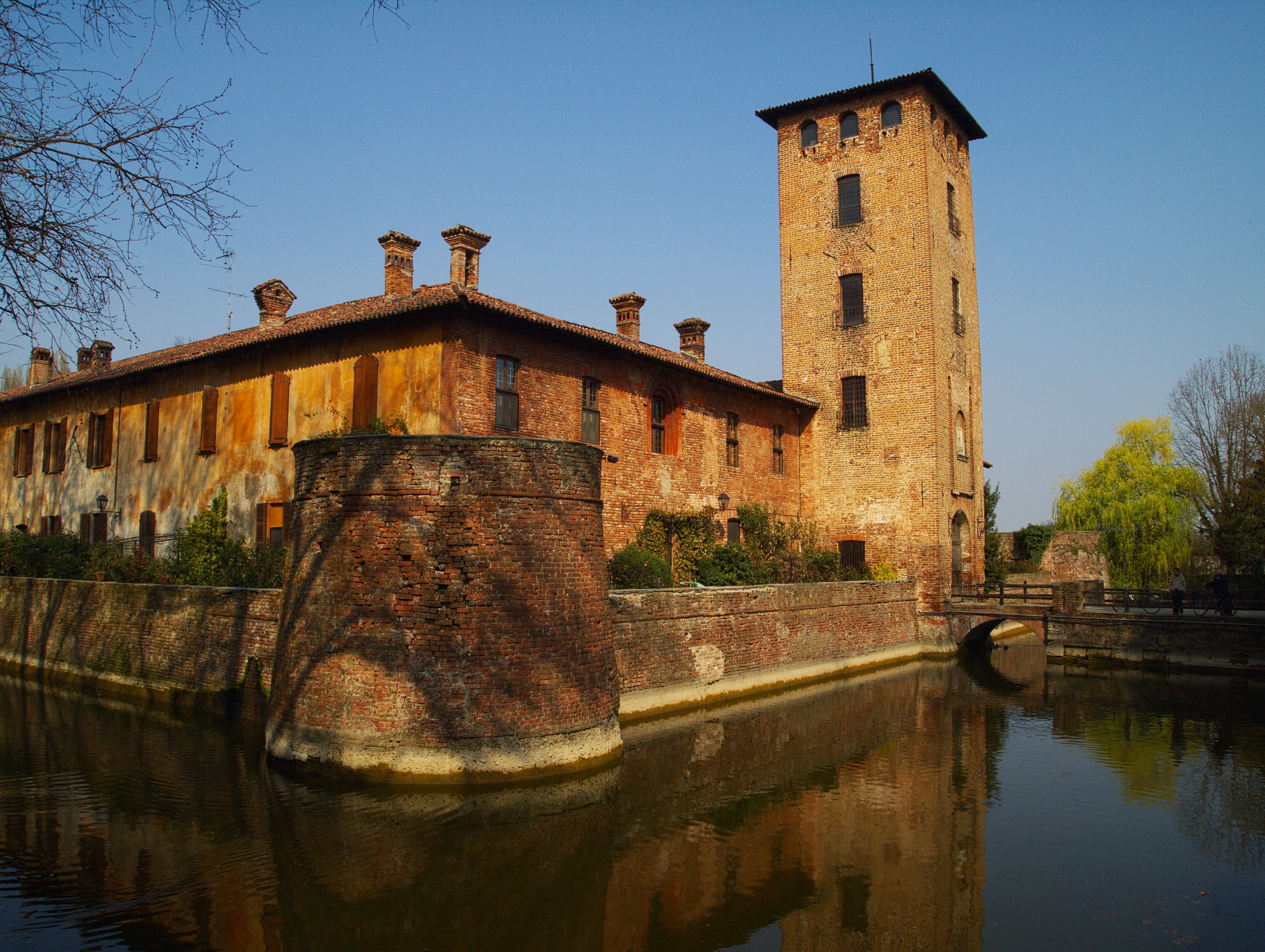
Castello Borromeo in Peschiera Borromeo

=== Cardinals ===
Seven cardinals of the Roman Catholic Church were members of the Borromeo family:

- Carlo Borromeo (St. Charles), *1538 †1584
- Federico Borromeo, *1564 †1631
- Giberto III Borromeo, *1615 †1672
- Federico Borromeo, *1617 †1673
- Giberto Bartolomeo Borromeo, *1671 †1740
- Vitaliano Borromeo, *1720 †1793
- Edoardo Borromeo, *1822 †1881
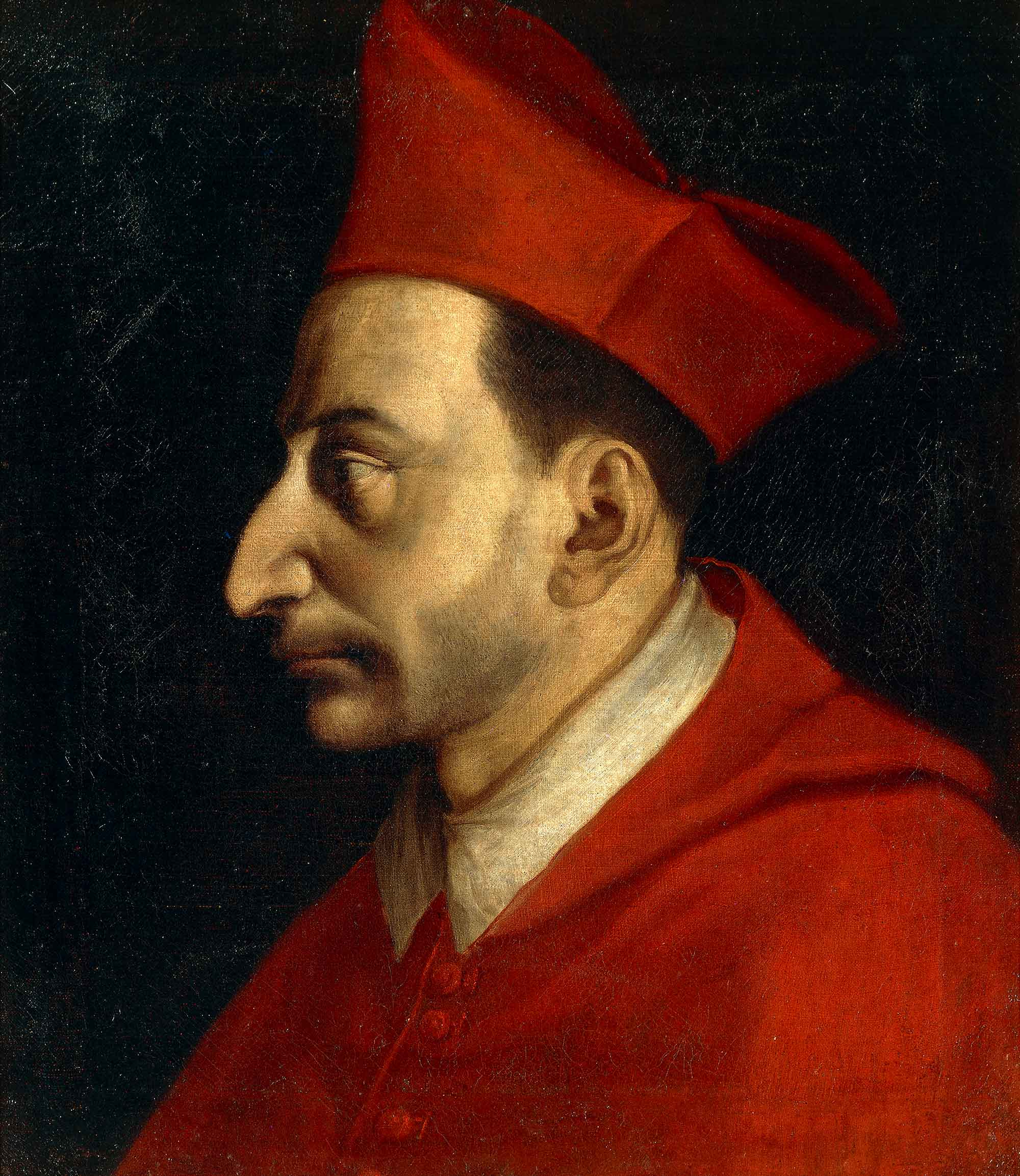
St. Charles

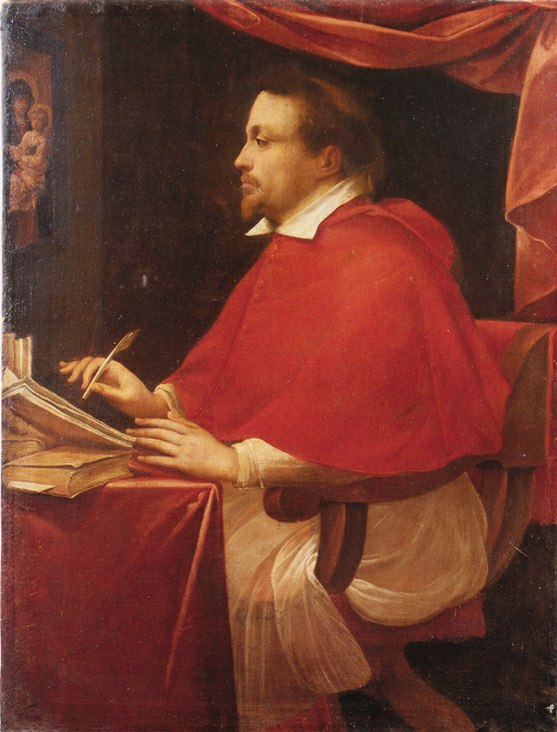
Federico

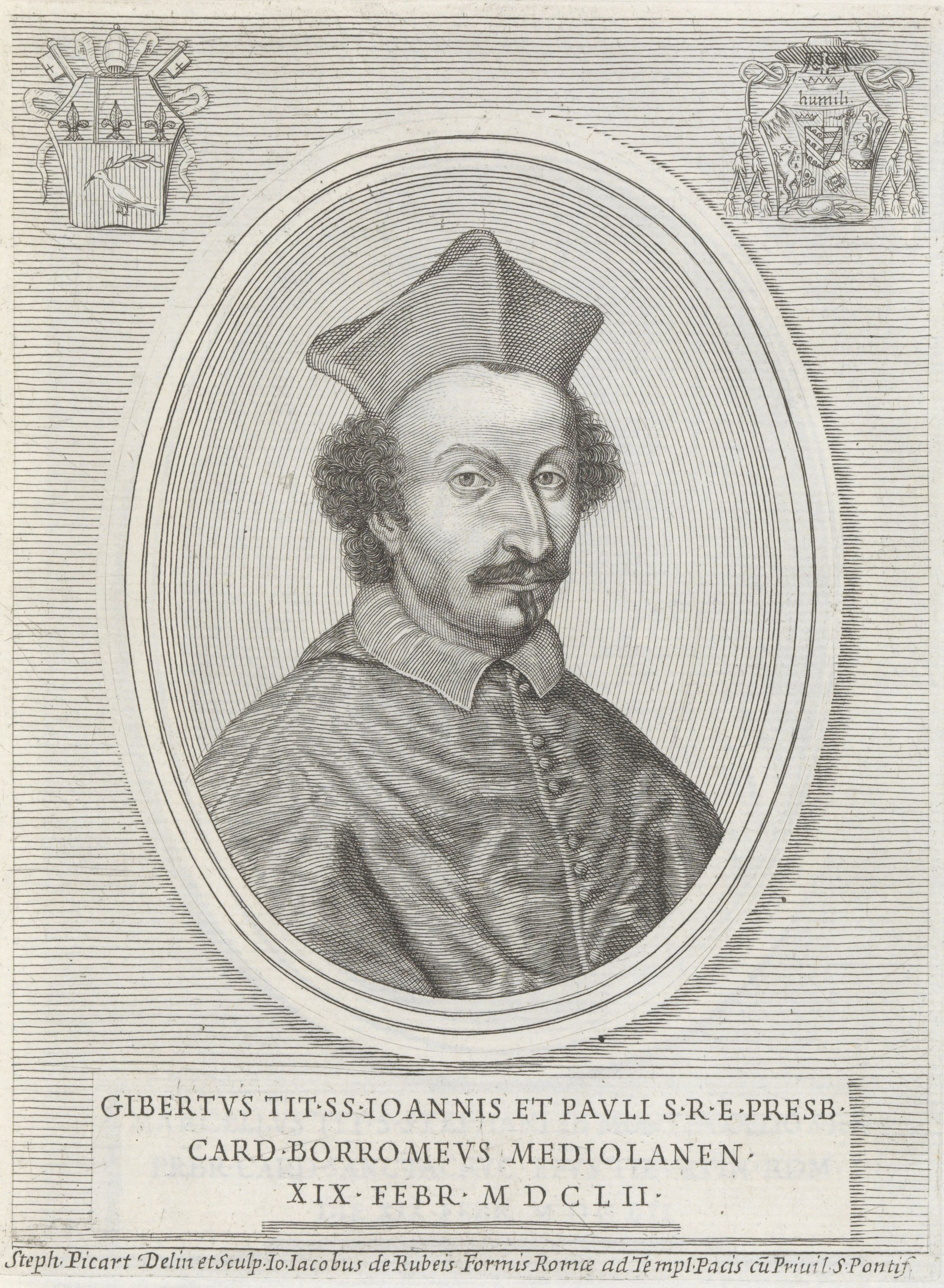
Giberto III

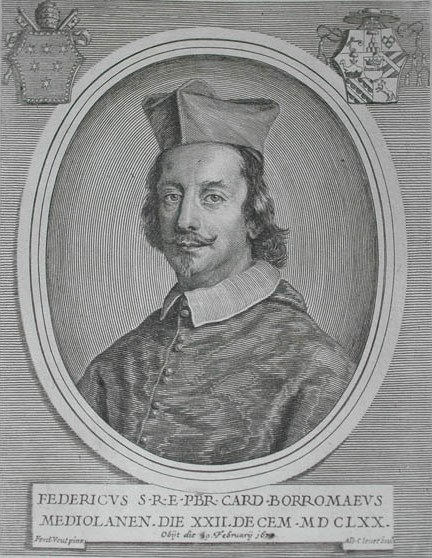
Federico

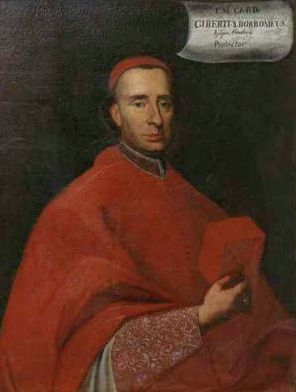
Giberto Bartolomeo

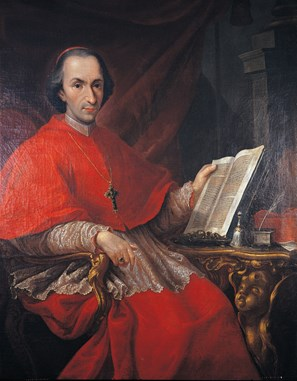
Vitaliano

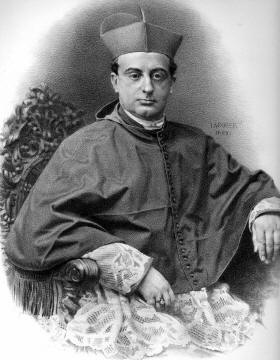
Edoardo

== Styles ==
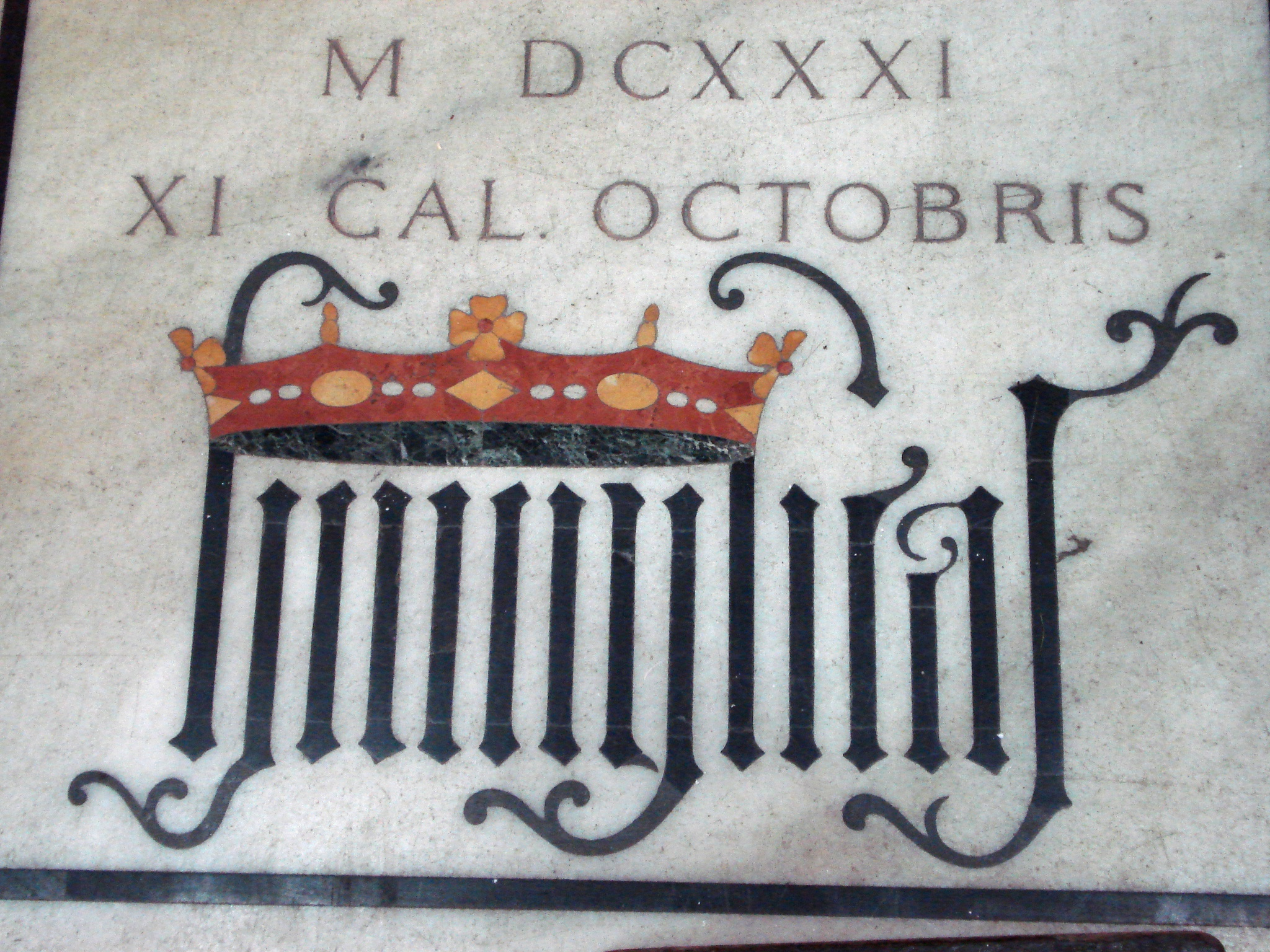
The Latin word "humilitas" in gothic writing, from the tomb of cardinal Federico Borromeo at Milan Cathedral

- Count of Arona, by decree of the duke of Milan dated 26 May 1446 for Vitaliano Vitaliani, adopted Borromeo (1390–1449).
- Count of Peschiera in 1461 for Filippo Borromeo (1419–1464)
- Marquess of Angera, in 1623 by Philip IV of Spain for Cardinal Federico Borromeo (1564–1631), confirmed in 1896 by the King of Italy for Conte Giberto Borromeo Arese
- Prince of Angera, in 1916 by the King of Italy for Conte Giberto Borromeo Arese (in Primogeniture)

== Family members ==
- Vitaliano VI Borromeo (1620–1690), art collector
- Carlo IV Borromeo Arese, 15th Count of Arona, 5th Marquess of Angera (1657–1734), added his mother Giulia Arese's name to his own, became Viceroy of Naples and governor of the Holy Roman Emperor in the Kingdom of Italy
- Giulio Visconti Borromeo Arese (1664–1750), also Viceroy of Naples and minister plenipotentiary of the Austrian Netherlands.
- Giberto Borromeo Arese (1815–1885), painter

== Current members ==
Current members include the daughters of Count Ferdinando Borromeo, a cadet son of Prince Vitaliano Borromeo. These are the four sisters:

- Lavinia Borromeo (1977) is married to John Elkann, the son of Alain Elkann and Margherita Agnelli de Pahlen, head of the Elkann family and member of the steering committee of the Bilderberg Conferences.
- Matilde Borromeo is married to Prince Antonius zu Fürstenberg.
- Isabella Borromeo is married to Ugo Brachetti Peretti, a manager (oil executive) from a noble family, son of Count Aldo Maria Brachetti Peretti.
- Beatrice Borromeo is a well-known political journalist in Italy. She is married to Pierre Casiraghi, son of Princess Caroline of Hanover.
