= Beatrice Borromeo =

Italian journalist and fashion model (born 1985)

Donna Beatrice Borromeo
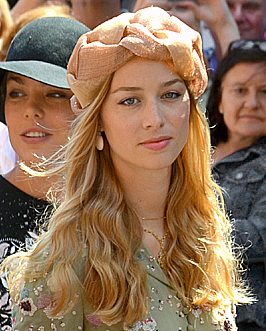
- Borromeo in 2017
- Born: Beatrice Borromeo Arese Taverna; 18 August 1985 (age 41); Innichen, South Tyrol, Italy
- Other name: Beatrice Casiraghi
- Education: Bocconi University; Columbia University
- Occupations: Journalist, documentarian, special envoy for human rights
- Spouse: Pierre Casiraghi (m. 2015)
- Children: 3
- Parents: Carlo Ferdinando Borromeo, Count of Arona (father); Countess Paola Marzotto (mother)
- Family: House of Borromeo

Donna Beatrice Borromeo Arese Taverna (born 18 August 1985) is an Italian journalist, model, and aristocrat. Born into the aristocratic Borromeo family, she studied law and journalism. Borromeo subsequently worked for il Fatto Quotidiano before becoming a columnist for Newsweek and The Daily Beast in 2013. She also worked as a broadcast journalist for AnnoZero on Rai 2, and hosted a weekly show on the Radio 105 Network. Borromeo married Pierre Casiraghi, in 2015; they have three children. She has also been an ambassador for several fashion brands.

== Family background ==
Borromeo is the daughter of Don Carlo Ferdinando Borromeo, Count of Arona (born in 1935), the son of Vitaliano Borromeo, 2nd Prince of Angera, and his long-time companion, Countess Donna Paola Marzotto (born in 1955). Through her father she is related to Charles Borromeo (1538–1584), who became a cardinal of the Catholic Church, Archbishop of Milan, and a canonised saint. The family currently owns most of the Borromean Islands in the Lago Maggiore, and many other estates in the Lombardy and Piedmont countrysides.

Borromeo has an older brother, Carlo Ludovico Borromeo, who is married to Marta Ferri. She has three older half-sisters from her father's marriage to German model and former Miss Germany Marion Sybil Zota: Isabella, married to Count Ugo Brachetti Peretti; Lavinia, married to John Elkann; and Matilde, married to Prince Antonius zu Fürstenberg.

Borromeo's maternal grandmother was the fashion designer Marta Marzotto (née Vacondio), ex-wife of Count Umberto Marzotto. Her uncle, Count Matteo Marzotto, is the former president and director of the Valentino fashion house at the time the label belonged to the Marzotto Group.

== Education ==
She finished secondary education, in 2004, at Milan's Liceo Classico Giovanni Berchet. Borromeo received a bachelor of laws from Bocconi University in Milan in 2010, under supervision of prof. Lorenzo Cuocolo. She received a Masters in Journalism from the Columbia University Journalism School in May 2012.

== Career ==
=== Journalism ===
Beatrice was a contributor to Newsweek and The Daily Beast in 2013. Prior to that, and from the newspaper's beginning in 2009, she worked as a full-time reporter for Il Fatto Quotidiano. She continued in that position through the year 2016. She has appeared on many television shows in Italy, beginning with AnnoZero on Rai 2 where she worked for two years, from 2006 to 2008. Every week she interviewed an average three guests on political development and social evils. In 2009, she even hosted a weekly show on the Radio 105 Network. She interviewed Roberto Saviano, the famous author of Gomorrah, for Above's June 2009 issue. She also interviewed US author of LA Confidential James Ellroy and former candidate for Colombia's presidency Ingrid Betancourt both for Il Fatto Quotidiano. For the same newspaper, she interviewed Marcello Dell'Utri, Italian Senator and co-founder of Forza Italia. In the interview, Dell'Utri admitted to have entered politics to get immunity in order to escape his arrest. Her first article for Il Fatto Quotidiano, published on 14 September 2009, was about Vito De Filippo, then-president of the Italian region of Basilicata, allocating European funds for the Miss Italia contest. She also wrote an article for The Daily Beast published in June 2012 about Italian prosecutor Nicola Gratteri.

Borromeo directed Mamma Mafia, a documentary about mafia women: its preview was released by the Newsweek Daily Beast Company on 31 January 2013. That was her sole film in the English language. She has directed several documentaries in the Italian language, ranging from topics such as the women of 'Ndrangheta, selfie surgery, and the children of Caivano.

Speaking of the children who live in the slums of Caivano, Borromeo said: "These children never get to be children. They live in horror and daily terror and that seems to be normal."

Borromeo collaborated with Marco Travaglio and Vauro Senesi on the book Italia AnnoZero.

She also wrote the preface for Birgit Hamer's Delitto senza castigo: La Vera Storia di Vittorio Emanuele di Savoia. Birgit is a very old family friend whose mother was dear friends with Borromeo's mother, and Borromeo has admitted to having grown up hearing about the murder of Dirk Hamer from his sisters, including Birgit. Borromeo broke the story of the video confession of Vittorio Emanuele, who subsequently sued the newspaper for defamation. In 2015 a court ruled in favour of the newspaper. Borromeo then posted on Twitter: "Vincere una causa è sempre piacevole, ma contro Vittorio Emanuele di Savoia la goduria è doppia!" ("Winning a case is always nice, but against Victor Emmanuel of Savoy the pleasure is double"), which resulted in a spat on social media with his son Emanuele Filiberto. Borromeo directed an Italian-language documentary on the incident which released on Netflix in July 2023.

=== Fashion and modelling ===
Beatrice began modelling in 2000, when she was 15 years old. Her mother entrusted her to her friend Piero Piazzi, who worked at the Tomei modelling agency; he managed and launched her career as a model. She then walked for brands such as Chanel, Valentino, Trussardi, as well as becoming the face of Blumarine. In March 2021, Borromeo was announced as 2021 Dior ambassador.

== Personal life ==
Since 2008, Borromeo became increasingly known in the tabloid press as the girlfriend of Pierre Casiraghi, the younger son of Caroline, Princess of Hanover. The couple married in a civil ceremony on Saturday, 25 July 2015 in the gardens of the Prince's Palace of Monaco. The religious ceremony took place on 1 August 2015 on Isolino di San Giovanni, one of the Borromean Islands on Lake Maggiore, Italy. Pierre and Beatrice's first child, Stefano Ercole Carlo, was born on 28 February 2017. Their second child, Francesco Carlo Albert, was born on 21 May 2018. Their third child and only daughter, Bianca Caroline Marta, was born on 4 October 2025.

In November 2015 she was sanctioned Special Envoy for Human Rights for F4D.

In 2005, she considered herself an "atheist and leftist".

== Publications ==
- Senesi, Vauro; Travaglio, Marco; Borromeo, Beatrice (2009). Italia Anno Zero [Italy, Year Zero] (in Italian). Milan: Chiarelettere. ISBN 978-88-619-0051-6.
- Hamer, Birgit (2011). Borromeo, Beatrice (ed.). Delitto senza castigo: la vera storia di Vittorio Emanuele di Savoia [Crime without Punishment: the True Story of Vittorio Emanuele of Savoy] (in Italian). Reggio Emilia: Aliberti. ISBN 978-88-7424-735-6.

== See also ==
- House of Borromeo
- Federico Borromeo
- Borromean islands
- Borromean rings
