= Amical =

Amical may refer to:

- AMICAL Consortium, an association of American-style universities outside America
- Amical Club Marie Galante, a football club in Guadeloupe
- Amicale F.C., a football club in Vanuatu
