= Ginta =

Ginta may refer to:

- Ginta (Hunter × Hunter), a fictional character from the manga series Hunter × Hunter
- Ginta, a fictional character from the manga series Inuyasha
- Ginta Lapiņa (born 1989), a Latvian model
- Ginta Suou, a fictional character from the manga series Marmalade Boy
- Ginta Toramizu, a fictional character from the manga series MÄR
