= Peretta =

Peretta may refer to:

- Rômulo Peretta (born 1996), Brazilian footballer
- Peretta Peronne, unlicensed female surgeon operating in Paris who was prosecuted by the Parisian medical faculty in 1411
- Peretta, a Sardinian cheese - see List of Italian cheeses

== See also ==
- Perretta, a surname
- Peretti, a surname
