= Cannobino =

- The Cannobino near Cannobio

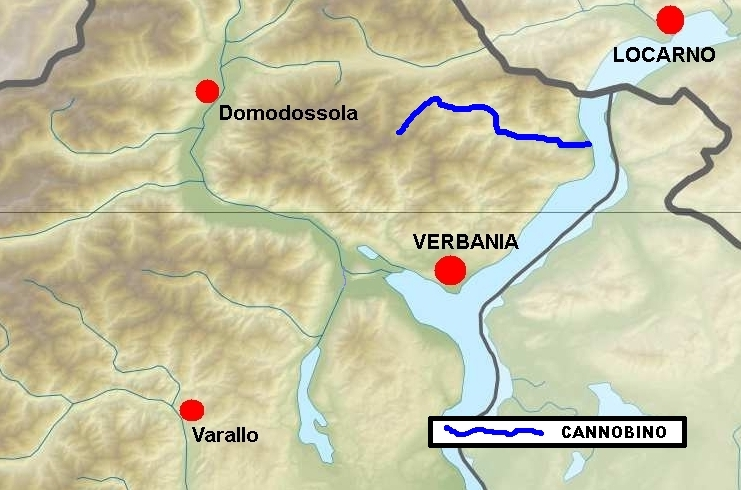

Location
- Country: Italy

Physical characteristics
- Source
  - location: Cima della Laurasca
- Mouth: Lago Maggiore
  - coordinates: 46°04′10″N 8°41′54″E
  - elevation: 193 m (633 ft)
- Length: 25 km (16 mi)

Basin features
- Progression: Lake Maggiore→ Ticino→ Po→ Adriatic Sea

The Cannobino is a little river or stream located in the province of Verbano Cusio Ossola in the region of Piedmont in the north of Italy, which by the local population often is simply called 'Il Fiume' (the river).

== Basin ==
The Cannobino rises on the slopes of the Italian Alps near the Cima della Laurasca, elevation 2,195 metres (7,201 ft), and meanders through the Cannobino valley (in Italian 'Valle Cannobina'). The first 20 kilometres (12 mi) of the stream is not wider than some 10 metres (33 ft), but next to the church of Sant'Anna in the villages of Traffiume the water flows through a cleft that is many meters deep and ends up in a natural basin a few meters deep and almost 100-metre (330 ft) wide. From here on the stream winds itself through a bed that is more than 50 metres (160 ft) wide through the town of Cannobio to flow into the Lake Maggiore (in Italian 'Lago Maggiore'), elevation 192 metres (630 ft). On this journey, approximately 25 kilometres (16 mi) long, the river crosses the following municipalities: Malesco, Gurro, Valle Cannobina and finally Cannobio.

== Torrente ==
In general the Cannobino is a quietly flowing stream, but a couple of times a year the influx of water from the surrounding mountains suddenly increases strongly, causing the stream to change into a wild watermass. For this reason the Cannobino is called a 'torrente'.

== Recreation ==
The Cannobino is mainly used for recreational purposes. A number of campgrounds and hotels are situated on its banks and near the Sant'Anna cleft the stream is wide and deep enough for diving, swimming and sailing rubber boats.
