= Ginta Lapiņa =

Latvian fashion model (born 1989)

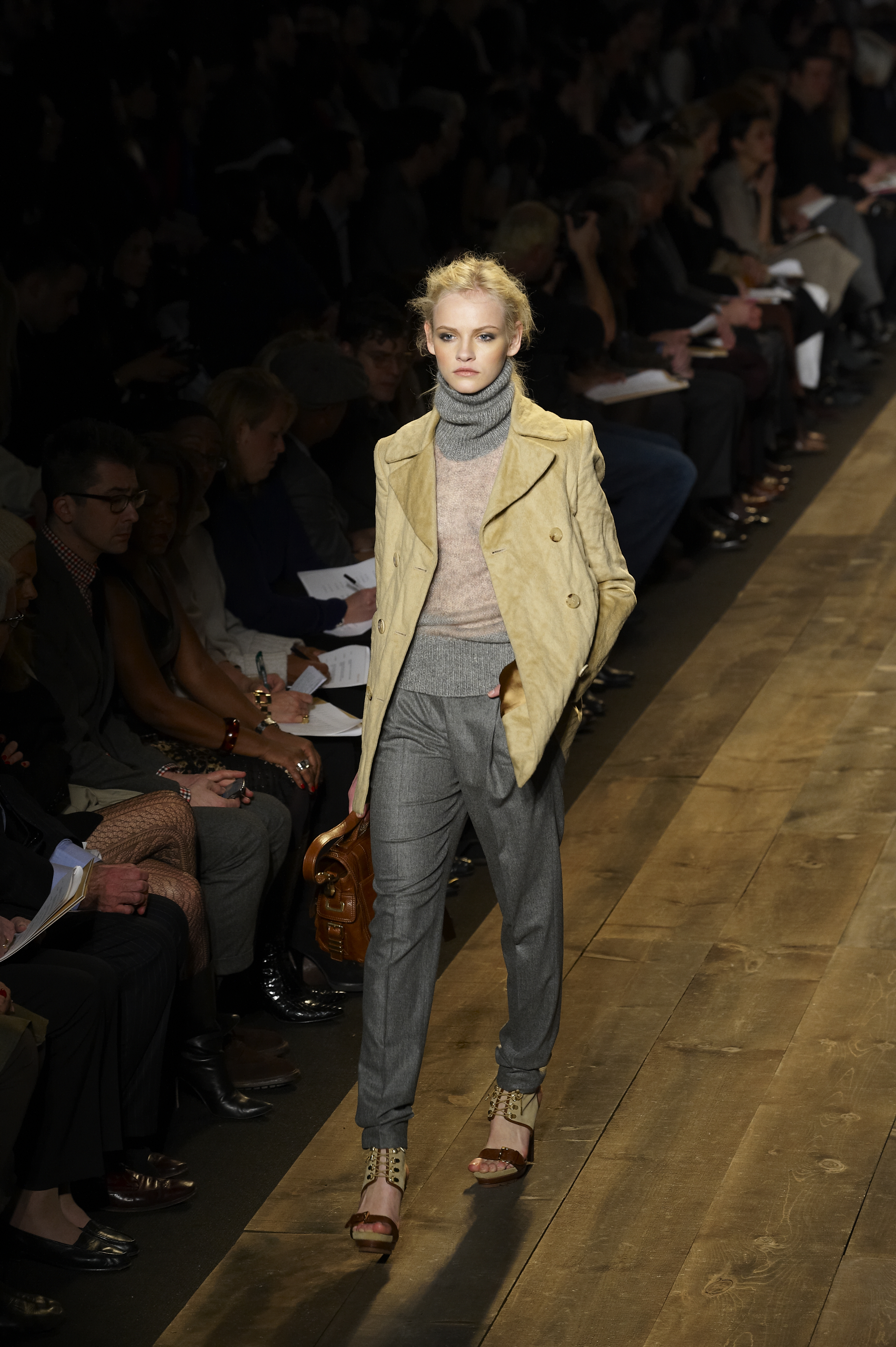
- Lapiņa in 2010, walking for Michael Kors
- Born: 30 June 1989 (age 37); Riga, Latvia SSR, Soviet Union (now Latvia)
- Spouses: Adam Hock (m. 2012; div. 2017) Bryant Knight (m. 2020)
- Children: 1
- Modeling information
- Hair color: Blonde
- Eye color: Blue
- Agency: New York Models (New York); VIVA Model Management (Paris, London, Barcelona); Women Management (Milan); UNIQUE DENMARK (Copenhagen); Modellink (Gothenburg)

Ginta Lapiņa Knight (born 30 June 1989) is a Latvian model. She slowly began her career in 2005 after being scouted on a street in her home country, with her career kicking off in 2009. Lapiņa belongs to the "Wide Eyed Doll" era of models, along with Vlada Roslyakova, Gemma Ward, Sasha Pivovarova and Jessica Stam. She's considered to be the "final doll face" model of the first decade of the 2000s.

== Career ==
Lapiņa was born in Riga, and raised in Aizkraukles and began her modeling career in 2005, after being scouted in Riga by Nils Raumanis, and after placed with MC2 Model Management in New York City. Her first modeling job was for teen clothing brand dElia*s and her runway debut was at the Spring 2008 New York Fashion Week in the Benjamin Cho show. In 2008 she signed with the Women Management modeling agency. In 2010, Lapiņa opened the Versace Spring/Summer 2011 show, and was featured in the resort catalog that same season.

Lapiņa was sued by Women Management for alleged breach of contract when she switched to DNA Model Management, but the Manhattan Supreme Court ruled in her favor. She had countersued the company when she was deceived into doing an ad for German haircare brand Schwarzkopf without full compensation rather than working for Karl Lagerfeld as she was led to believe.

Lapiņa has walked in shows for many notable designers including Shiatzy Chen, Anna Sui, Nina Ricci, Marc Jacobs, Dolce & Gabbana, Prada, Rodarte, Proenza Schouler, Oscar de la Renta, Diane von Furstenberg, Vivienne Westwood, Miu Miu, Yves Saint Laurent, Carolina Herrera, Bottega Veneta, Versace, Versus (Versace), Valentino, and Louis Vuitton. She has been photographed in Vogue, Marie Claire, Numéro, Harper's Bazaar, Dazed & Confused, W, and on the covers of Velvet and Elle France, among others.

Lapiņa has been in advertisements for YSL Beauté, NARS, Jill Stuart, Anna Sui, John Galliano, Marc by Marc Jacobs, Sportmax, Uniqlo, Derek Lam, DKNY, Sportmax, and in the Miu Miu Fall/Winter 2010 campaign. In 2010, she was ranked 27th on the Top 50 Models Women List by models.com.

== Personal life ==
Lapiņa has been married to entrepreneur Bryant Knight since 2020, and they have a son together.

She currently lives in Los Angeles, California and she has a podcast called 'The Extra Stitch' alongside Maryna Linchuk.
