= The Trip (1999 TV series) =

- Country of origin: United Kingdom
- Original language: English
- No. of series: 2
- No. of episodes: 16 (8 per season)

Original release
- Network: Channel 4
- Release: 1999

The Trip is an eight-part Channel 4 television series that was first broadcast in 1999 (during the late night time bracket known as 4Later). The Trip consists of rarely seen NASA space footage from the earliest days of space exploration to the 1990s, set to a dance music soundtrack. The show was created by producer Jacques Peretti.

A CD soundtrack for the series was released by Shifty Disco on 22 March 1999, containing many of the tracks used in the series.

A second series was broadcast in 2001, featuring a wider range of music genres and footage from various sources, rather than NASA space exploration footage. This series has not been made available on Channel 4 4oD.
