= Perretta =

Perretta is a surname. Notable people with the surname include:

- Charlotte Anne Perretta (1942–2015), American judge, first woman to sit on the Massachusetts Appeals Court
- Harry Perretta (born 1955), retired American basketball coach
- Julian Perretta (born 1992), English singer-songwriter and producer
- Ralph Perretta (born 1953), former professional American football player

== See also ==
- Peretta
- Perrette
