= Perrette =

Perrette is a surname and given name. Notable people with the name include:

- Pauley Perrette (born 1969), American actress and singer
- Perrette Pradier (1938–2013), French actress and dubbing director
- Perrette Souplex (born 1930), French actress

== See also ==
- Perretta
