= Marzotto =

Marzotto is a surname. Notable people with the surname include:

- Giannino Marzotto (1928–2012), Italian racing driver and entrepreneur
- Giuseppe Marzotto (born 1944), Italian motorcycle rider
- Paola Marzotto (born 1955), Italian photographer, journalist and fashion designer
- Vittorio Marzotto (1922–1999), Italian racing driver

== See also ==
- Marzotto Group, Italian textile manufacturer
