= Basit Igtet =

Libyan entrepreneur and human-rights activist

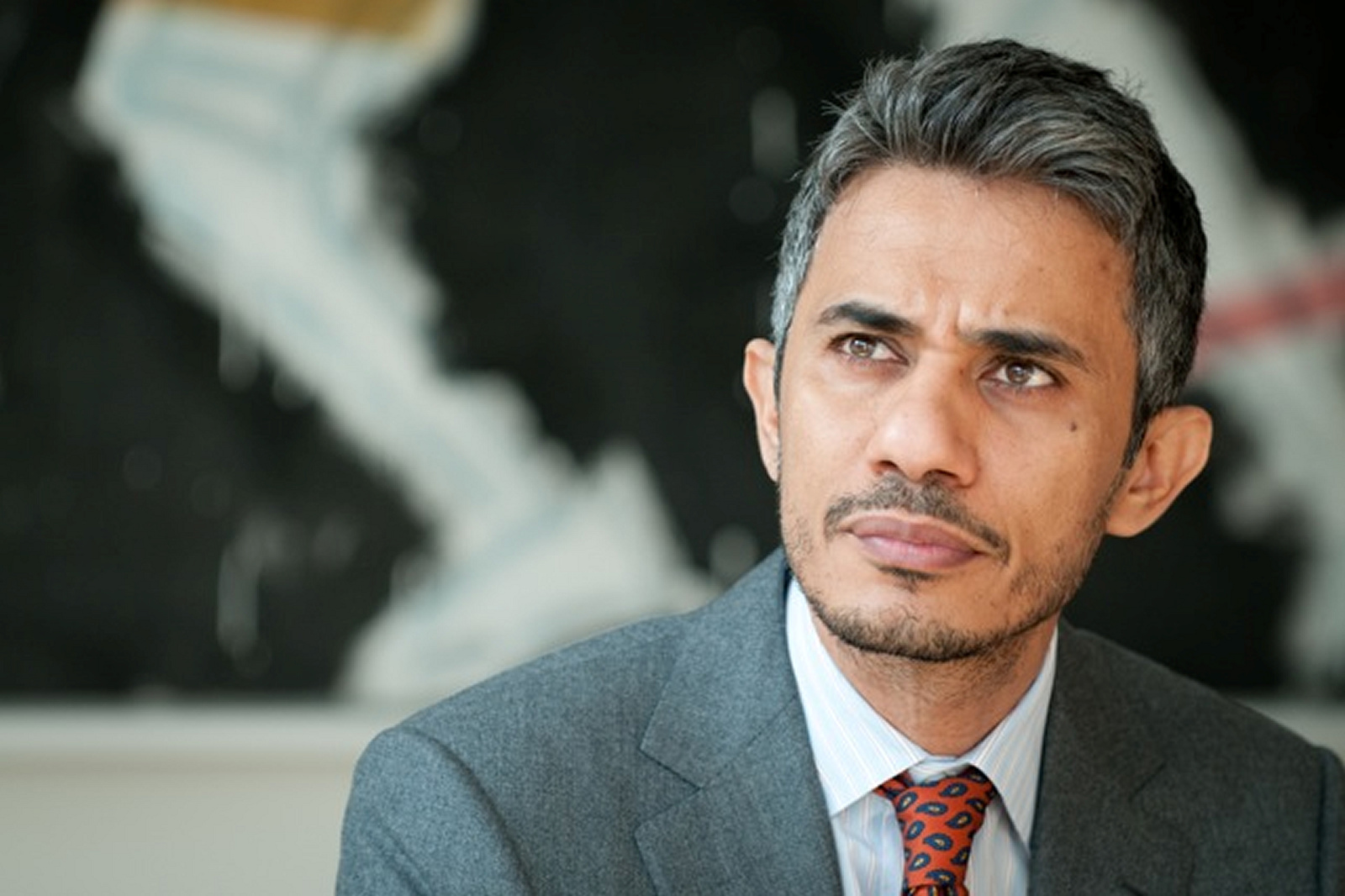
- Born: 24 September 1970 (age 56); Benghazi, Libya
- Spouse: Sara Bronfman
- Children: 2
- Relatives: Edgar Bronfman, Sr. (father-in-law)

Basit Igtet (born 24 September 1970) is a Libyan entrepreneur who has founded several companies in various sectors. In 2011, he worked to support the Libyan revolution through international lobbying and was consequently appointed as a Special Envoy to the Libyan National Transitional Council (NTC) on 4 September 2011.

== Career ==
In 2004, Igtet formed Swiss International Management AG which provides business services to the State of Qatar.

== Work with Libya ==
In 2010, Igtet founded the Independent Libya Foundation (ILF) together with New York-based businessman Adam M. Hock.

In March 2011, he hosted General Abdul Fatah Younis, former Interior Minister of Libya (under the Gaddafi government), turned leader of the rebel armed forces, in the EU capital.

On 14 June 2011, he met with the president of Panama, Ricardo Martinelli, at the Palace of the Herons (Palacio de las Garzas) to lobby for official recognition of the NTC.

On 4 September 2011, Igtet was appointed as Special Envoy to the Libyan National Transitional Council for humanitarian aid from the area of North and South America.

On 19 November 2011, Igtet organized an ILF delegation in Benghazi, Libya to present strategies for rebel re-integration.

== Philanthropy ==
He sponsored one show at La Comédie Française at Paris in 2012.

== Personal life ==
Igtet is married to Sara Bronfman, daughter of billionaire Edgar Bronfman, Sr.; they have one daughter.

== Sources ==
- "ABOUT US". Athal Energy. Archived from the original on 23 September 2015.
