= Nicole Junkermann =

German businesswoman (born 1980)

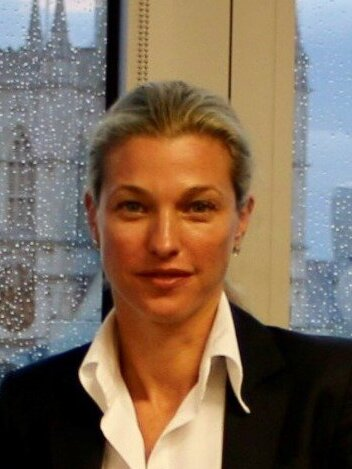
- Junkermann in 2018
- Born: April 27, 1980 (age 46); Düsseldorf, Germany
- Education: International University of Monaco (1998), Harvard Business School (2002)
- Occupations: Entrepreneur; investor
- Years active: 1990s–present
- Spouse: Ferdinando Brachetti Peretti (m. 2017)
- Children: 1

Nicole Junkermann, also known since 2017 as Countess Nicole Brachetti Peretti, (born 27 April 1980) is a German businesswoman and investor with international activities in the sports, healthcare, and technology sectors. As of 2020, she lives in London.

Junkermann is the founder of NJF Holdings, an international investment company with interests in venture capital, private equity, and real estate.

== Early life and education ==
Nicole Junkermann, born in Düsseldorf, is the only daughter of businessman Heinz Junkermann and his wife Ingrid. Her father founded a jewellery store (Schmuck-Kassette GmbH), a real estate company (IFG Gesellschaft für Immobilienbesitz) and a private bank for wealthy clients. He began taking Nicole with him to business meetings when she was 12 in order to prepare her for her future career.

Junkermann grew up in Marbella, Spain and studied business administration and management at the International University of Monaco (receiving a Bachelor's degree in 1998) and at Harvard Business School (studying in its programme for management development in 2002) in the United States.

== Career ==
=== Early ventures ===
Junkermann started her career as a model and she later co-founded the online betting and gaming business Winamax in 1998.

In 2002, Junkermann, as a minority shareholder and the former Adidas CEO Robert Louis-Dreyfus bought Infront Sports & Media following the insolvency of the Kirch media group. By 2011, the company was owned by a group of private investors, including majority shareholder Jacobs Holding, the Junkermann Group, and Dr. Martin Steinmeyer, with Philippe Blatter, nephew of then-FIFA president Sepp Blatter, serving as chairman and president. The company acquired the rights to the 2006 FIFA World Cup in Germany and, in 2011, obtained permission to market the television rights for the 2018 and 2022 FIFA World Cups in Asian markets. The company was subsequently sold to private equity group Bridgepoint Capital in a transaction valued at approximately $600 million.

=== NJF Holdings and NJF Capital ===
Shortly after the sale of Infront in 2012, Junkermann founded NJF Holdings. Its venture capital arm, NJF Capital ("Nicole Junkermann Finance Capital"), is registered in the British Virgin Islands and headquartered in London. The fund manages a diversified portfolio with investments across healthcare, biotech, sports, fintech, and deep tech.

Three of NJF's early investments include Songza, Dollar Shave Club, and RelateIQ, which were acquired by Google, Unilever, and Salesforce, respectively. Junkermann's approach in NJF Capital has been to bridge traditional and emerging technologies which has created a portfolio of unicorn companies. Through these investments, she has participated in projects alongside prominent figures such as Google co-founder Eric Schmidt and PayPal co-founder Peter Thiel. Her current stakes include high-profile companies like Revolut, SpaceX, Rippling, and Lendable.

In the healthcare and technology sectors, Junkermann has backed Owkin in 2020, a Paris-based AI startup that uses machine learning for medical and biological research; she serves on its board of directors. She has also invested in media companies, including the photo agency Magnum Photos in 2017. She is part of the board of the cybersecurity investment fund created by Pablo Casado in 2024.

Another investment and advisory board role by Junkermann was in the cybersecurity company Carbyne (formerly Reporty), co-founded in 2014 by former Israeli Prime Minister Ehud Barak, which offered technology for user communication with emergency services. Her firm was part of the company's initial Series A funding, and she joined its advisory board in 2017. In November 2025, Axon Enterprise (formerly TASER International) acquired Carbyne for $625 million.

Junkermann is also the founder of Gameday by NJF Holdings, a dedicated sports and media investment platform focused on leagues, content, and technology. Through Gameday, she became the largest shareholder in Italy's professional women's volleyball league, Lega Pallavolo Serie A Femminile (LVF), and invested in CayoTV, a sports streaming platform based in Spain.

=== Other ===
Junkermann has been a committee member of the Tate Americas Foundation, a charity that supports the work of the Tate Gallery in the United Kingdom, since 2005. Junkermann previously served on the HealthTech Advisory Board appointed in 2018 by Matt Hancock, MP, to advise him in his role as Health Secretary of the United Kingdom.

In 2021, Handelsblatt named Junkermann among the "100 Frauen, die Deutschland voranbringen" (100 Women Advancing Germany).

Junkermann was appointed a trustee of the Royal Marsden Cancer Charity as well as the Royal Academy Trust. She was a visiting professor at Lancaster University. She stepped down from or was terminated from these positions following evidence that she had longstanding affectionate personal relationship with the child sex offender Jeffrey Epstein.

== Personal life ==
Junkermann had long-running personal as well as professional relationship and extensive correspondence with the wealthy child sex offender Jeffrey Epstein. Her correspondence with Epstein had an unusually affectionate tone, included discussion of personal gifts, continued after his 2008 conviction for procuring a child for prostitution, and lasted until the year of his death in 2019. A spokesperson for Junkermann later said she considered his crimes "appalling" and that she had been "completely deceived and misled by him and deeply regrets their conversations regarding personal and professional matters".

In 2017, she married Ferdinando Brachetti Peretti (born 1960), an Italian count, with whom she has a daughter. She lived in Monaco until her marriage, and thereafter in London.

Junkermann speaks German, English, French, Italian and Spanish. As of 2018, she lived in South Kensington, London.
