= American University of Rome =

University in Rome, Italy

The American University of Rome
- Seal of The American University of Rome
- Motto: "Inter Gentes Trans Orbem"
- Motto in English: "Between Peoples Across the World"
- Type: Private university
- Established: 1969
- President: Scott Sprenger
- Students: 900
- Location: Rome, Italy; 41.8857°N 12.4623°E
- Campus: Urban
- Language: English
- Colors: Green & silver
- Nicknames: AUR Wolves (men's); AUR She-Wolves (women's)
- Mascot: Wolfie
- Website: www.aur.edu/

The American University of Rome (AUR) is a private American university in Rome, Italy. It was founded in 1969, making it the oldest American-accredited university in Italy, and it offers undergraduate degrees, graduate degrees, and study abroad programs to English-speaking students from around the globe. The university has over 900 students representing more than 60 nationalities. The university campus is located near the center of Rome on the Janiculum hill in the Monteverde Vecchio neighborhood. The language of instruction is English.

== History ==
AUR has its origins soon after World War II. David Colin, an American journalist in Italy prior to and during the war, settled in Rome. While American students and professors visited Rome, Colin helped foster cultural exchanges between Americans and their Italian counterparts. Over time, informal discussions at his home became more formalized, turning into structured lectures and classes. His wife, Joan Carpenter, assisted Colin with this undertaking.

George Tesoro, an Italian who left Italy in 1940 in protest against Mussolini's fascist regime, began to collaborate with Colin. As the program grew, The American University in Rome became reality when AUR was incorporated in 1969 in the District of Columbia with its academic headquarters located in Rome, Italy.

=== Later development ===
Upon incorporation, Tesoro served as chairman until 1983, when Joseph D. Ventura, then vice chair, succeeded him. During Ventura's time as chairman, the board of trustees became a degree-granting institution from the District of Columbia in 1986. In 1987, a member of the board, Dr. Margaret Giannini, a professional in the scientific and medical research field, became board chair and served until 2003. Under her 16 years of leadership, the university grew in its student and faculty numbers, curriculum offerings, and financial and management systems. Dr. Giannini initiated AUR's first accreditation with the Accrediting Council of Independent Colleges and Schools in 1992 and planted the seeds for Middle States accreditation.

After operating from different locations in central Rome for almost 25 years, AUR moved to its current campus in 1993.

== Campus ==
The campus is located on top of the Janiculum, Rome's highest hill, offering views of the city. Most of its buildings are located on Via Pietro Roselli adjacent to a portion of the Aurelian Wall. The campus was extended in early 2018 to include an Art Studio, exhibition space and classrooms on via Angelo Masina. This building is adjacent to, and shares garden space with, the American Academy in Rome.

The main campus includes two gardens centered around the main A and B buildings, the Evans Hall Library, and the Auriana Auditorium. The main teaching block (Building B) is part of a Barnabite monastery.

In 2025, the university announced a major expansion and renewal of its campus.

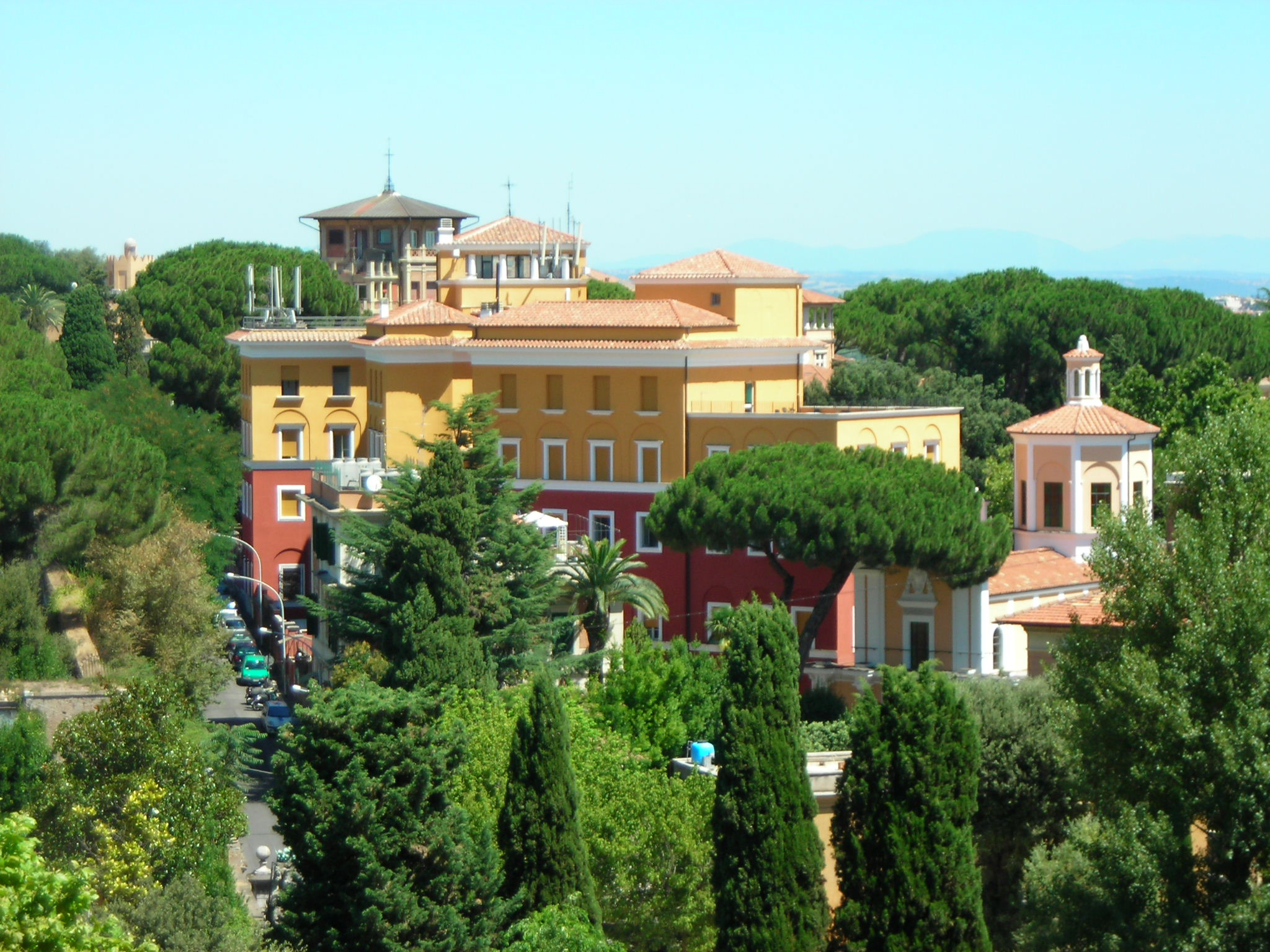
View of AUR main campus A and B buildings

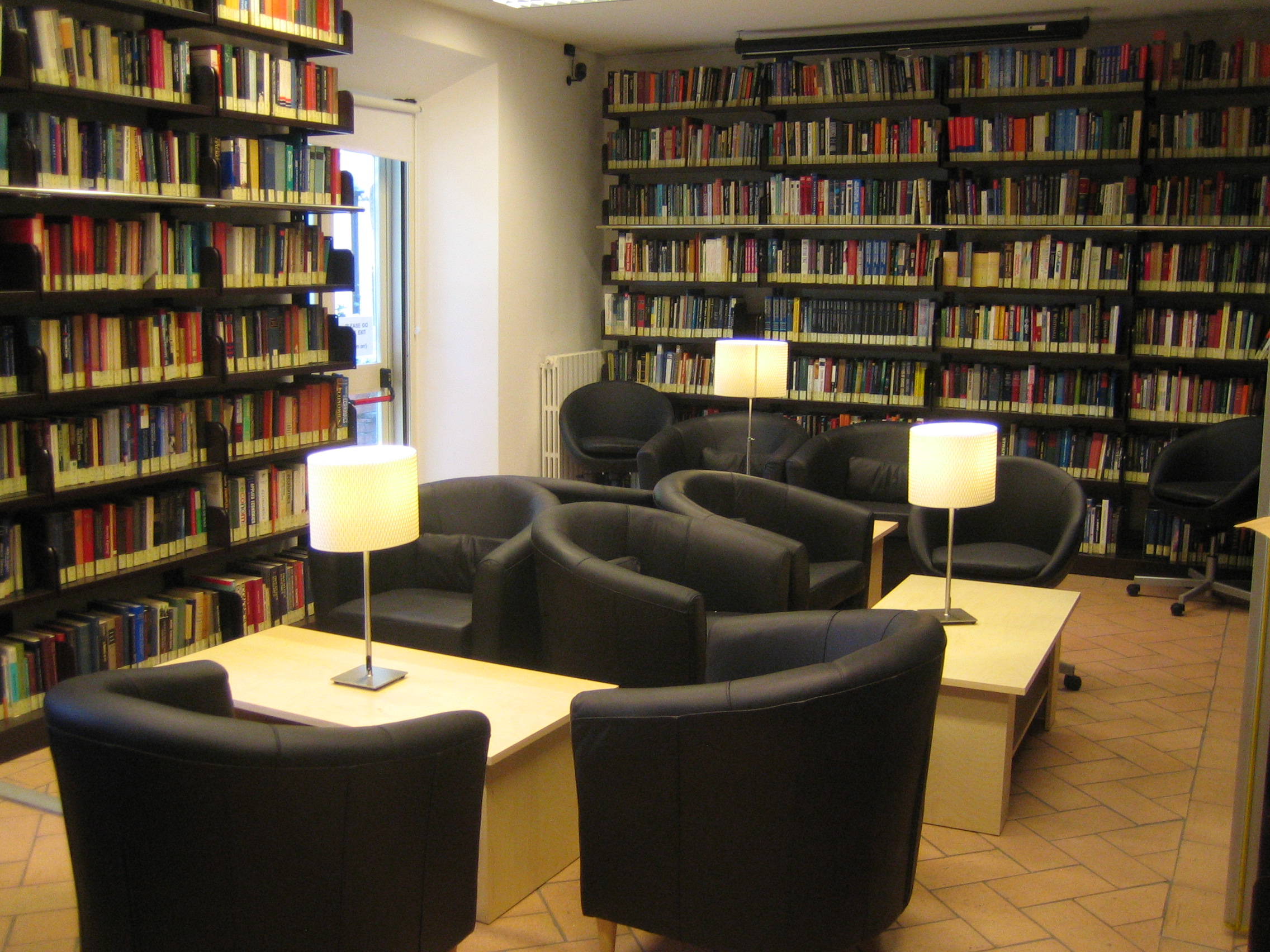
Photo of an Evans Hall Library Study Room

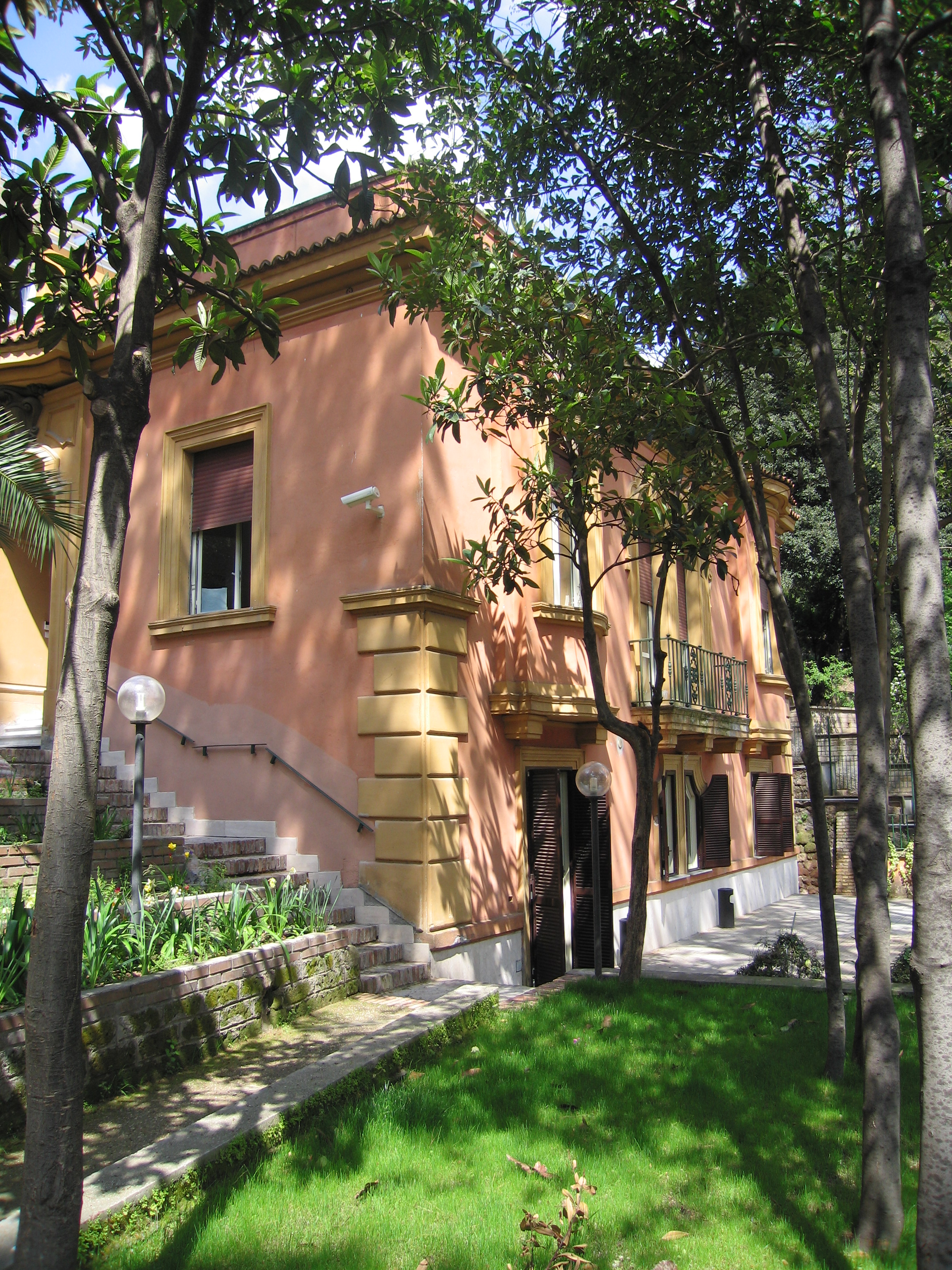
AUR Evans Hall Library view from outside

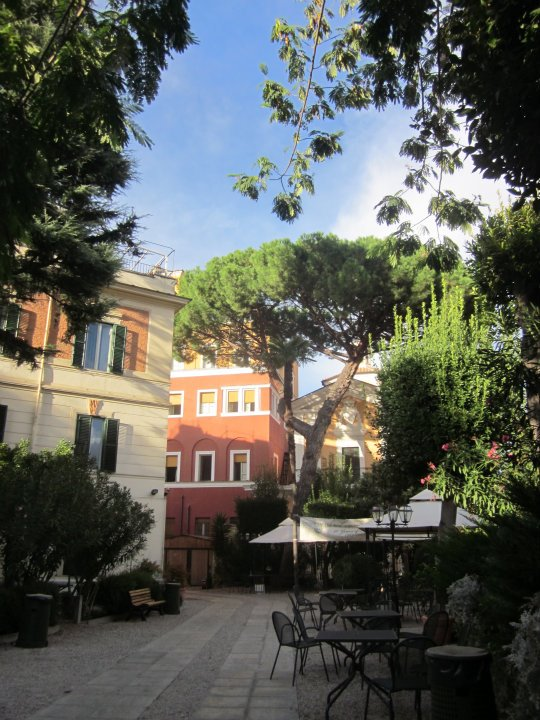
AUR Main Garden

== Organisation and administration ==
The American University of Rome is governed a board of trustees, president, and a senate. The highest governing body, the board of trustees, is responsible for overseeing the university and maintaining its academic and financial health and welfare. The board of trustees includes Joseph Gulino, an international securities lawyer and managing partner at DRRT. Among other duties, the board appoints the president and has final approval of changes to the curriculum proposed by the AUR Senate (the body which, forms and amends academic policies and includes a student government representative).

The current president of the university is Dr. Scott Sprenger who assumed the position in July 2020, taking over from Dr. Richard Hodges OBE, who was named President Emeritus & Professor Emeritus upon completing his tenure.

AUR is a member of the Association of American International Colleges and Universities and The American International Consortium of Academic Libraries (AMICAL).

== Academics ==
The American University of Rome is a liberal arts university with a student-faculty ratio of roughly 16:1. AUR's undergraduate student body of roughly 500 students is multicultural and representative of over 30 nationalities.

=== Accreditation ===
The American University of Rome is regionally accredited by the Middle States Commission on Higher Education, which is an institutional accrediting agency recognized by the U.S. Secretary of Education and the Council for Higher Education Accreditation. The American University of Rome is licensed by the Department of Education of the State of Delaware to award associate, bachelor's and master's degrees. In Italy, AUR is registered as a legal entity with the Rome Tribunal and it is authorized to operate in Italy by the Ministry of Education, Universities and Research.

=== Academic programs ===
AUR offers three master's degrees (in Peace Studies, Sustainable Cultural Heritage and Food Studies) and eleven bachelor's degree programs with 16 concentrations or tracks, two associate degree programs, and eighteen minors.

== Student life ==
Students live off-campus mostly near the university, giving the opportunity to allow the students to immerse in the surrounding communities.

The AUR community of students and faculty publishes a literary journal of student works called Remus each year. AUR student run organisations include Student Government and a variety of clubs such as: Veterans Club, Business Club, Communication Club, Culture Club, Italian Studies Club, and International Relations Club which also organises AUR's Harvard National Model United Nations delegation. The Communication club also supports AUR's Communication Week which is a showcase of the American University of Rome students communications and English work.

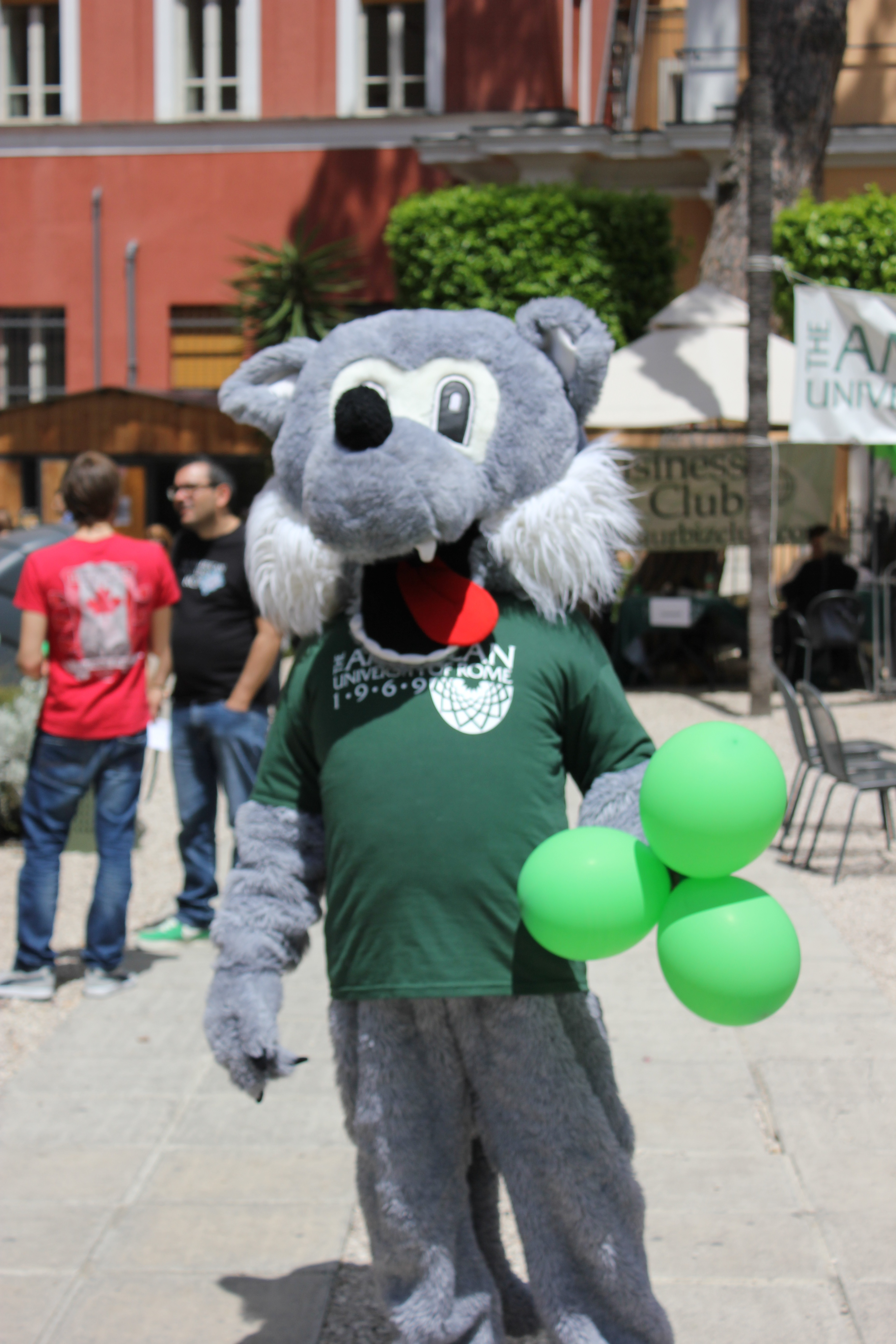
The American University of Rome's mascot "Wolfie"

=== Athletics ===
The Wolves and She-Wolves are the American University of Rome's soccer clubs which play competitively against Rome's other universities including La Sapienza and Roma Tre University. Both AUR's men's and women's teams were founding members of their respective intercollegiate tournaments; the men's "Campionato di Calcio delle Università Romane" (2005) and the women's "Campionato Calcio Feminile delle Università Romane" in 2006.

AUR Wolves, men's soccer team, won the Universities of Rome a5 Football Championship on April 26, 2018, their first trophy since co-founding the league in 2005.

In 2013, the university added volleyball as a competitive team and became a founding member in the newly created co-ed tournament, "Campionato di Volley delle Università Romane"

==== Mascot ====
The school mascot is "Wolfie". The first mascot in Roman university athletics, Wolfie has been representing AUR since 2006. Originally named "Romulus" in reference to the mythical founder of Rome, the name Wolfie was popularized by students and later formally adopted.

== American University of Rome Abroad (AURA) ==
The American University of Rome hosts a number of study abroad students but also promotes the opportunity for resident students to study abroad from AUR using the AURA program.

== Notable scholars ==
- Parker W. Borg
- Andrea di Robilant
- Bjorn Thomassen
- James Walston

== Notable alumni ==
- Jill Elizabeth Cooper - American-born Italian TV personality and author
- Marwan Moussa - Egyptian rapper
- Ugo Brachetti Peretti - Italian oil executive, chairman of Gruppo API
- Evy Poumpouras - American journalist and author
- Ece Vahapoğlu - Turkish author, television host, and journalist

== See also ==
- American University (disambiguation) for a list of similarly named institutions
