= Matilde Borromeo =

Italian equestrian

Princess Matilde zu Fürstenberg
- Born: Countess Matilde dei Principi Borromeo Arese Taverna; 8 August 1983 (age 42); Milan, Italy
- Spouse: Prince Antonius zu Fürstenberg (m. 2011)
- Issue: Prince Karl Egon; Prince Alexander
- House: Borromeo (by birth); Fürstenberg (by marriage)
- Father: Carlo Ferdinando Borromeo, Count of Arona
- Mother: Marion Sybil Zota
- Occupation: equestrian

Princess Matilde zu Fürstenberg (born Donna Matilde dei Principi Borromeo Arese Taverna; 8 August 1983) is an Italian equestrian and horse breeder. She is a member of the House of Borromeo, an Italian noble family with historic ties to the Catholic Church and the Duchy of Milan. Through her marriage to Prince Antonius zu Fürstenberg she is a member of the German House of Fürstenberg. Matilde Borromeo has competed in international equestrian competitions representing Italy.

== Early life ==
Matilde Borromeo was born on 8 August 1983 in Milan, Italy. She is the third daughter of Carlo Ferdinando Borromeo, Count of Arona and Marion Sybil Zota. She is sister of Donna Lavinia Borromeo (wife of John Elkann) and Donna Isabella Borromeo (wife of Ugo Brachetti Peretti). She is half-sister of Beatrice Borromeo, who married into the Monegasque princely family (daughter-in-law of Princess Caroline of Monaco), and Carlo Ludovico Borromeo, husband of Italian fashion designer Marta Ferri. Her paternal grandfather was Vitaliano Borromeo, Prince of Angera.

== Career ==
Matilde Borromeo began working on her family's farm in Lomellina after she got her degree in breeding and animal welfare at the University of Milan. She works in the daily industry and she started breeding show-jumping horses in 2006. Shortly after she began competing in the equestrian circuit, riding horses she raised on her own. She has competed international events. She has competed at the Global Champions Tour, Master of Paris, Master of Verona, and at the Piazza di Siena. Representing Italy, she has placed second in Monte Carlo, first in Tortona, second in Verona, and first in Truccazzano. She ranked ninth on the first and second days and tenth on the third day in the CIS first class grand prix at the Milano Winter Show. In 2015, Matilde Borromeo served as chief ambassador for the Milano Winter Show and Fiera Verona Cavalli.

== Personal life ==
On 11 June 2011 Borromeo married Antonius zu Fürstenberg, the youngest son of Heinrich Fürst zu Fürstenberg, at Isola Bella, one of the Borromean Islands in Lake Maggiore owned by the Borromeo family. They have two children, Karl Egon and Alexander.

In February 2019 it was reported that Borromeo and Antonius had separated.
