= Cannobio =

- Comune
- Comune di Cannobio

- Coat of arms

- Location within Italy Location within Piedmont
- Coordinates: 46°04′N 08°42′E
- Country: Italy
- Region: Piedmont
- Province: Verbano-Cusio-Ossola (VB)
- Frazioni: Campeglio, Carmine Inferiore, Carmine Superiore, Cinzago, Formine, Marchille, Piaggio Valmara, Pianoni, Ronco, San Bartolomeo Valmara, Sant'Agata, Socraggio, Socragno, Traffiume

Government
  - Mayor: Gianmaria Minazzi (Lista Civica)

Area
  - Total: 51 km^{2} (20 sq mi)
- Elevation: 214 m (702 ft)

Population (30 June 2019)
  - Total: 5,117
  - Density: 100/km^{2} (260/sq mi)
- Demonym: Cannobiesi
- Time zone: UTC+1 (CET)
  - Summer (DST): UTC+2 (CEST)
- Dialing code: 0323
- Patron saint: SS Pietà and St. Victor
- Website: www.cannobio.net

Cannobio is a town and comune on the river Cannobino and the shore of Lago Maggiore in Piedmont, Italy.

== History ==
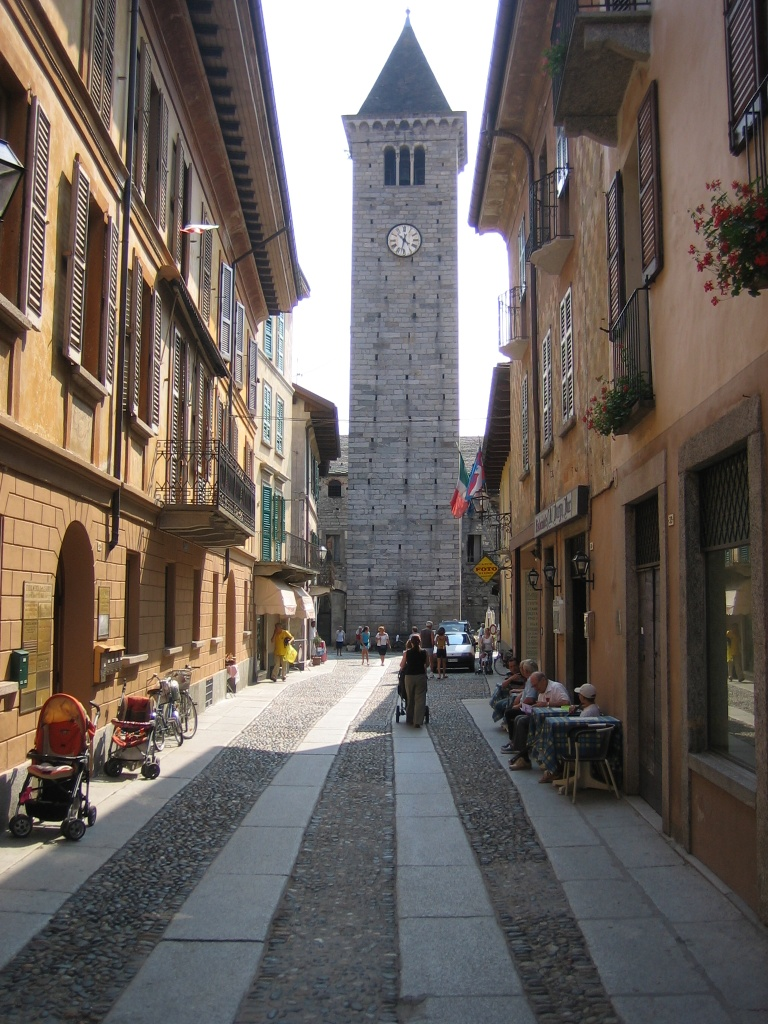
The main street A. Giovanola

The local inhabitants probably became subject to Roman rule by the time of the emperor Augustus. Sarcophagi from the 2nd–3rd century CE have been found and conserved in the "Palazzo della Ragione".

The first documented mention of Cannobio dates to 909. During medieval times, the town became a center for wool and tanning industries, as well as the lumber trade. Cannobio was named as a village by 1207, and was granted administrative autonomy. The Palazzo della Ragione was constructed by 1291 under the government of the podestà Ugolino da Mandello.

Cannobio was assigned to the archdiocese of Milan and from 1817 was under the authority of the bishop of Novara. Its "pieve" comprised the areas of Cannobina, Cannero, Brissago and several areas on the eastern side of the lake. The church of St. Vittore, already present in 1076, and with a bell tower from the 13th century, was completely rebuilt between 1733 and 1749. Autonomous rule for the community of Cannobio and its valley came about in 1342, with the spontaneous submission to Luchino and Giovanni Visconti, lords of Milan. From then on, its administration remained closely connected to that of the Duchy of Milan.

In 1522 a painting of the Virgin Mary allegedly started bleeding. Shortly after this apparition, a plague swept through the area devastating lakeside and valley towns and villages, but leaving Cannobio relatively unscathed. Religious minds linked these two events and Cardinal Charles Borromeo ordered a chapel to be built to hold the painting which is still there today.

The economy went through a renewal in the 15th and 16th centuries. The built-up area spread from the original nucleus (the village) down towards the lake. Large residences were built including the Omacini and Pironi palaces.

During the Risorgimento the town repelled an Austrian attack from the lake (27–28 May 1859) and was visited by Giuseppe Garibaldi in 1862. The opening of the lakeside road to the Swiss border in 1863 created favorable conditions for the arrival of factories, including silk mills.

In 1927 the territory of the comune of Cannobio was extended to incorporate some small villages in the vicinity (Traffiume, Sant’Agata, San Bartolomeo). During the Second World War the people of Cannobio rose up against the Nazi and fascist regime, from 2 to 9 September 1944, and proclaimed the Republic of the Ossola. Since the end of the war the community has undergone further changes. From 1995 the town has come within the Province of Verbano-Cusio-Ossola.

== Geography ==
=== Climate ===
According to the Köppen climate classification, Cannobio experiences a mid-latitude humid subtropical climate (Cfa).

Climate data for Canobbio (1951-1980)
Month	Jan	Feb	Mar	Apr	May	Jun	Jul	Aug	Sep	Oct	Nov	Dec	Year
Average precipitation mm	68	85	114	160	179	181	158	209	204	203	185	82	1,830
Average precipitation inches	2.7	3.3	4.5	6.3	7.0	7.1	6.2	8.2	8.0	8.0	7.3	3.2	72.0
Source: www.isprambiente.gov.it

== Main sights ==
Traffiume and the stream of Cannobino

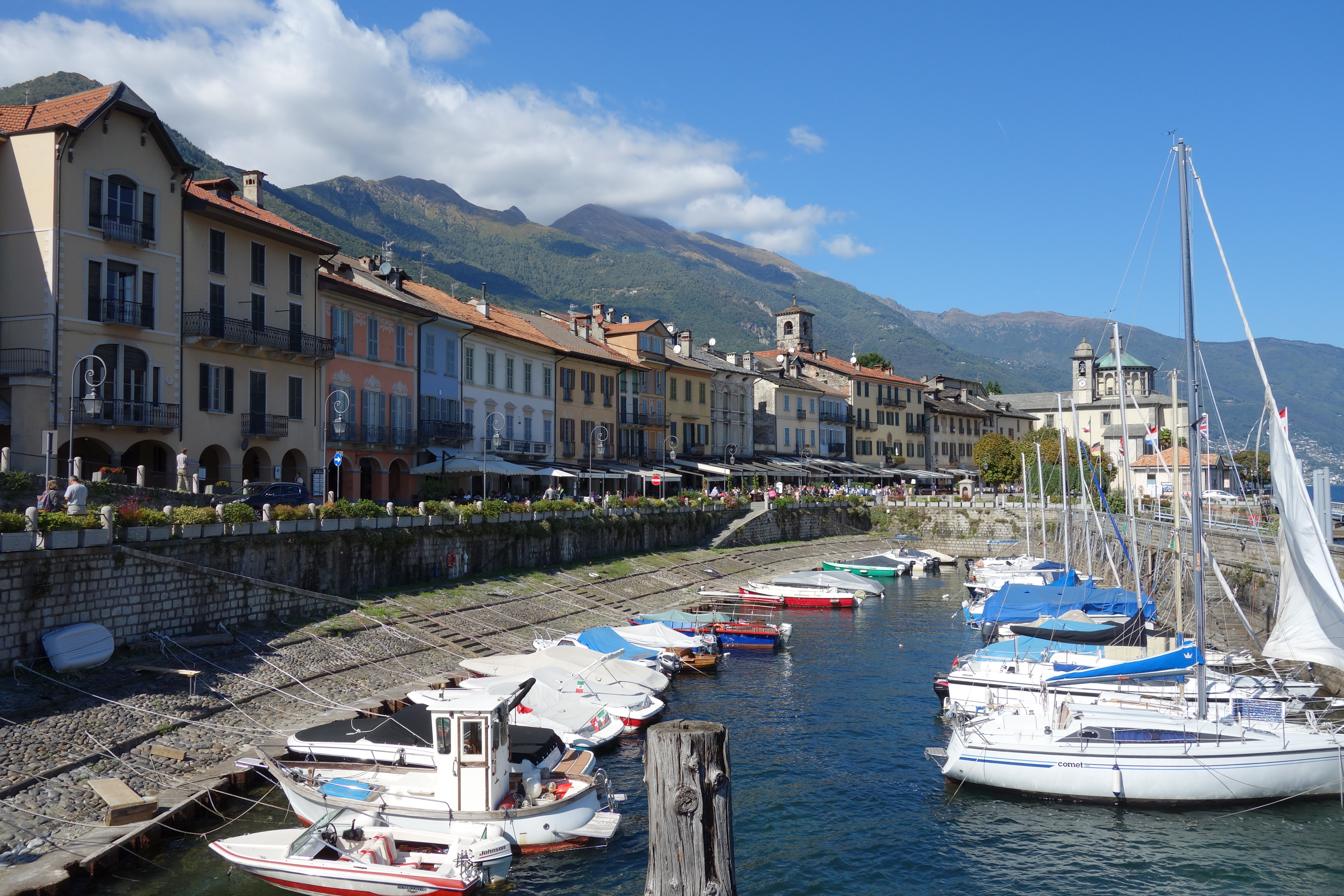
Marina with the panorama of Cannobio

The large lakefront piazza named after King Victor Emmanuel III was given a major refurbishment when in the winter of 2003–04 it was completely relaid in cobblestones and granite slabs. Also added was of a set of wide flagstone steps down to the lake, where people may sit and watch the lake steamers come and go from the landing stages nearby, and the sailing boats and wind-surfers skimming across the lake.

Some of the buildings both on the lakefront and further back in the old part of town date back over 600 years, from when Cannobio was a renowned smuggling town, and most of these have been restored in fine style.

From one, Giuseppe Garibaldi addressed the people of Cannobio in 1859, and on another stands a plaque celebrating an important event in Cannobio in 1627. Each building is painted a different colour, creating a traditional Italian port scene. To one side of the Piazza is Cannobio’s old harbour, which houses the sailing, rowing and speedboats belonging to the locals.

The Santuario della Pietà church commemorates the events of 1522, when a painting of the Virgin Mary was believed to have bled. With its open dome it stands by the lakeside. The painting itself is now housed in another church in the town, and though it is not removed itself, a "Sacra Costa", representing the painting, is processed through the streets on 7 January every year.

Cannobio has its own "Lido" at the north end of town with a large sandy beach. The beach has a European Union Blue Flag for its cleanliness and facilities.
