= Unione Petrolifera =

Italian trade association

Unione Petrolifera (UP), renamed Unione Energie per la Mobilità (UNEM) in 2020, is the Italian trade association representing major companies operating in Italy in the refining and distribution of fuels, lubricants, and other petroleum-derived products.

UNEM represents 89 companies, including both full members and associate members.

The association's president is Gianni Murano. UNEM is affiliated with Confindustria (the General Confederation of Italian Industry).

== History ==
Headquartered in Rome, the association was founded in 1948 to represent the sector's economic interests before institutional bodies and to handle technical matters common to industry companies. This includes liaison with public authorities, regulatory entities, and other representative organizations in the economic and labor spheres.

== Members ==
UNEM's membership includes the principal companies in Italy's petroleum sector:

- Italian multinationals: notably Saras and Eni
- Foreign multinationals: notably Kuwait Petroleum International, Shell, Tamoil, ExxonMobil, and (since 2013) the Russian company Lukoil

These companies are active in the production and distribution of petroleum products.

== Controversies ==
In 1974, the association was implicated in the "Scandalo dei petroli" (Oil Scandal), a major corruption and price-fixing investigation that rocked Italy's petroleum industry during that period.
