= Ferdinando Brachetti Peretti =

Italian businessman

Count Ferdinando Maria Brachetti Peretti
- Born: 13 January 1960 (age 66); Rome, Italy
- Education: Sapienza University of Rome
- Occupations: Businessman, photographer
- Years active: 1983–present
- Organization: API Group
- Known for: Chairman and CEO of API Group
- Title: Chairman and CEO of API Holding S.p.A.
- Term: 2007–present
- Predecessor: Count Aldo Maria Brachetti Peretti
- Board member of: API Holding S.p.A. (Chairman and CEO); Api Energia (Chairman); Api Nova Energia (Chairman); Coordination Committee of the API Group (Chairman)
- Spouse: Princess Mafalda von Hessen (m. 2000; div. 2014) Nicole Junkermann (m. 2017)
- Children: 3 (including Cosmo and Briano with Princess Mafalda; Vita with Nicole Junkermann)
- Parents: Count Aldo Maria Brachetti Peretti (father); Mila Peretti (mother)
- Relatives: Ugo Maria Brachetti Peretti (brother); Benedetta Brachetti Peretti (sister); Chiara Brachetti Peretti (sister); Elsa Peretti (aunt)
- Family: Brachetti Peretti
- Awards: Solemn Encomium for the 1980 Irpinia earthquake (from the President of the Republic)

Ferdinando Maria Brachetti Peretti (born in Rome on 13 January 1960), from the wealthy Brachetti Peretti family, is chairman and CEO of an Italian energy company, API Group.

== Early life and education ==
Brachetti Peretti’s father, Count Aldo Maria Brachetti Peretti, spent three decades leading the family’s API Group (Anonima Petroli Italiana). He held the position until 2007, continuing the legacy of his maternal grandfather, Cav. del Lavoro Ferdinando Peretti, who originally founded the firm. His mother, Mila, worked for more than 30 years in the Red Cross and is the only woman in Italy to carry the military grade of General. His aunt is the jewellery designer Elsa Peretti. He is brother to Ugo Brachetti Peretti, in the family company, and to Benedetta Brachetti Peretti, designer and entrepreneur and Chiara Brachetti Peretti.

After graduating from high school with a diploma in classical studies, Brachetti Peretti enrolled in the School of Business and Economics at the University of Rome (“La Sapienza”). During his studies, he served his military service as an officer in the Carabinieri in 1980–1981 in Naples, achieving a Solemn Encomium for the 1980 Irpinia earthquake from the President of the Republic.

== Career ==
Brachetti Peretti began his career in 1983 in the family company, the energy group API Anonima Petroli Italiana – IP Italiana Petroli, 100% owned by API Holding, of which he is, together with his brothers, a 100% shareholder. His father, head of the Group for 30 years, delegated full powers to Brachetti Peretti in September 2007. He is chairman and CEO of API Holding, the financial safe of all the API Group companies and chairman of the two sub-holdings of the electric sector, Api Energia and Api Nova Energia. He is also a member and chairman of the Coordination Committee of the API Group. He moved to London for four years, where he initiated the petroleum trading office. He then transferred to Paris for two years to study administration and finance after an internship at the Paribas Bank; he returned to the headquarters in Rome in the 1990s, taking growing responsibilities in other sectors of the Group. In November 2017 Brachetti Peretti, as chairman and CEO of API Holding, oversaw the company's acquisition of Total/Erg which was reported to be valued at around €650m.

== Personal life ==
In March 2017 Brachetti Peretti married in Rome German-born entrepreneur and investor Nicole Junkermann. They have a daughter, Vita, born in December 2017.

Brachetti Peretti was formerly married to Princess Mafalda of Hesse, daughter of Prince Moritz of Hesse and Princess Tatiana of Sayn-Wittgenstein-Berleburg. They have two sons, Cosmo (born 2002) and Briano (born 2004). The Princess and Brachetti Peretti were divorced in 2014.

Brachetti Peretti creates digital works and photographs of various subjects. His photographs were exhibited at Padiglione Italia in the "Biennale di Venezia 2011".
