= AMICAL Consortium =

Consortium of liberal arts institutions,

The American International Consortium of Academic Libraries (AMICAL) is an association of 28 American-style universities located in 20 countries. It was founded in 2004 by the American University of Paris, with support from the Andrew W. Mellon Foundation.

== Members ==
- Al Akhawayn University in Ifrane (Ifrane, Morocco)
- American Academy in Rome (Rome, Italy)
- American College of Greece (Deree) (Athens, Greece)
- American College of Thessaloniki (Thessaloniki, Greece)
- American University in Bulgaria (Blagoevgrad, Bulgaria)
- American University in Cairo (New Cairo, Egypt)
- American University of Armenia (Yerevan, Armenia)
- American University of Beirut (Beirut, Lebanon)
- American University of Central Asia (Bishkek, Kyrgyzstan)
- American University of Iraq, Sulaimani (Sulaimani, Iraq)
- American University of Kuwait (Kuwait City, Kuwait)
- American University of Nigeria (Yola, Nigeria)
- American University of Paris (Paris, France)
- American University of Rome (Rome, Italy)
- American University of Sharjah (Sharjah, United Arab Emirates)
- Ashesi University (Berekuso, Ghana)
- Central European University (Budapest, Hungary)
- Effat University (Jeddah, Saudi Arabia)
- Forman Christian College (Lahore, Pakistan)
- Franklin University Switzerland (Lugano, Switzerland)
- Habib University (Karachi, Pakistan)
- Haigazian University (Beirut, Lebanon)
- IAU College (Aix-en-Provence, France)
- John Cabot University (Rome, Italy)
- Lebanese American University (Beirut, Lebanon)
- Saint Louis University Madrid Campus (Madrid, Spain)
- University of Central Asia (Bishkek, Kyrgyzstan)
