= Adam Hock =

American businessman (born 1964)

- Born: October 9, 1964 (age 62); New York City, U.S.
- Education: Iona College
- Known for: Facilitating international recognition of the National Transitional Council

Adam Hock (born October 9, 1964) is an American businessman who has founded and co-founded several companies in the financial sector.

== Early life and education ==
Hock was born in Manhattan and raised in Westchester County, New York. He attended Rutgers University on a football scholarship, until an injury ended his participation.

== Professional ==
After college, Hock co-founded New Beginnings Venture Capital Company, which assisted in the raising of funds for young technology firms. He and his company were recruited and absorbed by the Private Client Services division of Bear Stearns. He founded Integrated Strategies Inc., a management consulting company in the financial services vertical where he held the position of chief executive officer. Integrated Strategies provided management consulting services for some of the largest financial services companies in the world. Integrated Strategies Inc. was acquired by a publicly traded technology integration company on July 29, 2005.

== Work with Libya ==
=== Independent Libya Foundation (ILF) ===
In 2010 Hock founded the Independent Libya Foundation (ILF), with Zurich-based Libyan businessman Basit Igtet. The ILF initially focused on supporting the fledgling rebel movement, and upon its founding, the Libyan National Transitional Council. Hock lobbied for support from the international community to augment the process of recognition of the NTC as the sole legitimate governing body on Libya. On June 14, 2011, Hock (and Igtet) met with the president of Panama, Ricardo Martinelli at the Palacio de las Garzas to lobby for official recognition of the NTC. After the meeting, Martinelli officially recognized the NTC as “the legitimate representative of the Libyan people.” Panama became the 14th nation worldwide to recognize the NTC in this manner.

On August 25, 2011, Hock and Igtet met with the President of Colombia, Juan Manuel Santos, at Casa de Nariño to lobby for official recognition of the NTC. That same day, Colombia became the 54th nation worldwide to recognize the NTC. On November 19, 2011, Hock partook in an ILF delegation in Benghazi, Libya to present strategies for rebel re-integration.

=== U.S.-Libya Chamber of Commerce (USLCC) ===
In December 2011, Hock was appointed to the board of the U.S.-Libya Chamber of Commerce, a bi-lateral business promotion organization approved by the United States Chamber of Commerce. Hock was replaced by Sara Bronfman, following his indictment on charges of assault.

== New York nightclub fight ==
In 2012 Hock was involved in a fight at a Manhattan nightclub with four younger men, including Pierre Casiraghi and Vladimir Restoin Roitfeld, and two others. Casiraghi was treated for facial injuries at a Manhattan hospital. Hock was arrested on four counts of assault. Hock contended Casiraghi and the others were the aggressors. Hock was prosecuted, and on February 4, 2013, Hock pleaded guilty to disorderly conduct.
