= Jacques Peretti =

- Born: 1967
- Occupation: Investigative journalist, television producer, journalist, documentarian

Jacques Peretti (born Watford, 1967) is an investigative reporter and broadcaster based in London, United Kingdom. He has written articles for The Guardian, Wired and the Huffington Post.

== Broadcasting ==
His work includes:

- The Trip (1999)
- The Men Who Made Us Fat (2012)
- The Men Who Made Us Thin (2013)
- The Men Who Made Us Spend (2014)
- The Super Rich And Us (2015)
- Britain's Trillion Pound Island - Inside Cayman (2016)
- Who's Spending Britain's Billions? (2016)
- Billion Dollar Deals and How They Changed Your World (2017)
- Michael Jackson: What Really Happened (2007)
- The Real Michael Jackson (2020)
- "Living like a fan of Michael Jackson" (In process)

== Bibliography ==
- Done: The Billion Dollar Deals and How They're Changing Our World (2017)
- The Deals That Made the World (2018)
