= Paola Marzotto =

Italian photographer, fashion designer, journalist

Donna Paola Marzotto
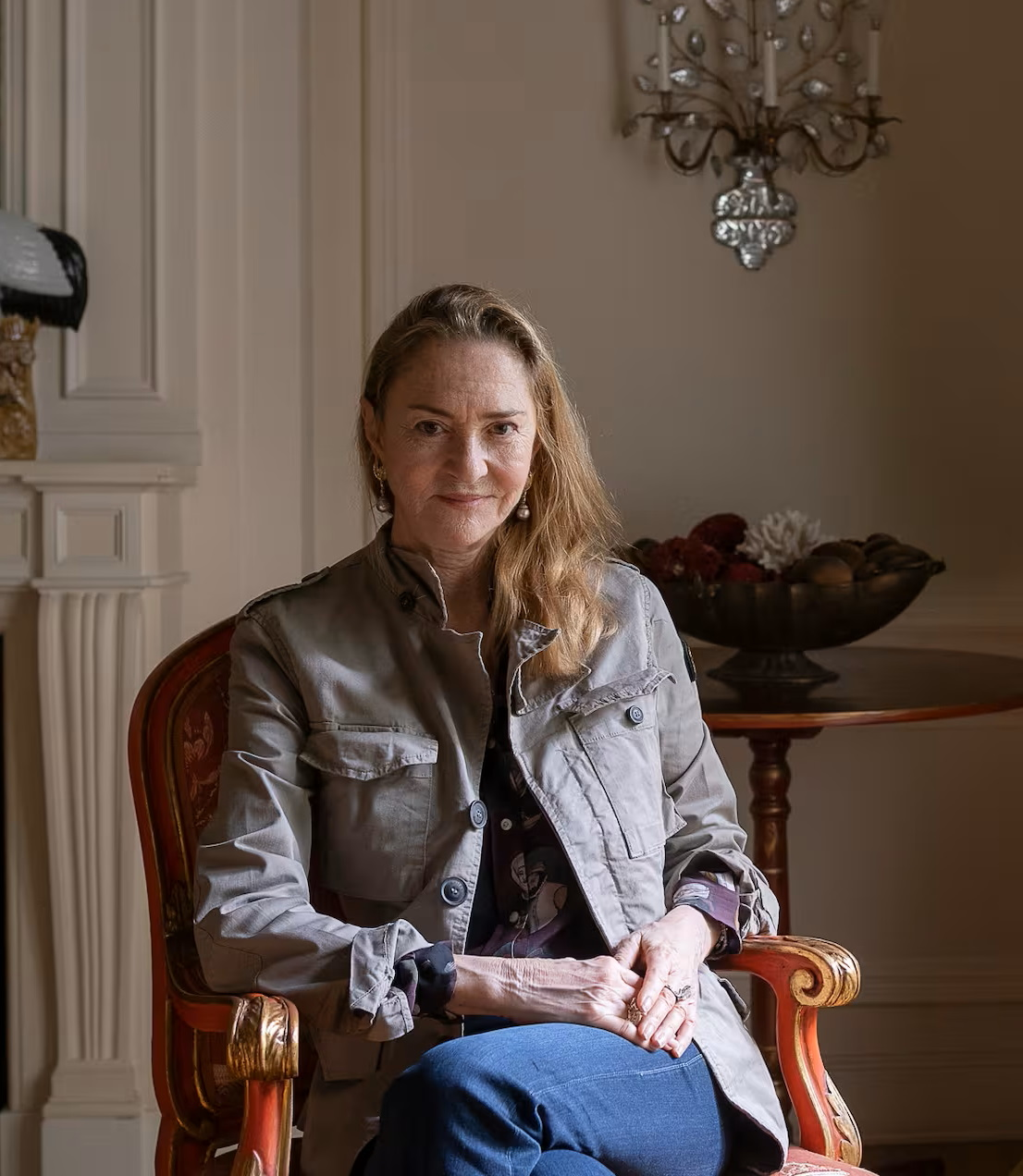
- Born: 25 May 1955 (age 71)
- Occupations: Photographer; fashion designer; journalist
- Partner(s): Carlo Ferdinando Borromeo, Count of Arona
- Children: Carlo Ludovico Borromeo; Beatrice Borromeo Casiraghi
- Parents: Count Umberto Marzotto (father); Marta Marzotto (mother)
- Relatives: Gaetano Marzotto – grandfather Margherita Lampertico – grandmother

Donna Paola Marzotto (born 25 May 1955) is an Italian photographer, journalist and fashion designer. She is also known for her work as an environmentalist and environmental activist. She is the founder of Eye-V Gallery, a collective of international photographers specialized in artistic and natural photography.

== Early life and education ==
Marzotto is the first daughter of Count Umberto Marzotto, and Marta Marzotto. She attended the Liceo Classico Ennio Quirino Visconti in Rome. She then proceeded to study anthropology and art at the John Cabot College. In 1973, her mother moved to the Spanish Steps to a house that she turned into a gathering place for international artists and intellectuals. Here, Marzotto grew up, surrounded by the artistic milieu of the 70s, due to her mother relationship with painter Renato Guttuso.

In the early 1970s, she started working as a journalist, interviewing, among others, Andy Warhol. Interested in theater, television and film reportage, Marzotto participated in taking photographs on the set of Apocalypse Now (1976). From 1977 she worked for broadcasting companies such as Antenna Nord (which later became Italia 1) and RAI.

== Career ==
=== Fashion ===
Paola Marzotto had her first fashion appearance in 1987, reworking Tirolo's Dirndl costumes for her first show in Cortina d'Ampezzo. In 1989, she made her debut in the Milan Collections calendar with Paola Marzotto ready to wear (prêt-à-porter), and in the Italian Haute Couture.

In 1992 she was invited to go to Japan for the Nagoya Film Festival, and then she was selected by the Ministry of Industry to rework the ancient Shibori. Marzotto applied this traditional Japanese technique to Western fashion styles, gaining recognition for her creativity in the fashion world. Some dresses from this collection are exhibited at the Arimatsu Museum in Nagoya.

Between the 1980s and 1990s she participated in thematic exhibitions like Futurismo at Palazzo delle Esposizioni in Rome, L'abito oltre la moda at the Fortuny Museum in Venice, with the installation The Dress of Light, and The Reggi-secolo along with influential designers, stylists and architects of that period.

=== Politics ===
Marzotto entered politics as a candidate for the 1999 European Parliament with the party The Democrats (Italy) by Romano Prodi, affiliated to Antonio Di Pietro's Italy of Values. In 2001–2002, she became a candidate for both the Lombardy Region as well as the Municipality of Milan, where she emerged as group leader of Italy of Values at the Milan Zone 1 Council (2002–2006).

=== Photography ===
In early 2020, Paola Marzotto traveled to Antarctica, where she realized the damages of climate change. She collected a series of photographs which were displayed in the exhibition Antarctica, Melting Beauty in the calendar of the Italian Pavilion of the Venice Biennale on architecture in 2021. Her collection was displayed at the School of Mines and Energy in Madrid in February 2022 on the occasion of the award celebration of the Nature photography contest dubbed #BetterEarthThanMars.

In October 2022, Marzotto's photographic collection was displayed on the occasion of the C40, the world mayors' summit on climate change. The event took place at the Gallery of the Atlantes in the Legislature Palace of Buenos Aires, where in recognition of her work, Marzotto was designed as Guest of Honor by the City's Legislature. The exhibition was also presented at the Museo Ralli in Punta del Este, Uruguay in January 2023. In August 2021 Marzotto founded Eye-V Gallery to promote and organize cultural events related to artistic-natural photography. Eye-V Gallery hosts an international community of photographers and it is based in Uruguay, Buenos Aires, Milan and New York. In 2022, Eye-V Gallery hosted its first exhibition, Ode to Nature in collaboration with the Pool NYC. The exhibition explored the spiritual relationship with Mother Nature through the work of 13 photographers, all with different technological and cultural backgrounds.

== Personal life ==
In February 1978, Marzotto met her parents' friend Carlo Ferdinando Borromeo, Count of Arona with whom she started an 18-year relationship. Borromeo and Marzotto have two children; Carlo Ludovico Borromeo, designer, and Beatrice Borromeo, journalist and TV presenter, daughter-in-law of Princess Caroline of Monaco.
