= Aldo Maria Brachetti Peretti =

Italian businessman (1932–2025)

Count Aldo Maria Brachetti Peretti Cavaliere del Lavoro
- Born: September 18, 1932; Fermo, Italy
- Died: December 26, 2025 (aged 93)
- Education: University of Rome (Degree in economics)
- Occupation: Businessman
- Years active: 1957–2025
- Organization: Gruppo API
- Known for: Chairman of Gruppo API
- Title: Chairman of API Holding S.p.A.
- Term: 1977–2025
- Successor: Ugo Brachetti Peretti
- Board member of: Gruppo API; Unione Petrolifera
- Spouse: Mila Peretti
- Children: Ugo Brachetti Peretti; Ferdinando Brachetti Peretti
- Awards: Cavaliere del Lavoro (1978)

Count Aldo Maria Brachetti Peretti (né Brachetti; 18 September 1932 – 26 December 2025) was an Italian businessman who was chairman of the API Group.

== Life and career ==
Born in Fermo on 18 September 1932, he took his degree in economics and began working at API in 1957, while teaching economics and banking at the Universities of Rome and Parma. In 1965, he joined the board of directors and, in 1974, he was appointed Executive Vice-President and CEO of API. In 1977, he was appointed President and CEO.

In 1978, he received the honor of "Cavaliere del Lavoro" from the President of Italy.

On 6 October 2009, he received an honorary degree in Engineering. At the time of his death in 2025 he was the Chairman of API Holding S.p.A. and of the Unione Petrolifera and one of the most important producers of Bordeaux wines in Europe, with his own vineyard called “Il Pollenza”.

He was the father of Ugo Brachetti Peretti and Ferdinando Brachetti Peretti.

Brachetti Peretti died on 26 December 2025, at the age of 93.
