= Ugo Brachetti Peretti =

Italian oil executive (born 1965)

Count Ugo Maria Brachetti Peretti Cavaliere del Lavoro
- Born: July 8, 1965 (age 61); Rome, Italy
- Education: International Baccalaureate, American Community School in London
- Alma mater: The American University of Rome (BBA); Boston University
- Occupation: Entrepreneur
- Spouse: Countess Isabella Borromeo Arese Taverna (m. 2005)
- Children: 3
- Parents: Count Aldo Maria Brachetti Peretti (father); Mila Peretti (mother)
- Relatives: Princess Matilde zu Fürstenberg (sister-in-law); Lavinia Elkann (sister-in-law); Beatrice Borromeo (half-sister-in-law); John Elkann (brother-in-law)
- Family: Borromeo (by marriage)
- Awards: Cavaliere del Lavoro (2019)

Ugo Maria Brachetti Peretti (born July 8, 1965, in Rome) is an Italian entrepreneur who served as Chairman of the Gruppo API from 2007 to 2026 and is Chief Executive Officer and Chairman of the investment company Energy Capital Fund.

Appointed Cavaliere del Lavoro in 2019, he has served since 2022 as Councillor of the Representation of the Order of Malta to the Italian Republic.

== Family ==
His father, Count Aldo Maria Brachetti Peretti, Cavaliere Del Lavoro was the head of the family group, Anonima Petroli Italiana (API) for thirty years, until his retirement in September 2007. The company was founded by his maternal grandfather, Cavaliere Del Lavoro Ferdinando Peretti. His mother, Mila Peretti, is the National Inspectress of the Italian Red Cross, which she has served for over 30 years. She is the only woman in Italy to carry the military grade of General. In 2005, Peretti married the Countess Isabella Borromeo Arese Taverna (sister of Matilde Borromeo, Princess zu Fürstenberg, and Lavinia, wife of John Elkann, and half-sister of Beatrice Borromeo). They have three children.

== Career ==
He was educated at the American Community School in London, where he graduated in 1983 with an international Baccalaureate degree and then qualified for a degree in Business Administration at the American University of Rome in 1987. He subsequently obtained his specialization at Boston University. He completed his military service as an officer of the Carabinieri.

After 1990, he started working as a manager in the family business of which he and his brothers are 100% shareholders. During his time with API, he has held many positions, at first operating the "downstream cycle" (a combination of activities such as deliveries, transportation, refining, sale and marketing of oil). In 2007, after a series of promotions, he became Chairman of the company. In this capacity, he focused the Group's activities back to the oil sector, with the strengthening of the distribution network and the improvement of the Falconara refinery. He holds several other chairs, vice-chairs and advisory positions within API as well as being a member of the boards at UniCredit, the Executive Council of the "Rome Industrial Union" and Unione Petrolifera.

In 2019, he was appointed Cavaliere Del Lavoro by the president Sergio Mattarella for the oil and energy sector.

From 2019 to April 2022, he served as Ambassador of the Sovereign Order of Malta to Belarus. Since 2022, he has served as Councillor of the Representation of the Sovereign Order of Malta to the Italian Republic.

In December 2022, he signed a binding agreement to acquire all fuel and refining-related activities and assets of Esso Italia.

He is among the founders of IPlanet S.p.A., a Rome-based company operating in mobility services, established in 2024 through a 50–50 joint venture between Gruppo API and Macquarie Capital. The company focuses on installing electric vehicle charging stations at IP Gruppo API-branded service stations.

In September 2025, he signed a binding agreement for the sale of a 99.82% stake in Italiana Petroli (IP) to SOCAR, the state-owned energy company operating in more than 15 countries. The transaction was completed in May 2026, marking also the end of his tenure as Chairman of Gruppo API.
