= Rome Refinery =

Oil refinery in Rome, Italy

Raffineria di Roma S.p.A.
- Company type: S.p.A.
- Industry: Petroleum refining
- Founded: 1950s
- Founder: Shell Italiana
- Headquarters: Rome, Italy
- Area served: Italy
- Products: Petroleum
- Owner: TotalErg (100%)
- Parent: Total; Erg

The Rome Refinery was built in 1950s at Pantano di Grano, south-west of Rome, approximately 10 km from the coast, near the port of Fiumicino.

On July 12, 2005 Shell sold its 20% stake to Total which now owns 77.5% of the company. The remaining part is owned by Erg which owns entirely or partly other 3 refineries in Italy. In 2010, after the merger of Total Italia and Erg Petroli, the refinery passed entirely under the control of TotalErg.

It has a processing capacity of 4.3 Mt/a, is equipped with a visbreaking plant of around 1.7 Mt/a and a plant for the production of bitumen. It has a sea terminal to receive raw materials and dispense with surplus products. The Rome refinery is also an important logistical base: a certain amount of products, equal to 50% of refinery production, arrives from the outside, using the structure as a transit depot.
