= MonteShell =

MonteShell S.p.A.
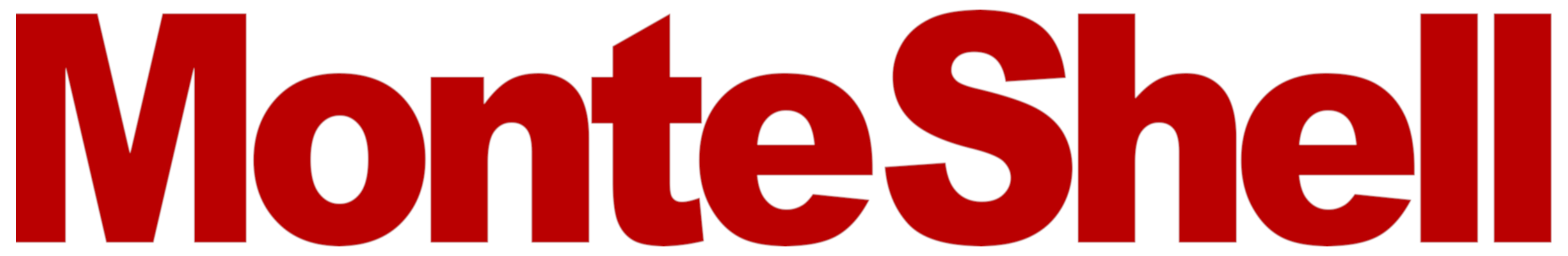

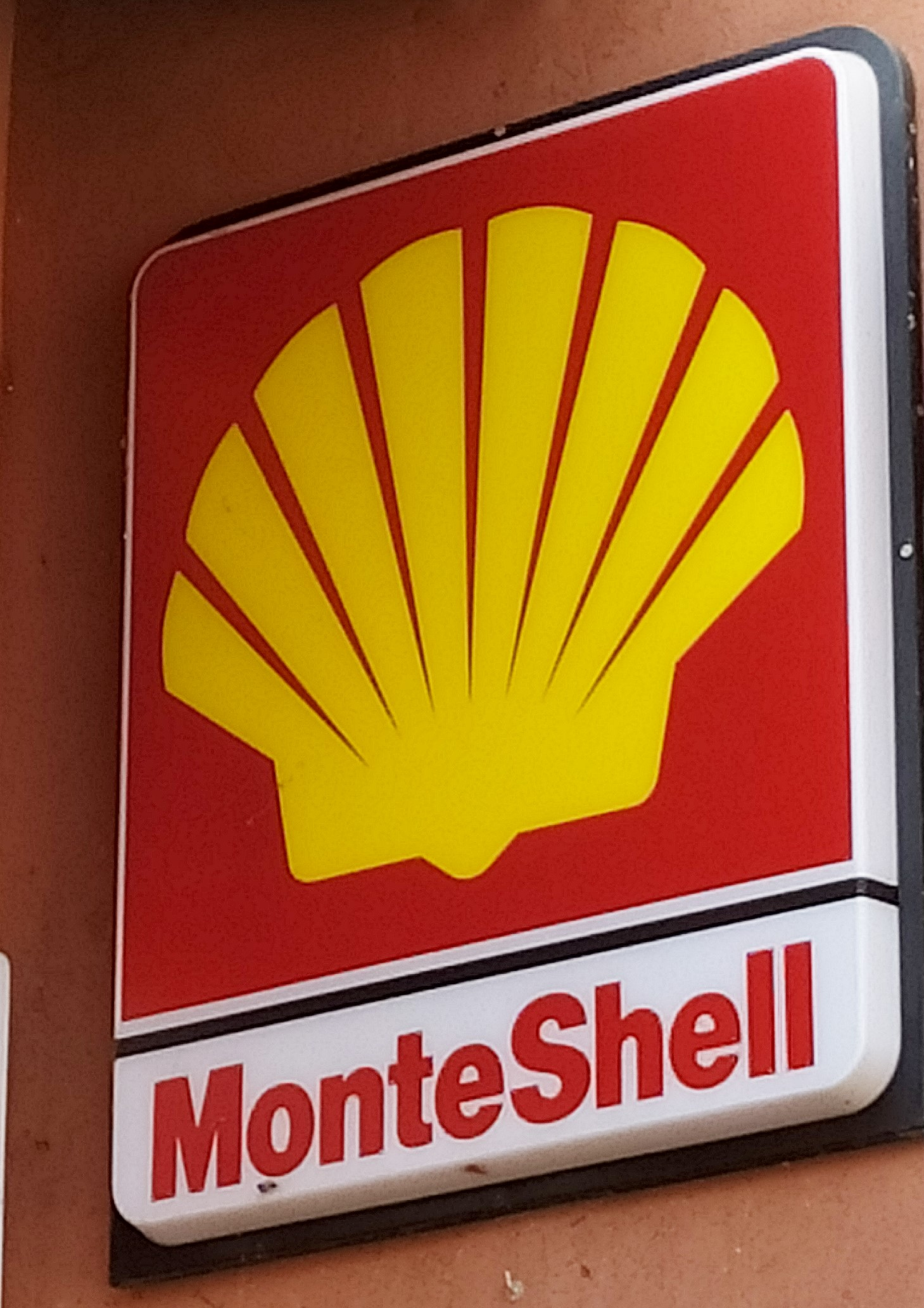
- MonteShell sign
- Type: S.p.A.
- Industry: Petroleum
- Founded: 1987; 39 years ago
- Founder: SELM - Servizi ELettrici Montedison; Shell Italia
- Defunct: 1995
- Fate: Sold and merged into Shell Italia
- Successor: Shell Italia
- Headquarters: Milan, Italy
- Area served: Italy
- Products: Petroleum
- Owner: Servizi ELettrici Montedison - SELM (50%); Shell Italia (50%)
- Parent: Montedison; Shell

MonteShell S.p.A. was an Italian company active in the oil sector, jointly controlled by Servizi ELettrici Montedison - SELM S.p.A. and Shell Italia S.p.A. In particular, it dealt with the refining, transport and distribution of automotive fuel.

== History ==
At the beginning of the 1960s, Montecatini and Shell had already joined forces in MonteShell Petrolchimica, owner of a plant in the chemical hub of Ferrara and an industrial site in Brindisi. Towards the end of the decade, Montedison purchased Shell's share and merged the petrochemical sector into Montesud. Subsequently, in 1973, Shell abandoned Italy by selling its plants to Eni.

In 1987 SELM, of the Montedison group, acquired the Italian network of Total, which had been losing money for years, for around 240 billion lire. The reason for the operation is dictated by the need to open a new distribution channel following the opening of crude oil production in the Sicily Channel, with the opening of the Vega platform; specifically, SELM's subsidiary, Valmont, bought 100% of Total Sipa and the 2,566 owned plants which were added to the 400 held by SELM, coming to hold 7.3% of the national market, the fourth Italian player. Also included in the Total package was the ex Aquila refinery, useful for the vertical integration of activities.

A few months later the creation of MonteShell was announced, a joint venture between SELM and Shell Italia, created to compete in the distribution of fuels, lubricants, LPG and bitumen: SELM puts its know-how in extraction and refining, while Shell in retail. Added to the 3,000 SELM stations are the 120 Shell refueling points (acquired a few years earlier from Conoco), in addition to the ROL refinery sold by Montedison. In 1993 the company achieved the best balance sheet in its history, with 3,801 billion in turnover, EBITDA of 107.4 billion and a profit of 5.2 billion. The network drops to 2,154 plants and MonteShell is in fourth place among operators, after Agip/IP, Esso and Q8.

In 1995, MonteShell ceased operations. Edison, the successor to SELM, sold a 50% stake in the company to Shell for 238 billion lire. The collaboration between the two companies continued for a limited period, primarily in the areas of LPG and bitumen activities.

== See also ==
- Montedison
- Royal Dutch Shell
