= Unijet Flight 074P =

2014 aviation accident in Russia

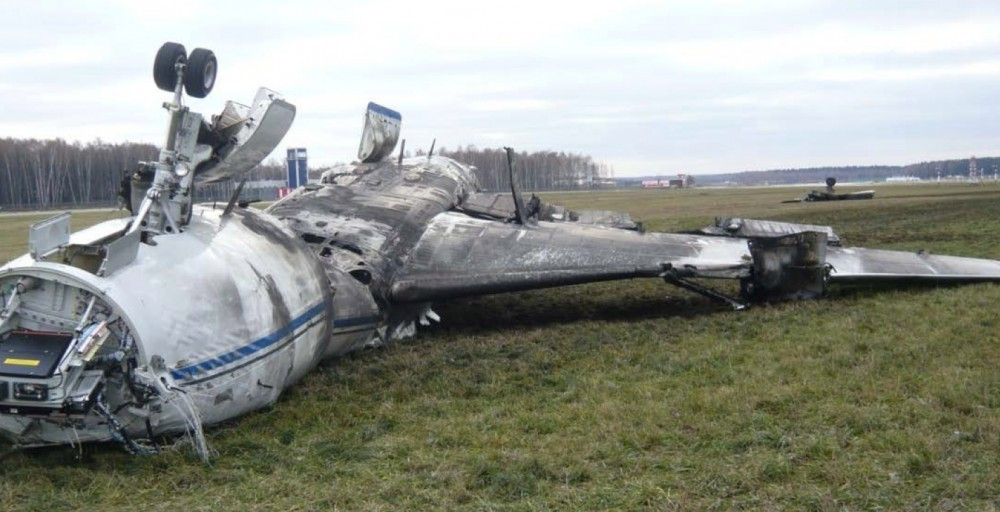
- Wreckage of the aircraft

Accident
- Date: 20 October 2014
- Summary: Runway incursion by ground vehicle; collision on take-off
- Site: Vnukovo International Airport, Moscow, Russia; 55.5961°N 37.2675°E
- Total fatalities: 4
- Total injuries: 1

Aircraft
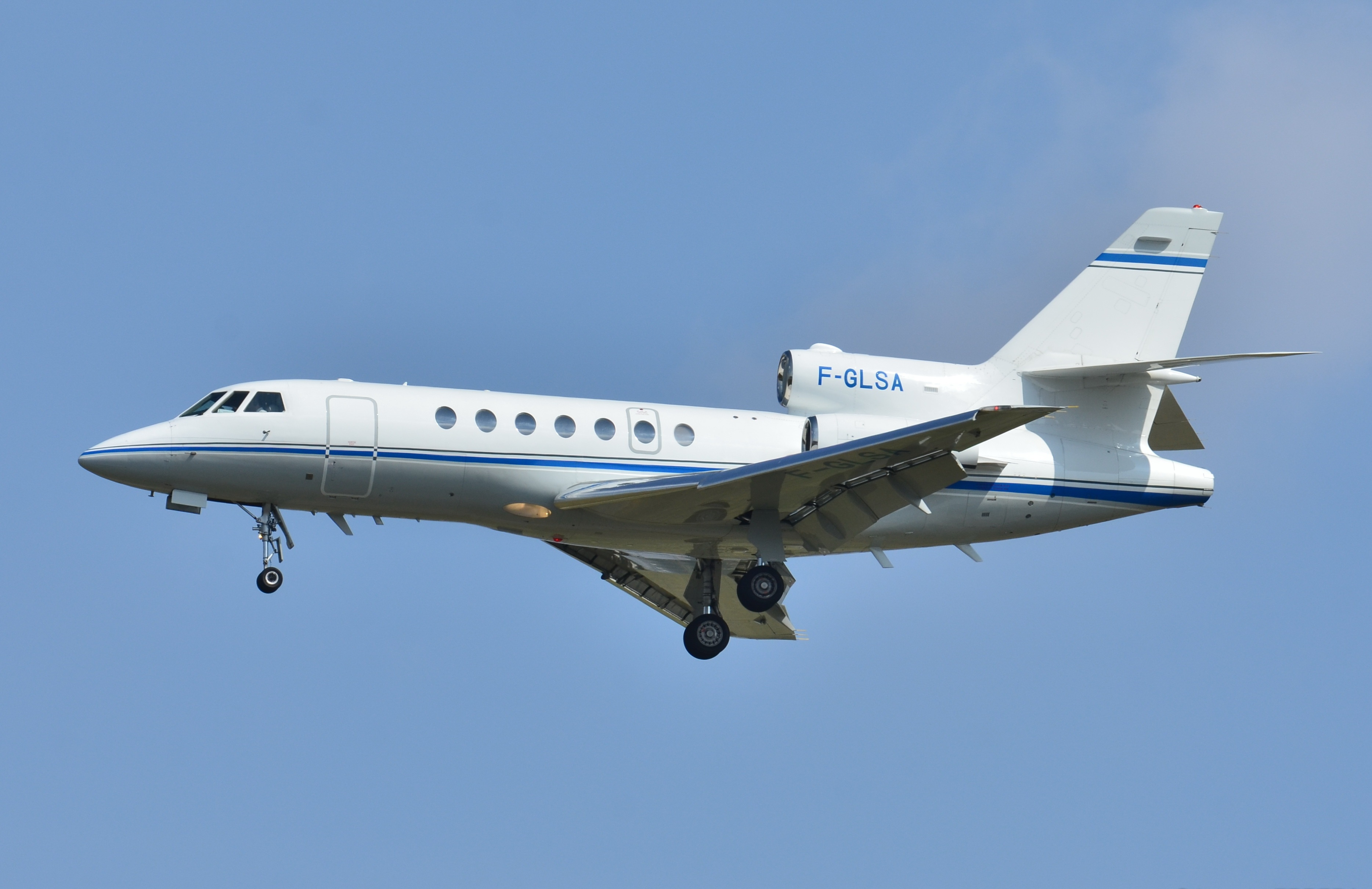
- F-GLSA, the aircraft involved in the accident, photographed in September 2014
- Aircraft type: Dassault Falcon 50
- Operator: Unijet
- Registration: F-GLSA
- Flight origin: Vnukovo International Airport, Moscow, Russia
- Destination: Paris, France
- Occupants: 4
- Passengers: 1
- Crew: 3
- Fatalities: 4
- Survivors: 0

Ground casualties
- Ground injuries: 1

On 20 October 2014, Unijet Flight 074, a Dassault Falcon 50 business jet taking off from Vnukovo International Airport in Moscow, Russia, crashed into a snow plow that had strayed onto the runway, killing all four people on board. Among the victims was Total's Chairman and CEO Christophe de Margerie, who was returning to Paris, France.

The driver of the snow removal vehicle, who was injured in the collision, was found to have alcohol in his blood and subsequently pleaded guilty to causing de Margerie's death.

== Accident ==
The accident occurred in darkness at 23:57 Moscow Time (MSK). While executing Flight 074P's take-off run, the Falcon 50 struck with its right wing and landing gear a snow clearing vehicle that was occupying the runway. The jet rolled inverted and crashed on the grass next to the runway. A post-impact fire broke out, but was quickly extinguished by the airport's fire crew. There were no survivors among the four people on board the jet: two pilots, a flight attendant and Margerie, the only passenger.

== Aircraft ==
The Dassault Falcon 50EX with tail number F-GLSA, serial number 348, first flew in 2006 and was less than eight years old. The airplane was owned by Sanofi-Aventis Groupe SA, but operated by Unijet, which specializes in business aviation.

== Investigation and trial ==
Five people were eventually charged with a crime: airport aerodrome service lead engineer Vladimir Ledenev, snowplow driver Vladimir Martynenko, air traffic controller Aleksandr Kruglov, trainee controller Svetlana Krivsun and Vnukovo flight director Roman Dunayev. Martynenko, Ledenev and Krivsun were charged with violating the article 263.3 of the Criminal Code of Russia (violating safety rules of transportation and air travel, which led by neglect to death of two or more people). As of May 2016, the investigation was continuing on the matter of three more potential accused, Vnukovo Airport shift director Sergei Kosik, branch director of Moscow Air Traffic Control Center Vladimir Uzhakov and Uzhakov's deputy Aleksandr Povaliy. The final version of the indictment was issued on 18 January 2016.

In March 2016, 5 insurance companies (Berkshire Hathaway International Insurance, Tokio Marine Kiln, Mitsui Sumitomo Insurance Group, Great Lakes Reinsurance and Mapfre) sued the airport for 10 million euros to recover the payments made to their clients in connection with the incident. The lawsuit was suspended in August 2016 until the resolution of the criminal case.

On 7 July 2017, Martynenko and Ledenev were sentenced to 4 and 3.5 years of imprisonment respectively following a guilty plea, and immediately amnestied. The charges against Dunayev, Kruglov and air traffic controller Nadezhda Arkhipova were moved into a separate case. Charges against Krivsun were dismissed in early 2016 due to "absence of criminal actions". On 24 July 2017, the court accepted an appeal on Martynenko's and Lebedev's sentences from Patrick Vervelle, whose wife, stewardess Ruslana, died in the crash. According to Russian law, Vervelle is considered a victim of this crime. Vervelle's civil suit against the airport was not accepted by the court earlier.

In January 2018, Moscow's Arbitration Court accepted a lawsuit by Unijet, the company that was operating the aircraft, against Vnukovo International Airport and FGUP "Goskorporatsiya po OrVD" (the air traffic control entity), for 6,700,000 euros in damages.
