= TotalErg =

Former Italian oil company

TotalErg S.p.A.

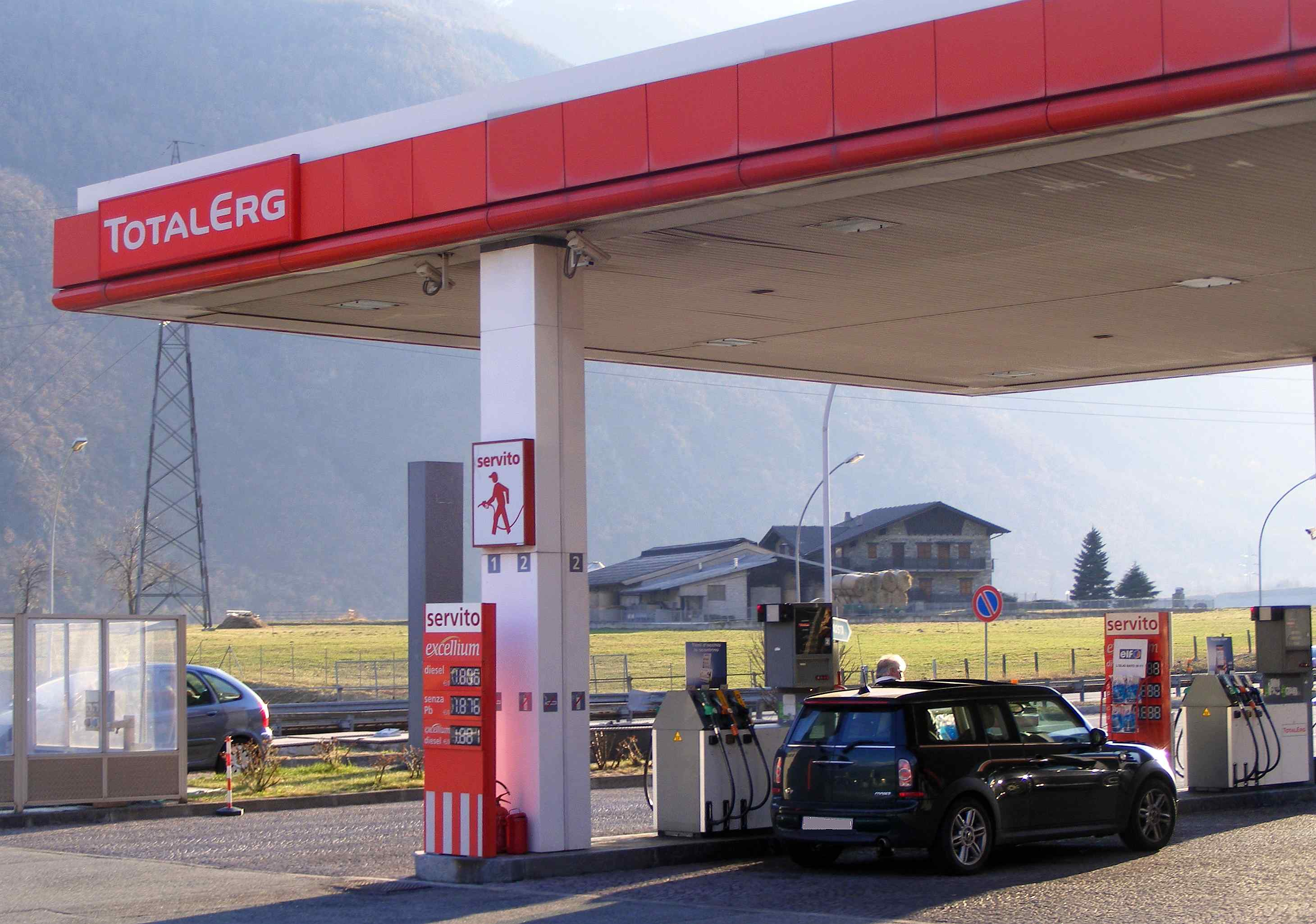
- A TotalErg petrol station.
- Company type: Joint venture
- Industry: Petroleum
- Predecessor: Total Italia; Erg Petroli
- Founded: October 1, 2010; 15 years ago
- Founder: Total; Erg
- Defunct: March 11, 2019
- Fate: Merged into Gruppo API
- Successor: Gruppo API; Total Italia
- Headquarters: Rome, Italy
- Area served: Italy
- Products: Fuels; Lubricants
- Owner: Total (49%); Erg (51%)
- Parent: Total; Erg
- Subsidiaries: Totalgaz Italia (100%); Rome Refinery (100%)
- Website: www.totalerg.it

TotalErg S.p.A. was an Italian company that operated in the refining and distribution of petroleum products. It was a joint venture between Total SA (49%) and Erg S.p.A. (51%).

Founded in 2010, with its birth, all the previous Total and Erg service stations were replaced with the new brand.

In 2018 was acquired and replaced by API-IP.

== History ==
The company, born on 1 October 2010 from the merger of Total Italia with Erg Petroli, operated in five business areas: Refining, Supply and Logistics; Net; Wholesale; Speciality. With a network of around 2,600 distributors, fuel sales of over 3 billion liters and a market share of around 11%, TotalErg was one of the main operators in the sector. In the Wholesale sector, TotalErg marketed over 1.5 million tonnes of fuels and combustibles - diesel, fuel oils, petrol - for industrial, civil and agricultural use, selling both to retailers in the sector and directly to consumers through the subsidiary Eridis.

In the Specialty sector it markets bitumen and modified bitumen.

On 10 January 2018 TotalErg was acquired by Gruppo API, with the exception of the Special Fluids division, acquired by the newly formed Total Italia, and the subsidiary Totalgaz Italia, sold to the UGI Corporation and renamed UniverGas Italia.

All TotalErg stations will be progressively replaced by those bearing the IP Gruppo API brand.

In 2019, TotalErg merged into Gruppo API.

== See also ==
- Erg
- Gruppo API
- IP Gruppo API
- Total
