= Patrick Pouyanné =

French businessman and engineer (born 1963)

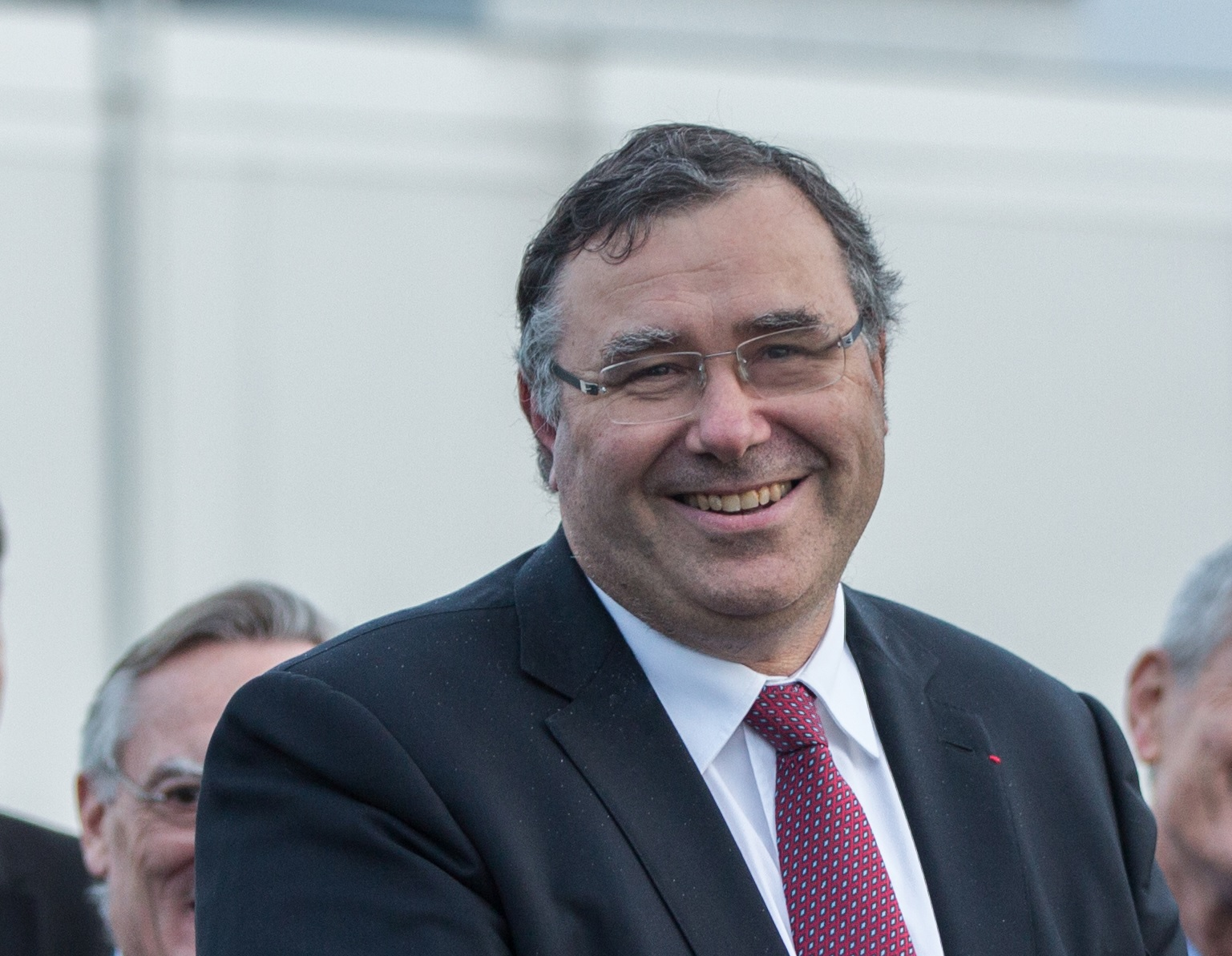
- Pouyanné in 2017
- Born: Patrick Jean Pouyanné; 24 June 1963 (age 63); Le Petit-Quevilly, Normandy, France
- Education: École Polytechnique; Mines ParisTech
- Occupations: Chairman and CEO of TotalEnergies (2014–present)

Patrick Jean Pouyanné (French pronunciation: [patʁik ʒɑ̃ pujane]; born 24 June 1963) is a French businessman and engineer who has been the chairperson and chief executive officer of TotalEnergies since 2014.

== Early life and education ==
Pouyanné was born in Petit-Quevilly, Seine-Maritime, France. At 20, he entered the École Polytechnique where he graduated with an engineering degree.

== Career ==
=== Career in the public sector ===
Pouyanné started his career in 1989 at the Ministry of Industry. In 1993, he became the technical advisor of Édouard Balladur, the French Prime Minister at the time. In 1995, he became technical advisor for environment and industry, and chief of staff of François Fillon right after at the Information Technology and Space Minister from 1995 to 1996.

=== Career in the private sector ===
In January 1997, Pouyanné joined the petroleum company Elf as general secretary for the Angolan subsidiary. Two years later, he was named at the management of the Qatari's exploration-production department.

In 2000 Total absorbed Elf and Pouyanné kept his position in this new French conglomerate that joined the ten largest petroleum groups in the world. In 2002 he became Total's senior vice president of the exploration production department in charge of the finance, economics and information systems and then in charge of strategy business development and R&D in 2006.

In May 2006 Pouyanné joined Total's management committee, and was named deputy general manager of the refining and chemistry department in 2011. He joined Total's executive committee and was named president of the refining chemicals department in 2012.

In October 2014, following the death of Christophe de Margerie, CEO of the group, it was decided to separate the functions of "president of the board of directors" and "executive director". Pouyanné was appointed CEO and president of the executive committee, while Thierry Desmarest, then honorary president, was recalled for the position of temporary president.

In May 2015, Pouyanné was elected as a member of the board of directors of Total. In December he was appointed chairman and CEO of Total, combining both roles.

At the 2018 World Economic Forum in Davos, Pouyanné attended a dinner of U.S. President Donald Trump with a group of European CEOs. On 1 December 2022, he was among the guests invited to the state dinner hosted by U.S. President Joe Biden in honor of President Emmanuel Macron at the White House.

== Other activities ==
=== Corporate boards ===
- Capgemini, Member of the Board of Directors (since 2017)

=== Non-profit organizations ===
- Brookings Institution, Member of the Board of Trustees
- European Round Table of Industrialists (ERT), Member
- Polytechnic Institute of Paris, Member of the Board of Directors (since 2019)
- The Business Council, Member

== Recognition ==
Pouyanné was decorated as Knight of the Legion of Honour in September 2015.

Business positions
Preceded by Christophe de Margerie	CEO of Total; 2014–present	Succeeded by Incumbent
