= Girassol oil field =

Angolan oil field in the Atlantic Ocean

Girassol Oil Field
- Country: Angola
- Region: Atlantic Ocean
- Offshore/onshore: offshore
- Operator: TotalEnergies

Field history
- Discovery: 1996
- Start of production: 2002

Production
- Current production of oil: 200,000 barrels per day (~1.0×10^{7} t/a)
- Estimated oil in place: 94 million tonnes (~ 100×10^{6} m^{3} or 700 million bbl)

The Girassol Oil Field is an oil field located in the Atlantic Ocean. It was discovered in 1996 and developed by Total. The oil field is operated and owned by TotalEnergies. The total proven reserves of the Girassol oil field are around 700 million barrels (94 million tonnes), and production is centered on 200,000 barrels per day (32,000 m^{3}/d).
