= Christophe de Margerie =

French businessman (1951–2014)

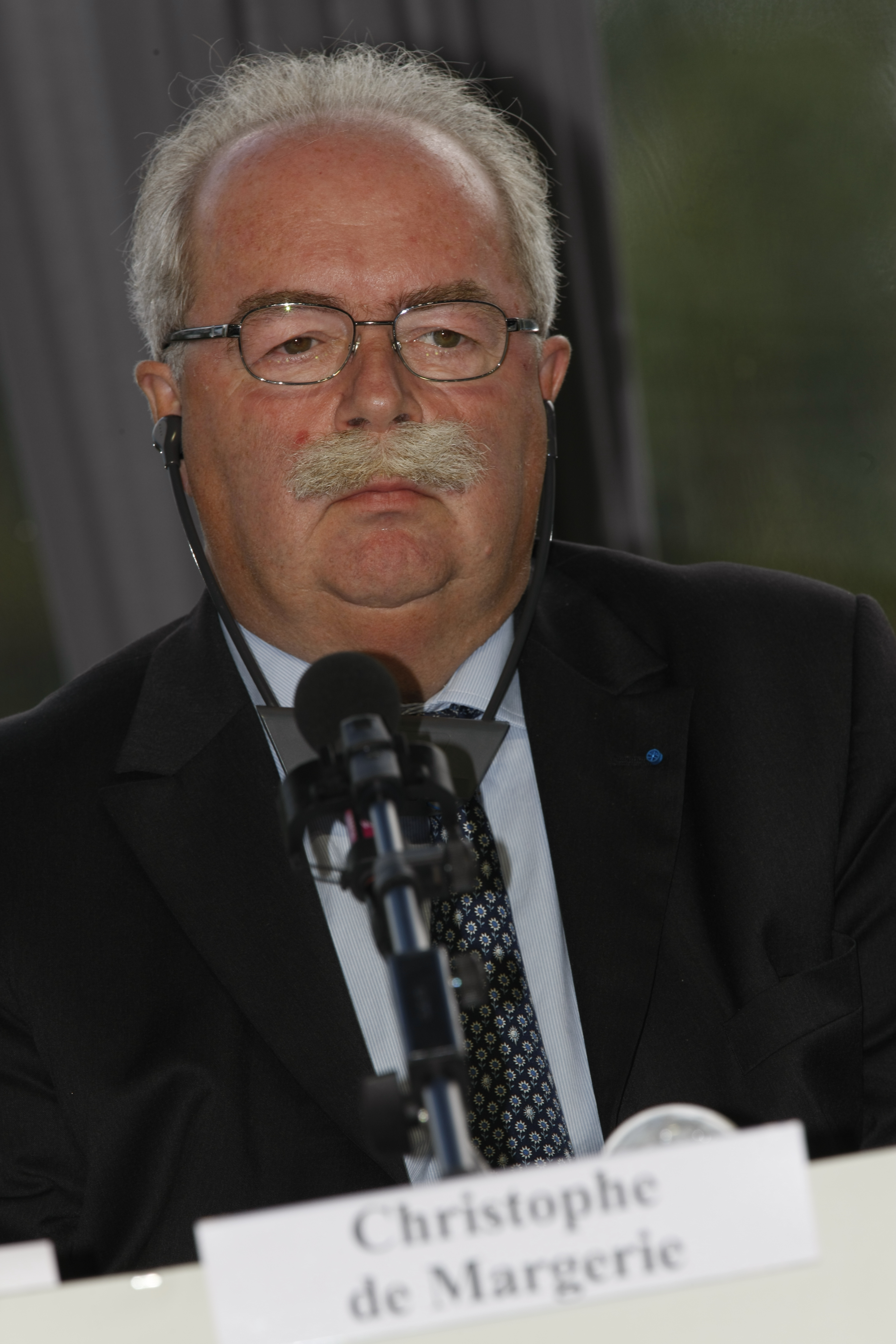
- de Margerie in 2009
- Born: Christophe Rodocanachi; 6 August 1951; Mareuil-sur-Lay-Dissais, France
- Died: 20 October 2014 (aged 63); Moscow, Russia
- Education: ESCP Europe
- Occupation: CEO of Total
- Years active: 2007–2014
- Board member of: Total
- Relatives: Pierre Taittinger (grandfather)

Christophe de Margerie (French pronunciation: [kʁistɔf də maʁʒəʁi], 6 August 1951 – 20 October 2014) was a French businessman. He served as the chairman and chief executive officer of French oil corporation Total.

== Early life ==
Christophe de Margerie was born in Mareuil-sur-Lay-Dissais, France, on 6 August 1951. His parents were Pierre-Alain Rodocanachi and Colette Taittinger. His mother later married Pierre-Alain Jacquin de Margerie, who adopted him. He is a graduate of Ecole Supérieure de Commerce de Paris.

Margerie was the grandson of Pierre Taittinger, founder of Jeunesses Patriotes, and the half-brother of Victoire de Margerie, the current CEO of Rondol.

== Career ==
Margerie joined Total, after graduating from ESCP Europe in Paris in 1974. He started working for Total in the Finance Department and Exploration & Production division.

He became president of Total Middle East in 1995 before joining the group's executive committee as president of the Exploration & Production division in May 1999. In January 2002, he became president of the Exploration & Production division of Total.

He was appointed a member of the board of directors on 12 May 2006 and became CEO on 14 February 2007. He became chairman of the company on 21 May 2010, a post he held until his death in 2014. Under de Margerie's leadership, Total expanded its operations in Iraqi Kurdistan, Myanmar, Qatar, and Russia.

De Margerie had strong ties with many countries, particularly Russia. As head of Total, he was very critical of sanctions placed on Russia in response to its involvement in Ukraine, labeling them "useless" and advocating for Western oil companies to continue dealing with Russia. De Margerie, charismatic and dubbed "Big Mustache", was an astute strategist who recognized that the sanctions had placed the Total Group at a distinct advantage to the restrained international competitors. He down played the situation by saying that “it was not the first time there was a crisis between Europe and Russia”. Russia's President Vladimir Putin paid tribute to de Margerie as a “true friend of our country” via telegram to the French President, Mr Hollande; further stating, de Margerie had “pioneered many of the major joint projects and laid the foundation for many years of fruitful co-operation between France and Russia in the energy sector”.

On 23 July 2011, he and 15 other heads of French companies asked the French government to pay more taxes.

In May 2013, Total was fined $398.2 million in a settlement with U.S. authorities over allegations the company paid $60 million in bribes to obtain oil and gas contracts in Iran between 1995 and 2004. French prosecutors desired to charge de Margerie for corrupting foreign public officials and misuse of company funds. Later that year, citing lack of evidence, de Margerie was acquitted by a Paris court in charges relating to an Iraq oil-for-food scandal, in which Total was accused of using bribery and other illicit means to access Iraqi oil between 1996 and 2003.

== Death ==
Margerie died in an aircraft crash in Moscow on 20 October 2014, along with the three-member crew (Yann Pican, Maxime Rassiat and Ruslana Vervelle). The aircraft, a Dassault Falcon 50, hit a snowplow on take-off from the Vnukovo International Airport.

Margerie was returning to Paris after a meeting at the country house of Russian Prime Minister Dmitry Medvedev, near Moscow, subsequent to a business leaders' meeting in Gorki. The two men had been discussing investments in Russia amid the 2014 pro-Russian unrest in the East of Ukraine and the resulting international sanctions imposed on Russia as a result of the standoff. French authorities opened a manslaughter investigation.

=== Legacy ===
The Russian Order of Honour was posthumously awarded to Margerie.

A Sovcomflot icebreaking LNG carrier (IMO 9737187) was named after Margerie in 2017. The ship is 299 meters long, 128,826 gross register tonnage and was built by Daewoo Shipbuilding & Marine Engineering.

Business positions
Preceded by Thierry Desmarest	CEO of Total; 2007–2014	Succeeded by Patrick Pouyanné
