= Thierry Desmarest =

French businessman (1945–2024)

- Born: 18 December 1945; Paris, France
- Died: 9 January 2024 (aged 78)
- Education: École Polytechnique; Mines ParisTech
- Occupation: Businessman
- Title: CEO, Total
- Term: 1995–2007

Thierry Desmarest (18 December 1945 – 9 January 2024) was a French businessman. He was an honorary chairman of Total and its chief executive officer from May 1995 until February 2007, when he was replaced by Christophe de Margerie.

In 1999, Desmarest had led the TotalFina oil company through the acquisition of a Belgian oil company, Petrofina, for $12 billion. In July 1999, Desmarest had also led the TotalFina enterprise through the acquisition of Elf Acquitaine for $44 billion. It was this procurement that raised TotalFina to the fourth largest oil company in the world.

Desmarest had multinational and intercontinental experience within the oil industry. As a head of the exploration and production department at TotalFina he was stationed in Venezuela and Algeria. During his time overseas, he procured oil and gas reserves to add to Totalfina's oil supply. In 1995, Desmarest he closed a landmark deal with Tehran in Iran making Totalfina the first oil company outside of Iran to drill for oil since 1979. Desmarest's contemporaries nicknamed him "Le Petit Prince" (The Little Prince).

His position as chairman of the board of directors of Total expired on 18 December 2015, in line with the age limits specified by the group. Thierry Desmarest remained honorary chairman of Total and as a director until the annual shareholders’ meeting on 24 May 2016.

Desmarest died from complications of Alzheimer's disease on 9 January 2024, at the age of 78.

Business positions
Preceded by Serge Tchuruk	CEO of Total; 1995–2007	Succeeded by Christophe de Margerie
