= Gruppo API =

Italian energy company

Italiana Petroli S.p.A.

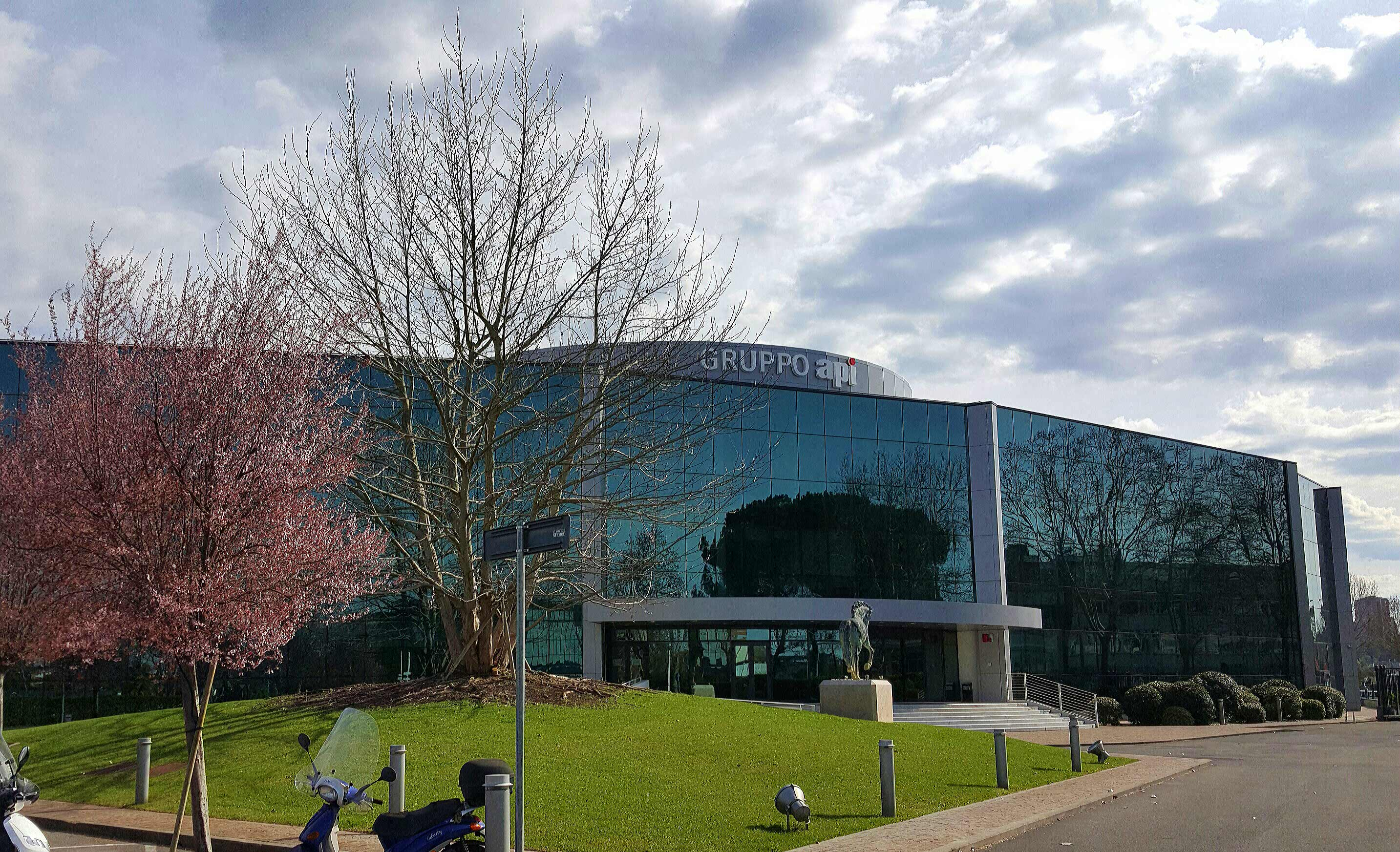
- Gruppo API headquarters
- Formerly: Anonima Petroli Italiana S.p.A. (1933-2019)
- Type: Private
- Industry: Energy; Petroleum
- Founded: 1933; 93 years ago
- Founder: Ferdinando Peretti
- Headquarters: Rome, Italy
- Number of locations: 4,525
- Key people: Ugo Brachetti Peretti (Chairman)
- Products: Petroleum; Petrochemicals
- Brands: IP Gruppo API
- Revenue: €6.8 billion (2018)
- Net income: €63 million (2018)
- Owner: SOCAR (100%)
- Number of employees: 1500 (2018)
- Parent: SOCAR
- Subsidiaries: API Ancona Refinery (100%); IPlanet (50%)
- Website: www.gruppoapi.com

Italiana Petroli S.p.A. (until 2019 Anonima Petroli Italiana S.p.A.), also known by the acronym API or Gruppo API, is an Italian petroleum and energy company headquartered in Rome. It is active in the fuel and mobility services sector through the IP Gruppo API brand.

Until 2025 it was a subsidiary of API Holding, 100% owned by the Brachetti Peretti family. Today it is owned by the Azerbaijani petroleum company SOCAR. The chairman of API is Ugo Brachetti Peretti and the CEO is Alberto Chiarini.

In 2018 the company totaled €6.8 billion in turnover and €63.1 million in operating profit.

== History ==
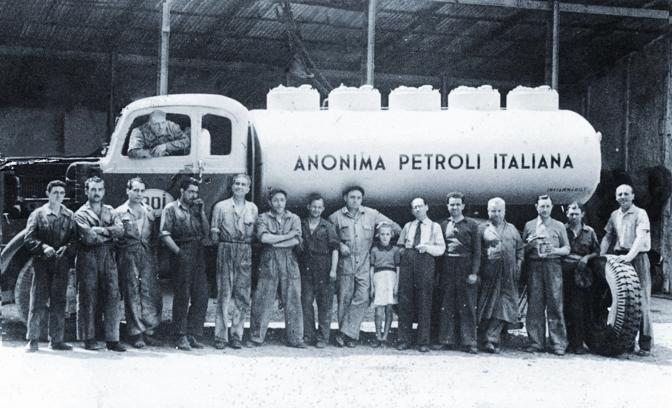
Ferdinando Peretti and his eldest daughter Mila at Anonima Petroli Italiana.

Anonima Petroli Italiana (API) was founded in Ancona in 1933 by Ferdinando Peretti. It operates as a strategic coordinator of all API group's activities, through the direct supplying of semi-finished crude oil and assigned in the production, the acquisition of finished products and their transport, the exchanges with other oil companies to optimize the distributive logistics, the complementary activity of trading of crude oil and by-products to clients, and the sale of all the by-products in Italy and to foreign countries. It also is dedicated to operate and develop oil and gas field properties. It owns a refinery in Ancona with a capacity of 3.9 million tonnes/year and an electric power plant of 250 MW.

In 2005, the company acquired Italiana Petroli (IP) from Agip (Eni). After a few years running the chains in parallel, it switched all its stations to a revamped IP image and supplies in 2012 around 4,200 filling stations (up from around 1,600 at the time of the acquisition) with a market share of 11%.

In 2017, Total and Erg signed an agreement with Anonima Petroli Italiana, to sell the fuel marketing and refining assets in their TotalErg joint venture. Total has stated that the reason behind this divestment is that the Italian fuel market is highly fragmented and the company's expectations for profitability have not been met.

In 2018 TotalErg was acquired by Gruppo API, with the exception of the Special Fluids division, acquired by the newly formed Total Italia, and the subsidiary Totalgaz Italia, sold to the UGI Corporation and renamed UniverGas Italia.

All TotalErg stations will be progressively replaced by those bearing the IP Gruppo API brand.

In 2019, TotalErg merged into Anonoma Petroli Italiana, and the company took on the name Italiana Petroli.

In September 2025, Gruppo API has been sold to the Azerbaijani petroleum company SOCAR.

== Operations ==
The Gruppo API also includes:

- API Ancona Refinery
- API Energia
- Festival
- APIOil UK
- API Services

API leverages a network of refineries for a total capacity of 5.5 million tonnes per year, including the entirety of the Ancona refinery, a portion of the Sarpom refinery in Trecate (Novara), and contract work at the Alma refinery in Ravenna.

The company derives its revenue from two main sources. Firstly, they distribute semi-finished crude oil products for the petrochemical industry to use in the rubber and other associated industries. These products are being sold in both domestic and international markets. Secondly, the company generates income from the ownership and operations of the IP gas station chain. After purchasing 2,600 gas stations from the company Eni, IP currently manages in 2009 over 4,200 gas stations, which are supported by the company's own oil products.

Starting in July 2021, Gruppo API has incorporated renewable raw materials into its refining process to produce biofuels.

In 2024 IP and Macquarie created a 50/50 joint venture, IPlanet, for the installation of electric charging stations in service stations.

== IP Gruppo API ==
IP Gruppo API

Italiana Petroli, also known by the acronym IP or IP Gruppo API, is the brand owned by Gruppo API active in the fuel and mobility services sector.

Italiana Petroli (IP) was officially born in Genoa in May 1974 as the epilogue of the process which, at the end of 1973, had led to the acquisition of the activities of Shell Italiana, by Agip (Eni): the new company inherits the entire distribution network of the Anglo-Dutch company. The new brand replaced that of Shell during 1975; the renewal process, in addition to the image, leads to the modernization of the company's service stations and the updating of the range of products sold.

At the end of 2004 Eni put IP up for sale via tender, which in the first months of 2005 was purchased by Anonima Petroli Italiana (API) for 189 million euros; the transition was formalized the following 6 September. In 2007 IP was merged by incorporation into API: a corporate rebranding followed which led all former API distributors to adopt the IP brand.

In 2017, with the acquisition of TotalErg by Gruppo API, the former TotalErg network switched to the IP brand which thus became, with around 5,000 distributors, the most widespread oil brand on Italian roads with the 24% of the national market.

== Gallery ==
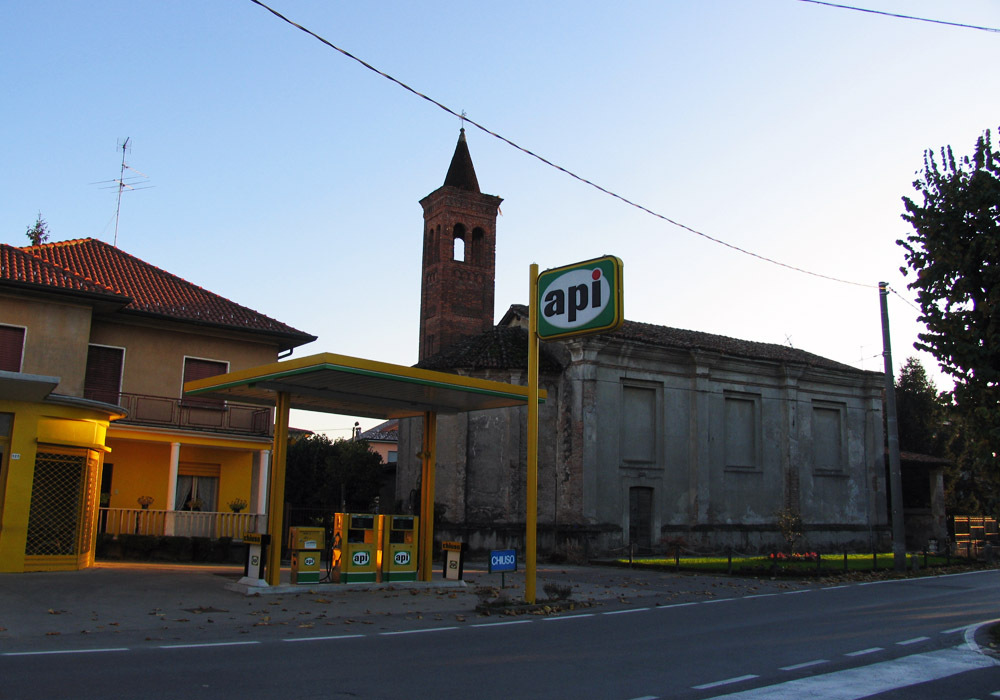
Old API gas station.

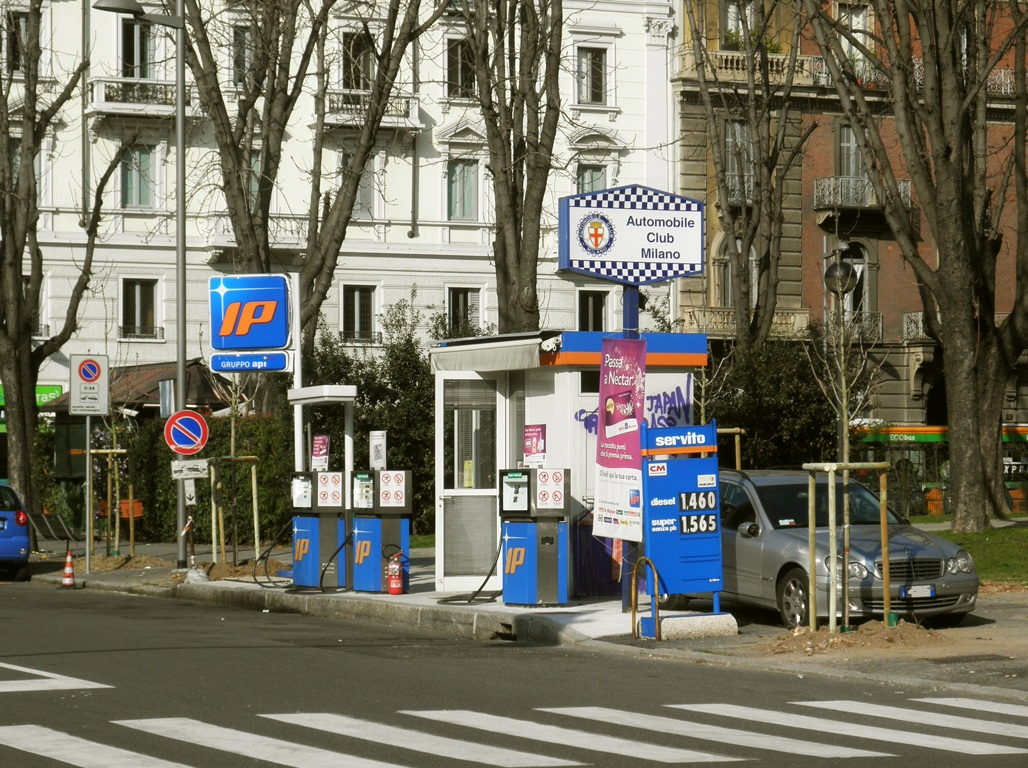
IP gas station.

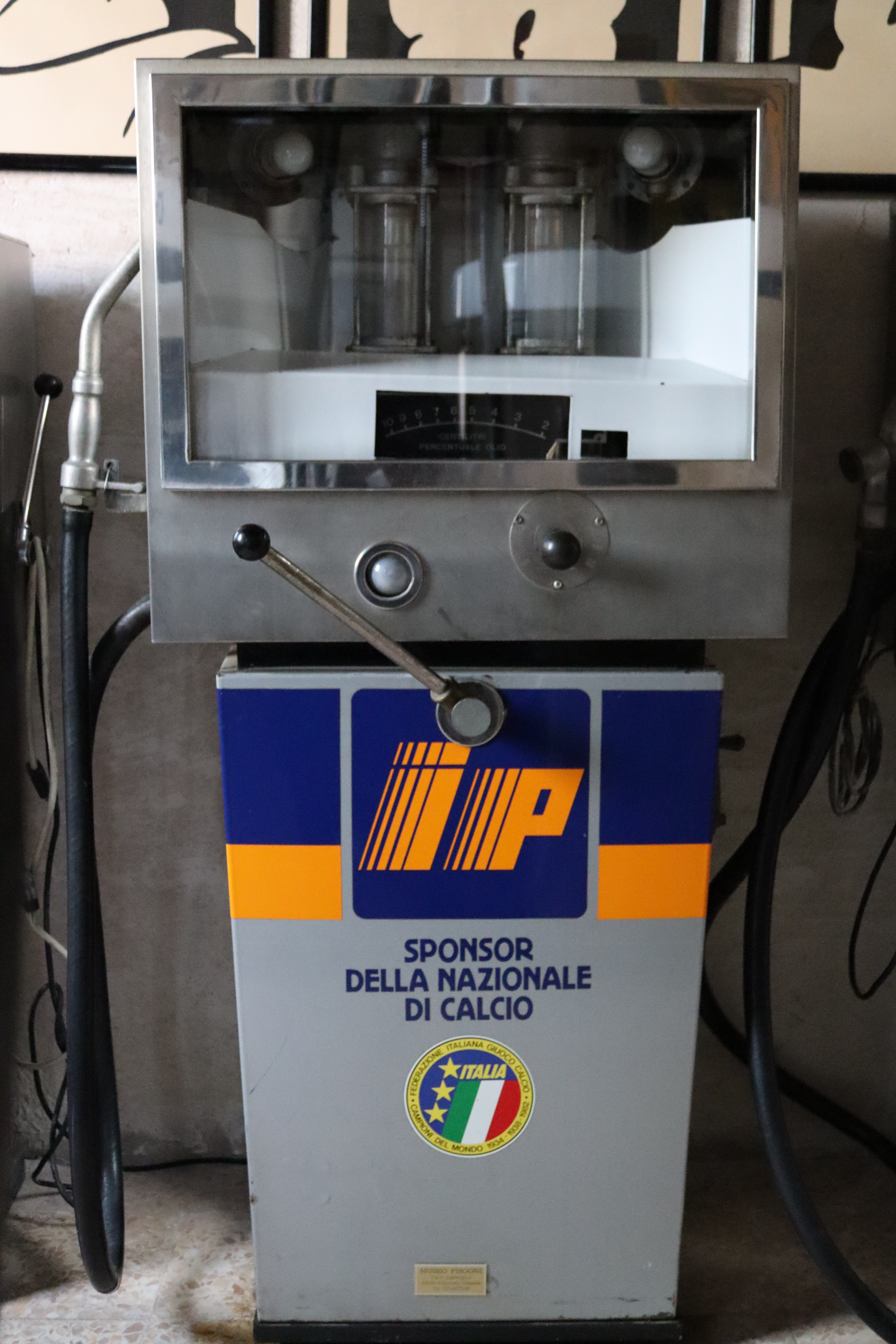
An IP distributor from the 1980s showing the advertising link with the Italy national team.

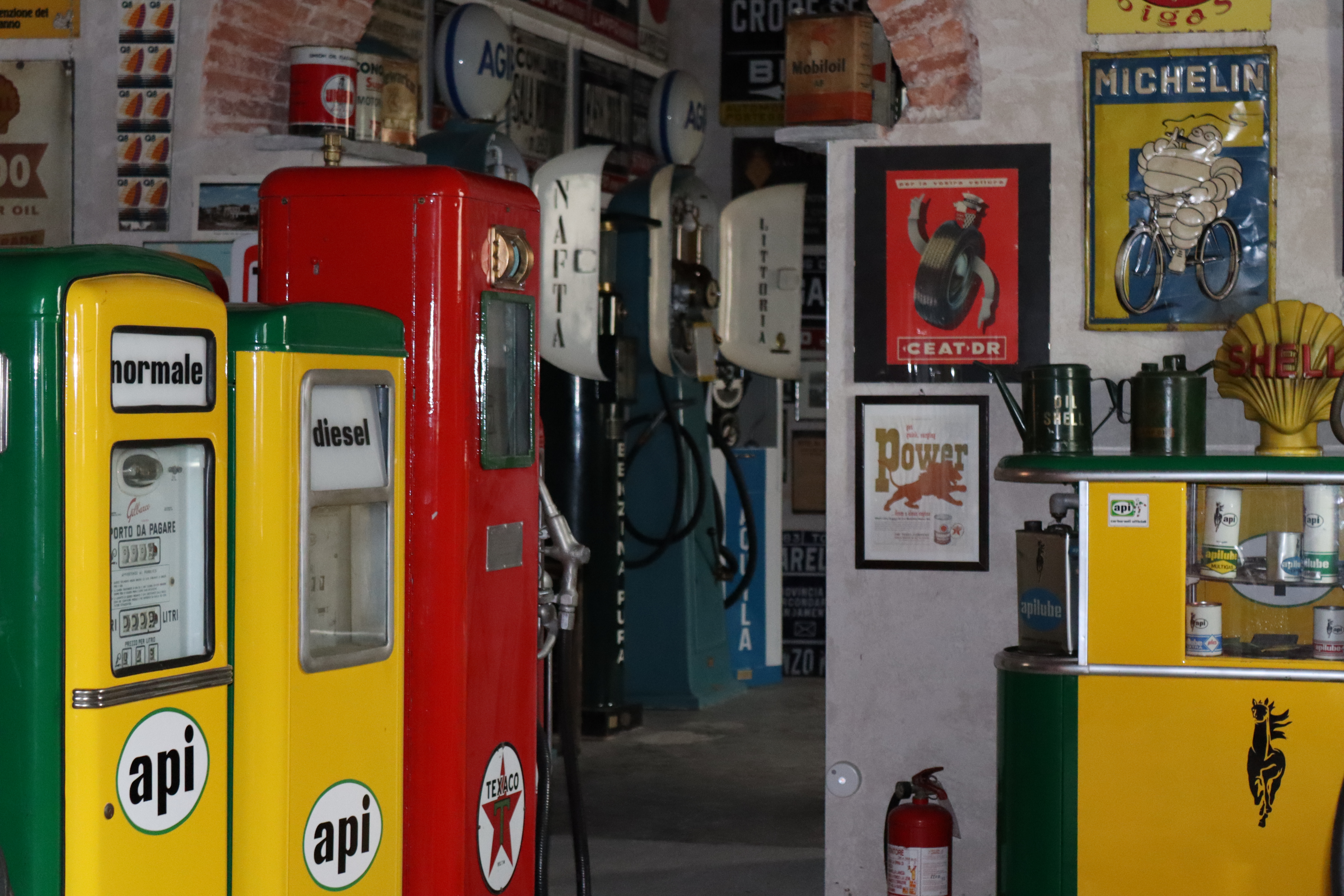
API 1950s fuel pump.

=== Logos ===
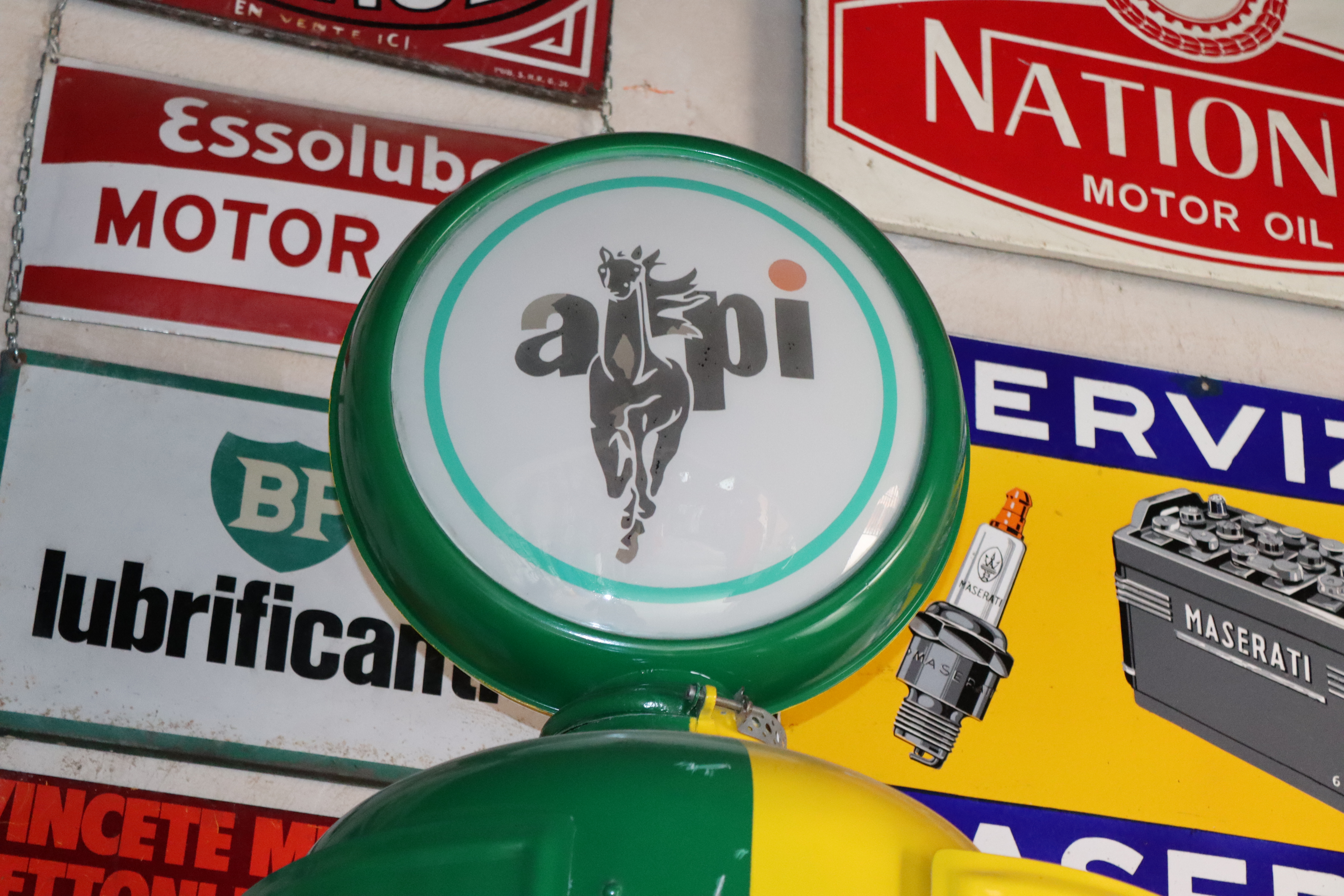
A "globe" with the historical API logo on an old petrol pump preserved at the Fisogni Museum.

New API logo (no longer in use since 2019).

New Gruppo API logo.

New IP Gruppo API logo.

IPlanet logo.
