= NEO Energy =

Private equity-backed oil and gas corporation

- Company type: Private
- Industry: Petroleum
- Founded: July 2019; 6 years ago
- Headquarters: London, UK
- Area served: United Kingdom
- Key people: Paul Harris (CEO)
- Number of employees: 204
- Website: neweuropeanoffshore.com

NEO Energy is a UK-based offshore oil and gas company operating on the United Kingdom Continental Shelf in the North Sea. In 2025, the company adopted the name NEO NEXT Energy following its merger with Repsol Resources UK, forming the larger NEO NEXT group.

== History ==
Founded in July 2019, it merged with another oil and gas producer in the region, Verus Petroleum, three months later; both companies were backed by the Norwegian private equity firm HitecVision. NEO Energy produced 80,999 barrels of oil equivalent on average per day in 2022.

The firm has been described as part of a group of new entrants to the UK offshore industry following the 2014 price crash, with others including Neptune Energy, Harbour Energy's Chrysaor, Zennor Petroleum, and Ithaca Energy-owned Siccar Point Energy.

NEO Energy was listed by Grant Thornton's 2024 Scotland Limited report as the highest-earning private company in Scotland in 2024 before interest, tax, depreciation and amortisation (EBITDA), up from 26th the previous year, and the second-highest by turnover. It did not appear in the top five companies by number of employees.

On July 30, 2025, it was announced that the company had merged with Repsol Resources UK, a unit of the Spanish multinational Repsol. It was also announced that the joint venture would be called NEO NEXT Energy Limited.

In December 2025, TotalEnergies announced the merger of its North Sea oil and gas assets with Neo Next Energy, resulting in the creation of a new entity, Neo Next+. TotalEnergies retains a significant minority stake in the company. The merger aims to consolidate operations and strengthen the position of one of the leading independent producers in the North Sea.

== Acquisitions ==
HitecVision's North Sea Opportunity Fund reportedly taps US capital for investments in UK and Norwegian offshore operations. Prior to 2021, the private equity firm developed a $2 billion loan facility secured against its undeveloped reserves.

The company acquired some of Total UK's North Sea assets in August 2020. It completed an acquisition of Zennor Petroleum on 12 July 2021 for up to $625 million. On 9 December 2021, it acquired a portfolio of ExxonMobil assets for more than $1 billion.

On 30 March 2022, it acquired JX Nippon Exploration and Production (U.K.) Limited for $1.66 billion. In October 2022, it acquired a 45 percent stake in the North Sea Isolde prospect from Equinor. In November 2023, it was announced that NEO would acquire the 'Western Isles' floating production storage and offloading vessel from Dana Petroleum for an undisclosed amount.

== Operations ==
In 2023, NEO Energy was the sixth-largest oil producer in the North Sea. On 31 January 2024, the UK's North Sea Transition Authority announced the company would be awarded licenses in the second tranche of the 33rd licensing round. On 3 May 2024, NEO was allocated two blocks in the third tranche of the round.

== Controversies ==
The North Sea Transition Authority fined NEO £100,000 in April 2024 for venting more than four times its permitted quantity of gas for the calendar year 2022. The company was originally granted 1.035 tons of venting per day, equivalent to just under 378 tons per year, for the Donan, Lochranza, and Balloch fields combined. However, when it identified the issue on 1 November 2022, it had already exceeded the venting consent by approximately 1,200 tons through cold flaring. The NSTA said NEO had incorrectly allocated its permitted quantity of venting, or the controlled release of hydrocarbon-containing gases into the atmosphere, to its consent for flaring.
