= Subsidiaries and affiliates of TotalEnergies =

Including locations

As of 31 December 2013 TotalEnergies had 898 subsidiaries consolidated into the group results, together with significant affiliate investments and joint ventures, mostly in LPG. In addition Total had other significant equity holdings amounting to about 3bn euros, treated as investments and was involved in a number of significant joint ventures, mostly relating to LPG and LNG exploration, production and shipping. The joint ventures that are treated as subsidiaries are listed in the consolidated subsidiary section.

During the full-scale Russian invasion of Ukraine, starting in 2022 many energy companies divested rom Russia and Belarus.

Note: "E&P" stands for "Exploration and Production".

== Main consolidated subsidiaries ==
1. Abu Dhabi Gas Liquefaction Company Ltd (5.00%), United Arab Emirates
2. Air Total International S.A., Switzerland
3. Amyris Inc. (17.88%), United States
4. Angola Block 14 B.V. (50.01%), Netherlands (operating in Angola)
5. Angola LNG Limited (13.60%), Bermuda (operating in Angola)
6. Arctic LNG 2 (10%), Russia
7. AS 24, France
8. Atlantic Trading & Marketing Inc., United States
9. Atotech (China) Chemicals Ltd
10. Atotech B.V., Netherlands
11. Atotech Deutschland GmbH, Germany
12. Atotech Taiwan
13. BASF Total Petrochemicals LLC (40.00%), United States
14. Bostik Holding S.A., France
15. Bostik Inc., United States
16. Bostik Ltd, United Kingdom
17. Bostik S.A., France
18. Brass Holdings Company Limited, Luxembourg
19. Brass LNG Ltd (17.00%), Nigeria
20. Compagnie Pétrolière de l’Ouest - CPO, France
21. Cos-Mar Company (50.00%), United States
22. Cosden LLC, United States
23. Cray Valley USA LLC, United States
24. CSSA – Chartering and Shipping Services S.A., Switzerland
25. Dalian West Pacific Petrochemical Co. Ltd (WEPEC) (22.41%), China
26. Dolphin Energy Limited (24.50%), United Arab Emirates
27. E. F. Oil And Gas Limited, United Kingdom
28. Elf Aquitaine S.A., France
29. Elf Aquitaine Fertilisants, France
30. Elf Aquitaine Inc., United States
31. Elf Exploration Production, France
32. Elf Exploration UK Limited, United Kingdom
33. Elf Petroleum Iran, France (operating in Iran)
34. Elf Petroleum UK Limited, United Kingdom
35. Gaz Transport & Technigaz S.A.S. (30.00%), France
36. Grande Paroisse S.A., France
37. Hutchinson Argentina S.A.
38. Hutchinson Autopartes De Mexico SA.DE. CV
39. Hutchinson Corporation, United States
40. Hutchinson Do Brasil S.A., Brazil
41. Hutchinson GmbH, Germany
42. Hutchinson Poland SP Z.O.O.
43. Hutchinson S.A., France
44. Ichthys LNG PTY Ltd (30.00%), Australia
45. Legacy Site Services LLC, United States
46. LSS Funding Inc., United States
47. Naphtachimie (50.00%), France
48. Nigeria LNG Ltd (15.00%)
49. Novatek (16.96%), Russia
50. Oman LNG LLC (5.54%)
51. Omnium Reinsurance Company S.A., Switzerland
52. Paulstra SNC, France
53. PetroCedeño (30.32%), Venezuela
54. Qatar Liquefied Gas Company Limited (II) Train B (16.70%)
55. Qatar Petrochemical Company Q.S.C. (QAPCO) (20.00%)
56. Qatargas Liquefied Gas Company Limited (10.00%)
57. Qatofin Company Limited (49.09%), Qatar
58. Samsung Total Petrochemicals Co. Ltd (50.00%), South Korea
59. Saudi Aramco Total Refining and Petrochemical Company (37.50%), Saudi Arabia
60. Shtokman Development AG (25.00%), Switzerland (operating in Russia)
61. Sigmakalon Group B.V., Netherlands
62. SOCAP S.A.S., France
63. Société Anonyme de la Raffinerie des Antilles (50.00%), France
64. Société Civile Immobilière CB2, France
65. SOFAX Banque, France
66. SunPower Corporation (64.65%), United States
67. Total (BTC) S.A.R.L., Luxembourg
68. Total Énergie Développement, France
69. Total Énergie Gaz, France
70. Total Énergies Nouvelles Activités USA, France
71. Total Austral, France (operating in Argentina)
72. Total Belgium
73. Total Capital, France
74. Total Capital Canada Ltd
75. Total Capital International, France
76. Total China Investment Co. Ltd
77. Total Coal South Africa (PTY) Ltd
78. Total Colombia Pipeline, France (operating in Colombia)
79. Total Delaware Inc., United States
80. Total Deutschland GmbH, Germany
81. Total Dolphin Midstream Limited, Bermuda
82. Total Downstream UK PLC, United Kingdom
83. Total E&P Absheron B.V., Netherlands (operating in Azerbaijan)
84. Total E&P Algerie, France (operating in Algeria)
85. Total E&P Angola, France (operating in Angola)
86. Total E&P Angola Block 15 / 06 Limited, Bermuda (operating in Angola)
87. Total E&P Angola Block 17 / 06, France (operating in Angola)
88. Total E&P Angola Block 25, France (operating in Angola)
89. Total E&P Angola Block 32, France (operating in Angola)
90. Total E&P Angola Block 33, France (operating in Angola)
91. Total E&P Angola Block 39, France (operating in Angola)
92. Total E&P Angola Block 40, France (operating in Angola)
93. Total E&P Arctic Russia, France
94. Total E&P Australia, France (operating in Australia)
95. Total E&P Australia II, France (operating in Australia)
96. Total E&P Australia III, France (operating in Australia)
97. Total E&P Azerbaijan B.V., Netherlands (operating in Azerbaijan)
98. Total E&P Bolivie, France (operating in Bolivia)
99. Total E&P Borneo B.V., Netherlands (operating in Brunei)
100. Total E&P Bulgaria B.V., The Netherlands (operating in Bulgaria)
101. Total E&P Canada Ltd
102. Total E&P Chine, France (operating in China)
103. Total E&P Colombie, France (operating in Colombia)
104. Total E&P Congo (85.00%)
105. Total E&P Cyprus B.V., The Netherlands (operating in Cyprus)
106. Total E&P Do Brasil LTDA, Brazil
107. Total E&P Dolphin Upstream Limited, Bermuda (operating in Qatar)
108. Total E&P France
109. Total E&P Golfe Holdings Limited, Bermuda
110. Total E&P Golfe Limited, United Arab (operating in Emirates Qatar)
111. Total E&P Guyane Francaise, France
112. Total E&P Holdings, France
113. Total E&P Ichthys, France (operating in Australia)
114. Total E&P Ichthys B.V., Netherlands (operating in Australia)
115. Total E&P Indonesia West Papua, France (operating in Indonesia)
116. Total E&P Indonesie, France (operating in Indonesia)
117. Total E&P Iraq, France (operating in Iraq)
118. Total E&P Italia S.p.A., Italy
119. Total E&P Kazakhstan, France (operating in Kazakhstan)
120. Total E&P Kenya B.V., Netherlands (operating in Kenya)
121. Total E&P Kurdistan Region of Iraq (Harir) B.V., Netherlands (operating in Iraq)
122. Total E&P Kurdistan Region of Iraq (Safen) B.V., Netherlands (operating in Iraq)
123. Total E&P Libye, France (operating in Libya)
124. Total E&P Madagascar, France (operating in Madagascar)
125. Total E&P Malaysia, France (operating in Malaysia)
126. Total E&P Maroc, France (operating in Morocco)
127. Total E&P Mauritanie, France (operating in Mauritania)
128. Total E&P Mauritanie Block TA29 B.V., Netherlands (operating in Mauritania)
129. Total E&P Mozambique B.V., Netherlands (operating in Mozambique)
130. Total E&P Myanmar, France (operating in Myanmar)
131. Total E&P Nederland B.V., Netherlands
132. Total E&P Nigeria Deepwater D Limited
133. Total E&P Nigeria Deepwater E Limited
134. Total E&P Nigeria Ltd
135. Total E&P Norge AS, Norway
136. Total E&P Oman, France (operating in Oman)
137. Total E&P Qatar, France (operating in Qatar)
138. Total E&P Russie, France (operating in Russia)
139. Total E&P South Africa B.V., Netherlands (operating in South Africa)
140. Total E&P South East Mahakam, France (operating in Indonesia)
141. Total E&P Syrie, France (operating in Syria)
142. Total E&P Thailand, France (operating in Thailand)
143. Total E&P Uganda B.V., Netherlands (operating in Uganda)
144. Total E&P UK Limited, United Kingdom
145. Total E&P Uruguay B.V., Netherlands (operating in Uruguay)
146. Total E&P USA Inc., United States
147. Total E&P Vietnam, France (operating in Vietnam)
148. Total E&P Yamal, France
149. Total E&P Yemen, France (operating in Yemen)
150. Total Especialidades Argentina
151. Total Exploration M’Bridge B.V., Netherlands (operating in Angola)
152. Total Exploration Production Nigeria, France
153. Total Finance, France
154. Total Finance Exploitation, France
155. Total Finance Global Services S.A., Belgium
156. Total Finance USA Inc., United States
157. Total Funding Nederland B.V., Netherlands
158. Total Gabon (58.28%)
159. Total Gas & Power Actifs Industriels, France
160. Total Gas & Power Limited, United Kingdom
161. Total Gas & Power North America Inc., United States
162. Total Gasandes, France
163. Total Gaz & Électricité Holdings France
164. Total Gestion Filiales, France
165. Total Gestion USA, France
166. Total GLNG Australia, France (operating in Australia)
167. Total Guinea Ecuatorial (80.00%), Equatorial Guinea
168. Total Holding Asie, France
169. Total Holding Dolphin Amont Limited, Bermuda
170. Total Holdings Europe S.A.S., France
171. Total Holdings International B.V., Netherlands
172. Total Holdings Nederland B.V., Netherlands
173. Total Holdings UK Limited, United Kingdom
174. Total Holdings USA Inc., United States
175. Total International N.V., Netherlands
176. Total Kenya (93.96%)
177. Total Lindsey Oil Refinery Ltd, United Kingdom
178. Total LNG Angola, France
179. Total LNG Nigeria Ltd, Bermuda
180. Total Lubrifiants (99.98%), France
181. Total Marketing Middle East Free Zone, United Arab Emirates
182. Total Marketing Services, France
183. Total Maroc, Morocco
184. Total Midstream Holdings UK Limited, United Kingdom
185. Total Mineraloel Und Chemie GmbH, Germany
186. Total Oil And Gas South America, France
187. Total Oil And Gas Venezuela B.V., Netherlands (operating in Venezuela)
188. Total Oil Turkiye AS, Turkey
189. Total Olefins Antwerp, Belgium
190. Total Outre-Mer, France
191. Total Participations Pétrolières Gabon
192. Total Petrochemicals & Refining S.A. / NV, Belgium
193. Total Petrochemicals & Refining USA Inc., United States
194. Total Petrochemicals France
195. Total Petroleum Angola, France (operating in Angola)
196. Total Profils Pétroliers, France
197. Total Qatar Oil And Gas, France
198. Total Raffinaderij Antwerpen N.V., Belgium
199. Total Raffinage Chimie, France
200. Total Raffinage France
201. Total Raffinerie Mitteldeutschland GmbH, Germany
202. Total S.A., France
203. Total Shtokman B.V., Netherlands
204. Total South Africa (PTY) Ltd (50.10%)
205. Total Specialties USA Inc., United States
206. Total Treasury, France
207. Total UK Finance Ltd, United Kingdom
208. Total UK Limited, United Kingdom
209. Total Upstream Nigeria Limited
210. Total Upstream UK Limited, United Kingdom
211. Total Venezuela, France
212. Total Vostok, Russia
213. Total Yemen LNG Company Limited, Bermuda
214. TotalErg S.p.A., Italy
215. TOTSA Total Oil Trading S.A., Switzerland
216. Yamal LNG (33.59%), Russia
217. Yemen LNG Company Ltd (39.62%), Bermuda (operating in Yemen)
218. Zeeland Refinery N.V. (55.00%), Netherlands
