= TotalEnergies =

French multinational energy and petroleum company

TotalEnergies SE

- Tour Total in Courbevoie, France, the headquarters of TotalEnergies
- Formerly: Compagnie Française des Pétroles (1924–1985); Total CFP (1985–1991); Total S.A. (1991–1999; 2003–2019); TotalFina S.A. (1999–2000); TotalFinaElf S.A. (2000–2003); Total SE (2020–2021)
- Type: Public
- Traded as: Euronext Paris: TTE; NYSE: TTE; CAC 40 component
- ISIN: FR0000120271
- Industry: Energy; Oil and gas; Renewable energy; Power generation
- Founded: 28 March 1924; 102 years ago
- Founder: Ernest Mercier
- Headquarters: Tour Total, Courbevoie, France
- Area served: Worldwide
- Key people: Patrick Pouyanné (chairman & CEO)
- Products: Petroleum; Natural gas; LNG; Petrochemicals; Biofuels; Solar power; Wind power
- Services: Fuel stations; Power generation and retail; EV charging; Energy trading
- Revenue: ▼US$201.2 billion (2025)
- Operating income: ▼US$19.93 billion (2025)
- Net income: ▲US$13.66 billion (2025)
- Total assets: ▼US$291.0 billion (2025)
- Total equity: ▲US$117.5 billion (2025)
- Number of employees: 101,513 (2025)
- Website: www.totalenergies.com

TotalEnergies SE is a French multinational integrated energy and petroleum company founded in 1924 and is one of the seven supermajor oil companies. Its businesses cover the entire oil and gas chain, from crude oil and natural gas exploration and production to power generation, transportation, refining, petroleum product marketing, and international crude oil and product trading. TotalEnergies is also a large-scale chemicals manufacturer.

TotalEnergies has its head office in the Tour Total in La Défense district in Courbevoie, west of Paris. The company is a component of the Euro Stoxx 50 stock market index. In the 2023 Forbes Global 2000, TotalEnergies was ranked as the 21st largest company in the world.

Big Oil companies (2021) (Note: Data is based on the 2022 Fortune 500.)
Company	Revenue (USD bn)	Profit (USD bn)	Brands
ExxonMobil	286	23	Mobil; Esso; Imperial Oil
Shell plc	273	20	Jiffy Lube; Pennzoil
TotalEnergies	185	16	Elf Aquitaine; SunPower
BP	164	7.6	Amoco; Aral AG
Chevron	163	16	Texaco; Caltex; Havoline
Marathon	141	10	ARCO
Phillips 66	115	1.3	76; Conoco; JET
Valero	108	0.9	—N/a
Eni	77	5.8	—N/a
ConocoPhillips	48.3	8.1	—N/a

== History ==
=== 1924–1985: Compagnie Française des Pétroles ===
The company was founded after World War I, when petrol was seen as vital in case of a new war with Germany. The then–French President Raymond Poincaré rejected the idea of forming a partnership with Royal Dutch Shell in favour of creating an entirely French oil company. At Poincaré's behest in 1924 Col. Ernest Mercier, with the support of 90 banks and companies, founded the Compagnie Française des Pétroles (CFP) (in English, the French Petroleum Company).

As per the agreement reached during the San Remo conference of 1920, the French state received the 25% share held by Deutsche Bank in the Turkish Petroleum Company (TPC) as part of the compensation for war damages caused by Germany during World War I. The French government's stake in TPC was transferred to CFP, and the Red Line agreement in 1928 rearranged the shareholding of CFP in TPC (later renamed the Iraq Petroleum Company in 1929) to 23.75%. The company from the start was regarded as a private sector company in view of its listing on the Paris Stock Exchange in 1929.

During the 1930s, the company was engaged in exploration and production, primarily from the Middle East. Its first refinery began operating in Normandy in 1933. After World War II, CFP engaged in oil exploration in Venezuela, Canada, and Africa while pursuing energy sources within France. Exploration in Algeria, then a French colony, began in 1946, with Algeria becoming a leading source of oil in the 1950s.

In 1954 CFP branded its downstream products as Total in Africa and Europe.

Total entered the United States in 1971 by acquiring Leonard Petroleum of Alma, Michigan and several Standard Oil of Indiana stations in Metro Detroit.

In 1980, Total Petroleum (North America) Ltd., a company controlled 50% by CFP, bought the American refining and marketing assets of Vickers Petroleum as part of a sell-off by Esmark of its energy holdings. This purchase gave Total refining capacity, transportation, and a network of 350 service stations in 20 states.

=== 1985–2003: Total CFP and rebranding to Total ===
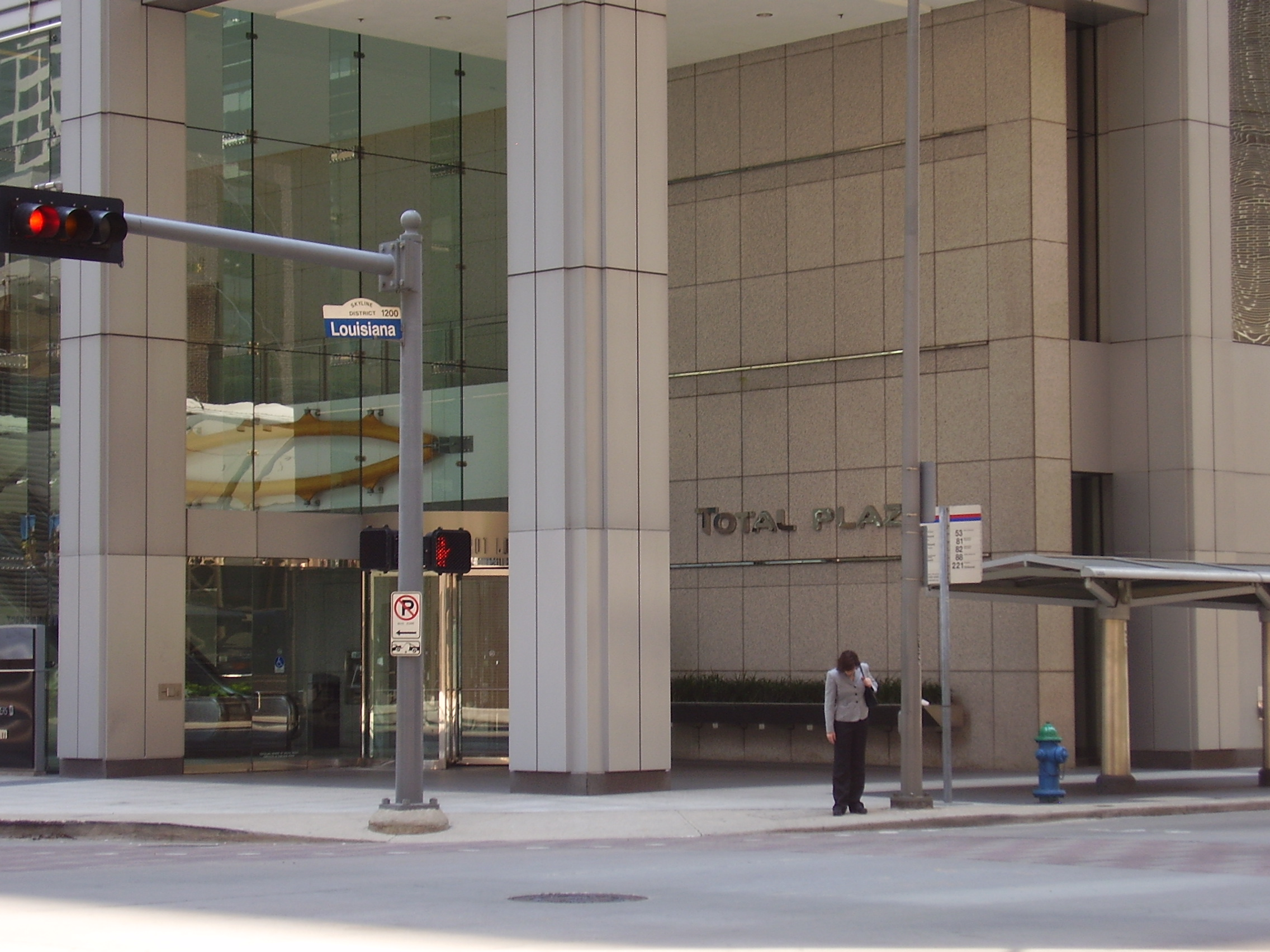
Total Plaza, the headquarters of the subsidiary Total Petrochemicals USA, in Downtown Houston

The company renamed itself Total CFP in 1985, to build on the popularity of its gasoline brand. Later in 1991, the name was changed to Total, when it became a public company listed on the New York Stock Exchange. In 1991, the French government held more than 30 percent of the company's stock but by 1996 had reduced its stake to less than 1 percent. In the period between 1990 and 1994, foreign ownership of the firm increased from 23 percent to 44 percent.

Total continued to expand its retail presence in North America under several brand names. In 1989, Denver, Colorado–based Total Petroleum, Total CFP's North American unit, purchased 125 Road Runner retail locations from Texarkana, Texas–based Truman Arnold Companies. By 1993, Total Petroleum was operating 2,600 retail stores under the Vickers, Apco, Road Runner, and Total brands. That year, the company began remodeling and rebranding all of its North American gasoline and convenience stores to use the Total name. Four years later, Total sold its North American refining and retail operations to Ultramar Diamond Shamrock for $400 million in stock and $414 million in assumed debt.

In 1996, the Girassol oil field was discovered and operated by TotalEnergies SE. After Total's takeover of Petrofina of Belgium in 1999, it became known as Total Fina. Afterwards, it also acquired Elf Aquitaine. First named TotalFinaElf after the merger in 2000, its name reverted to Total in 2003. During that rebranding, the globe logo was unveiled.

Total's leadership had been aware of the deleterious effects of global warming since at least 1971; The company nevertheless openly denied the findings of climate science until the 1990s; Total also pursued a number of strategies to cover up the threat and contribution to climate change.

=== 2003–2021 ===
In 2003, Total signed for a 30% stake in the gas exploration venture in the Kingdom of Saudi Arabia (KSA) – South Rub' al-Khali joint venture along with Royal Dutch Shell and Saudi Aramco. The stake was later bought out by its partners.

In 2006, Saudi Aramco and Total signed a memorandum of understanding to develop the Jubail Refinery and Petrochemical project in Saudi Arabia which targeted 400,000 barrels per day (bpd). Two years later, the two companies officially established a joint venture called Saudi Aramco Total Refining and Petrochemical Company (SATORP) in which a 62.5% stake was held by Saudi Aramco and the balance 37.5% held by Total.

Total withdrew in 2006 from all Iranian development work because of United Nations concerns that resulted in sanctions over possible weaponization of the nuclear program of Iran.

During the 2009–2010 Iraqi oil services contracts tender, a consortium led by CNPC (37.5%), which also included TOTAL (18.75%) and Petronas (18.75%) was awarded a production contract for the "Halfaya field" in the south of Iraq, which contains an estimated 4.1 billion barrels (650,000,000 m^{3}) of oil.

In 2010 Total and Erg merged their respective subsidiaries Total Italia and Erg Petroli, forming TotalErg, 49% controlled by the French group and 51% by the Italian one. As of 2010, Total had over 96,000 employees and operated in more than 130 countries. In 2010, Total announced plans to pull out of the forecourt market in the United Kingdom.

In 2012, Total announced it was selling its 20% stake and operating mandate in its Nigerian offshore project to a unit of China Petrochemical Corp for $2.5 billion.

In 2013, Total started the operation at Kashagan with North Caspian Operating Company. It is the biggest discovery of oil reserves since 1968. In 2013, Total increased its stake in Novatek to 16.96%. In 2013, Total and its joint venture partner agreed to buy Chevron Corporation's retail distribution business in Pakistan for an undisclosed amount.

In January 2014, Total became the first major oil and gas firm to acquire exploration rights for shale gas in the UK after it bought a 40 percent interest in two licences in the Gainsborough Trough area of northern England for $48 million. In July 2014, the company disclosed it was in talks to sell its LPG distribution business in France to Pennsylvania-based UGI Corporation for €450 million ($615 million).

On 20 October 2014, at 23:57 MST, a Dassault Falcon 50 business jet heading to Paris caught fire and exploded during takeoff after colliding with a snow removal vehicle in Vnukovo International Airport, killing four, including three crew members and CEO of Total S.A. Christophe de Margerie on board. Alcohol presence was confirmed in the blood of the driver of the vehicle on the ground. Patrick Pouyanne, who was Total's Refining Chief at that time, was appointed as CEO, and also as chairman of Total in 2015.

In 2015, Total unveiled plans to cut 180 jobs in the United Kingdom, reduce refinery capacity and slow spending on North Sea fields after it fell to a $5.7bn final-quarter loss. The company said it would also sell off $5bn worth of assets worldwide and cut exploration costs by 30%. In 2016, Total signed a $224M deal to buy Lampiris, the third-largest Belgian supplier of gas and renewable energy to expand its gas and power distribution activities. In 2016, Total bought French battery maker Saft Groupe S.A. in a $1.1bn deal, to boost its development in renewable energy and electricity businesses. In 2016, Total agreed to acquire $2.2-billion in upstream and downstream assets from Petrobras as part of the firms' strategic alliance announced earlier that year. For Total, these new partnerships with Petrobras reinforce Total's position in Brazil through access to new fields in the Santos Basin while entering the gas value chain. Between 2013 and 2017, Total organized the ARGOS Challenge, a robotic competition with the aim to develop robots for its oil and gas production sites. It was won by an Austrian-German team using a variant of the taurob tracker robot.

In 2017, Total signed a deal for a total amount of $4.8b with Iran for the development and production of South Pars, the world's largest gas field. The deal was the first foreign investment in Iran since in the 2015 sanctions over Iran's nuclear weaponisation were lifted by the JCPOA. In 2017, Total announced the acquisition of Maersk Oil for $7.45 billion in a share and debt transaction. This deal positioned Total as the second operator in the North Sea. In 2017, Total signed an agreement with EREN Renewable energy to acquire an interest of 23% in EREN RE for an amount of €237.5 million. In November 2017, Total announced the launch on the French residential market of Total Spring, a natural gas and green power offering that is 10% cheaper than regulated tariffs. Total is thus pursuing its strategy of downstream integration in the gas and power value chain in Europe.

On 10 January 2018 TotalErg was acquired by Gruppo API, with the exception of the Special Fluids division, acquired by the newly formed Total Italia. In 2018, Total officially withdrew from the Iranian South Pars gas field because of sanctions pressure from the US.

In 2019, Total announced the sale of a 30% stake in the Trapil pipeline network to crude oil storage operator Pisto SAS for €260 million. Later that year, Total signed deals to transfer 30% and 28.33% of its assets in Namibia's Block 2913B and Block 2912 respectively to QatarEnergy. The company will also transfer 40% of its existing 25% interests in the Orinduik and Kanuku blocks of Guyana and 25% interest in Blocks L11A, L11B, and L12 of Kenya to QatarEnergy.

In July 2020 the company changed its name from Total SA to Total SE as part of registration as a European company. In 2020, the company announced its intention to cut 500 voluntary jobs in France.

In 2021, Total left the American Petroleum Institute lobby, due to differences in the common vision of how to tackle the fight against climate change. In 2021, Total said that it had registered an income of $3 billion for the period of January–March, which is close to the levels registered before the pandemic.

=== 2021–present: Rebranding to TotalEnergies ===
In 2021, the company announced a name change to TotalEnergies as an intended illustration of its investments in the production of green electricity. At the Ordinary and Extraordinary Shareholders' Meeting in May of that year, shareholders approved the name change to TotalEnergies.

In 2022, TotalEnergies announced it would end all operations in Myanmar, citing rampant human rights abuses and deteriorating rule of law since the 2021 Myanmar coup d'état and has also called for international sanctions targeting the oil and gas sector in the country, which is one of the main sources of revenue for Myanmar's government. As of 11 March 2022, Total was one of the only Western oil companies to continue operating in Russia after the Russian Invasion of Ukraine. In June 2022, TotalEnergies signed a partnership with QatarEnergy for the world's largest LNG expansion project, the North Field East (NFE). Holding the largest stake, 6.25%, TotalEnergies will hold the equivalent of one of the four trains. In September 2022, an additional agreement was signed to include the North Field South (NFS) which is the second phase of the NFE. This gave TotalEnergies a stake of 9.375% of the 25% stakes available to international companies.

On 30 March 2023, Total sold a shipment of LNG which it sourced from UAE to CNOOC on the Shanghai Petroleum and Natural Gas Exchange. It was reportedly the first trade to be settled in the renminbi (Chinese yuan) currency on the SHPGX. In July 2023, Iraq signed a $27 billion energy agreement with TotalEnergies to develop the country's energy sector and boost output of oil, gas and renewables. Additionally, Indian Oil Corp, has signed liquefied natural gas (LNG) import deals with ADNOC LNG and TotalEnergies in the same month. In October 2023, TotalEnergies sold its Canadian operations to Suncor Energy for C$1.47 billion($1.07 billion). TotalEnergies has agreed to buy liquefied natural gas from Qatar for 27 years, cementing the European nation's commitment to fossil fuels beyond 2050. In 2023, Total invested $300 million in a renewable energy joint venture with Adani Green Energy. The joint venture's portfolio capacity is 1,050 MW - 300 MW of operating capacity, 500 MW of solar projects under construction and 250 MW of projects under development, as well as solar and wind power projects in India. At the end of January 2024, TotalEnergies reached an agreement with OMV to purchase a 50% stake in its joint venture in Malaysia (SapuraOMV) for $903 million. The deal includes the repayment of a $350 million loan from OMV to the joint venture.

On 21 February 2024, TotalEnergies and Airbus entered a strategic partnership to meet emission-reduction goals through the use of sustainable aviation fuels (SAF). TotalEnergies will provide more than 50% of Airbus' European fuel requirements. Compared to fossil fuels, SAF can reduce CO_{2} emissions by up to 90%. TotalEnergies and QatarEnergy entered an agreement on 6 March 2024 to purchase participating interests in South Africa's Orange Basin offshore oil field. Under the agreement, TotalEnergies will have the exclusive right to operate its wells in Block 3B/4B with a 33% interest holding, while QatarEnergy will receive a 24% interest in the same block. On 22 April 2024, OmanLNG and TotalEnergies signed a deal in which OmanLNG will provide 800,000 metric tons of liquefied natural gas. On 14 November 2024, TotalEnergies announced that it will fill all of its upstream assets with real-time methane leak detection equipment by 2025 to help minimize the emissions. This is expected to help the company in its target of slashing methane emissions to nearly zero percent by 2030. On 15 November 2024, TotalEnergies, BP, Shell and Equinor promised to invest $500 million to increase the access to affordable energy, focusing primarily in sub-Saharan Africa, south and southeast Asia. This would include domestic solar energy systems, micro-electricity grids, energy production, transport, logistics and storage, e-mobility technologies, and modern cooking fuels such as liquefied petroleum gas (LPG). On 3 December 2024 TotalEnergies announced its plans to build a 0.3 gigawatt (GW) solar park in Saudi Arabia, while another leading company from France EDF has been assigned to build two solar parks with a total of 1.4 GW.

In January 2025, TotalEnergies sold all of its service stations in Mali to Coly Energy Mali, a subsidiary managed by the Beninese company Bénin Petro. On 18 February 2025, TotalEnergies confirmed its departure from Burkina Faso, after 70 years of presence, in Burkina Faso.

TotalEnergies was accused by the French court in October 2025 of having misled consumers with its environmental claims. They were told to remove messages of wanting to reach carbon neutrality by 2050 from the company website. It is the first time that the french "greenwashing" law has been imposed on a fossil fuel company.

In December 2025, the company terminated its ADR program and converted all ADRs into ordinary shares. As a reason, the company stated that the investor base is increasingly located in North America, with around 40.8% of the company being owned by North American investors, compared to 24.6% held by French investors, including employees.

In March 2026, the US President Donald Trump paid TotalEnergies $928 million to stop the wind project and fossil fuel investment planned for the US east cost. The money was reimbursed on the condition that it be used to reinvest in hydrocarbon projects.

In April 2026, TotalEnergies and UAE-based clean energy company Masdar signed a preliminary binding agreement to create a joint venture (JV) with each company owning 50% to combine some of their renewable energy activities across the Asia-Pacific (APAC) region.

On 16 June 2026 the European Commission granted, TotalEnergies and Masdar, clearance for the transaction. Valued at $2.2 billion, the Joint venture functions as an exclusive platform for both companies to develop, build, own, and operate onshore renewable energy projects in nine key Asian markets, including South Korea, Japan, Indonesia, and Azerbaijan. The deal combines 3 GW of existing operational renewable assets with a 6 GW development pipeline aimed for completion by 2030.

On 3 August 2026, TotalEnergies acquired Shell’s European onshore renewables portfolio, comprising 500 MW of operating and under-construction solar and wind assets. The transaction also included a 3.5 GW development pipeline across Europe.

In August 2026, TotalEnergies agreed to sell KKR a 50% stake in a 1.2 GW portfolio of onshore solar and wind assets across Germany, Spain, France and Poland. The transaction valued the portfolio at €1.8 billion, with TotalEnergies retaining the remaining 50% and continuing to operate the assets.

On 1 October, TotalEnergies announced plans to invest $10 billion in Argentina, primarily to expand oil and gas production. The investment includes new wells in Tierra del Fuego and increased gas production in Neuquén.

== Organization ==
=== Business trends ===
The key trends of TotalEnergies are (as at the financial year ending 31 December):

Year	Revenue (US$ bn)	Net income (US$ bn)	Assets (US$ bn)	Employees
2011	228	16.8	224	96,104
2012	249	14.6	235	97,126
2013	235	11.5	237	98,799
2014	212	4.2	229	100,307
2015	143	5.0	224	96,019
2016	127	6.1	230	102,168
2017	149	8.6	242	98,277
2018	184	11.4	256	104,460
2019	176	11.2	273	107,776
2020	119	–7.2	266	105,476
2021	184	16.0	293	101,309
2022	263	20.5	303	101,279
2023	237	21.3	283	101,279
2024	215	15.8	285	102,887
2025	201	13.1	291	101,513

=== Business segments ===
Headquarters of Total Cambodia in Phnom Penh (Cambodia)

TotalEnergies report its activities across Exploration & Production, Integrated Gas, Renewables & Power, Refining & Chemicals, and Marketing & Services.

In 2016 Total created two new corporate divisions: People & Social Responsibility (Human Resources; Health, Safety & Environment; the Security Division; and a new Civil Society Engagement Division) and Strategy & Innovation (Strategy & Climate Division, responsible for ensuring that strategy incorporates the 2 °C global warming scenario, Public Affairs, Audit, Research & Development, the Chief Digital Officer and the Senior Vice President Technology).

=== Head office ===
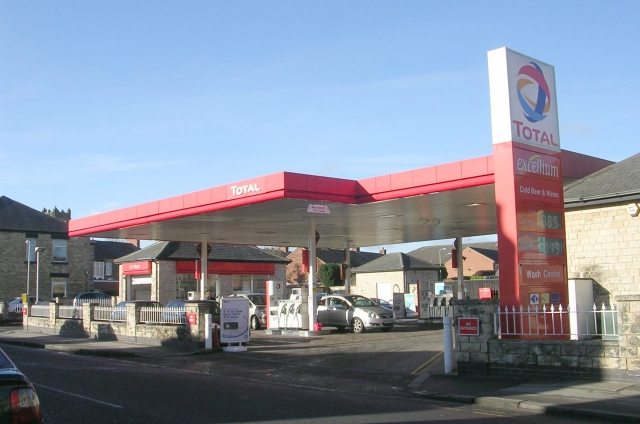
A total filling station in Wetherby, West Yorkshire

The company's headquarters is in the Tour Total in the La Défense district in Courbevoie, France, near Paris. The building was originally constructed between 1983 and 1985 for Elf Aquitaine; Total SA acquired the building after its merger with Elf in 2000.

== Subsidiaries ==
=== TotalEnergies Italia ===
Total Italia S.p.A. (originally Total Italia S.r.l.) is an Italian company that operates in the distribution of lubricants. It is a subsidiary of TotalEnergies SE.

It was founded in 2018 by the split of the Special Fluids branch from TotalErg in view of the acquisition by Gruppo API. It takes its name from the old Total Italia, dissolved in 2010 with the birth of TotalErg.

=== TotalEnergies Turkey ===
Güzel Enerji Akaryakıt A.Ş. is a Turkish company that operates under Licensee of TotalEnergies S.A.

After operating in Turkey under the international energy company TotalEnergies S.A. since 1992. In March 2020, the takeover process (from Demirören Holding) was completed and the stations are now operated by OYAK.

TotalEnergies Stations continues to serve as Turkey's 5th largest fuel company in the fuel sector with a network of more than 500 stations.

Güzel Enerji Akaryakıt A.Ş / Total provides storage and distribution services with modern fuel oil and LPG storage facilities with a total capacity of 300,000 m3 in Aliağa, Gebze and Samsun, and LPG storage facilities in Yarımca, Ankara and Aliağa.

TotalEnergies also plans to run Exploration operations on Black Sea with Turkish National Oil Company, TPAO.

It offers wide range of products like Elf Lubricants, Excellium Gasoline, Otojet Electric Charge Stations and Bi'Güzel Coffees, Sandwiches, Pastries, and Desserts.

Gasoline can be bought via Cash, Card, Mobile app and DKV Card.

Güzel Enerji Akaryakıt A.Ş. was also a sponsor of Turkish National Man and Woman Basketball teams.

== Operations ==
In May 2014, the company shelved its Joslyn North oil sands project in the Athabasca region of Alberta, Canada, indefinitely, citing concerns about operating costs. An estimated $11 billion has been spent on the project, in which Total is the largest shareholder with 38.5%. Suncor Energy holds 36.75%, Occidental Petroleum owns 15% and Japan's Inpex has a 10% interest.

Total is involved in 23 projects of exploration and production in Africa, Asia, Europe, North America, South America and Russia.

=== Investments ===
In 1937, Iraq Petroleum Company (IPC), 23.75 percent owned by Total, signed an oil concession agreement with the Sultan of Muscat. IPC offered financial support to raise an armed force that would assist the Sultan in occupying the interior region of Oman, an area that geologists believed to be rich in oil. This led to the 1954 outbreak of Jebel Akhdar War in Oman that lasted for more than 5 years.

Total has been a significant investor in the Iranian energy sector since 1990. In 2017, Total and the National Iranian Oil Company (NIOC) signed a contract for the development and production of South Pars, the world's largest gas field. The project will have a production capacity of 2 billion cubic feet per day. The produced gas will supply the Iranian domestic market starting in 2021.

During the European Union's sanctions against the military dictatorship Myanmar, Total is able to operate the Yadana natural gas pipeline from Burma to Thailand. Total is currently the subject of a lawsuit in French and Belgian courts for the condoning and use of the country's civilian slavery to construct the pipeline. The documentary 'Total Denial' shows the background of this project. The NGO Burma Campaign UK is currently campaigning against this project.

=== Acquisitions ===
In 2011, Total agreed to buy 60% of photovoltaics company SunPower for $1.38 billion. By the 2013 annual reporting date, Total owned 64.65%.

In 2016, Total agreed to purchase French battery maker Saft Groupe S.A. for €1.1 billion. In 2016, Total signed a $224 million deal to buy Lampiris, the third-largest Belgian supplier of gas and renewable energy to expand its gas and power distribution activities. In December 2016, Total acquired about 23% of Tellurian Inc. for an amount of $207 million, to develop an integrated gas project.

In 2017, Total announced it would buy Maersk Oil from A.P. Moller-Maersk in a deal expected to close in the first quarter of 2018. In 2018, Total announced it was buying 74% of the French electricity and gas provider Direct Énergie from their main stockholders, for €1.4 billion.

In 2022, Total announced it had added 4 GW to its renewable energy portfolio through the acquisition of the Austin-based company, Core Solar. The following month, Total entered an agreement with GIP to acquire a 50% stake in Clearway, one of the largest renewable energy owners in the United States. As part of the transaction, GIP took a 50% minus one share stake in SunPower.

In October 2023, TotalEnergies announced it was purchasing Quadra, a Germany-based clean energy aggregator, for an undisclosed amount. In 2023, TotalEnergies acquired three gas-fired power plants with a total capacity of 1.5 GW in Texas from TexGen for $635 million.

In 2025, TotalEnergies merged its North Sea oil and gas assets with those of Neo Next Energy to form a new entity, Neo Next+. The company holds a significant minority stake in the joint venture, which aims to streamline operations and enhance competitiveness in the mature North Sea basin.

=== Western Sahara oil exploration ===
A gas station in Casablanca in March 2026

In 2001, Total signed a contract for oil-reconnaissance in areas offshore Western Sahara (near Dakhla), with the Moroccan "Office National de Recherches et d'Exploitations Petrolières" (ONAREP). In 2002, Hans Corell (the United Nations Under-Secretary-General for Legal Affairs) stated in a letter to the president of the Security Council that whenever the contracts are only for exploration they're not illegal, but if further exploration or exploitation are against the interests and wishes of the people of Western Sahara, it would be in violation of the principles of international law.

Finally, Total decided to not renew its license off Western Sahara.

=== Energy Deal with ADNOC ===
In a move to cope with the 2021–2022 global energy crisis, which started with the onset of the COVID-19 pandemic and aggravated with Russia's 2022 invasion of Ukraine, France's TotalEnergies and UAE's ADNOC signed a strategic deal to partner on energy projects "for cooperation in the area of energy supplies".

The deal was secured on the second day of the UAE leader Sheikh Mohamed bin Zayed Al-Nahyan's visit to Paris in 2022. The visit marked the UAE president's first overseas state visit since assuming the post earlier that year.

The deal was aimed at identifying and targeting potential joint investment projects in the UAE, France, and elsewhere in the sectors of renewables, hydrogen, and nuclear energy, as told by the French government in one of its statements. According to French President Emmanuel Macron's aides, France had been eager to secure diesel supply from the UAE.

The deal also received criticism from human rights groups that pressured Macron not to give the then "crown prince a pass on the UAE's atrocious human rights record", per the statement published by Human Rights Watch on its website.

== Controversies ==
=== Environmental and safety records ===
In 1999, the Total SA company was fined €375,000 for the MV Erika oil spill that stretched 400 kilometers from La Rochelle to the western tip of Brittany. The company was only fined that amount because it was only partially liable because Total SA did not own the ship. The plaintiffs had sought more than $1.5 billion in damages. More than 100 groups and local governments joined in the suit. The Total company was fined just over $298,000. The majority of the money will go to the French government, several environmental groups, and various regional governments. The Total SA company was also fined $550,000 for the amount of marine pollution that came from it. After the oil spill it tried to restore its image and have opened a sea turtle conservation project in Masirah in recent years.

Prior to the verdict in which Total was found guilty one of the counterparts in the incident, Malta Maritime Authority (MMA), was not to be tried for having any hand in the incident. In 2005, Total submitted a report to the Paris courts which stated that Total had gathered a group of experts which stated the tanker was corroded and that Total was responsible for it. The courts sought a second expert reviewing this information, which was turned down.

In 2001, the AZF chemical plant exploded in Toulouse, France, while belonging to the Grande Paroisse branch of Total.

In 2008, Total was required to pay €192 million in compensation to victims of the pollution caused by the sinking of the ship MV Erika. This was in addition to the €200 million that Total spent to help clean up the spill. The company appealed twice against the verdict, losing both times.

In 2016, Total was ranked as the second-best of 92 oil, gas, and mining companies on indigenous rights in the Arctic. According to the CDP Carbon Majors Report 2017, the company was one of the top 100 companies producing carbon emissions globally, responsible for 0.9% of global emissions from 1998 to 2015. In 2021, Total was ranked as the 2nd most environmentally responsible company out of 120 oil, gas, and mining companies involved in resource extraction north of the Arctic Circle in the Arctic Environmental Responsibility Index (AERI).

According to a 2021 study, Total personnel were aware about the role that its products played in global warming as early as 1971, as well as throughout the 1980s. Despite this awareness, the company promoted doubt regarding the science of global warming by the late 1980s, and ultimately settled on a position in the late 1990s of publicly accepting climate science, while still promoting doubt and trying to delay climate action. In August 2024, South Africa's advertising regulator ruled that TotalEnergies' promotion of sustainability in an advertising campaign in the country was misleading. The campaign was run in collaboration with South Africa's nature conservation authority, Sanparks, to encourage people to visit the country's national parks.

=== Bribery ===
Total has been accused of bribery on multiple occasions.

Total is being implicated in a bribe commission scandal which is currently emerging in Malta. It has emerged that Total had told Maltese agents that it would not be interested in doing business with them unless their team included George Farrugia, who is under investigation in the procurement scandal. George Farrugia has recently been given a presidential pardon in exchange for information about this scandal. Enemalta, Malta's energy supplier, swiftly barred Total and its agents, Trafigura from bidding and tenders. An investigation is currently underway and three people have been arraigned.

On 16 December 2008, the managing director of the Italian division of Total, Lionel Levha, and ten other executives were arrested by the public Prosecutor's office of Potenza, Italy, for a corruption charge of €15 million to undertake the oilfield in Basilicata on contract. Also arrested was the local deputy of Partito Democratico Salvatore Margiotta and an Italian entrepreneur.

In 2010, Total was accused of bribing Iraqi officials during former president Saddam Hussein's regime to secure oil supplies. A United Nations report later revealed that Iraqi officials had received bribes from oil companies to secure contracts worth over $10bn. On 26 February 2016, the Paris Court of Appeals considered Total guilty and ordered the company to pay a fine of €750,000 for corrupting Iraqi civil servants. The court's ruling overturns an earlier acquittal in the case.

In 2013, a case was settled that concerned charges that Total bribed an Iranian official with $60 million, which it documented as a "consulting charge," and which unfairly gave it access to Iran's Sirri A and Sirri E oil and gas fields. The bribery gave it a competitive advantage, earning it an estimated $150 million in profits. The Securities Exchange Commission and the Department of Justice settled the charges, expecting Total to pay $398 million.

=== 2022 Russian invasion of Ukraine ===
Following the 2022 Russian invasion of Ukraine which began on 24 February, many international, particularly Western companies pulled out of Russia. On 1 March, TotalEnergies announced it "will no longer provide capital for new projects in Russia" but has retained ownership of its 19.4% stake in privately owned Novatek, 20% stake in the Yamal project and 10% stake in Arctic LNG 2. This has led to criticism as insufficient, particularly given complete divestment of other major Western energy companies, and the European Union announcement of becoming more energy independent from Russia. Similarly in August 2022, an investigation by Global Witness showed that a Siberian gas field part-owned by TotalEnergies has been supplying a refinery, which is producing jet fuel for Russian warplanes. This contradicts Total's claims that this was unrelated to Russian military operations in Ukraine. On 26 April 2024, while presenting the firm's interim financial report TotalEnergy CEO Patrick Pouyanne said that importing Russian LNG to EU is not a very profitable operation and if EU sanctions Russian LNG, the price of LNG will go up quickly and globally TotalEngergy's portfolio will benefit from it. According to a 2024 analysis done by IEEFA, despite EU sanctions, Russian LNG import to France almost doubled to 4.4 billion cubic meters in the first half of 2024 compared to the same period a year ago. On 30 September 2025, Patrick Pouyanne suggested that Russian liquefied natural gas shipments could be redirected to other countries like India and Turkey if the European Union bans imports while sparing a key facility in Russia.

=== Africa ===
In December 2022, the NGOs Friends of the Earth, Survie and four Ugandan NGOs sent the oil group Total to court and accused it of violating the law on the duty of vigilance of large French companies in terms of human rights and environment. The Tilenga Project, which TotalEnergies is undertaking in conjunction with China National Offshore Oil Corporation consists of drilling for oil in the Murchison Falls National Park, a habitat for diverse species of birds and animals. The project also involves building a pipeline from the site in land-locked Uganda to Tanga in Tanzania. Critics of the project are concerned that, since the proposed pipeline passes through Lake Victoria and close to a number of wildlife areas in Tanzania and Kenya, oil spills could threaten the lake and could have adverse effects on the wildlife, some of which is endangered, in various national parks. In March 2025, a judicial investigation was opened in France for involuntary manslaughter against TotalEnergies in Mozambique. In December 2025, the United Kingdom pulled back US$1.15 billion from TotalEnergies' US$20 billion gas project in Mozambique citing risks of rising jihadism in the region.

=== South Caucasus ===
TotalEnergies' oil and gas investments in the South Caucasus, particularly around the Absheron peninsula, have attracted criticism from journalists, environmental organizations, human rights advocates, and French politicians, who argue that its commercial relationships risk supporting authoritarian governance, facilitating human rights abuses, and undermining climate commitments and French diplomatic priorities.

In June 2024, a French Senate inquiry recommended suspending new French hydrocarbon projects and postponing the second phase of TotalEnergies' Absheron gas development until conditions could ensure that these investments would not contribute, even indirectly, to further regional destabilization in the Caucasus.

=== Human rights abuses by hired task force ===
Over a three-year period between 2020 and 2023, Total helped fund a military task force of up to 1,000 regular troops to protect its gas infrastructure from insurgents during the insurgency in Cabo Delgado. Internal reports revealed that between mid-2020 and late 2022 residents of nearby villages regularly reported human rights violations including torture, detentions and disappearances at the hands of the task force. Despite being aware of these of allegations Total continued funding the task force, opting to selectively punish offenders by withholding a monetary "hardship bonus".

== Automobile and motorcycle OEM partnerships ==
TotalEnergies is an official recommended fuel and lubricants for all prominent Renault–Nissan–Mitsubishi Alliance members, including Renault (shared with BP), Nissan (shared with ExxonMobil), Infiniti, Dacia, Alpine and Datsun, Kia, three Stellantis marques (Citroën, Peugeot and DS), Honda (including Acura, shared with BP and ExxonMobil), Aston Martin, Mazda (shared with BP and its subsidiary Castrol), Sany and Tata Motors (shared with Petronas) for automobiles only as well as Peugeot Motocycles, Kawasaki Motors (fuel only), Energica, and Honda for motorcycles only.

== Sponsorship ==
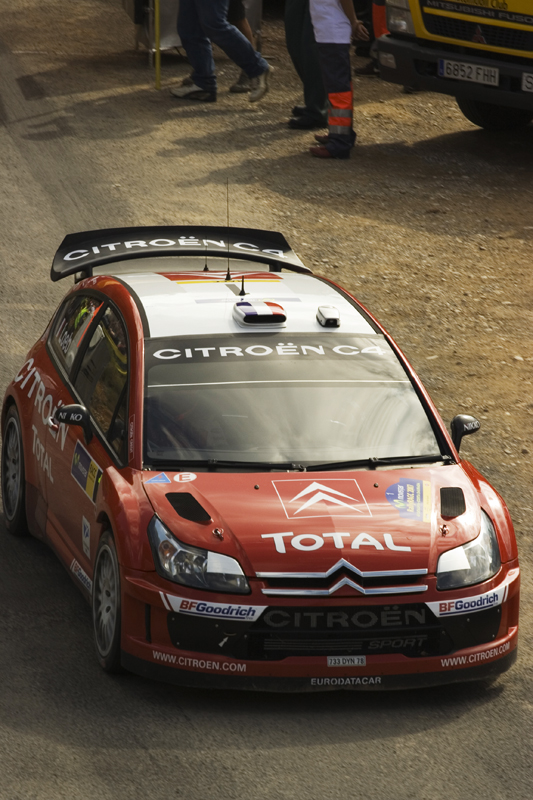
Sébastien Loeb car with total sponsorship

Total has provided fuel and lubricants to professional auto racing teams.

Total has been a longtime partner of Citroën Sport in the World Rally Championship, Dakar Rally and World Touring Car Championship. Sébastien Loeb won nine WRC drivers titles, whereas Ari Vatanen and Pierre Lartigue won four editions of the Dakar Rally.

Total has been a partner of Peugeot Sport in Formula One from 1995 to 2000, the British Touring Car Championship in 1995 and 1996 and since 2001 in the World Rally Championship, Intercontinental Rally Challenge, 24 Hours of Le Mans, Intercontinental Le Mans Cup, Dakar Rally and Pikes Peak International Hill Climb. Total is also a partner of Peugeot Sport for its customer racing TCR Touring Car programme and its Le Mans Hypercar project in the FIA World Endurance Championship.

Total was a partner of Renault Sport in Formula One from 2009 to 2016. Their logo appeared on the Red Bull Racing cars between 2009 and 2016, the Renault F1 cars in 2009, 2010 and 2016, and the Lotus F1 cars from 2011 to 2014. Total also partnered Caterham F1 Team in 2011–2014, Scuderia Toro Rosso in 2014–2015 and Williams F1 Team in 2012–2013.

Also, Total was the title sponsor of the Copa Sudamericana football tournament in 2013 and 2014.

In 2017, Total was appointed by FIA and ACO as official fuel supplier of the World Endurance Championship and 24 Hours of Le Mans from 2018–19 season onwards.

Total is one of the official sponsors from 2013 to 2022 for one of the most popular and influential Mexican football teams, Club America.

In 2016, Total secured an eight-year sponsorship package from the Confederation of African Football (CAF) to support 10 of its principal competitions. Total will start with the Africa Cup of Nations to be held in Gabon, therefore, renaming it Total Africa Cup of Nations.

Following Total's purchase of Direct Énergie in the summer of 2018, the Direct Énergie cycling team changed its name the following year to Total Direct Énergie ahead of that year's edition of Paris–Roubaix. In 2021 the team changed its name again to Team TotalEnergies in time for that year's Tour de France.

In 2019, the company's Chief Executive Officer, Patrick Pouyanne pledged that Total would make a €100 million contribution to the reconstruction of the Notre-Dame cathedral after it was extensively damaged in a fire.

In 2020, the company confirmed a two-year sponsorship deal with CR Flamengo, being the first time a partner of a Brazilian football team.

== See also ==
- 2005 Hertfordshire Oil Storage Terminal fire
- 2007 UK petrol contamination
- Centre Scientifique et Technique Jean Féger, main technical and scientific research center for Total in Pau, France
- ERAP
- Fossil fuels lobby
- Lindsey Oil Refinery
