= Erg (company) =

Italian energy company

Erg S.p.A.

- World Trade Center building in Genoa, where Erg's headquarters are located.
- Native name: Edoardo Raffinerie Garrone
- Type: Public
- Traded as: BIT: ERG; FTSE Italia Mid Cap
- ISIN: IT0001157020
- Industry: Renewable energy
- Founded: June 2, 1938; 88 years ago in Genoa, Italy
- Founder: Edoardo Garrone
- Headquarters: Genoa, Italy
- Key people: Edoardo Garrone (Chairman); Paolo Luigi Merli (CEO)
- Products: Electric power
- Revenue: €752 million (2025)
- Net income: €155 million (2025)
- Total equity: €2,045 million (2025)
- Number of employees: 672 (2025)
- Website: www.erg.eu

Erg S.p.A., acronym for Edoardo Raffinerie Garrone, is an Italian energy company founded in 1938 and based in Genoa, Italy.

It produces wind and solar energy and operates in Italy, France, Germany, the United Kingdom, Poland, Bulgaria, Romania, Spain and the United States. As of 31 December 2025, the group had a total installed capacity of 3,974 MW.

Erg is 62.53% controlled by “SQ Renewables S.p.A.,” a company that is in turn 51% controlled by San Quirico S.p.A. – the holding company of the Garrone‑Mondini family – and the remaining 49% by IFM Investors.

The company has been listed on the Italian stock exchange since 1997.

== History ==
=== Origins ===
Edoardo Guida Garrone founded Erg in 1938 as a company active in the refining of petroleum and tar. The company, which became a refinery after World War II, chose as its trademark a die (from “Dado,” an affectionate diminutive of Edoardo) whose faces bore a three-letter acronym, the initials of Edoardo Raffinerie Garrone, or Erg.

=== Postwar period ===
In 1947, production began at the Genoa San Quirico Refinery. Immediately after World War II, in a country in need of reconstruction, energy needs made oil a key energy source. Thanks to the favorable economic situation and the optimal geographical location of the plants, Erg's business experienced rapid development.

In 1956, Erg signed an agreement to refine oil on behalf of BP, which subsequently held a minority interest in Erg's share capital for several years.

In 1963, the refinery reached 6.5 million tonnes of processed material. During the 1960s and 1970s the company started to build some oil refineries and pipelines in Italy. Specifically, in 1967 Erg built a major pipeline in Arquata Scrivia; in 1971, it entered with other private groups into the shareholding structure of ISAB (Industria Siciliana Asfalti e Bitumi), a company created to build a large refinery in Sicily that began production in 1975 in Priolo Gargallo.

=== Erg network development ===
After developing business mainly in the refining sector, the Genoa-based company also began to grow nationally in the fuel distribution sector through its subsidiary Erg Petroli. In 1984, it acquired the network of 780 petrol stations operated by Elf's Italian subsidiary and, in 1986, 1,700 stations owned by Chevron. The Erg network subsequently expanded and adopted the brand characterized by the three rampant panthers.

In 1987 the company also finalized an agreement with BP to distribute the British company's lubricants.

Collaboration with Elf and BP to sell lubricants (produced by Erg's own plants in Savona) continued until 1996, when its own product was launched. In 1985, in anticipation of the closure of the San Quirico Refinery in Genoa, it took control of ISAB with a stake that grew over the years until it reached 100 percent in 1997. In 1994, ISAB Energy was established to build a plant to produce electricity derived from the gasification of heavy oils. By the mid-1990s, Erg accounted for 6 percent of the Italian market in the field of service stations.

The company has been listed on the Italian Stock Exchange since 1997. In 1999, it opened a petrol station network in Spain through Erg Petroleos, which was sold in 2008 to Saras S.p.A.

=== From oil to multi-energy company ===
In 2000, Erg began producing electricity through ISAB Energy (a joint venture with Edison Mission Energy), with a capacity of 528 MW and an estimated production of about 4 billion kWh per year; the goal was to build Italy's first heavy oil regasification plant for electricity production. With this operation, Erg, from an oil company, becomes a “multi-energy” company.

A few years later, in October 2002, Erg Raffinerie Mediterranee was founded, a company entrusted with the management of one of the refining hubs in Europe, achieved through the union and integration of Erg's ISAB Refinery with the former Agip refinery, both in Priolo. The integration of the two refineries took place through the construction of an oil pipeline system and other upgrades and improvements to production efficiency and environmental compatibility.

In 2005, Erg's stock joined the Blue-Chip segment of the Italian Stock Exchange, following the stock's significant increase in market capitalization.

In 2006, Erg acquired EnerTAD, a company listed on the Milan Stock Exchange that built and operated wind farms. The transaction marks Erg's entry into the renewables sector, again as part of the “multi-energy” strategy. Later, EnerTAD changed its corporate name to Erg Renew. Following the EnerTAD acquisition, from 2007 Erg started to operate in the French and German wind markets, and also acquired wind farms in Bulgaria, Romania, Poland and the United Kingdom.

In 2008, it signed an agreement with Lukoil, under which Lukoil acquired a 49% stake in the Priolo Gargallo refining activities.

=== Growth of renewables and divestment of oil business ===
From 2008, Erg started a profound transformation process that led it to divest from the oil sector in order to focus investments on renewables. In 2010, Total Italia and Erg Petroli merged to create TotalErg, a joint venture between Total (49%) and Erg (51%).

Then, in early 2011 Erg reduced its share in ISAB from 51% to 40%. Two years later Erg completed the exit from the refining sector.

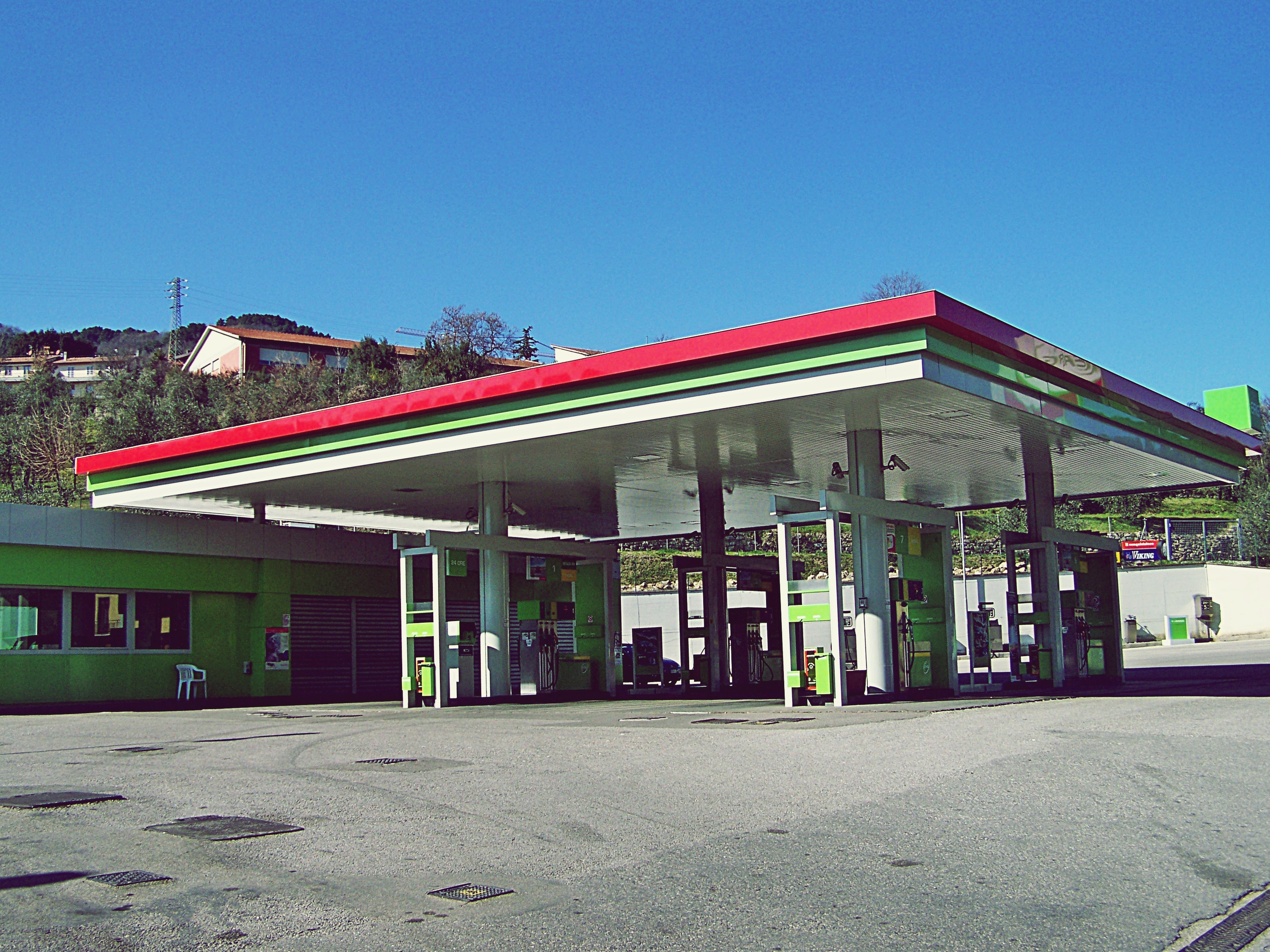
Erg service station in 2011

In the meantime (since 2010) Erg grew in the Italian wind power sector becoming the leading wind operator in Italy in 2013. In seven years, between 2008 and 2014, the company divested assets worth €3.3 billion and reinvested €3.9 billion on renewables related activities.

Meanwhile, in 2009 it launched its own Mobile Virtual Network Operator: Erg Mobile, becoming the first Italian oil company with its own telecommunications company.

In 2015 Erg entered the hydroelectric sector, via acquisition of E.ON's Italian assets, with 527 MW of capacity.

In February 2016 Erg entered the UK wind market acquiring a wind farm project in Northern Ireland (45 MW) and completed the acquisition of eleven wind farms in France and six in Germany (206 MW).

In January 2018, Total and Erg completed the closing with Gruppo API regarding the sale of TotalErg, and Erg completed its industrial transformation process towards renewables. In the same year, Erg entered the solar power business through the acquisition of 89 MW (30 photovoltaic plants) in Italy.

=== Transition to a pure renewable model and entry into the US market ===
Starting in 2021, Erg completed its transformation into an exclusively renewable operator, focusing on wind and solar power generation, with the divestment of its hydro and thermoelectric assets.

Specifically, in August 2021 the company signed an agreement with Enel Produzione to sell the entire capital of Erg Hydro S.r.L., while in June 2023 it signed an agreement with Achernar Assets to sell Erg Power S.r.l., owner of the Priolo Gargallo natural gas-fired power plant.

In June 2022, San Quirico, the holding company that has control over Erg, and IFM Investors signed a long-term strategic partnership. Under the agreement, the new holding company SQ Renewables Spa was established. IFM and its affiliates acquired an initial 35 percent stake in the new holding company, which in turn holds about 62.5 percent of Erg. This was the first direct investment in Italy for IFM. In April 2024, as per the agreement, IFM increased its stake in SQ Renewables to 49%.

Since 2023, as part of its wind asset portfolio renewal project, the group completed the repowering of four wind farms in Sicily, doubling installed capacity and about tripling power generation.

In the same year, in December, Erg entered the renewables market in the United States through an agreement with Apex Clean Energy Holdings. This includes the acquisition of a wind plant and a solar plant for 317 MW of installed capacity and an estimated production of about 1 TWh. There is also a cooperation agreement related to about 1 GW of new onshore solar and wind projects under development in the United States.

=== Erg Mobile ===
Erg Mobile was an Italian mobile virtual network operator launched by Erg in 2009 under a commercial agreement with Vodafone.

The service was distributed through the Erg and later TotalErg service-station network. Following the sale of TotalErg's fuel business to Gruppo API, Erg Mobile ceased operations on 30 March 2019.

== Profile ==
As of 31 December 2025, Erg is an international operator in the renewable energy sector.

The group generates electricity from renewable sources, primarily through wind and solar power plants, and is also active in battery energy storage. Following its gradual industrial transformation and exit from oil-related activities, Erg is the leading wind power operator in Italy and is among the top ten onshore wind operators in Europe.

In Italy, the company operates with a total installed capacity of 1,661 MW, including 1,468 MW in wind, 180 MW in solar and 13 MW in energy storage.

Internationally, Erg has a total installed capacity of 2,313 MW. In wind power, the group operates in France, Germany, the United Kingdom, Poland, Romania, Bulgaria and the United States, while in solar power generation it is active in France, Spain and the United States.

=== Sustainability ===
In October 2022, Standard Ethics Aei upgraded Erg's sustainability rating to "E+" with a positive outlook within the SE European Utilities Index.

== Sponsorship ==
Erg was the main sponsor of U.C. Sampdoria (until 2011), a football club that was owned by the Garrone family (Riccardo Garrone was the chairman, with Edoardo as the vice-chairman, and Vittorio as director), for more than 9 years.
