= Gozzano =

Gozzano may refer to:

- Gozzano, Piedmont, a municipality in Piedmont, northern Italy
- Guido Gozzano (1883-1916), an Italian poet and writer
