= 2022 European Motocross Championship =

The 2022 European Motocross Championship was the 34th European Motocross Championship season since it was revived in 1988. It included 16 events and 6 different classes. It started in Great Britain on 20 February and ended in Turkey on 4 September. All rounds acted as support classes at the European rounds of the 2022 MXGP.

== EMX250 ==
A 10-round calendar for the 2022 season was announced on 17 November 2021. EMX250 is for riders competing on 2-stroke and 4-stroke motorcycles between 175cc-250cc. Only riders under the age of 23 are allowed to compete.

=== Calendar ===
Round	Date	Grand Prix	Location	Race 1 Winner	Race 2 Winner	Round Winner	Report
1	6 March	(Lombardy) Lombardia	Mantova	(Netherlands) Rick Elzinga	(Norway) Cornelius Tøndel	(Netherlands) Rick Elzinga	
2	3 April	Portugal	Agueda	(Netherlands) Rick Elzinga	(Netherlands) Rick Elzinga	(Netherlands) Rick Elzinga	
3	8 May	Italy	Maggiora	(Norway) Cornelius Tøndel	(Norway) Håkon Østerhagen	(Norway) Cornelius Tøndel	
4	15 May	Sardinia	Riola Sardo	(Netherlands) Rick Elzinga	(Italy) Andrea Bonacorsi	(Italy) Andrea Bonacorsi	
5	5 June	France	Ernée	(Spain) Yago Martinez	(Norway) Cornelius Tøndel	(Netherlands) Rick Elzinga	
6	12 June	Germany	Teutschenthal	(Italy) Andrea Bonacorsi	(Netherlands) Rick Elzinga	(Netherlands) Rick Elzinga	
7	24 July	Flanders	Lommel	(Belgium) Lucas Coenen	(Belgium) Lucas Coenen	(Belgium) Lucas Coenen	
8	7 August	Sweden	Uddevalla	(Norway) Håkon Østerhagen	(Belgium) Lucas Coenen	(Norway) Håkon Østerhagen	
9	14 August	Finland	Hyvinkää	(Belgium) Lucas Coenen	(Belgium) Lucas Coenen	(Belgium) Lucas Coenen	
10	21 August	Charente-Maritime	St Jean d'Angely	(Belgium) Lucas Coenen	(Belgium) Lucas Coenen	(Belgium) Lucas Coenen	

=== Entry list ===
Team	Constructor	No	Rider	Rounds
SM Action Racing Team Yuasa Battery	Gas Gas	3	(Italy) Federico Tuani	All
SM Action Racing Team Yuasa Battery	Gas Gas	669	(Italy) Luca Ruffini	All
Jezyk Racing Team	KTM	4	(Spain) Gerard Congost	1, 3, 5–6, 10
Schmicker Racing	KTM	7	(Germany) Maximilian Spies	All
Schmicker Racing	KTM	568	(Sweden) Max Pålsson	1–2, 5–6
Ausio Racing Team	Yamaha	8	(Spain) Eric Tomás	2–3, 5–7
Ausio Racing Team	Yamaha	96	(Spain) Víctor Alonso	10
WZ Racing Team	KTM	10	(Spain) Oriol Oliver	1–2, 7
WZ Racing Team	KTM	131	(Germany) Cato Nickel	6–9
WZ Racing Team	KTM	401	(Austria) Marcel Stauffer	3
WZ Racing Team	KTM	572	(Denmark) Rasmus Pedersen	7
WZ Racing Team	KTM	696	(Switzerland) Mike Gwerder	1–6, 8–10
Chambers Racing	Gas Gas	16	(United Kingdom) Tom Grimshaw	5–7, 10
Bloody Harry Energy - RGS MX Team	Husqvarna	17	(Belgium) Junior Bal	7
Jumbo Husqvarna BT Racing Team	Husqvarna	19	(Belgium) Sacha Coenen	1–3, 5–9
Jumbo Husqvarna BT Racing Team	Husqvarna	93	(Belgium) Lucas Coenen	All
Nestaan Husqvarna Factory Racing	Husqvarna	20	(France) Maxime Grau	6–8, 10
KTM Motofavorīts MX Team	KTM	21	(Latvia) Rauls Blūmfelds	1
Maggiora Park Racing Team	KTM	23	(Italy) Tommaso Sarasso	3
Maggiora Park Racing Team	KTM	50	(Italy) Paolo Lugana	1–4
Maggiora Park Racing Team	KTM	270	(Italy) Eugenio Barbaglia	1, 3–4
Team VRT KTM Veritise	KTM	24	(Spain) David Braceras	1–6, 8–10
KTM Kosak Team	KTM	25	(Germany) Paul Bloy	6
KTM Kosak Team	KTM	70	(Germany) Valentin Kees	6
KTM Kosak Team	KTM	532	(Germany) Constantin Piller	1, 6, 10
KTM SB Racing	KTM	26	(South Africa) Miguel de Waal	1–3
KTM SB Racing	KTM	27	(United Kingdom) Christopher Mills	1
KTM SB Racing	KTM	67	(Spain) Yago Martinez	2–8, 10
Oragno114 Husqvarna Racing	Husqvarna	28	(Italy) Andrea Viano	1, 3
	Yamaha	29	(Norway) Sander Agard-Michelsen	1, 7–9
Emme Motori Tecnosport	KTM	31	(Italy) Francesco Bassi	3, 10
	KTM	32	(Netherlands) Marcel Conijn	1, 3–8, 10
AMX Racing Team	KTM	34	(France) Bogdan Krajewski	2
GT Racing	KTM	34	(France) Bogdan Krajewski	10
Hutten Metaal Yamaha Racing	Yamaha	35	(Italy) Andrea Bonacorsi	All
Hutten Metaal Yamaha Racing	Yamaha	44	(Netherlands) Rick Elzinga	All
Hutten Metaal Yamaha Racing	Yamaha	484	(Netherlands) Dave Kooiker	All
Riley Racing	Yamaha	38	(Denmark) William Voxen Kleemann	1–4
Riley Racing	Yamaha	912	(United Kingdom) Joel Rizzi	1
KTM Eesti	KTM	40	(Estonia) Martin Michelis	1
FCR Motorsport	KTM	41	(Finland) Kasper Kangasniemi	9
FCR Motorsport	Husqvarna	733	(Estonia) Kaarel Tilk	9
	Honda	42	(Finland) Sampo Rainio	1, 9
Diana MX Team	Husqvarna	45	(Italy) Pietro Razzini	4–7, 10
Diana MX Team	Husqvarna	56	(Italy) Lorenzo Corti	5
Diana MX Team	Husqvarna	191	(Italy) Davide Della Valle	7
Ceres 71 Racing	Yamaha	49	(Italy) Mattia Dusi	1–2, 4
Holeshot2Roo	Husqvarna	51	(France) Jules Delaporte	5
Marin & Fritid Husqvarna Scandinavia	Husqvarna	52	(Sweden) Albin Gerhardsson	1
MRT Racing Team KTM	KTM	53	(Italy) Valerio Lata	1–2, 7, 10
KRTZ Motorsport	Gas Gas	55	(Czech Republic) Adam Dušek	6
KRTZ Motorsport	Gas Gas	311	(Czech Republic) Marek Nešpor	6
EB57	Husqvarna	57	(Latvia) Edvards Bidzāns	9
SHR Motorsports	Yamaha	60	(Latvia) Mairis Pumpurs	1
FM Max Bart Racing	KTM	64	(Italy) Lorenzo Ciabatti	All
FM Max Bart Racing	KTM	249	(Italy) Dario Calugi	3–4, 10
Ghidinelli Fantic Racing Team	Fantic	67	(Spain) Yago Martínez	1
Ghidinelli Fantic Racing Team	Fantic	252	(Spain) Raúl Sánchez	1
M.B.T. Racing Team	Husqvarna	71	(Italy) Morgan Bennati	1, 10
HMX Van Der Vegt Kawasaki	Kawasaki	75	(Netherlands) Bradley Mesters	7
Buitenhuis Racing	Yamaha	77	(Netherlands) Kevin Buitenhuis	7
Sturm STC Racing Team	Yamaha	90	(Germany) Justin Trache	3, 6–9
Sturm STC Racing Team	KTM	401	(Austria) Marcel Stauffer	1–2
MB Motocross Team	Yamaha	97	(Norway) Råg Rindal	8
Team VHR KTM Racing	KTM	100	(France) Scotty Verhaeghe	5–10
Team VHR KTM Racing	KTM	207	(France) Xavier Cazal	5–10
Team VHR KTM Racing	KTM	744	(France) Saad Soulimani	1, 7–10
RF105	Gas Gas	105	(Portugal) Rúben Ferreira	2
	KTM	113	(Italy) Nicolò Turaglio	2–3
Vema Beton	Gas Gas	114	(Belgium) Nicolas Vennekens	7
MCR Racing Team	Husqvarna	117	(Italy) Giacomo Bosi	1
TBS Conversions Racing Team	KTM	122	(South Africa) Camden McLellan	All
Team Yamaha Blue Motor Alves Bandeira	Yamaha	141	(Portugal) Afonso Gomes	2
KRT Kawasaki	Kawasaki	143	(Finland) Wiljam Malin	9
KMP Honda Racing	Honda	145	(Germany) Pascal Jungmann	1, 6
KMP Honda Racing	Honda	543	(Germany) Nick Domann	6
KMP Honda Racing	Honda	839	(Denmark) Victor Voxen Kleemann	1, 3–4, 7–8
	Husqvarna	148	(Netherlands) Robert Fobbe	7–8, 10
Team Fly Over Racing	Kawasaki	153	(Italy) Riccardo Bindi	1, 3
	Honda	155	(Germany) Tom Schröder	1, 6
	Husqvarna	171	(Germany) Fynn-Niklas Tornau	1, 8
Fantic Factory Team Maddii	Fantic	172	(Netherlands) Cas Valk	4
Fantic Factory Team Maddii	Fantic	302	(Norway) Cornelius Tøndel	All
Fantic Factory Team Maddii	Fantic	312	(Norway) Håkon Østerhagen	All
	Husqvarna	180	(Sweden) Leopold Ambjörnsson	1
MBP Motocross Team	KTM	181	(Lithuania) Erlandas Mackonis	9
GRT Impact KTM	KTM	184	(United Kingdom) James Carpenter	5
HTS KTM	KTM	214	(Hungary) Bence Pergel	1
3MM Energy Drink BUD Racing Kawasaki	Kawasaki	217	(United Kingdom) Eddie Jay Wade	All
3MM Energy Drink BUD Racing Kawasaki	Kawasaki	319	(France) Quentin-Marc Prugnières	All
Team Giorgio	Gas Gas	220	(France) Toni Giorgessi	10
Steels Dr Jack TM Racing	TM	228	(Italy) Emilio Scuteri	1, 5–6
MXFontaRacing Gas Gas Syneco	Gas Gas	235	(Italy) Mirko Valsecchi	1
	KTM	237	(Switzerland) Xylian Ramella	5
Spartum Factory	KTM	241	(France) Nicolas Duhamel	10
	Yamaha	247	(Belgium) Sam Jordant	7
F4E Gas Gas Racing Team	Gas Gas	252	(Spain) Raúl Sánchez	5–9
F4E Gas Gas Racing Team	Gas Gas	309	(Spain) Guillem Farrés	2
Wozniak Racing	Yamaha	256	(Denmark) Magnus Smith	6, 8
Sahkar Racing	KTM	261	(Estonia) Jörgen-Matthias Talviku	1–2, 4–6
Edal Carpintaria Momento TT	KTM	285	(Portugal) Alex Almeida	2
Team Momento TT Motos	Gas Gas	291	(Portugal) Fábio Costa	2
Raths Motorsports	KTM	309	(Spain) Guillem Farrés	7
Raths Motorsports	KTM	440	(Germany) Marnique Appelt	1
Raths Motorsports	KTM	817	(Netherlands) Raf Meuwissen	1–2
Motorace Yamaha Speedcity	Yamaha	315	(Portugal) Rúben Ribeiro	2
RFX Whites Transport KTM	KTM	338	(United Kingdom) Benjamin White	2
JWR Honda Racing	Gas Gas	351	(Sweden) Jeff Oxelmark	8–9
Absolut MX	Kawasaki	354	(Sweden) Viking Lindstrom	8
	KTM	358	(Norway) Odin Ramseng Haseth	8
Nilsson Training Motos Arribas	Husqvarna	368	(Spain) Samuel Nilsson	7–10
	Husqvarna	402	(Finland) Mauno Nieminen	9
Husqvarna SKS Racing NL	Husqvarna	408	(Netherlands) Scott Smulders	1–2, 7, 10
Brouwer Jumbo Gas Gas	Gas Gas	411	(Netherlands) Kjeld Stuurman	1, 4, 7
	KTM	417	(Belgium) Hugo Buchelot	10
Millionaire Racing Team	Husqvarna	420	(Italy) Andrea Rossi	1–7, 10
Stielergruppe.mx Johannes-Bikes Suzuki	Suzuki	427	(Germany) Niklas Schneider	6
Q Racing Team	Husqvarna	437	(Czech Republic) Martin Venhoda	1
je68 KTM Scandinavia	KTM	451	(Sweden) Alfons Stensson	8
Next Level Professional Motocross Team	Yamaha	456	(Norway) Mathias Kjørstad	6–8
KTM Scandinavia/CEC Racing	KTM	464	(Sweden) Ramus Håkansson	8–9
KTM Sarholz Racing Team	KTM	470	(Germany) Peter König	1, 6
SixtySeven Racing Team	KTM	473	(Germany) Collin Wohnhas	6
Motor2000 Powered by Young Motion	KTM	489	(Netherlands) Jens Walvoort	1–2, 7–10
FRT Motorsport	Husqvarna	499	(Italy) Emanuele Alberio	1–2
FF Racing Team	Gas Gas	505	(Sweden) Arvid Lüning	1, 4–9
FF Racing Team	Gas Gas	716	(Sweden) Martin Holm	8–9
	Yamaha	510	(Peru) Bruno Alvarez	10
Mellendijk Moto Parts Gas Gas	Gas Gas	521	(Netherlands) Boris Blanken	1, 3, 5–6
RX Moto Oy	Husqvarna	524	(Finland) Miro Varjonen	9
Karlstroms Motor Husqvarna Scandinavia	Husqvarna	555	(Sweden) Noel Nilsson	7–9
DAM Racing	KTM	563	(Belgium) Wesly Dieudonné	1–2, 4–7
Gas Gas Scandinavia	Gas Gas	590	(Denmark) Jayden Schmidt	7
	Husqvarna	599	(Sweden) Noah Englund	9
Motor2000 KTM Racing Team	KTM	601	(United Kingdom) Kelton Gwyther	1–5, 7–10
Team LB Racing	KTM	606	(France) Killian Vincent	5
KTM Dach/Motoshop Zachmann	KTM	626	(Switzerland) Joel Elsener	1–2
KTM Racing Estonia Powered by Young Motion	KTM	651	(Estonia) Meico Vettik	1–4, 7–9
	Husqvarna	671	(Belgium) Brent Aerden	7
Dream Team Husqvarna	Husqvarna	684	(Latvia) Uldis Freibergs	9
	KTM	715	(Netherlands) Jaap Janssen	7
HT Group Racing Team	Husqvarna	717	(Czech Republic) Jan Wagenknecht	5–6
Forsell Motor Racing Team	Husqvarna	727	(Sweden) Marcus Gredinger	8
Pro Factory Racing Team	Gas Gas	798	(France) Arnaud Colson	10
Mascot Motor MC	Yamaha	921	(Sweden) Jesper Gangfors	8
KTM Scandinavia	KTM	959	(Denmark) Mike Lauritsen	1
Made Of Gas Gas	Gas Gas	974	(Italy) Mario Tamai	3
Indeka	KTM	991	(Poland) Szymon Staszkiewicz	1

=== Riders Championship ===
Pos	Rider	Bike	LOM		POR (Portugal)		ITA (Italy)		SAR (Sardinia)		FRA (France)		GER (Germany)		FLA (Flanders)		SWE (Sweden)		FIN (Finland)		CHA		Points
1	(Netherlands) Rick Elzinga	Yamaha	1	4	1	1	7	Ret	1	3	2	3	2	1	3	3	9	4	4	7	8	12	365
2	(Belgium) Lucas Coenen	Husqvarna	Ret	22	3	3	2	15	4	2	Ret	2	9	5	1	1	Ret	1	1	1	1	1	333
3	(Norway) Cornelius Tøndel	Fantic	7	1	5	2	1	2	7	4	9	1	7	7	6	6	Ret	5	5	3	22	7	317
4	(South Africa) Camden McLellan	KTM	6	8	2	14	14	5	13	9	11	7	6	3	7	5	3	6	2	4	6	3	299
5	(France) Quentin-Marc Prugnières	Kawasaki	8	11	20	8	12	17	5	6	4	6	4	8	4	Ret	2	3	26	6	3	4	258
6	(Italy) Andrea Bonacorsi	Yamaha	Ret	6	18	11	8	3	2	1	5	15	1	10	2	4	Ret	20	6	2	17	Ret	248
7	(Norway) Håkon Østerhagen	Fantic	4	3	17	16	3	1	10	12	35	4	12	9	Ret	14	1	2	3	5	16	DNS	246
8	(Spain) David Braceras	KTM	2	23	9	12	5	4	22	13	6	8	5	4			5	17	16	9	5	8	213
9	(Germany) Maximilian Spies	KTM	21	25	8	9	11	12	11	11	14	5	14	15	9	7	7	15	14	8	11	9	188
10	(Spain) Yago Martínez	Fantic	27	32																			145
10	(Spain) Yago Martínez	KTM			11	13	4	7	17	24	1	10	28	Ret	Ret	20	4	7			2	Ret	145
11	(Estonia) Meico Vettik	KTM	10	2	10	5	Ret	13	Ret	Ret					13	8	15	8	10	10			130
12	(Netherlands) Dave Kooiker	Yamaha	18	12	31	19	16	19	3	7	16	26	15	11	8	32	13	14	8	Ret	15	25	123
13	(Estonia) Jörgen-Matthias Talviku	KTM	3	10	12	10			6	10	3	DNS	8	18									113
14	(United Kingdom) Eddie Wade	Kawasaki	12	Ret	16	20	13	6	21	19	17	13	13	6	11	11	DNQ	DNQ	7	18	DNS	DNS	112
15	(France) Scotty Verhaeghe	KTM									12	11	11	13	16	13	11	10	9	12	9	14	111
16	(Switzerland) Mike Gwerder	KTM	9	7	29	DNS	6	22	9	8	10	12	10	16			DNQ	DNQ	27	13	DNQ	DNQ	110
17	(France) Maxime Grau	Husqvarna											3	2	34	22	Ret	DNS			4	2	82
18	(Spain) Oriol Oliver	KTM	5	5	6	6									10	23							73
19	(Belgium) Sacha Coenen	Husqvarna	19	31	22	22	Ret	DNS			7	9	Ret	Ret	5	Ret	6	11	DNS	DNS			69
20	(Spain) Gerard Congost	KTM	15	19			Ret	11			8	23	21	12							7	6	69
21	(Austria) Marcel Stauffer	KTM	Ret	13	4	4	10	16															60
22	(Italy) Paolo Lugana	KTM	14	14	15	15	15	9	12	18													56
23	(Italy) Federico Tuani	Gas Gas	Ret	33	23	25	17	8	15	16	22	Ret	32	20	15	10	35	16	Ret	DNS	27	22	51
24	(Spain) Guillem Farrés	Gas Gas			7	7																	50
24	(Spain) Guillem Farrés	KTM													Ret	2							50
25	(Italy) Lorenzo Ciabatti	KTM	16	24	19	21	9	10	19	17	23	14	17	19	DNQ	DNQ	31	29	34	24	20	Ret	50
26	(Denmark) Magnus Smith	Yamaha											19	14			8	9					34
27	(Norway) Sander Agard-Michelsen	Yamaha	20	17											20	9	21	26	12	17			31
28	(Italy) Valerio Lata	KTM	Ret	18	21	26									26	25					10	5	30
29	(Belgium) Wesly Dieudonné	KTM	31	16	26	27			16	15	26	Ret	16	21	12	Ret							30
30	(Sweden) Arvid Lüning	Gas Gas	DNQ	30					14	21	28	31	Ret	24	27	26	14	18	15	14			30
31	(Italy) Andrea Rossi	Husqvarna	28	15	27	18	22	14	18	22	18	18	24	27	28	16					Ret	Ret	30
32	(Netherlands) Cas Valk	Fantic							8	5													29
33	(Netherlands) Raf Meuwissen	KTM	13	9	13	Ret																	28
34	(Germany) Cato Nickel	KTM											23	25	14	19	10	13	DNS	DNS			28
35	(Sweden) Rasmus Håkansson	KTM															12	12	11	Ret			28
36	(Netherlands) Marcel Conijn	KTM	DNQ	DNQ			27	18	Ret	14	34	29	33	33	19	12	25	21			31	16	26
37	(Spain) Samuel Nilsson	Husqvarna													DNQ	DNQ	17	19	21	Ret	13	10	25
38	(Sweden) Max Pålsson	KTM	24	29	14	17					15	17	26	22									21
39	(United Kingdom) Tom Grimshaw	Gas Gas									19	20	22	23	25	24					12	13	20
40	(Netherlands) Jens Walvoort	KTM	32	20	25	30									18	17	26	24	28	11	26	21	18
41	(Spain) Víctor Alonso	Yamaha																			18	11	13
42	(Italy) Emilio Scuteri	TM	29	Ret							13	16	Ret	26									13
43	(United Kingdom) Joel Rizzi	Yamaha	11	Ret																			10
44	(France) Saad Soulimani	KTM	23	Ret											DNQ	DNQ	30	27	13	20	28	24	9
45	(Italy) Francesco Bassi	KTM					18	Ret													Ret	15	9
46	(Latvia) Edvards Bidzāns	Husqvarna																	18	15			9
47	(France) Bogdan Krajewski	KTM			30	31															14	20	8
48	(Sweden) Jeff Oxelmark	Gas Gas															16	28	20	19			8
49	(Finland) Sampo Rainio	Honda	30	DNS															19	16			7
50	(Czech Republic) Jan Wagenknecht	Husqvarna									21	22	18	17									7
51	(Sweden) Noel Nilsson	Husqvarna													22	15	28	25	31	31			6
52	(Italy) Pietro Razzini	Husqvarna							20	23	24	19	36	35	21	Ret					30	19	5
53	(Netherlands) Scott Smulders	Husqvarna	DNQ	DNQ	34	28									17	27					29	23	4
54	(Germany) Constantin Piller	KTM	34	Ret									DNQ	DNQ							23	17	4
55	(Latvia) Mairis Pumpurs	Yamaha	17	28																			4
56	(Finland) Mauno Nieminen	Husqvarna																	17	Ret			4
57	(Italy) Luca Ruffini	Gas Gas	DNQ	DNQ	Ret	Ret	28	28	DNS	DNS	27	28	20	31	DNQ	DNQ	22	31	35	Ret	24	18	4
58	(Netherlands) Kjeld Stuurman	Gas Gas	DNQ	DNQ					23	25					31	18							3
59	(Sweden) Marcus Gredinger	Husqvarna															18	Ret					3
60	(Italy) Mario Tamai	Gas Gas					19	25															2
61	(Italy) Morgan Bennati	Husqvarna	DNQ	DNQ																	19	29	2
62	(Sweden) Viking Lindström	Kawasaki															19	DNS					2
63	(Italy) Eugenio Barbaglia	KTM	DNQ	DNQ			21	23	24	20													1
64	(United Kingdom) James Carpenter	KTM									20	21											1
65	(Italy) Andrea Viano	Husqvarna	DNQ	DNQ			20	24															1
66	(Italy) Tommaso Sarasso	KTM					25	20															1
67	(Germany) Justin Trache	Yamaha					30	Ret					DNQ	DNQ	DNQ	DNQ	20	33	Ret	30			1
	(Sweden) Albin Gerhardsson	Husqvarna	22	21																			0
	(Latvia) Uldis Freibergs	Husqvarna																	23	21			0
	(Denmark) William Voxen Kleemann	Yamaha	DNQ	DNQ	28	24	26	21	DNS	DNS													0
	(Netherlands) Bradley Mesters	Kawasaki													24	21							0
	(France) Toni Giorgessi	Gas Gas																			21	26	0
	(Spain) Raúl Sánchez	Fantic	DNQ	DNQ																			0
	(Spain) Raúl Sánchez	Gas Gas									30	27	29	Ret	37	Ret	23	23	22	Ret			0
	(Sweden) Alfons Stensson	KTM															24	22					0
	(Estonia) Kaarel Tilk	Husqvarna																	30	22			0
	(France) Xavier Cazal	KTM									25	30	35	32	32	29	32	32	24	23	25	30	0
	(Portugal) Fábio Costa	Gas Gas			24	23																	0
	(Denmark) Victor Voxen Kleemann	Honda	DNQ	DNQ			23	30	25	Ret					36	31	Ret	DNS					0
	(Netherlands) Robert Fobbe	Husqvarna													23	Ret	27	35			Ret	Ret	0
	(Italy) Dario Calugi	KTM					24	29	27	Ret											32	31	0
	(Netherlands) Boris Blanken	Gas Gas	DNQ	DNQ			32	27			33	24	34	34									0
	(Spain) Eric Tomás	Yamaha			Ret	29	31	26			29	25	31	30	33	28							0
	(Italy) Emanuele Alberio	Husqvarna	25	26	DNS	DNS																	0
	(Czech Republic) Adam Dušek	Gas Gas											25	28									0
	(Sweden) Martin Holm	Gas Gas															34	34	32	25			0
	(Sweden) Noah Englund	KTM																	25	32			0
	(Italy) Mattia Dusi	Yamaha	DNQ	DNQ	Ret	32			26	26													0
	(Germany) Marnique Appelt	KTM	26	27																			0
	(Finland) Wiljam Malin	Kawasaki																	33	26			0
	(United Kingdom) Kelton Gwyther	KTM	DNQ	DNQ	35	36	33	32	28	27	36	33			DNQ	DNQ	DNQ	DNQ	36	Ret	34	32	0
	(Finland) Miro Varjonen	Husqvarna																	29	27			0
	(Germany) Valentin Kees	KTM											27	Ret									0
	(France) Arnaud Colson	Gas Gas																			Ret	27	0
	(Lithuania) Erlandas Mackonis	KTM																	Ret	28			0
	(France) Nicolas Duhamel	KTM																			Ret	28	0
	(Germany) Paul Bloy	KTM											30	29									0
	(Belgium) Brent Aerden	Husqvarna													29	30							0
	(Italy) Nicolò Turaglio	KTM			33	33	29	Ret															0
	(Sweden) Jesper Gangfors	Yamaha															29	Ret					0
	(Finland) Kasper Kangasniemi	KTM																	Ret	29			0
	(Norway) Mathias Kjørstad	Yamaha											DNQ	DNQ	30	33	DNQ	30					0
	(Italy) Lorenzo Corti	Husqvarna									31	32											0
	(Italy) Riccardo Bindi	Kawasaki	DNQ	DNQ			Ret	31															0
	(Portugal) Afonso Gomes	Yamaha			32	34																	0
	(France) Killian Vincent	KTM									32	DSQ											0
	(Belgium) Hugo Buchelot	KTM																			33	33	0
	(Hungary) Bence Pergel	KTM	33	34																			0
	(Germany) Fynn-Niklas Tornau	Husqvarna	DNQ	DNQ													33	Ret					0
	(South Africa) Miguel de Waal	KTM	DNQ	DNQ	Ret	35	DNS	DNS															0
	(Netherlands) Jaap Janssen	KTM													35	Ret							0
	(Italy) Mirko Valsecchi	Gas Gas	35	DNS																			0
	(France) Jules Delaporte	Husqvarna									37	Ret											0
	(Switzerland) Joel Elsener	KTM	DNQ	DNQ	Ret	Ret																	0
	(Germany) Tom Schröder	Honda	DNQ	DNQ									Ret	Ret									0
	(Switzerland) Xylian Ramella	KTM									DNS	DNS											0
	(Denmark) Rasmus Pedersen	KTM													DNS	DNS							0
	(Germany) Peter König	KTM	DNQ	DNQ									DNQ	DNQ									0
	(Germany) Pascal Jungmann	Honda	DNQ	DNQ									DNQ	DNQ									0
	(Italy) Giacomo Bosi	Husqvarna	DNQ	DNQ																			0
	(Denmark) Mike Lauritsen	KTM	DNQ	DNQ																			0
	(Estonia) Martin Michelis	KTM	DNQ	DNQ																			0
	(Czech Republic) Martin Venhoda	Husqvarna	DNQ	DNQ																			0
	(Sweden) Leopold Ambjörnsson	Husqvarna	DNQ	DNQ																			0
	(Poland) Szymon Staszkiewicz	KTM	DNQ	DNQ																			0
	(Latvia) Rauls Blūmfelds	KTM	DNQ	DNQ																			0
	(United Kingdom) Christopher Mills	KTM	DNQ	DNQ																			0
	(Portugal) Alex Almeida	KTM			DNQ	DNQ																	0
	(Portugal) Rúben Ribeiro	Yamaha			DNQ	DNQ																	0
	(United Kingdom) Benjamin White	KTM			DNQ	DNQ																	0
	(Portugal) Rúben Ferreira	Gas Gas			DNQ	DNQ																	0
	(Germany) Nick Domann	Honda											DNQ	DNQ									0
	(Germany) Collin Wohnhas	Husqvarna											DNQ	DNQ									0
	(Czech Republic) Marek Nešpor	KTM											DNQ	DNQ									0
	(Germany) Niklas Schneider	Suzuki											DNQ	DNQ									0
	(Belgium) Junior Bal	Husqvarna													DNQ	DNQ							0
	(Italy) Davide Della Valle	Husqvarna													DNQ	DNQ							0
	(Denmark) Jayden Schmidt	Gas Gas													DNQ	DNQ							0
	(Netherlands) Kevin Buitenhuis	Yamaha													DNQ	DNQ							0
	(Belgium) Nicolas Vennekens	Gas Gas													DNQ	DNQ							0
	(Belgium) Sam Jordant	Yamaha													DNQ	DNQ							0
	(Norway) Råg Rindal	Yamaha															DNQ	DNQ					0
	(Norway) Odin Ramseng Haseth	KTM															DNQ	DNQ					0
	(Peru) Bruno Alvarez	Yamaha																			DNQ	DNQ	0
Pos	Rider	Bike	LOM		POR (Portugal)		ITA (Italy)		SAR (Sardinia)		FRA (France)		GER (Germany)		FLA (Flanders)		SWE (Sweden)		FIN (Finland)		CHA		Points

=== Manufacturers Championship ===
Pos	Bike	LOM		POR (Portugal)		ITA (Italy)		SAR (Sardinia)		FRA (France)		GER (Germany)		FLA (Flanders)		SWE (Sweden)		FIN (Finland)		CHA		Points
1	Yamaha	1	4	1	1	7	3	1	1	2	3	1	1	2	3	8	4	4	2	8	11	405
2	Husqvarna	19	15	3	3	2	14	4	2	7	2	3	2	1	1	6	1	1	1	1	1	385
3	KTM	2	2	2	4	4	4	6	8	1	5	5	3	7	2	3	6	2	4	2	3	378
4	Fantic	4	1	5	2	1	1	7	4	9	1	7	7	6	6	1	2	3	3	16	7	364
5	Kawasaki	8	11	16	8	12	6	5	6	4	6	4	6	4	11	2	3	7	6	3	4	299
6	Gas Gas	35	30	7	7	17	8	14	16	19	20	20	20	15	10	14	16	15	14	12	13	121
7	TM	29	Ret							13	16	Ret	26									13
8	Honda	30	DNS			23	30	25	Ret			Ret	Ret					19	16			7
	Suzuki											DNQ	DNQ									0
Pos	Bike	LOM		POR (Portugal)		ITA (Italy)		SAR (Sardinia)		FRA (France)		GER (Germany)		FLA (Flanders)		SWE (Sweden)		FIN (Finland)		CHA		Points

== EMX125 ==
A 9-round calendar for the 2022 season was announced on 17 November 2021. EMX125 is for riders competing on 2-stroke motorcycles of 125cc.

=== Calendar ===
Round	Date	Grand Prix	Location	Race 1 Winner	Race 2 Winner	Round Winner	Report
1	27 February	Great Britain	Matterley Basin	(Italy) Ferruccio Zanchi	(Netherlands) Cas Valk	(Netherlands) Cas Valk	
2	10 April	Trentino	Pietramurata	(France) Alexis Fueri	(France) Alexis Fueri	(France) Alexis Fueri	
3	24 April	Latvia	Ķegums	(Latvia) Jānis Reišulis	(Netherlands) Cas Valk	(Netherlands) Cas Valk	
4	29 May	Spain	intu Xanadú	(France) Alexis Fueri	(Netherlands) Ivano van Erp	(Netherlands) Ivano van Erp	
5	5 June	France	Ernée	(Netherlands) Cas Valk	(Latvia) Kārlis Reišulis	(Netherlands) Cas Valk	
6	12 June	Germany	Teutschenthal	(Latvia) Kārlis Reišulis	(France) Alexis Fueri	(France) Alexis Fueri	
7	24 July	Flanders	Lommel	(Czech Republic) Julius Mikula	(Latvia) Jānis Reišulis	(Latvia) Jānis Reišulis	
8	7 August	Sweden	Uddevalla	(Netherlands) Ivano van Erp	(Latvia) Jānis Reišulis	(Netherlands) Ivano van Erp	
9	14 August	Finland	Hyvinkää	(Netherlands) Ivano van Erp	(Netherlands) Ivano van Erp	(Netherlands) Ivano van Erp	

=== Entry list ===
Team	Constructor	No	Rider	Rounds
Wozniak MX Racing Team	Yamaha	2	(Denmark) Nicolai Skovbjerg	1–3, 6–8
KTM Sarholz Racing Team	Husqvarna	3	(Germany) Linus Jung	6, 8
Team Castellari	Gas Gas	4	(Italy) Giovanni Meneghello	2–6
Team Castellari	Gas Gas	10	(Italy) Giorgio Macri	2, 4, 6
Team Pavo Rueda	Gas Gas	5	(Spain) Daniel Rodríguez	4–5
Team Pavo Rueda	Gas Gas	362	(Spain) Marco Alonso	4–6
RFME Gas Gas MX Junior Team	Gas Gas	6	(Spain) Elias Escandell	1–6
RFME Gas Gas MX Junior Team	Gas Gas	29	(Spain) Francisco García	2–3, 7–9
RFME Gas Gas MX Junior Team	Gas Gas	305	(Spain) Antonio Gallego	1–7
RFME Gas Gas MX Junior Team	Gas Gas	373	(Spain) Edgar Canet	1, 4–9
	KTM	7	(France) Victor Mauresa	5
	Husqvarna	8	(Netherlands) Daan Hofstede	7–8
MX Team Borger	Yamaha	15	(Netherlands) Svenn Borger	7
737 Performance Gas Gas Oxmoto	Gas Gas	17	(France) Jean-Paul Piacentini	2, 5
737 Performance Gas Gas Oxmoto	Gas Gas	317	(France) Mathis Valin	2–7
Dream Team Husqvarna	Husqvarna	18	(Italy) Alessandro Gaspari	2–7
Dream Team Husqvarna	Husqvarna	684	(Latvia) Uldis Freibergs	2–7
Team MRC Racing	KTM	21	(Italy) Nathan Mariani	2–5
	KTM	23	(France) Nathan Lochet	5
	KTM	24	(Bulgaria) Hristiyan Georgiev	1
Bloody Harry Energy - RGS MX Team	KTM	27	(Israel) Ofir Casey Tzemach	1–2, 5–9
GRMXPro	Husqvarna	29	(Spain) Francisco García	4–5
Husqvarna Lille Vitamine H	Gas Gas	30	(France) Simon de Ruyter	2, 5–7
MX Training	Yamaha	32	(Norway) Leander Thunshelle	8–9
F4E Gas Gas Racing Team	Gas Gas	37	(South Africa) Cuan Conway	2–3, 5–6
F4E Gas Gas Racing Team	Gas Gas	155	(Belgium) Troy Verburgh	1–3, 5–9
Team ATV Racing	Yamaha	42	(Sweden) Hugo Forsgren	7–8
Sturm STC Racing Team	KTM	43	(Latvia) Roberts Lūsis	2–3, 6–9
Sturm STC Racing Team	KTM	282	(France) Marc-Antoine Rossi	8
Passion Racing Gas Gas	Gas Gas	44	(United Kingdom) George Hopkins	1
Yamaha Europe EMX125 MJC	Yamaha	47	(Latvia) Kārlis Reišulis	All
Yamaha Europe EMX125 MJC	Yamaha	73	(Italy) Ferruccio Zanchi	All
Yamaha Europe EMX125 MJC	Yamaha	432	(Netherlands) Ivano van Erp	All
AIT Racing Team	KTM	49	(Bulgaria) Marios Kanakis	2–3, 9
SIXTYTWO Motosport Husqvarna Team	Husqvarna	54	(Slovenia) Tilen Demšič	2
SIXTYTWO Motosport Husqvarna Team	Husqvarna	123	(Slovenia) Jaka Peklaj	2–6, 8–9
Team New Bike Yamaha	Yamaha	55	(France) Mathis Barthez	5
AMX Racing Team	KTM	57	(Lithuania) Neilas Pečatauskas	2, 6
SE Team	Yamaha	59	(Finland) Miko Pirinen	9
	KTM	71	(Finland) Arttu Sahlstén	9
TBS Conversions Racing Team	KTM	77	(Israel) Erez Melman	2–7
JK Racing Yamaha	Yamaha	79	(Italy) Nicola Salvini	1
JK Racing Yamaha	Yamaha	446	(France) Adrien Petit	All
DT101 Follo MX	Yamaha	82	(Norway) Christian Thue	8
DT101 Follo MX	Yamaha	215	(Norway) Brede Gultvedt	8
Hofstede MX Team	Husqvarna	86	(Netherlands) Jesper Gils	7
Hofstede MX Team	Husqvarna	400	(Netherlands) Roan Tolsma	7
Tech32	KTM	88	(Italy) Matteo Luigi Russi	1–5, 8–9
Tech32	KTM	282	(France) Marc-Antoine Rossi	1–6
Tech32	KTM	716	(Hungary) Noel Zanócz	8–9
Crescent Yamaha	Yamaha	89	(United Kingdom) Jacob Randall	5
MB Motocross Team	Yamaha	91	(Norway) Oliver Martinsen	8
Jezyk Racing Team	KTM	96	(Spain) Mauro Osinalde	2, 4–7, 9
KTM Racestore MX2	KTM	97	(Italy) Simone Mancini	2, 4–7
	Yamaha	100	(France) Tom Caneele	7
Arcabo MX Team	KTM	101	(Netherlands) Mirco ten Kate	2
ASA United Gas Gas	Gas Gas	102	(United Kingdom) Tyla Hooley	1
SJP Moto KTM	KTM	104	(United Kingdom) Reece Jones	1
SJP Moto KTM	KTM	422	(United Kingdom) Charlie Heyman	1
Becker Racing	Husqvarna	105	(Denmark) Lucas Bruhn	7
Becker Racing	KTM	633	(Denmark) Jakob Frandsen	7
KTL Racing Team	KTM	110	(Estonia) Richard Paat	2–3, 8–9
Ecomaxx Cross	KTM	111	(Netherlands) Damian Knuiman	7
	Husqvarna	121	(Italy) Alex Trento	2
3MX Team	Gas Gas	125	(Italy) Mattia Barbieri	2, 5–6
Team Borz MX	Husqvarna	127	(Italy) Michael Rabensteiner	2
MTA MX Racing	KTM	141	(Italy) Francesco Bellei	2
Bardahl Junior Racing Team	KTM	146	(Italy) Davide Brandini	2
	Husqvarna	162	(Sweden) Filip Larsson	8–9
Matt Gardiner MX	KTM	163	(United Kingdom) Ben Mustoe	1
Fantic Factory Team Maddii	Fantic	172	(Netherlands) Cas Valk	All
Fantic Factory Team Maddii	Fantic	717	(France) Alexis Fueri	All
Team Bloms MX Racing	Husqvarna	176	(Sweden) Albin Werkander	8
Team Bike World	KTM	177	(Finland) Aaro Menna	9
WZ Racing Team	KTM	191	(Latvia) Martins Platkēvičs	2–3, 7
WZ Racing Team	KTM	714	(Latvia) Markuss Ozoliņš	1, 4
	Husqvarna	197	(Croatia) Matija Šterpin	2
	Husqvarna	204	(Australia) Liam Owens	5–6
Fashion Bike	Husqvarna	217	(Italy) Brando Rispoli	2–3, 5–7
Team Giorgio	Gas Gas	220	(France) Toni Giorgessi	4–5, 7
Dafy Moto Saint-Quentin	Gas Gas	223	(France) Alexandre Viltard	7
	KTM	225	(Norway) Marius Nordbø	8–9
Gas Gas Scandinavia	Gas Gas	226	(Norway) Sebastian Carlsen	8
Ghidinelli Fantic Racing Team	Fantic	232	(Spain) Unai Aguiló	2, 4–7
Team VRT KTM Veritise	KTM	238	(France) Tom Brunet	1–7, 9
Team Insubria Yamaha	Yamaha	253	(Italy) Francesco Gazzano	2, 4–5
Team Insubria Yamaha	Yamaha	329	(Italy) Maurizio Scollo	2, 4–6
Team Insubria Yamaha	Yamaha	440	(Italy) Andrea Brilli	2, 4–6
KGMX Team	Yamaha	259	(Norway) Martin Bredesen	5, 8
KGMX Team	Husqvarna	471	(Norway) Pelle Gundersen	8
	KTM	268	(Finland) Juuso Ylipahkala	9
Schmicker Racing	KTM	275	(Germany) Eric Rakow	6, 8
EastMX Gas Gas	Gas Gas	277	(Finland) Viljami Kyllönen	9
EastMX Gas Gas	Gas Gas	309	(Finland) Santeri Oinonen	9
	Gas Gas	285	(Norway) Patrick Valbjorn	6, 8–9
Yamaha E.Castro	Yamaha	300	(Spain) Salvador Pérez	4
Team LF Motorsport 301	Yamaha	301	(France) Noah Vampa	1–8
Forsheda Hus AB/Axelent Sverige	Yamaha	315	(Sweden) Olle Mårtensson	8
	KTM	321	(Italy) Alessandro Traversini	2–3, 5–9
DT Works Racing	Gas Gas	324	(Spain) Carlos Salvador	4–7, 9
Destination MX/ CI Sport KTM	KTM	326	(United Kingdom) Wal Beaney	1
	KTM	331	(Lithuania) Jokūbas Skeberdis	3
MRT Motorstore Racing Team	Husqvarna	336	(Italy) Lorenzo Aglietti	2
Oragno114 Husqvarna Racing	Husqvarna	337	(Italy) Holiver Brizio	2, 5–6
Delta Team Krško	Yamaha	342	(Slovenia) Žan Oven	2
Ausio Racing Team	Yamaha	351	(Spain) Carlos Prat	4
JPV Team 2024	KTM	358	(Finland) Nico Stenberg	2–5, 9
MX-Handel Racing Team	Husqvarna	363	(Switzerland) Lyonel Reichl	2, 5–7
Benimoto Party Satelite	Husqvarna	370	(Spain) Xavier Camps	4
Difrenos Motos	Gas Gas	382	(Spain) Manuel López	4
	KTM	401	(Netherlands) Lotte van Drunen	1–5, 7–9
DVS Racing Store 114 Gas Gas	Gas Gas	407	(United Kingdom) Jake Davies	1, 7
Store 114	KTM	410	(United Kingdom) James Barker	1–7
SH Racing	Husqvarna	418	(Finland) Saku Mansikkamäki	2–3, 6
	KTM	417	(Belgium) Hugo Buchelot	6–7
GRT Impact KTM	KTM	419	(United Kingdom) Joe Brookes	1, 4–6
GRT Impact KTM	KTM	456	(United Kingdom) Ollie Colmer	1–2, 4–7
KTM Kosak Team	KTM	428	(Germany) Henry Obenland	All
KTM Kosak Team	KTM	494	(Germany) Maximilian Werner	1–4
Diga Procross KTM Racing	KTM	494	(Germany) Maximilian Werner	5–9
ICEONE Racing	Husqvarna	430	(Finland) Tiitus Räikkönen	2–3, 7, 9
MB Motocross Team	KTM	431	(Norway) Markus Sommerstad	7
	Husqvarna	436	(Belgium) Tias Callens	1, 5–7
	Husqvarna	447	(Czech Republic) Jiří Klejšmíd	2, 6
MP Racing Oy	Husqvarna	450	(Finland) Simo Koskinen	9
	KTM	451	(Czech Republic) Julius Mikula	All
	KTM	457	(Germany) Paul Neunzling	2, 6–7
RX Moto Husqvarna	Husqvarna	461	(Finland) Eero Peippo	2–9
	KTM	466	(Czech Republic) Vaclav Janout	6–7
KTM Scandinavia	KTM	474	(Sweden) Linus Persson	7–8
NEXT LEVEL Motocross Team	Yamaha	478	(Norway) Adrian Bølviken	2, 5–6, 8–9
Cermen Racing Team	KTM	479	(Czech Republic) Vítězslav Marek	All
MotoXchange Yamaha	Yamaha	480	(Finland) Kasimir Hindersson	1, 3
KTM Motopalvelu	KTM	480	(Finland) Kasimir Hindersson	9
Brouwer Motors Jumbo Gas Gas	Gas Gas	485	(Netherlands) Senna van Voorst	7–8
YRC Yamaha Scandinavia	Yamaha	487	(Norway) Elias Auclair	2, 6–9
Champ Factory KTM Israel	KTM	505	(Israel) Ben Almagor	7
MX-Shop KTM	KTM	515	(Denmark) Mads Fredsøe	2–8
VM Racing	Husqvarna	518	(Belgium) Douwe Van Mechgelen	7
ML MX Team	Husqvarna	521	(Belgium) Jarno Goossens	7
BCS MX KTM	KTM	522	(United Kingdom) Ashton Boughen	1
	Yamaha	524	(Belgium) Emile De Baere	7
	Gas Gas	530	(Germany) John Vogelwaid	1–2
	KTM	539	(Poland) Seweryn Gazda	6–7
Husqvarna Scandinavia	Husqvarna	543	(Sweden) Laban Alm	3, 7–9
Team KTM Motopalvelu	KTM	553	(Finland) Kaapo Kalatie	3, 9
Hitachi KTM fuelled by Milwaukee	KTM	555	(United Kingdom) Cole McCullough	2–9
Motostar Yamaha Scandinavia	Yamaha	560	(Sweden) Liam Åkerlund	8–9
Motivation Motosport	KTM	567	(Netherlands) Levi Schrik	2–3, 6–9
Ljunggrens Motor	KTM	587	(Sweden) Alfons Lindström	8
Silve Racing	KTM	595	(Finland) Eliel Lehtinen	7–9
MX Moduls	Husqvarna	611	(Latvia) Markuss Kokins	3
KTM Eesti Marmorest	KTM	612	(Estonia) Joosep Parn	1, 6
Motorex Husqvarna BeLux	Husqvarna	634	(Belgium) Maeron Peeters	7
Rodeo MX Racing Team	KTM	641	(Latvia) Tomass Šaicāns	3
	Husqvarna	655	(Estonia) Romeo Pikand	2–3, 7–9
	KTM	690	(Estonia) Tristan Uiga	3, 9
Motokeidas	KTM	707	(Finland) Iiro Tofferi	9
Quaglio Racing Technologies	KTM	709	(Italy) Pietro Dal Fitto	2
	KTM	712	(France) Pierrick Castan	5
Pardi Racing KTM	KTM	716	(Hungary) Noel Zanócz	7
Team WID Motorsport	KTM	720	(France) Ilann Werlé	2, 5
	KTM	738	(Poland) Bartosz Jaworski	3, 6–7
	Husqvarna	744	(Estonia) Sebastian Leok	2–3, 6–9
KMP Honda Racing	Gas Gas	770	(Germany) Leon Rudolph	2, 6
KTM Motofavorīts MX Team	KTM	772	(Latvia) Jānis Reišulis	All
KTM Kosak Team	KTM	777	(Switzerland) Fabio Artho	2
Pro Factory Racing Team	Gas Gas	798	(France) Arnaud Colson	2, 4–6
Loukko.com Racing Team	KTM	882	(Finland) Heikki Vähäpesola	9
	KTM	884	(France) Leo Bordini	5
We.Love.Moto Racing Team	Yamaha	888	(Netherlands) Eric van Helvoirt	7
Dirtbike Racing Team	Gas Gas	894	(Italy) Patrick Busatto	2
HSV Ried	Husqvarna	919	(Austria) Maximilian Ernecker	1–3, 5–9
	KTM	920	(Sweden) Sandro Sols	8
	KTM	939	(Denmark) Emil Lodal	8
QualityMX Racing Team	KTM	949	(Netherlands) Finn Pullen	2, 7
JE68 KTM Scandinavia	KTM	961	(Sweden) August Frisk	1–2, 5–9

=== Riders Championship ===
Pos	Rider	Bike	GBR (United Kingdom)		TRE		LAT (Latvia)		ESP (Spain)		FRA (France)		GER (Germany)		FLA (Flanders)		SWE (Sweden)		FIN (Finland)		Points
1	(Netherlands) Cas Valk	Fantic	2	1	2	8	3	1	2	5	1	2	4	2	6	2	5	5	3	2	363
2	(Latvia) Kārlis Reišulis	Yamaha	Ret	7	3	2	2	3	6	2	3	1	1	10	4	3	Ret	4	2	3	314
3	(Latvia) Jānis Reišulis	KTM	3	4	Ret	17	1	5	3	4	8	7	5	6	2	1	4	1	4	7	301
4	(France) Alexis Fueri	Fantic	4	2	1	1	Ret	7	1	12	2	4	2	1	13	17	7	2	9	12	294
5	(Netherlands) Ivano van Erp	Yamaha	Ret	6	11	4	4	4	5	1	4	3	Ret	4	3	Ret	1	3	1	1	291
6	(Czech Republic) Julius Mikula	KTM	28	8	6	5	9	9	8	Ret	7	8	Ret	7	1	4	15	8	11	4	212
7	(Italy) Ferruccio Zanchi	Yamaha	1	Ret	Ret	11	5	2	35	18	DNQ	DNQ	3	3	21	Ret	2	10	Ret	6	164
8	(France) Marc-Antoine Rossi	KTM	7	3	Ret	19	6	12	4	3	14	5	8	9			12	Ret			155
9	(France) Adrien Petit	Yamaha	9	19	18	18	7	14	17	8	11	15	14	15	11	9	16	20	18	15	124
10	(Spain) Francisco García	Gas Gas			7	16	10	6							10	5	8	21	5	Ret	123
10	(Spain) Francisco García	Husqvarna							9	11	DNS	DNS									123
11	(Czech Republic) Vítězslav Marek	KTM	17	Ret	14	3	14	10	18	14	Ret	24	10	12	Ret	30	10	12	13	16	112
12	(France) Mathis Valin	Gas Gas			8	29	21	13	7	6	5	9	20	11	34	7					103
13	(Spain) Elias Escandell	Gas Gas	5	5	4	22	11	Ret	10	7	12	18	Ret	DNS							97
14	(Spain) Edgar Canet	Gas Gas	Ret	DNS					11	28	10	25	12	5	7	14	20	22	7	9	94
15	(Italy) Matteo Luigi Russi	KTM	6	11	5	7	12	8	Ret	Ret	Ret	Ret					22	9	19	Ret	91
16	(Germany) Maximilian Werner	KTM	Ret	18	15	13	Ret	Ret	16	20	DNS	DNS	Ret	19	8	16	11	7	27	5	83
17	(Sweden) Laban Alm	Husqvarna					8	11							Ret	Ret	3	6	8	10	82
18	(Denmark) Mads Fredsøe	KTM			23	21	16	20	19	16	Ret	10	28	14	9	6	6	DNS			73
19	(Spain) Antonio Gallego	Gas Gas	Ret	10	Ret	15	34	18	12	35	27	Ret	7	8	15	18					65
20	(Denmark) Nicolai Skovbjerg	Yamaha	Ret	16	19	25	13	15					DNQ	DNQ	5	11	18	18			53
21	(France) Arnaud Colson	Gas Gas			9	14			15	10	17	Ret	15	18							49
22	(Austria) Maximilian Ernecker	Husqvarna	10	12	22	28	Ret	31			Ret	11	31	33	DNQ	DNQ	14	Ret	21	13	45
23	(Sweden) August Frisk	KTM	15	21	Ret	DNS					31	16	DNQ	DNQ	Ret	24	17	14	15	11	38
24	(Finland) Kasimir Hindersson	Yamaha	13	24			25	Ret													36
24	(Finland) Kasimir Hindersson	KTM																	6	8	36
25	(United Kingdom) Joe Brookes	KTM	Ret	26					13	34	9	Ret	11	16							35
26	(France) Toni Giorgessi	Gas Gas							14	9	6	Ret			26	22					34
27	(United Kingdom) Ollie Colmer	KTM	11	17	DNQ	DNQ			26	15	Ret	12	32	Ret	18	19					34
28	(Finland) Nico Stenberg	KTM			16	10	19	26	21	27	25	17							14	17	33
29	(Italy) Simone Mancini	KTM			27	23			25	17	18	Ret	6	13	DNQ	DNQ					30
30	(Latvia) Roberts Lūsis	KTM			DNQ	DNQ	22	22					22	20	12	21	21	19	10	14	30
31	(Latvia) Uldis Freibergs	Husqvarna			10	26	15	Ret	DNQ	DNQ	21	Ret	29	24	16	13					30
32	(Germany) Eric Rakow	KTM											9	27			13	13			28
33	(United Kingdom) Charlie Heyman	KTM	8	9																	25
34	(France) Tom Brunet	KTM	22	20	DNQ	DNQ	32	25	32	13	22	6	Ret	34	DNQ	DNQ			Ret	34	24
35	(Italy) Brando Rispoli	Husqvarna			31	9	28	35			16	20	Ret	17	DNQ	DNQ					22
36	(Slovenia) Jaka Peklaj	Husqvarna			12	20	Ret	16	27	32	19	23	25	22			Ret	16	24	27	22
37	(Italy) Alessandro Gaspari	Husqvarna			Ret	33	27	19	20	21	20	13	19	35	19	15					22
38	(Denmark) Lucas Bruhn	Husqvarna													14	8					20
39	(Italy) Mattia Barbieri	Gas Gas			Ret	6					Ret	22	17	Ret							19
40	(Sweden) Linus Persson	KTM													33	Ret	9	15			18
41	(Spain) Unai Aguiló	Fantic			13	Ret			Ret	Ret	15	28	18	Ret	DNQ	DNQ					17
42	(Hungary) Noel Zanócz	KTM													Ret	25	Ret	11	16	23	15
43	(United Kingdom) Ben Mustoe	KTM	12	15																	15
44	(Norway) Adrian Bølviken	Yamaha			28	24					23	14	13	Ret			29	25	DNQ	DNQ	15
45	(Netherlands) Lotte van Drunen	KTM	30	32	DNQ	DNQ	20	21	33	29	DNQ	DNQ			24	10	DNQ	30	30	19	14
46	(Finland) Eliel Lehtinen	KTM													Ret	20	23	28	12	29	10
47	(United Kingdom) Wal Beaney	KTM	18	14																	10
48	(Italy) Maurizio Scollo	Yamaha			26	12			DNQ	DNQ	DNQ	DNQ	Ret	21							9
49	(Denmark) Jakob Frandsen	KTM													28	12					9
50	(France) Mathis Barthez	Yamaha									13	21									8
51	(Italy) Nicola Salvini	Yamaha	Ret	13																	8
52	(United Kingdom) Reece Jones	KTM	14	22																	7
53	(Latvia) Tomass Šaicāns	KTM					18	17													7
54	(Switzerland) Lyonel Reichl	Husqvarna			DNQ	DNQ					DNQ	DNQ	16	30	20	27					6
55	(Israel) Ofir Casey Tzemach	KTM	19	Ret	DNQ	DNQ					DNQ	DNQ	DNQ	DNQ	DNQ	DNQ	24	17	DNQ	DNQ	6
56	(United Kingdom) Tyla Hooley	Gas Gas	16	Ret																	5
57	(Estonia) Tristan Uiga	KTM					26	28											17	21	4
58	(Poland) Bartosz Jaworski	KTM					30	29					DNQ	DNQ	17	32					4
59	(Italy) Patrick Busatto	Gas Gas			17	36															4
60	(Finland) Saku Mansikkamäki	Husqvarna			DNQ	DNQ	17	Ret					DNQ	DNQ							4
61	(Finland) Aaro Menna	KTM																	Ret	18	3
62	(France) Noah Vampa	Yamaha	21	25	DNQ	DNQ	DNQ	DNQ	24	23	24	19	DNS	31	DNQ	DNQ	DNQ	DNQ			2
63	(Spain) Mauro Osinalde	KTM			DNQ	DNQ			23	19	Ret	27	DNQ	DNQ	25	33			26	25	2
64	(Sweden) Hugo Forsgren	Yamaha													27	35	19	24			2
65	(Norway) Elias Auclair	Yamaha			Ret	DNS							DSQ	28	23	28	25	26	22	20	1
66	(United Kingdom) James Barker	KTM	20	23	30	27	35	24	30	33	DNQ	DNQ	DNQ	DNQ	DNQ	DNQ					1
67	(Italy) Holiver Brizio	Husqvarna			20	Ret					Ret	30	27	25							1
68	(Norway) Marius Nordbø	KTM															33	27	20	28	1
	(United Kingdom) Cole McCullough	KTM			DNQ	DNQ	23	33	36	24	DNQ	DNQ	21	Ret	22	23	34	23	Ret	26	0
	(Italy) Giovanni Meneghello	Gas Gas			21	Ret	31	23	31	26	26	26	30	23							0
	(Spain) Marco Alonso	Gas Gas							22	22	30	32	23	26							0
	(Estonia) Sebastian Leok	Husqvarna			DNQ	DNQ	29	34					DNQ	DNQ	30	26	27	29	23	22	0
	(Bulgaria) Hristiyan Georgiev	KTM	23	28																	0
	(Estonia) Joosep Pärn	KTM	25	DNS									24	29							0
	(United Kingdom) Ashton Boughen	KTM	24	27																	0
	(Italy) Francesco Gazzano	Yamaha			24	Ret			28	Ret	DNQ	DNQ									0
	(Spain) Carlos Salvador	Gas Gas							DSQ	30	Ret	Ret	DNQ	DNQ	DNQ	DNQ			33	24	0
	(Latvia) Markuss Kokins	Husqvarna					24	32													0
	(Italy) Andrea Brilli	Yamaha			25	30			DNQ	DNQ	DNQ	DNQ	DNQ	DNQ							0
	(Finland) Santeri Oinonen	Gas Gas																	25	31	0
	(Spain) Carlos Prat	Yamaha							37	25											0
	(Australia) Liam Owens	Husqvarna									29	29	26	32							0
	(Germany) John Vogelwaid	Gas Gas	26	29	DNQ	DNQ															0
	(Sweden) Alfons Lindström	KTM															26	31			0
	(Belgium) Tias Callens	Husqvarna	27	31							DNQ	DNQ	DNQ	DNQ	DNQ	DNQ					0
	(Italy) Nathan Mariani	KTM			DNQ	DNQ	33	27	DNQ	DNQ	DNQ	DNQ									0
	(Netherlands) Levi Schrik	KTM			DNQ	DNQ	DNQ	DNQ					DNQ	DNQ	29	29	DNQ	DNQ	28	Ret	0
	(France) Pierrick Castan	KTM									28	31									0
	(Sweden) Liam Åkerlund	Yamaha															28	Ret	DNQ	DNQ	0
	(Germany) Henry Obenland	KTM	29	30	DNQ	DNQ	DNQ	DNQ	DNQ	DNQ	DNQ	DNQ	DNQ	DNQ	DNQ	DNQ	31	34	DNQ	DNQ	0
	(Estonia) Romeo Pikand	Husqvarna			DNQ	DNQ	DSQ	30							DNQ	DNQ	DNQ	DNQ	29	Ret	0
	(Spain) Salvador Pérez	Yamaha							29	31											0
	(Italy) Lorenzo Aglietti	Husqvarna			29	32															0
	(Norway) Patrick Valbjorn	Gas Gas											DNQ	DNQ			30	33	DNQ	DNQ	0
	(Finland) Heikki Vähäpesola	KTM																	DNQ	30	0
	(Latvia) Martins Platkēvičs	KTM			DNQ	DNQ	DNQ	DNQ							32	31					0
	(Belgium) Troy Verburgh	Gas Gas	31	33	DNQ	DNQ	DNQ	DNQ			DNQ	DNQ	DNQ	DNQ	DNQ	DNQ	DNQ	DNQ	DNQ	DNQ	0
	(Finland) Simo Koskinen	Husqvarna																	31	33	0
	(Poland) Seweryn Gazda	KTM											DNQ	DNQ	31	Ret					0
	(Bulgaria) Marios Kanakis	KTM			DNQ	31	DNQ	DNQ											DNQ	DNQ	0
	(Sweden) Filip Larsson	Husqvarna															32	32	Ret	Ret	0
	(Lithuania) Neilas Pečatauskas	KTM			32	34							DNQ	DNQ							0
	(Finland) Arttu Sahlstén	KTM																	34	32	0
	(Finland) Kaapo Kalatie	KTM					DNQ	DNQ											32	35	0
	(United Kingdom) George Hopkins	Gas Gas	32	Ret																	0
	(Spain) Manuel López	Gas Gas							34	Ret											0
	(Netherlands) Damian Knuiman	KTM													Ret	34					0
	(Norway) Leander Thunshelle	Yamaha															35	Ret	DNQ	DNQ	0
	(Croatia) Matija Šterpin	Husqvarna			DNQ	35															0
	(Estonia) Richard Paat	KTM			DNQ	DNQ	DNQ	DNQ									36	Ret	DNQ	DNQ	0
	(Finland) Eero Peippo	Husqvarna			DNQ	DNQ	DNQ	DNQ	DNQ	DNQ	DNQ	DNQ	DNQ	DNQ	DNQ	DNQ	DNQ	DNQ	Ret	DNS	0
	(Sweden) Olle Mårtensson	Yamaha															Ret	DNS			0
	(United Kingdom) Jake Davies	Gas Gas	DNQ	Ret											DNQ	DNQ					0
	(Latvia) Markuss Ozoliņš	KTM	DNS	DNS					DNQ	DNQ											0
	(Italy) Alessandro Traversini	KTM			DNQ	DNQ	DNQ	DNQ			DNQ	DNQ	DNQ	DNQ	DNQ	DNQ	DNQ	DNQ	DNQ	DNQ	0
	(Israel) Erez Melman	KTM			DNQ	DNQ	DNQ	DNQ	DNQ	DNQ	DNQ	DNQ	DNQ	DNQ	DNQ	DNQ					0
	(South Africa) Cuan Conway	Gas Gas			DNQ	DNQ	DNQ	DNQ			DNQ	DNQ	DNQ	DNQ							0
	(Finland) Tiitus Räikkönen	Husqvarna			DNQ	DNQ	DNQ	DNQ							DNQ	DNQ			DNQ	DNQ	0
	(France) Simon de Ruyter	Gas Gas			DNQ	DNQ					DNQ	DNQ	DNQ	DNQ	DNQ	DNQ					0
	(Italy) Giorgio Macri	Gas Gas			DNQ	DNQ			DNQ	DNQ			DNQ	DNQ							0
	(Germany) Paul Neunzling	KTM			DNQ	DNQ							DNQ	DNQ	DNQ	DNQ					0
	(France) Jean-Paul Piacentini	Gas Gas			DNQ	DNQ					DNQ	DNQ									0
	(France) Ilann Werlé	KTM			DNQ	DNQ					DNQ	DNQ									0
	(Germany) Leon Rudolph	Gas Gas			DNQ	DNQ							DNQ	DNQ							0
	(Czech Republic) Jiří Klejšmíd	Husqvarna			DNQ	DNQ							DNQ	DNQ							0
	(Netherlands) Finn Pullen	KTM			DNQ	DNQ									DNQ	DNQ					0
	(Spain) Daniel Rodríguez	Gas Gas							DNQ	DNQ	DNQ	DNQ									0
	(Norway) Martin Bredesen	Yamaha									DNQ	DNQ					DNQ	DNQ			0
	(Belgium) Hugo Buchelot	KTM											DNQ	DNQ	DNQ	DNQ					0
	(Czech Republic) Václav Janout	KTM											DNQ	DNQ	DNQ	DNQ					0
	(Germany) Linus Jung	Husqvarna											DNQ	DNQ			DNQ	DNQ			0
	(Netherlands) Senna van Voorst	Gas Gas													DNQ	DNQ	DNQ	DNQ			0
	(Netherlands) Daan Hofstede	Husqvarna													DNQ	DNQ	DNQ	DNQ			0
	(Italy) Pietro Dal Fitto	KTM			DNQ	DNQ															0
	(Switzerland) Fabio Artho	KTM			DNQ	DNQ															0
	(Italy) Alex Trento	Husqvarna			DNQ	DNQ															0
	(Slovenia) Tilen Demšič	Husqvarna			DNQ	DNQ															0
	(Slovenia) Žan Oven	Yamaha			DNQ	DNQ															0
	(Italy) Michael Rabensteiner	Husqvarna			DNQ	DNQ															0
	(Italy) Davide Brandini	KTM			DNQ	DNQ															0
	(Italy) Francesco Bellei	KTM			DNQ	DNQ															0
	(Netherlands) Mirco ten Kate	KTM			DNQ	DNQ															0
	(Lithuania) Jokūbas Skeberdis	KTM					DNQ	DNQ													0
	(Spain) Xavier Camps	Husqvarna							DNQ	DNQ											0
	(France) Leo Bordini	KTM									DNQ	DNQ									0
	(United Kingdom) Jacob Randall	Yamaha									DNQ	DNQ									0
	(France) Victor Mauresa	KTM									DNQ	DNQ									0
	(France) Nathan Lochet	KTM									DNQ	DNQ									0
	(Netherlands) Eric van Helvoirt	Yamaha													DNQ	DNQ					0
	(France) Alexandre Viltard	Gas Gas													DNQ	DNQ					0
	(Israel) Ben Almagor	KTM													DNQ	DNQ					0
	(Norway) Markus Sommerstad	KTM													DNQ	DNQ					0
	(Belgium) Douwe Van Mechgelen	Husqvarna													DNQ	DNQ					0
	(Netherlands) Roan Tolsma	Husqvarna													DNQ	DNQ					0
	(Netherlands) Svenn Borger	Yamaha													DNQ	DNQ					0
	(Belgium) Maeron Peeters	Husqvarna													DNQ	DNQ					0
	(Belgium) Emile De Baere	Yamaha													DNQ	DNQ					0
	(France) Tom Caneele	Yamaha													DNQ	DNQ					0
	(Netherlands) Jesper Gils	Husqvarna													DNQ	DNQ					0
	(Belgium) Jarno Goossens	Husqvarna													DNQ	DNQ					0
	(Sweden) Sandro Sols	KTM															DNQ	DNQ			0
	(Norway) Pelle Gundersen	Husqvarna															DNQ	DNQ			0
	(Sweden) Albin Werkander	Husqvarna															DNQ	DNQ			0
	(Norway) Brede Gultvedt	Yamaha															DNQ	DNQ			0
	(Norway) Oliver Martinsen	Yamaha															DNQ	DNQ			0
	(Norway) Sebastian Carlsen	Gas Gas															DNQ	DNQ			0
	(Denmark) Emil Lodal	KTM															DNQ	DNQ			0
	(Norway) Christian Thue	Yamaha															DNQ	DNQ			0
	(Finland) Iiro Tofferi	KTM																	DNQ	DNQ	0
	(Finland) Juuso Ylipahkala	KTM																	DNQ	DNQ	0
	(Finland) Viljami Kyllönen	Gas Gas																	DNQ	DNQ	0
	(Finland) Miko Pirinen	Yamaha																	DNQ	DNQ	0
Pos	Rider	Bike	GBR (United Kingdom)		TRE		LAT (Latvia)		ESP (Spain)		FRA (France)		GER (Germany)		FLA (Flanders)		SWE (Sweden)		FIN (Finland)		Points

=== Manufacturers Championship ===
Pos	Bike	GBR (United Kingdom)		TRE		LAT (Latvia)		ESP (Spain)		FRA (France)		GER (Germany)		FLA (Flanders)		SWE (Sweden)		FIN (Finland)		Points
1	Fantic	2	1	1	1	3	1	1	5	1	2	2	1	6	2	5	2	3	2	394
2	Yamaha	1	6	3	2	2	2	5	1	3	1	1	3	3	3	1	3	1	1	392
3	KTM	3	3	5	3	6	8	3	3	7	5	5	6	1	1	4	1	4	4	334
4	Gas Gas	5	5	4	6	10	6	7	6	5	9	7	5	7	5	8	21	5	9	249
5	Husqvarna	10	12	10	9	1	5	9	11	16	11	16	17	14	8	3	6	8	10	209
Pos	Bike	GBR (United Kingdom)		TRE		LAT (Latvia)		ESP (Spain)		FRA (France)		GER (Germany)		FLA (Flanders)		SWE (Sweden)		FIN (Finland)		Points

== EMXOpen ==
A 7-round calendar for the 2022 season was announced on 17 November 2021. EMX Open is for riders competing on 2-stroke and 4-stroke motorcycles up to 450cc.

=== Calendar ===
Round	Date	Grand Prix	Location	Race 1 Winner	Race 2 Winner	Round Winner	Report
1	27 February	Great Britain	Matterley Basin	(Spain) José Butrón	(Austria) Michael Sandner	(Austria) Michael Sandner	
2	10 April	Trentino	Pietramurata	(Italy) Giuseppe Tropepe	(Austria) Michael Sandner	(Italy) Giuseppe Tropepe	
3	24 April	Latvia	Ķegums	(Spain) José Butrón	(Italy) Giuseppe Tropepe	(Spain) José Butrón	
4	8 May	Italy	Maggiora	(Spain) José Butrón	(Italy) Simone Croci	(Italy) Stefano Pezzuto	
5	14 August	Finland	Hyvinkää	(Spain) José Butrón	(Estonia) Gert Krestinov	(Estonia) Gert Krestinov	
6	4 September	Turkey	Afyonkarahisar	(Spain) José Butrón	(Austria) Michael Sandner	(Spain) José Butrón	

=== Entry list ===
Team	Constructor	No	Rider	Rounds
Team Borz MX	Honda	3	(Italy) Luca Borz	2, 4
Osička MX Team	KTM	4	(Slovakia) Tomáš Kohút	All
Osička MX Team	KTM	53	(Slovakia) Šimon Jošt	All
Osička MX Team	KTM	377	(Czech Republic) Martin Krč	1–3
Silve Racing	KTM	6	(Finland) Teemu Makkonen	5
Silve Racing	KTM	142	(Finland) Jere Haavisto	3
	KTM	7	(Croatia) Marko Tumbri	2
A. Rannikko MX Racing Team	KTM	9	(Finland) Rene Rannikko	5
Mňuk Racing Team	Yamaha	10	(Czech Republic) Roman Mňuk	2
Chambers Racing	Husqvarna	16	(United Kingdom) Tom Grimshaw	1–2
Chambers Racing	Husqvarna	20	(United Kingdom) Ben Putnam	1
Chambers Racing	Husqvarna	337	(United Kingdom) Glenn McCormick	2
JD Gunnex KTM Racing Team	KTM	17	(Spain) José Butrón	All
JD Gunnex KTM Racing Team	KTM	831	(Poland) Tomasz Wysocki	3
MBP Motocross Team	Gas Gas	18	(Lithuania) Domantas Jazdauskas	5
	Suzuki	19	(Germany) Thomas Stieler	6
EastMX Gas Gas	Gas Gas	21	(Finland) Emil Silander	5
EastMX Gas Gas	Gas Gas	29	(Finland) Pekka Nissinen	3, 5
Apico Husqvarna	Husqvarna	25	(United Kingdom) Jamie Law	1
Apico Husqvarna	Husqvarna	433	(United Kingdom) Jack Lindsay	1
De Jong Racing Team Andre Motors KTM	KTM	30	(Netherlands) Rene de Jong	1–2
	Honda	31	(Croatia) Luka Crnković	2
Team Pol Motors	Gas Gas	34	(Netherlands) Micha Boy de Waal	1
3MX Team	Gas Gas	35	(Italy) Alessandro Lentini	2
Star Racing	KTM	36	(Turkey) Ömer Uçum	6
Star Racing	Yamaha	999	(Turkey) Mustafa Çetin	6
Team Motoextreme Honda	Honda	37	(Estonia) Gert Krestinov	2–3, 5
Revo Seven Kawasaki	Kawasaki	40	(United Kingdom) Jamie Wainwright	
Team Kahro Husqvarna Freetime	Husqvarna	41	(Estonia) Erki Kahro	3, 5
Kros Team Lunardi Racing	Honda	43	(Italy) Davide De Bortoli	1–2, 4
	Husqvarna	44	(Estonia) Tanel Rauk	3
T.A.L.K Templant Racing Team	KTM	46	(United Kingdom) Koby Newbould	1
	Kawasaki	47	(Netherlands) Bram van den Hoek	2
	KTM	51	(Bulgaria) Kristian Petkov	1, 6
Diana MX Team	Husqvarna	56	(Italy) Lorenzo Corti	2, 4
Diana MX Team	Husqvarna	63	(Italy) Giacomo Zancarini	2, 4
Team Ando PBM Honda	Honda	60	(United Kingdom) Brad Anderson	1–2, 4
	Husqvarna	61	(Netherlands) Lars Looman	
	Husqvarna	62	(Estonia) Andero Lusbo	5
ATG JHMX Gas Gas	Gas Gas	64	(Netherlands) Rutger Baauw	1
ATG JHMX Gas Gas	Gas Gas	94	(Netherlands) Sven van der Mierden	1–2
	Husqvarna	65	(Finland) Juuso Matikainen	5
Team AB Racing by Zweiradsport Schmitz	Husqvarna	66	(Germany) Tim Koch	1, 3
KTM Kosak Team	KTM	70	(Germany) Valentin Kees	2
KTM Kosak Team	KTM	859	(Germany) Vincent Peter	2–3
MBP MX Team	KTM	77	(Lithuania) Nojus Gasiūnas	1–3
	KTM	81	(Switzerland) Pablo Zablonier	1
Blades Bikes Race Team	Kawasaki	82	(United Kingdom) Charlie Cole	1
	Yamaha	86	(Turkey) Tuğrul Dursunkaya	6
P&P Racing	Gas Gas	88	(Czech Republic) Dušan Drdaj	2–3
KTM Motofavorīts MX Team	KTM	91	(Latvia) Rauls Blūmfelds	3
Cab Screens Crescent Yamaha	Yamaha	95	(United Kingdom) Daniel Thornhill	1
Arena Racing Team	Kawasaki	96	(Turkey) Eray Esentürk	6
AIT Racing Team	Husqvarna	97	(Bulgaria) Maykal Ivanov	All
HRW Racing Wulfsport Yamaha	Yamaha	99	(United Kingdom) Howard Wainwright	1
SS100 Motosport	KTM	100	(Turkey) Şakir Şenkalayci	6
SS100 Motosport	KTM	101	(Turkey) Batuhan Demiryol	6
SS100 Motosport	KTM	111	(Turkey) Emircan Şenkalayci	6
KTM Scandinavia/CEC Racing	KTM	107	(Sweden) Emil Jönrup	5
	KTM	113	(Italy) Nicolò Turaglio	2
JWR Honda Racing	Honda	114	(Sweden) Max Erlandsson	5
JWR Honda Racing	Honda	351	(Sweden) Jeff Oxelmark	1–3
JWR Honda Racing	Honda	474	(Netherlands) Twan van Essen	2–6
Van der Velden Motoren	KTM	118	(Netherlands) Joël van Mechelen	1
Van der Vegt Motors	Kawasaki	121	(Netherlands) Mitchel van den Essenburg	1
Gabriel KTM MX Team	KTM	134	(United Kingdom) Liam Knight	1
Kartepe	KTM	141	(Turkey) Mevlüt Kolay	6
Motokeidas	KTM	148	(Finland) Tomi Siro	5
Air Max Racing	Gas Gas	150	(Bulgaria) Stefan Neychev	6
KTM South East Europe	KTM	160	(Greece) Manolis Kritikos	1–2
	KTM	181	(Turkey) Volkan Özgür	6
MX88 Motorsport	KTM	188	(Netherlands) Freek van der Vlist	1–2
GH Motorcycles	Husqvarna	190	(United Kingdom) Luke Benstead	1–2, 4
FZ Motorsport	Gas Gas	200	(Italy) Filippo Zonta	
VIP MX Lounge Racing Team	KTM	201	(Netherlands) Romano Aspers	2
VIP MX Lounge Racing Team	KTM	822	(Netherlands) Mike Bolink	1–2, 4
MS Kluky	Honda	202	(Czech Republic) Jonáš Nedvěd	2
AJP Racing Team	Gas Gas	211	(Zimbabwe) Jayden Boyd Ashwell	1
HTS KTM	KTM	214	(Hungary) Bence Pergel	2, 4
HTS KTM	KTM	521	(Hungary) Bence Szvoboda	1–2
MyTeam Motocross	KTM	220	(Slovenia) Jaka Završan	2
Millionaire Racing Team	Husqvarna	223	(Italy) Giuseppe Tropepe	2–4
Unique Power Motorsport	KTM	225	(Finland) Joni Ahola	5
Raths Motorsports	KTM	244	(Germany) Max Bülow	1–5
Raths Motorsports	KTM	766	(Austria) Michael Sandner	All
Raths Motorsports	KTM	817	(Netherlands) Raf Meuwissen	1–4
ASA United Gas Gas	Gas Gas	249	(United Kingdom) John Adamson	5
F4E Gas Gas Racing Team	Gas Gas	251	(Belgium) Jens Getteman	2–3
Schmicker Racing	KTM	260	(Germany) Nico Koch	1, 3
MX61/Softtech	KTM	261	(Turkey) Murat Başterzi	6
Q Racing Team	Husqvarna	271	(Czech Republic) Stanislav Vašíček	2
Q Racing Team	Husqvarna	437	(Czech Republic) Martin Venhoda	2
KTM Beddini MX2	KTM	275	(Italy) Joakin Furbetta	4
Becker Racing	Husqvarna	278	(Belgium) Thomas Vermijl	1–3
	Gas Gas	300	(Turkey) Yiğitali Selek	6
Herts MX Honda	Honda	301	(United Kingdom) Shaun Southgate	1
Pardi Racing KTM	KTM	311	(Italy) Mirko Dal Bosco	2–4
A Team MX	Honda	313	(Italy) Tommaso Isdraele	4
RFX Whites Transport KTM	KTM	338	(United Kingdom) Benjamin White	1
Sturm STC Racing Team	KTM	347	(Austria) Johannes Klein	1–2, 4
Sturm STC Racing Team	KTM	401	(Austria) Marcel Stauffer	2
MBT Racing Team	Husqvarna	385	(Italy) Sebastian Zenato	4
MBT Racing Team	Husqvarna	838	(Italy) Paolo Ermini	4
JRT MX Team	Honda	393	(Italy) Thomas Martelli	2
Martin Racing Technology	Honda	397	(Italy) Yuri Pasqualini	2, 4
Made Of Gas Gas	Gas Gas	399	(Italy) Pietro Trinchieri	2, 4
Lings MX	Gas Gas	410	(United Kingdom) Declan Whittle	1
Nordica Moto	Husqvarna	411	(Romania) Krisztian Tompa	6
LHR KTM	KTM	419	(United Kingdom) Lewis Hall	1
FF Racing Team	Gas Gas	505	(Sweden) Arvid Lüning	3
507 Moto Team	Honda	507	(Slovenia) Matic Žitnik	2
507 Moto Team	KTM	804	(Slovenia) Luka Kutnar	2
KTM Zauner Racing Team	KTM	531	(Austria) Florian Hellrigl	2, 4
FiveThreeSeven	TM	537	(Netherlands) Damian Wedage	
Team Forsell Motor	Husqvarna	567	(Sweden) Rasmus Moen	3
	Yamaha	611	(Belgium) Pako Destercq	1–4
DMX Motorsport	KTM	622	(Italy) Gianluca Di Marziantonio	1
KTM Racing Estonia Powered by Young Motion	KTM	651	(Estonia) Meico Vettik	3
	Yamaha	702	(Italy) Michele D'Aniello	1
	Gas Gas	717	(Austria) David Schöfbeck	2
MCR Racing Team	Gas Gas	771	(Italy) Simone Croci	1
MCR Racing Team	Husqvarna	771	(Italy) Simone Croci	2–5
JS Products Belgium	Yamaha	833	(Belgium) Ugo Moors	
AL860 Motorsport	KTM	860	(Italy) Andrea La Scala	1, 4
Team RSR	KTM	878	(Italy) Stefano Pezzuto	2, 4
Loukko.com Racing Team	KTM	885	(Finland) Alex Tapio	5
	Honda	898	(Italy) Stefano Sonego	2, 4
	KTM	919	(Turkey) Burak Arli	6
Mecamotor KTM	KTM	938	(Brazil) Rodolfo Bicalho	2, 4

=== Riders Championship ===
Pos	Rider	Bike	GBR (United Kingdom)		TRE		LAT (Latvia)		ITA (Italy)		FIN (Finland)		TUR (Turkey)		Points
1	(Spain) José Butrón	KTM	1	3	5	16	1	4	1	5	1	4	1	3	238
2	(Slovakia) Tomáš Kohút	KTM	10	9	6	3	4	6	5	3	4	2	2	2	211
3	(Austria) Michael Sandner	KTM	3	1	3	1	Ret	3	4	20	6	9	4	1	199
4	(Slovakia) Šimon Jošt	KTM	16	11	7	6	19	15	7	4	10	13	3	4	141
5	(Bulgaria) Maykal Ivanov	Husqvarna	2	2	21	15	6	11	9	7	16	12	10	11	136
6	(Italy) Simone Croci	Gas Gas	15	19											110
6	(Italy) Simone Croci	Husqvarna			10	4	12	10	8	1	13	14			110
7	(Italy) Giuseppe Tropepe	Husqvarna			1	2	11	1	2	Ret					104
8	(Estonia) Gert Krestinov	Honda			33	14	2	Ret			2	1			76
9	(Italy) Stefano Pezzuto	KTM			2	Ret			3	2					64
10	(Netherlands) Raf Meuwissen	KTM	4	4	8	10	Ret	DNS	DNS	DNS					60
11	(Italy) Davide De Bortoli	Honda	5	12	19	Ret			6	6					57
12	(United Kingdom) Brad Anderson	Honda	8	6	13	21			12	12					54
13	(Belgium) Jens Getteman	Gas Gas			9	8	10	9							48
14	(United Kingdom) Tom Grimshaw	Husqvarna	9	5	12	11									47
15	(Netherlands) Sven van der Mierden	Gas Gas	11	8	16	5									44
16	(Finland) Jere Haavisto	KTM					3	2							42
17	(Netherlands) Twan van Essen	Honda			32	23	20	21	27	16	11	11	7	20	41
18	(Finland) Juuso Matikainen	Husqvarna									3	3			40
19	(Czech Republic) Martin Krč	KTM	13	15	Ret	24	15	8							33
20	(Romania) Krisztian Tompa	Husqvarna											5	5	32
21	(Estonia) Meico Vettik	KTM					5	5							32
22	(Germany) Tim Koch	Husqvarna	19	18			8	7							32
23	(Estonia) Andero Lusbo	Husqvarna									5	6			31
24	(Austria) Marcel Stauffer	KTM			4	9									30
25	(Bulgaria) Kristian Petkov	KTM	DNQ	DNQ									6	6	30
26	(Sweden) Jeff Oxelmark	Honda	12	29	18	13	16	16							30
27	(United Kingdom) John Adamson	Gas Gas									9	5			28
28	(United Kingdom) Liam Knight	KTM	7	7											28
29	(Bulgaria) Stefan Neychev	Gas Gas											8	7	27
30	(Finland) Emil Silander	Gas Gas									8	7			27
31	(Finland) Pekka Nissinen	Gas Gas					18	19			12	8			27
32	(Germany) Nico Koch	KTM	18	13			9	17							27
33	(Turkey) Mustafa Çetin	Yamaha											9	8	25
34	(Poland) Tomasz Wysocki	KTM					7	12							23
35	(Czech Republic) Dušan Drdaj	Gas Gas			14	12	14	Ret							23
36	(United Kingdom) Daniel Thornhill	Yamaha	6	14											22
37	(Estonia) Erki Kahro	Husqvarna					23	13			7	Ret			22
38	(Turkey) Batuhan Demiryol	KTM											11	9	22
39	(Austria) Johannes Klein	KTM	17	21	17	17			11	Ret					22
40	(Turkey) Ömer Uçum	KTM											14	10	18
41	(Turkey) Şakir Şenkalayci	KTM											12	12	18
42	(Italy) Yuri Pasqualini	Honda			15	18			14	19					18
43	(Hungary) Bence Pergel	KTM			23	7			18	Ret					17
44	(Italy) Luca Borz	Honda			11	28			16	Ret					15
45	(Sweden) Arvid Lüning	Gas Gas					13	14							15
46	(Germany) Thomas Stieler	Suzuki											15	13	14
47	(Italy) Andrea La Scala	KTM	Ret	Ret					Ret	8					13
48	(Italy) Lorenzo Corti	Husqvarna			31	26			20	9					13
49	(Turkey) Eray Esentürk	Kawasaki											13	16	13
50	(Finland) Rene Rannikko	KTM									14	15			13
51	(Sweden) Emil Jönrup	KTM									Ret	10			11
52	(Italy) Tommaso Isdraele	Honda							23	10					11
53	(Italy) Joakin Furbetta	KTM							10	Ret					11
54	(Netherlands) Micha Boy de Waal	Gas Gas	Ret	10											11
55	(Italy) Stefano Sonego	Honda			DNQ	DNQ			24	11					10
56	(Italy) Sebastian Zenato	Husqvarna							21	13					8
57	(Italy) Pietro Trinchieri	Gas Gas			27	34			13	Ret					8
58	(Turkey) Mevlüt Kolay	KTM											20	14	8
59	(Turkey) Volkan Özgür	KTM											19	15	8
60	(Finland) Teemu Makkonen	KTM									18	16			8
61	(Sweden) Max Erlandsson	Honda									17	17			8
62	(Netherlands) Mike Bolink	KTM	21	32	35	31			26	14					7
63	(United Kingdom) Charlie Cole	Kawasaki	14	22											7
64	(Finland) Alex Tapio	KTM									15	20			7
65	(Turkey) Emircan Şenkalayci	KTM											16	19	7
66	(Netherlands) Rene de Jong	KTM	Ret	16	20	20									7
67	(Belgium) Thomas Vermijl	Husqvarna	27	27	25	30	17	18							7
68	(Turkey) Burak Arli	KTM											17	18	7
69	(Austria) Florian Hellrigl	KTM			24	22			15	Ret					6
70	(Italy) Paolo Ermini	Husqvarna							28	15					6
71	(Netherlands) Freek van der Vlist	KTM	20	17	28	25									5
72	(Germany) Max Bülow	KTM	31	30	DNQ	DNQ	25	23	29	DNS	19	18			5
73	(Turkey) Yiğitali Selek	Gas Gas											22	17	4
74	(Italy) Giacomo Zancarini	Husqvarna			36	36			17	Ret					4
75	(Brazil) Rodolfo Bicalho	KTM			34	35			Ret	17					4
76	(Turkey) Murat Başterzi	KTM											18	21	3
77	(Italy) Mirko Dal Bosco	KTM			DNQ	DNQ	29	27	25	18					3
78	(Belgium) Pako Destercq	Yamaha	25	23	DNQ	DNQ	21	20	19	Ret					3
79	(Finland) Joni Ahola	KTM									20	19			3
80	(Italy) Alessandro Lentini	Gas Gas			26	19									2
81	(United Kingdom) Howard Wainwright	Yamaha	26	20											1
	(Turkey) Tuğrul Dursunkaya	Yamaha											21	22	0
	(United Kingdom) Luke Benstead	Husqvarna	23	Ret	DNQ	DNQ			22	Ret					0
	(Lithuania) Nojus Gasiūnas	KTM	DNQ	DNQ	DNQ	DNQ	24	22							0
	(United Kingdom) Jamie Law	Husqvarna	22	25											0
	(Sweden) Rasmus Moen	Husqvarna					22	26							0
	(Czech Republic) Roman Mňuk	Yamaha			22	Ret									0
	(United Kingdom) Ben Putnam	Husqvarna	24	24											0
	(Latvia) Rauls Blūmfelds	KTM					27	24							0
	(Germany) Vincent Peter	KTM			DNQ	DNQ	26	25							0
	(Zimbabwe) Jayden Boyd Ashwell	Gas Gas	29	26											0
	(Czech Republic) Martin Venhoda	Husqvarna			Ret	27									0
	(United Kingdom) Shaun Southgate	Honda	28	28											0
	(Estonia) Tanel Rauk	Husqvarna					28	28							0
	(United Kingdom) Glenn McCormick	Husqvarna			29	33									0
	(Slovenia) Luka Kutnar	KTM			Ret	29									0
	(Croatia) Luka Crnković	Honda			30	32									0
	(United Kingdom) Declan Whittle	Gas Gas	30	33											0
	(Italy) Michele D'Aniello	Yamaha	33	31											0
	(Italy) Gianluca Di Marziantonio	KTM	32	34											0
	(United Kingdom) Jack Lindsay	Husqvarna	34	Ret											0
	(Hungary) Bence Szvoboda	KTM	DNS	DNS	Ret	Ret									0
	(Greece) Manolis Kritikos	KTM	Ret	DNS	DNQ	DNQ									0
	(Netherlands) Mitchel van den Essenburg	Kawasaki	Ret	DNS											0
	(Netherlands) Joël van Mechelen	KTM	Ret	DNS											0
	(Lithuania) Domantas Jazdauskas	Gas Gas									Ret	DNS			0
	(Finland) Tomi Siro	KTM									Ret	DNS			0
	(Switzerland) Pablo Zablonier	KTM	DNQ	DNQ											0
	(United Kingdom) Koby Newbould	KTM	DNQ	DNQ											0
	(United Kingdom) Benjamin White	KTM	DNQ	DNQ											0
	(Netherlands) Rutger Baauw	Gas Gas	DNQ	DNQ											0
	(United Kingdom) Lewis Hall	KTM	DNQ	DNQ											0
	(Italy) Thomas Martelli	Honda			DNQ	DNQ									0
	(Netherlands) Romano Aspers	KTM			DNQ	DNQ									0
	(Netherlands) Bram van den Hoek	Kawasaki			DNQ	DNQ									0
	(Croatia) Marko Tumbri	KTM			DNQ	DNQ									0
	(Italy) Nicolò Turaglio	KTM			DNQ	DNQ									0
	(Germany) Valentin Kees	KTM			DNQ	DNQ									0
	(Czech Republic) Jonáš Nedvěd	Honda			DNQ	DNQ									0
	(Czech Republic) Stanislav Vašíček	Husqvarna			DNQ	DNQ									0
	(Slovenia) Jaka Završan	KTM			DNQ	DNQ									0
	(Austria) David Schöfbeck	Gas Gas			DNQ	DNQ									0
	(Slovenia) Matic Žitnik	Honda			DNQ	DNQ									0
Pos	Rider	Bike	GBR (United Kingdom)		TRE		LAT (Latvia)		ITA (Italy)		FIN (Finland)		TUR (Turkey)		Points

=== Manufacturers Championship ===
Pos	Bike	GBR (United Kingdom)		TRE		LAT (Latvia)		ITA (Italy)		FIN (Finland)		TUR (Turkey)		Points
1	KTM	1	1	2	1	1	2	1	2	1	2	1	1	288
2	Husqvarna	2	2	1	2	6	1	2	1	3	3	5	5	250
3	Honda	5	6	11	13	2	16	6	6	2	1	7	20	168
4	Gas Gas	11	8	9	5	10	9	13	Ret	8	5	8	7	138
5	Yamaha	6	14	22	Ret	21	20	19	Ret			9	8	50
6	Kawasaki	14	22	DNQ	DNQ							13	16	20
7	Suzuki											15	13	14
Pos	Bike	GBR (United Kingdom)		TRE		LAT (Latvia)		ITA (Italy)		FIN (Finland)		TUR (Turkey)		Points

== EMX2T ==
A 1-round calendar for the 2022 season was announced on 17 November 2021. EMX2T is for riders competing on 2-stroke motorcycles of 250cc.

=== Calendar ===
Round	Date	Grand Prix	Location	Race 1 Winner	Race 2 Winner	Round Winner	Report
1	17 July	Czech Republic	Loket	(Latvia) Toms Macuks	(Norway) Håkon Østerhagen	(Latvia) Toms Macuks	

=== Entry list ===
Team	Constructor	No	Rider
HT Group Racing Team	KTM	19	(Czech Republic) Jiři Matějec
Filten Racing	Yamaha	21	(Denmark) Mathias Jørgensen
Motorex Husqvarna Schweiz	Husqvarna	25	(Portugal) Alexandre Marques
Pardi Racing Team	KTM	28	(Italy) Alessandro Sadovschi
Pardi Racing Team	KTM	116	(Italy) Jimmy de Nicola
Motorrad Waldmann	Yamaha	37	(Germany) Carl Massury
Becker Racing	KTM	55	(Germany) Patrik Bender
M.B.T Motorbike Racing Team	Husqvarna	71	(Italy) Morgan Bennati
M.B.T Motorbike Racing Team	Husqvarna	385	(Italy) Sebastian Zenato
M.B.T Motorbike Racing Team	Husqvarna	838	(Italy) Paolo Ermini
JK Racing Yamaha	Yamaha	79	(Italy) Nicola Salvini
JK Racing Yamaha	Yamaha	371	(Italy) Manuel Iacopi
	KTM	84	(Austria) Markus Windhaber
Rodeo Racing MX Team	KTM	92	(Latvia) Toms Macuks
Kamikaze Racing Team	Yamaha	95	(Czech Republic) Pavel Doubek
Orion Racing Team	KTM	111	(Czech Republic) Petr Bartoš
KTM Sarholz Racing Team	KTM	113	(Germany) Robin Lang
	KTM	119	(Netherlands) Jonny Karst
	Husqvarna	158	(Germany) Kevin Geyer
Schmitz Racing	Husqvarna	197	(Germany) Thomas Haas
Apico Husqvarna	Husqvarna	256	(United Kingdom) Jamie Law
	KTM	259	(France) Wayne Suire
Fantic Factory Team Maddii	Fantic	312	(Norway) Håkon Østerhagen
KTM Dach/HSV Ried	KTM	319	(Austria) Christoph Zeintl
Sturm STC Racing Team	KTM	347	(Austria) Johannes Klein
JWR Honda Racing	Gas Gas	351	(Sweden) Jeff Oxelmark
JTX Racing	KTM	365	(Denmark) Nikolaj Skovgaard
Jump Racing Team	Husqvarna	373	(Italy) Alessio Bonetta
Next Level Profesional Motocross Team	Yamaha	456	(Norway) Mathias Kjørstad
	KTM	509	(Belgium) Yoran Moens
KTM Zauner Racing Team	KTM	531	(Austria) Florian Hellrigl
Grizzly Racing Service	TM	537	(Netherlands) Damian Wedage
KTM Racing Estonia Powered by Young Motion	KTM	651	(Estonia) Meico Vettik
	Beta	792	(Italy) Devid Tozzi
	Suzuki	810	(Germany) Kai Haase
	Yamaha	879	(France) Edgard Moncel
KTM Kosak Team	Fantic	881	(Germany) Cedric Schick
FUS Marsh MX Husqvarna	Husqvarna	957	(United Kingdom) Jake Preston

=== Riders Championship ===
Pos	Rider	Motorcycle	CZE (Czech Republic)		Points
1	(Latvia) Toms Macuks	KTM	1	2	47
2	(Norway) Håkon Østerhagen	Fantic	6	1	40
3	(Austria) Johannes Klein	KTM	3	5	36
4	(Denmark) Mathias Jørgensen	Yamaha	4	6	33
5	(Austria) Florian Hellrigl	KTM	9	3	32
6	(Czech Republic) Jiři Matějec	KTM	7	4	32
7	(Italy) Manuel Iacopi	Yamaha	5	9	28
8	(Italy) Paolo Ermini	Husqvarna	8	8	26
9	(Italy) Morgan Bennati	Husqvarna	11	7	24
10	(Estonia) Meico Vettik	KTM	2	DSQ	22
11	(United Kingdom) Jamie Law	Husqvarna	12	11	19
12	(Portugal) Alexandre Marques	Husqvarna	10	13	19
13	(Denmark) Nikolaj Skovgaard	KTM	15	10	17
14	(Germany) Kai Haase	Suzuki	13	15	14
15	(Italy) Jimmy de Nicola	KTM	17	14	11
16	(Germany) Robin Lang	KTM	14	17	11
17	(Sweden) Jeff Oxelmark	Gas Gas	Ret	12	9
18	(Netherlands) Damian Wedage	TM	19	16	7
19	(Italy) Sebastian Zenato	Husqvarna	16	20	6
20	(Norway) Mathias Kjørstad	Yamaha	20	18	4
21	(Czech Republic) Petr Bartoš	KTM	18	22	3
22	(Italy) Nicola Salvini	Yamaha	24	19	2
	(United Kingdom) Jake Preston	Husqvarna	22	21	0
	(Italy) Alessandro Sadovschi	KTM	21	23	0
	(Italy) Alessio Bonetta	Husqvarna	23	27	0
	(Belgium) Yoran Moens	KTM	27	24	0
	(Germany) Patrik Bender	KTM	25	32	0
	(Italy) Devid Tozzi	Beta	Ret	25	0
	(Germany) Thomas Haas	Husqvarna	26	31	0
	(Germany) Carl Massury	Yamaha	Ret	26	0
	(Austria) Markus Windhaber	KTM	28	28	0
	(Netherlands) Jonny Karst	KTM	29	29	0
	(Germany) Cedric Schick	Fantic	30	30	0
	(France) Edgard Moncel	Yamaha	31	Ret	0
	(Germany) Kevin Geyer	Husqvarna	32	34	0
	(France) Wayne Suire	KTM	Ret	33	0
	(Austria) Christoph Zeintl	KTM	Ret	DNS	0
	(Czech Republic) Pavel Doubek	Yamaha	Ret	DNS	0
Pos	Rider	Motorcycle	CZE (Czech Republic)		Points

=== Manufacturers Championship ===
Pos	Bike	CZE (Czech Republic)		Points
1	KTM	1	2	47
2	Fantic	6	1	40
3	Yamaha	4	6	33
4	Husqvarna	8	7	27
5	Suzuki	13	15	14
6	Gas Gas	Ret	12	9
7	TM	19	16	7
	Beta	Ret	25	0
Pos	Bike	CZE (Czech Republic)		Points

== EMX85 ==
A 1-round calendar for the 2022 season was announced on 17 November 2021. EMX85 is for riders competing on 2-stroke motorcycles of 85cc.

=== Calendar ===
Round	Date	Grand Prix	Location	Race 1 Winner	Race 2 Winner	Round Winner	Report
1	17 July	Czech Republic	Loket	(Netherlands) Gyan Doensen	(Czech Republic) Vítězslav Marek	(Czech Republic) Vítězslav Marek	

=== Participants ===
Riders qualify for the championship by finishing in the top 10 in one of the 4 regional 85cc championships.

No	Rider	Motorcycle
8	(Bulgaria) Vencislav Toshev	Husqvarna
17	(Hungary) Áron Katona	KTM
77	(Romania) Tudor Stefanescu	KTM
96	(Bulgaria) Dani Tsankov	Yamaha
202	(Switzerland) Ryan Oppliger	KTM
211	(Italy) Riccardo Pini	KTM
221	(Italy) Filippo Mantovani	Gas Gas
228	(Italy) Gennaro Utech	Gas Gas
249	(Croatia) Šimun Ivandić	Gas Gas
256	(France) Basile Pigois	Gas Gas
259	(France) Felix Cardineau	Husqvarna
295	(France) Mano Faure	KTM
298	(Italy) Nicoló Alvisi	Gas Gas
301	(France) Liam Bruneau	KTM
310	(France) Amaury Maindru	KTM
317	(Italy) Niccolò Mannini	KTM
329	(Austria) Moritz Ernecker	Husqvarna
333	(Spain) Ot Marí Ruíz	KTM
352	(Slovenia) Miha Vrh	Husqvarna
383	(Spain) Enzo Badenas Tejada	Husqvarna
403	(Germany) Martin Kettlitz	Husqvarna
411	(Netherlands) Dex van den Broek	KTM
417	(Netherlands) Jayson van Drunen	Yamaha
418	(Czech Republic) Martin Cervenka	KTM
424	(Netherlands) Dean Gregoire	KTM
454	(Sweden) Erik Frisagård	KTM
472	(United Kingdom) Max Harris	KTM
474	(Belgium) Ian Ampoorter	KTM
479	(Czech Republic) Vítězslav Marek	KTM
484	(Netherlands) Dex Kooiker	Husqvarna
494	(Czech Republic) David Widerwill	KTM
503	(Belgium) Jarne Bervoets	KTM
505	(Sweden) Casper Lindmark	KTM
518	(Belgium) Douwe Van Mechgelen	Husqvarna
529	(Belgium) Maxime Lucas	KTM
574	(Netherlands) Gyan Doensen	Husqvarna
577	(Finland) Viktor Leppälä	KTM
589	(Belgium) Tyla Van de Poel	KTM
592	(Sweden) Freddie Bartlett	KTM
601	(Latvia) Emīls Solovjevs	Husqvarna
623	(Lithuania) Eimantas Čepulis	KTM
637	(Estonia) Jan-Marten Paju	Husqvarna
717	(Estonia) Kaspar Uibu	Yamaha
719	(Latvia) Raivo Laicāns	Husqvarna
729	(Poland) Michał Psiuk	KTM
732	(Estonia) Tristen Mardo	Husqvarna
740	(Estonia) Travis Leok	Husqvarna
751	(Poland) Dawid Zaremba	KTM
789	(Ukraine) Ostap Andrukh	KTM
793	(Estonia) Gregor Kuusk	Husqvarna

=== Riders Championship ===
Pos	Rider	Motorcycle	CZE (Czech Republic)		Points
1	(Czech Republic) Vítězslav Marek	KTM	2	1	47
2	(Netherlands) Gyan Doensen	Husqvarna	1	2	47
3	(Italy) Filippo Mantovani	Gas Gas	3	3	40
4	(Sweden) Freddie Bartlett	KTM	7	4	32
5	(France) Amaury Maindru	KTM	6	8	28
6	(France) Mano Faure	KTM	5	9	28
7	(Belgium) Ian Ampoorter	KTM	13	7	22
8	(Belgium) Jarne Bervoets	KTM	11	12	19
9	(France) Felix Cardineau	Husqvarna	4	Ret	18
10	(Italy) Niccolò Mannini	KTM	21	5	16
11	(Netherlands) Dex Kooiker	Husqvarna	16	10	16
12	(Italy) Gennaro Utech	Gas Gas	12	14	16
13	(Belgium) Douwe Van Mechgelen	Husqvarna	28	6	15
14	(Estonia) Gregor Kuusk	Husqvarna	17	11	14
15	(Hungary) Áron Katona	KTM	8	26	13
16	(Estonia) Tristen Mardo	Husqvarna	10	20	12
17	(Slovenia) Miha Vrh	Husqvarna	9	27	12
18	(Switzerland) Ryan Oppliger	KTM	14	18	10
19	(France) Basile Pigois	Gas Gas	24	13	8
20	(Italy) Nicolò Alvisi	Gas Gas	15	19	8
21	(Finland) Viktor Leppälä	KTM	36	15	6
22	(France) Liam Bruneau	KTM	22	16	5
23	(Czech Republic) Martin Červenka	KTM	25	17	4
24	(Belgium) Maxime Lucas	KTM	18	Ret	3
25	(Czech Republic) David Widerwill	KTM	19	30	2
26	(Latvia) Emīls Solovjevs	Husqvarna	20	29	1
	(Italy) Riccardo Pini	KTM	26	21	0
	(Sweden) Casper Lindmark	KTM	29	22	0
	(Spain) Enzo Badenas	Husqvarna	23	24	0
	(Croatia) Šimun Ivandić	Gas Gas	30	23	0
	(Spain) Ot Marí	KTM	32	25	0
	(Estonia) Travis Leok	Husqvarna	27	36	0
	(Bulgaria) Dani Tsankov	Yamaha	33	28	0
	(Netherlands) Jayson van Drunen	Yamaha	31	Ret	0
	(Lithuania) Eimantas Čepulis	KTM	DNQ	31	0
	(Estonia) Jan-Marten Paju	Husqvarna	35	32	0
	(Sweden) Erik Frisagård	KTM	Ret	33	0
	(Poland) Michał Psiuk	KTM	34	34	0
	(Netherlands) Dex van den Broek	KTM	37	35	0
	(Latvia) Raivo Laicāns	Husqvarna	Ret	DNS	0
	(Poland) Dawid Zaremba	KTM	Ret	DNS	0
	(Austria) Moritz Ernecker	Husqvarna	DNQ	Ret	0
	(Bulgaria) Vencislav Toshev	Husqvarna	DNQ	DNQ	0
	(United Kingdom) Max Harris	KTM	DNQ	DNQ	0
	(Estonia) Kaspar Uibu	Yamaha	DNQ	DNQ	0
	(Germany) Martin Kettlitz	Husqvarna	DNQ	DNQ	0
	(Ukraine) Ostap Andrukh	KTM	DNQ	DNQ	0
	(Romania) Tudor Stefanescu	KTM	DNQ	DNQ	0
	(Belgium) Tyla Van de Poel	KTM	DNQ	DNQ	0
	(Netherlands) Dean Gregoire	KTM	DNQ	DNQ	0
Pos	Rider	Motorcycle	CZE (Czech Republic)		Points

== EMX65 ==
A 1-round calendar for the 2022 season was announced on 17 November 2021. EMX65 is for riders competing on 2-stroke motorcycles of 65cc.

=== Calendar ===
Round	Date	Grand Prix	Location	Race 1 Winner	Race 2 Winner	Round Winner	Report
1	17 July	Czech Republic	Loket	(Austria) Ricardo Bauer	(Austria) Ricardo Bauer	(Austria) Ricardo Bauer	

=== Participants ===
Riders qualify for the championship by finishing in the top 10 in one of the 4 regional 65cc championships.

No	Rider	Motorcycle
6	(Bulgaria) Alexander Tasev	Yamaha
10	(Turkey) Hasan Hüseyin Baş	KTM
21	(Romania) Sami Alexandru Dumitru	KTM
24	(Bulgaria) Georgi Ginov	Husqvarna
28	(Romania) Mark Szoke Eross	Husqvarna
55	(Hungary) Gergő Horváth	Yamaha
64	(Bulgaria) Simeon Todorov	Yamaha
110	(Romania) Tudor Andrei Balaban	Yamaha
112	(Turkey) Efe Okur	KTM
200	(France) Louis Morette	Husqvarna
201	(Italy) Mattia Giovanelli	Yamaha
210	(Slovenia) Tai Vidović	Husqvarna
224	(Spain) Pau Caudet Ruíz	KTM
227	(Spain) Alonso Parejo	KTM
265	(Italy) Francesco Assini	Gas Gas
282	(France) Enzo Herzogenrath	KTM
298	(Austria) Ricardo Bauer	KTM
300	(South Africa) Trent Valsecchi	KTM
308	(Austria) Elias Felbermair	Husqvarna
315	(France) Rafael Menillo	KTM
385	(Spain) Jorge Salvador	Gas Gas
391	(Spain) Carlos Martín Jiménez	KTM
397	(Slovenia) Alex Novak	KTM
402	(Denmark) Casey Karstrom	Yamaha
404	(Netherlands) Kenzo Jaspers	Husqvarna
418	(Belgium) Torre Van Mechgelen	KTM
427	(Netherlands) Chento van Zoest	KTM
461	(Netherlands) Dion Brakke	Gas Gas
464	(Denmark) Bertram Thorius	Yamaha
480	(Netherlands) Teunis Spijkerman	Gas Gas
510	(Finland) Eeka Laaksonen	Gas Gas
520	(Slovakia) Maxim Zimmerman	Husqvarna
521	(Finland) Mauno Keskikallio	KTM
527	(Czech Republic) Hugo Brant	KTM
551	(Netherlands) Hidde Hutten	Gas Gas
578	(Germany) Neo Nindelt	Yamaha
582	(Germany) Jamiro Peters	KTM
598	(United Kingdom) Harry Dale	KTM
601	(Lithuania) Rojus Zaborskis	KTM
602	(Estonia) Aston Allas	Husqvarna
611	(Estonia) Lucas Leok	Husqvarna
700	(Estonia) Theo Kolts	Gas Gas
720	(Estonia) Leslie Puller	Husqvarna
722	(Latvia) Jēkabs Hudolejs	Yamaha
742	(Estonia) Enri Lustus	Husqvarna
751	(Latvia) Mārtiņš Cīrulis	Husqvarna
757	(Latvia) Toms Dankerts	KTM
771	(Latvia) Patriks Cīrulis	Husqvarna
775	(Estonia) Marten Raud	Husqvarna
783	(Latvia) Artūrs Vinters	KTM

=== Riders Championship ===
Pos	Rider	Motorcycle	CZE (Czech Republic)		Points
1	(Austria) Ricardo Bauer	KTM	1	1	50
2	(Spain) Pau Caudet	KTM	4	3	38
3	(Spain) Jorge Salvador	Gas Gas	3	5	36
4	(Estonia) Lucas Leok	Husqvarna	10	2	33
5	(Slovenia) Alex Novak	KTM	2	11	32
6	(Denmark) Bertram Thorius	Yamaha	8	4	31
7	(Latvia) Jēkabs Hudolejs	Yamaha	5	7	30
8	(France) Louis Morette	Husqvarna	6	8	28
9	(Spain) Carlos Martín	KTM	9	9	24
10	(Italy) Francesco Assini	Gas Gas	7	13	22
11	(France) Rafael Menillo	KTM	21	6	15
12	(Estonia) Leslie Puller	Husqvarna	12	16	14
13	(Finland) Eeka Laaksonen	Gas Gas	17	12	13
14	(Spain) Alonso Parejo	KTM	24	10	11
15	(Bulgaria) Georgi Ginov	Husqvarna	11	36	10
16	(United Kingdom) Harry Dale	KTM	18	15	9
17	(Netherlands) Teunis Spijkerman	Gas Gas	13	22	8
18	(Estonia) Aston Allas	KTM	26	14	7
19	(South Africa) Trent Valsecchi	KTM	14	26	7
20	(Slovenia) Tai Vidović	Husqvarna	15	31	6
21	(Estonia) Enri Lustus	Husqvarna	16	24	5
22	(Latvia) Toms Dankerts	KTM	30	17	4
23	(Netherlands) Kenzo Jaspers	Husqvarna	27	18	3
24	(Germany) Neo Nindelt	Yamaha	19	20	3
25	(France) Enzo Herzogenrath	KTM	29	19	2
26	(Denmark) Casey Karstrom	Yamaha	20	33	1
	(Slovakia) Maxim Zimmerman	Husqvarna	38	21	0
	(Lithuania) Rojus Zaborskis	KTM	22	23	0
	(Romania) Sami Alexandru Dumitru	KTM	23	27	0
	(Estonia) Marten Raud	Husqvarna	32	25	0
	(Belgium) Torre Van Mechgelen	KTM	25	34	0
	(Latvia) Patriks Cīrulis	Husqvarna	28	29	0
	(Latvia) Artūrs Vinters	KTM	36	28	0
	(Netherlands) Dion Brakke	Gas Gas	DNQ	30	0
	(Estonia) Theo Kolts	Gas Gas	31	38	0
	(Hungary) Gergő Horváth	Yamaha	34	32	0
	(Latvia) Mārtiņš Cīrulis	Husqvarna	33	35	0
	(Austria) Elias Felbermair	Husqvarna	35	39	0
	(Germany) Jamiro Peters	KTM	37	37	0
	(Finland) Mauno Keskikallio	KTM	DNQ	40	0
	(Czech Republic) Hugo Brant	KTM	Ret	DNS	0
	(Romania) Mark Szoke Eross	Husqvarna	Ret	DNS	0
	(Netherlands) Hidde Hutten	Gas Gas	DNQ	DNQ	0
	(Italy) Mattia Giovanelli	Yamaha	DNQ	DNQ	0
	(Netherlands) Chento van Zoest	KTM	DNQ	DNQ	0
	(Turkey) Efe Okur	KTM	DNQ	DNQ	0
	(Bulgaria) Simeon Todorov	Yamaha	DNQ	DNQ	0
	(Romania) Tudor Andrei Balaban	Yamaha	DNQ	DNQ	0
	(Turkey) Hasan Hüseyin Baş	KTM	DNQ	DNQ	0
	(Bulgaria) Alexander Tasev	Yamaha	DNQ	DNQ	0
Pos	Rider	Motorcycle	CZE (Czech Republic)		Points
