= Giuseppe Mortarotti =

Italian footballer

Personal information
- Date of birth: 28 October 1905
- Place of birth: Valduggia, Kingdom of Italy
- Date of death: 18 July 1973 (aged 67)
- Position: Defender

Senior career*
Years	Team	Apps	(Gls)
1922–1923	Pastore Torino	1	(0)
1923–1925	Chivasso		
1925–1927	Chieri		
1927–1930	Juventus	6	(0)
1930–1931	Atalanta	3	(0)
1931–1932	Montevarchi		
1932–1934	Cosenza	28	(3)
- * Club domestic league appearances and goals

Giuseppe Mortarotti (28 October 1905 – 18 July 1973) was an Italian professional football player.
