= Pogno =

- Comune
- Comune di Pogno
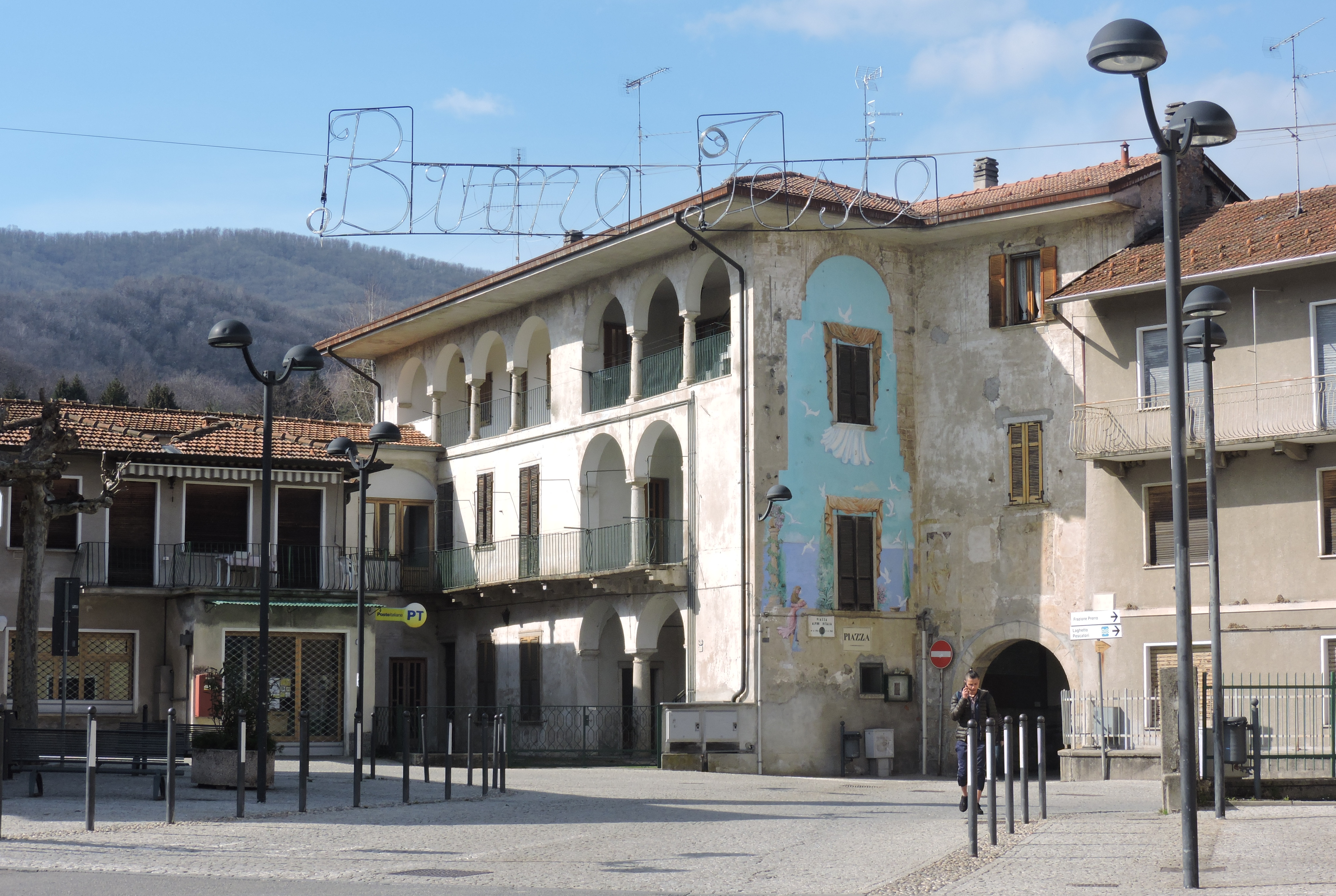
- View of Pogno

- Location within Italy Location within Piedmont
- Coordinates: 45°45′N 8°26′E
- Country: Italy
- Region: Piedmont
- Province: Novara (NO)

Government
  - Mayor: Maria Eliana Paracchini

Area
  - Total: 10.1 km^{2} (3.9 sq mi)
- Elevation: 420 m (1,380 ft)

Population (Dec. 2004)
  - Total: 1,556
  - Density: 154/km^{2} (399/sq mi)
- Demonym: Pognesi
- Time zone: UTC+1 (CET)
  - Summer (DST): UTC+2 (CEST)
- Postal code: 28076
- Dialing code: 0322
- Website: Official website

Pogno is a comune (municipality) in the Province of Novara in the Italian region Piedmont, located about 100 kilometres (62 mi) northeast of Turin and about 35 kilometres (22 mi) northwest of Novara.

Pogno borders the following municipalities: Gozzano, Madonna del Sasso, San Maurizio d'Opaglio, Soriso, and Valduggia.
