= Gargallo, Piedmont =

Municipality in Piedmont, Italy

Gargallo
- Comune
- Comune di Gargallo
- Parish church, Gargallo

- Location within Italy Location within Piedmont
- Coordinates: 45°44′N 8°26′E
- Country: Italy
- Region: Piedmont
- Province: Novara (NO)
- Frazioni: Motto, Valletta

Government
  - Mayor: Luigi Giulio Guidetti

Area
  - Total: 3.7 km^{2} (1.4 sq mi)
- Elevation: 396 m (1,299 ft)

Population (Dec. 2004)
  - Total: 1,730
  - Density: 470/km^{2} (1,200/sq mi)
- Demonym: Gargallesi
- Time zone: UTC+1 (CET)
  - Summer (DST): UTC+2 (CEST)
- Postal code: 28010
- Dialing code: 0322
- Website: Official website

Gargallo is a comune (municipality) in the Province of Novara in the Italian region Piedmont, located about 90 kilometres (56 mi) northeast of Turin and about 35 kilometres (22 mi) northwest of Novara.

Gargallo borders the following municipalities: Borgomanero, Gozzano, Maggiora, Soriso, and Valduggia.
