= Valduggia =

- Comune
- Comune di Valduggia
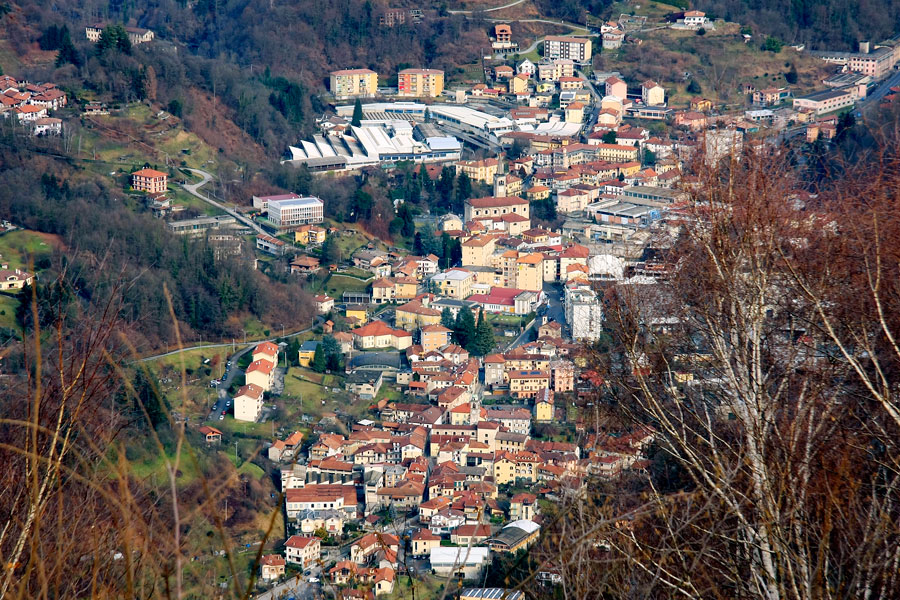

- Location within Italy Location within Piedmont
- Coordinates: 45°44′N 8°20′E
- Country: Italy
- Region: Piedmont
- Province: Vercelli (VC)
- Frazioni: Arva, Arlezze, Bertagnina, Campiano, Cantone, Castagnola, Cereto, Cerianelli, Colma di Valduggia, Crabbia, Fronto, Lebbia, Maretti, Molino Medana, Molino Rastelli, Oraldo, Orbruncio, Orcarale, Orlonghetto, Orlungo, Orsanvenzo, Pellicione, Ponte Sales, Rasco, Raschetto, Rastiglione, Romagnasco, San Bernardo, Sella, Seula, Soliva, Sorzano, Strona, Valpiana, Zuccaro

Government
  - Mayor: Pier Luigi Prino

Area
  - Total: 28.7 km^{2} (11.1 sq mi)
- Elevation: 392 m (1,286 ft)

Population (31 December 2015)
  - Total: 2,056
  - Density: 71.6/km^{2} (186/sq mi)
- Demonym: Valduggesi
- Time zone: UTC+1 (CET)
  - Summer (DST): UTC+2 (CEST)
- Postal code: 13018
- Dialing code: 0163
- Website: Official website

Valduggia is a comune (municipality) in the Province of Vercelli in the Italian region Piedmont, located about 90 kilometres (56 mi) northeast of Turin and about 45 kilometres (28 mi) north of Vercelli.

Valduggia borders the following municipalities: Boca, Borgosesia, Cellio con Breia, Gargallo, Grignasco, Madonna del Sasso, Maggiora, Pogno, and Soriso.

Parish church

== Notable people ==
- Gaudenzio Ferrari (about 1471–1546), painter
- Giovanni Battista Falda (1643–1678), printmaker
- Giuseppe Mazzola (1748–1838), painter
- Giuseppe Mortarotti (born 1903), football player
