= Giovanni Battista Falda =

Italian painter (1643–1678)

- Veduta of St. Peter's Basilica by Giovanni Battista Falda, c. 1669
- Born: 7 December 1643; Valduggia, Duchy of Savoy
- Died: 22 August 1678 (aged 34); Rome, Papal States
- Resting place: Santa Maria della Scala
- Education: Gian Lorenzo Bernini
- Occupations: Architect; Engraver
- Movement: Baroque

Giovanni Battista Falda (7 December 1643 – 22 August 1678) was an Italian architect, engraver, and artist. He is known for his engravings of both contemporary and antique structures of Rome.

== Biography ==
=== Early life and education ===
Giovanni Battista Falda was born in Valduggia, near Vercelli, on 7 December 1643 to Francesco Falda and Caterina Mazzola. From a young age, he showed a great aptitude for art and drawing in particular. Still a boy, he entered the workshop of the Baroque painter Francesco Ferrari.

At the age of 14, Falda was sent to Rome to live with an uncle, who recommended him to Gian Lorenzo Bernini. However, it was his meeting with the publisher Giovanni Giacomo de Rossi, who had a workshop in Piazza Navona, that marked a turning point in Falda's artistic career. Impressed by his draughtsmanship, de Rossi took him on at his workshop and introduced him to emerging artists such as Francesco Borromini and Pietro da Cortona. In De Rossi's workshop, Falda had the opportunity to study the work of renowned engravers such as Jacques Callot, Stefano Della Bella and Israel Silvestre.

=== Mature work ===
Around the age of twenty, after completing his apprenticeship, Falda entered the service of Pope Alexander VII. In 1663, he produced a print depicting major buildings built or restored in Rome during Alexander's papacy. Two years later, in 1665, he published his masterpiece: the plates for the first volume of Nuovo Teatro delle fabbriche et edificii in prospettiva di Roma moderna. The second and third volumes were published between 1665 and 1669.

The first two volumes depict buildings constructed or expanded during Alexander VII's pontificate, while the third volume features churches restored by Pope Clement IX. Prior to Falda, Roman landscape engraving had primarily focused on the ruins of the ancient city. It was not until the completion of the urban renewal and architectural projects of the seventeenth-century popes that collections dedicated to the modern city began to emerge. Falda's engraved views are characterised by their attention to perspective and scenographic effects in keeping with the spatial criteria of Baroque art. The third plate in the first volume of Nuovo Teatro presents the as-yet-unfinished redevelopment project for St. Peter's Square, which originally included a third arm of the portico. Clearly, Falda was held in high regard by Bernini, who allowed him to publicise a project that had not yet been realised.

Falda also produced engravings of public ceremonies, including royal entries into Rome, canonisations, and funerals. Examples include an etching of the canonisation of Francis de Sales, dedicated to Agostino Chigi on 19 April 1665, and a plan of the conclave, which was first engraved in 1676 and reprinted for subsequent conclaves.

=== The 1676 Map of Rome ===
Falda's 1676 map of Rome

The widespread circulation of Falda's 1676 Map of Rome, which depicts the city at the height of the Baroque period, is testament to the success of his prints. Prior to Falda's work, large maps of Rome had been printed by engravers such as Antonio Tempesta and Giovanni Maggi. However, the distinctive feature of Falda's map is its vertical 'bird's eye' perspective. Falda’s map combines a flat, unforeshortened ground plan with parallel architectural elevations. This combination gives viewers the seamless illusion of floating directly above Rome. Unlike earlier panoramic views that compressed the background due to artistic perspective, Falda's hybrid layout ensures that the city's furthest walls and interior courtyards remain just as mathematically clear and detailed as the foreground.

The numerous subsequent editions of the map (in 1697, 1705, 1730 and 1756) were updated periodically and remained a fundamental point of reference in Roman cartography until the city plan edited by Giambattista Nolli in 1748.

=== Later work and legacy ===
Falda's last published work is the collection Li Giardini Di Roma Con le Loro Piante Alzate e Vedute in Prospettiva, which depicts the most famous Roman gardens, including the Farnese, Medici, and Quirinale gardens, in topographical and perspective views. Widely recognised by architectural and landscape historians as the visual pinnacle of Italian garden design, this collection was published posthumously in 1768. Falda died of cancer in Rome on 22 August 1678, aged 35, and was buried in Santa Maria della Scala in Trastevere. Despite the short span of time in which he worked, Falda's work was tireless. By the end of his life, he had engraved approximately three hundred plates, many of which are preserved at the Istituto Nazionale per la Grafica in Rome.

Some of Falda's drawings have also survived; the Kupferstichkabinett in Berlin holds thirty-six preparatory drawings for plates dedicated to fountains and gardens. The Berlin collection also includes a drawing of the church of Sant'Andrea in Via Flaminia. Finally, the Edmond Fatio collection in Geneva houses two of Falda's drawings: an elevation of the Palazzo delle Fontane on the second floor of the Caprarola garden, and a view of a 'square with an obelisk'.

Falda's works enjoyed great success, and were often imitated in Italy and Europe in the following century. His work greatly influenced the subsequent generation of Roman printmakers, from Giovanni Francesco Venturini and Alessandro Specchi to Giuseppe Vasi. A collection of prints by Falda titled Romanorum Fontinalia was published in Nuremberg in 1685. For this publication, engravers such as Hans Ulrich Franck, Susanne Maria von Sandrart and Johannes Mayer reused Falda's copperplates of fountains, adding Flemish characters and details to well-known Roman scenes.

== Gallery ==
View of the Farnese Gardens from Forum Romanum, 1685

View of the Church of Santa Caterina dei Funari, Rome, 1669.

View of San Carlo alle Quattro Fontane, 1669

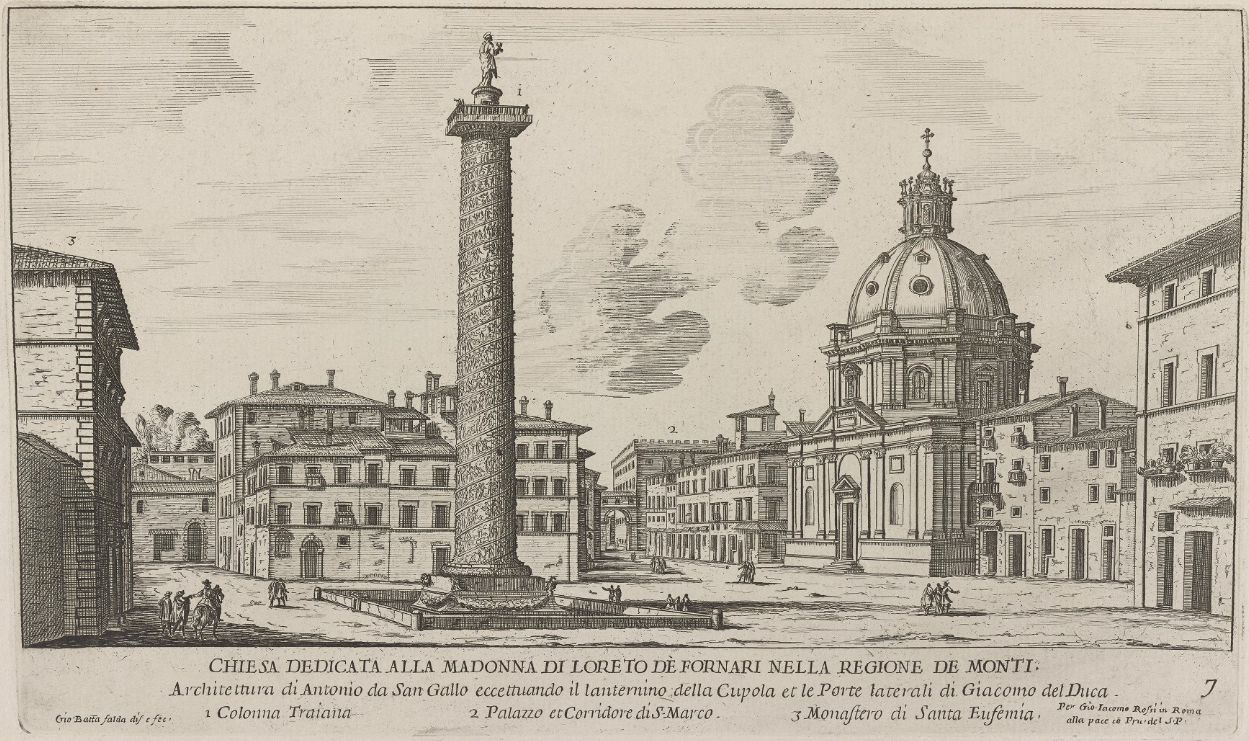
View of the church of Santa Maria di Loreto near Trajan's Market, 1669

Canonization in St. Peter's Basilica, 1677

Fontana del Tritone in Piazza Barberini, 1653

Piazza Santi Apostoli, 1667

Stanza dei Venti in the gardens of the Villa Aldobrandini in Frascati, 1653

== Works ==
- Villa Pamphilia eiusque palatium, cum suis prospectibus, statuae, fontes, vivaria, theatra, areolae, plantarum, viarumque ordines, cum eiusdem villae absoluta delineatione, Rome, de Rossi, 1650.
- I Palazzi di Roma de' più celebri architetti (with Pietro Ferrerio), Rome, de Rossi, 1655–70.
- Il Nuovo Teatro della Fabriche et Edificii, in prospettiva di Roma moderna, 3 vols., Rome, de Rossi, 1665–69.
- Le fontane di Roma nelle piazze e luoghi publici della città, con li loro prospetti, come sono al presente (completed by Giovanni Francesco Venturini), Rome, de Rossi, 1675–91.
- Nuova pianta et alzata della città di Roma con tutte le strade, piazze et edificii de tempi, palazzi, giardini et altre fabbriche antiche e moderne come si trovano al presente nel pontificato di N.S. Papa Innocentio X con le loro dichiarationi nomi et indice copiosissimo, Rome, de Rossi, 1676.
- Li Giardini Di Roma Con le Loro Piante Alzate e Vedute in Prospettiva (with Simone Felice), Rome, de Rossi, 1678.

== Bibliography ==
- Kristeller, Paul (1915). "Kupferstichkabinett. Zeichnungen von Giovanni Battista Falda". Amtliche Berichte aus den Königlichen Kunstsammlungen (in German). 36 (6): 6–8. JSTOR 4235087.
- Kostial McGuire, Diane (1964). "Old Garden Prints: A Neglected Art". Landscape Architecture Magazine. 54 (4): 284–289. JSTOR 44665354.
- Margiotta, Anita; Tozzi, Simonetta (1994). "FALDA, Giovanni Battista". Dizionario Biografico degli Italiani (in Italian). Vol. 44: Fabron–Farina. Rome: Istituto dell'Enciclopedia Italiana. ISBN 978-88-12-00032-6.
- Chappell, Miles L. (2003). "Falda, Giovanni Battista". Grove Art Online. Oxford: Oxford University Press. doi:10.1093/gao/9781884446054.article.T027427.
