= Soriso =

- Comune
- Comune di Soriso
- Location within Italy Location within Piedmont
- Coordinates: 45°44′N 8°25′E
- Country: Italy
- Region: Piedmont
- Province: Novara (NO)

Government
  - Mayor: Augusto Caganino

Area
  - Total: 6.37 km^{2} (2.46 sq mi)
- Elevation: 452 m (1,483 ft)

Population (Dec. 2004)
  - Total: 746
  - Density: 117/km^{2} (303/sq mi)
- Demonym: Sorisesi
- Time zone: UTC+1 (CET)
  - Summer (DST): UTC+2 (CEST)
- Postal code: 28018
- Dialing code: 0322
- Website: Official website

Soriso is a comune (municipality) in the Province of Novara in the Italian region Piedmont, located about 90 kilometres (56 mi) northeast of Turin and about 35 kilometres (22 mi) northwest of Novara.

Soriso borders the following municipalities: Gargallo, Gozzano, Pogno, and Valduggia.

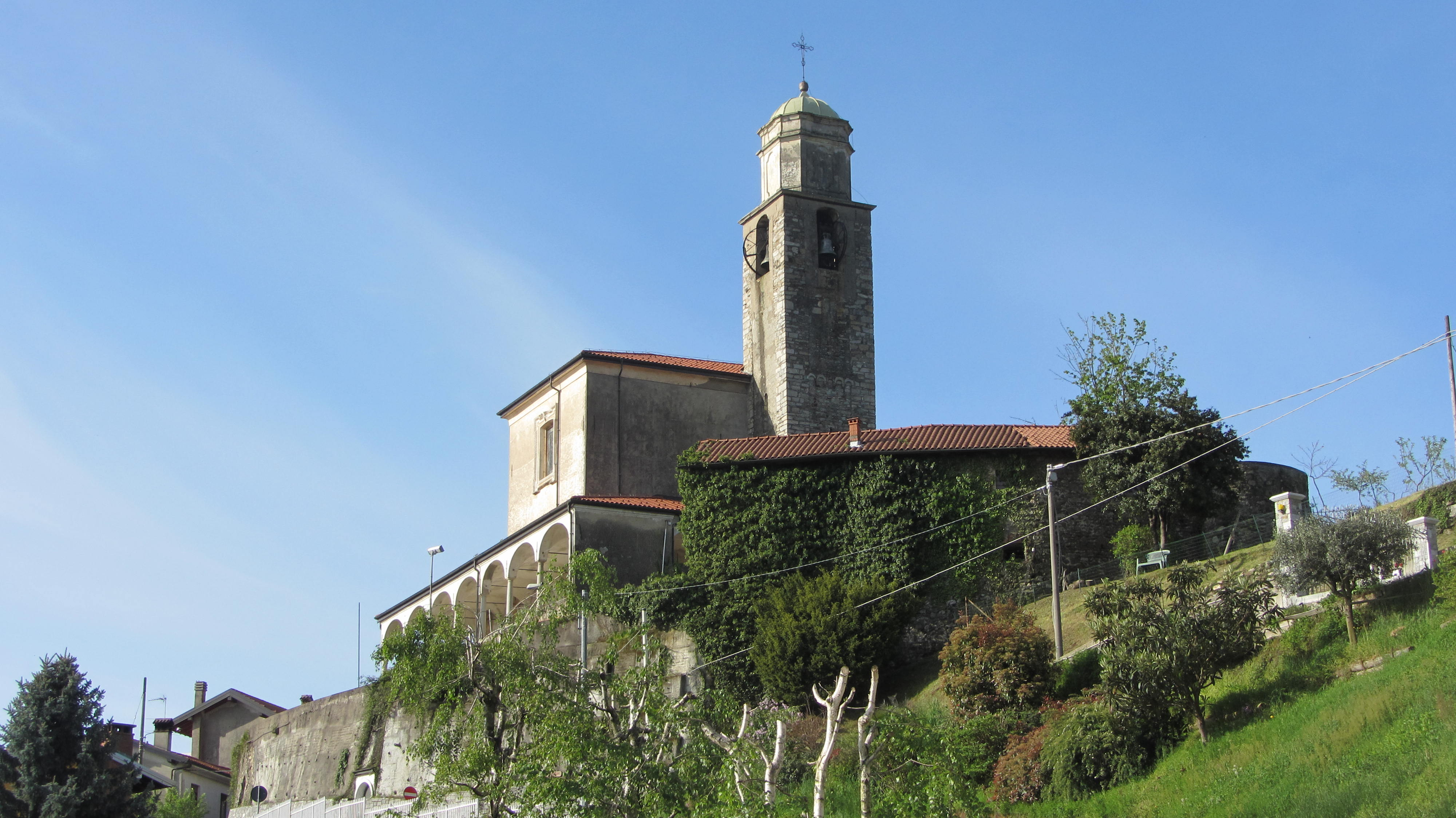
