= Maggiora =

- Comune
- Comune di Maggiora
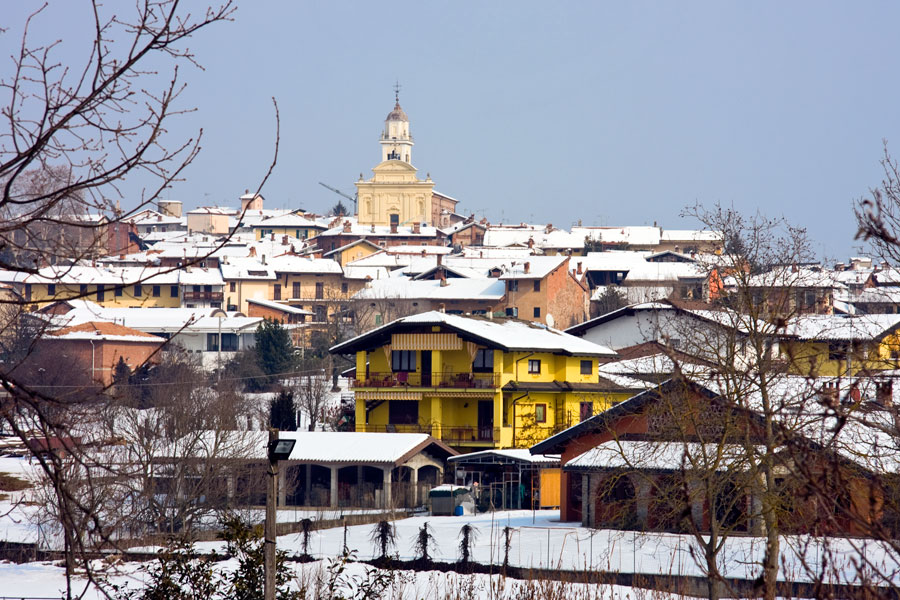
- View of Maggiora

- Coat of arms

- Location within Italy Location within Piedmont
- Coordinates: 45°41′N 8°26′E
- Country: Italy
- Region: Piedmont
- Province: Novara (NO)

Government
  - Mayor: Roberto Balzano

Area
  - Total: 10.7 km^{2} (4.1 sq mi)
- Elevation: 397 m (1,302 ft)

Population (Dec. 2004)
  - Total: 1,763
  - Density: 165/km^{2} (427/sq mi)
- Demonym: Maggioresi
- Time zone: UTC+1 (CET)
  - Summer (DST): UTC+2 (CEST)
- Postal code: 28014
- Dialing code: 0322
- Website: Official website

Maggiora is a comune (municipality) in the Province of Novara in the Italian region Piedmont, located about 90 kilometres (56 mi) northeast of Turin and about 30 kilometres (19 mi) northwest of Novara.

Maggiora borders the following municipalities: Boca, Borgomanero, Cureggio, Gargallo, and Valduggia.
