= Gozzano, Piedmont =

Gozzano Gozzoeun (Lombard)
- Comune
- Comune di Gozzano
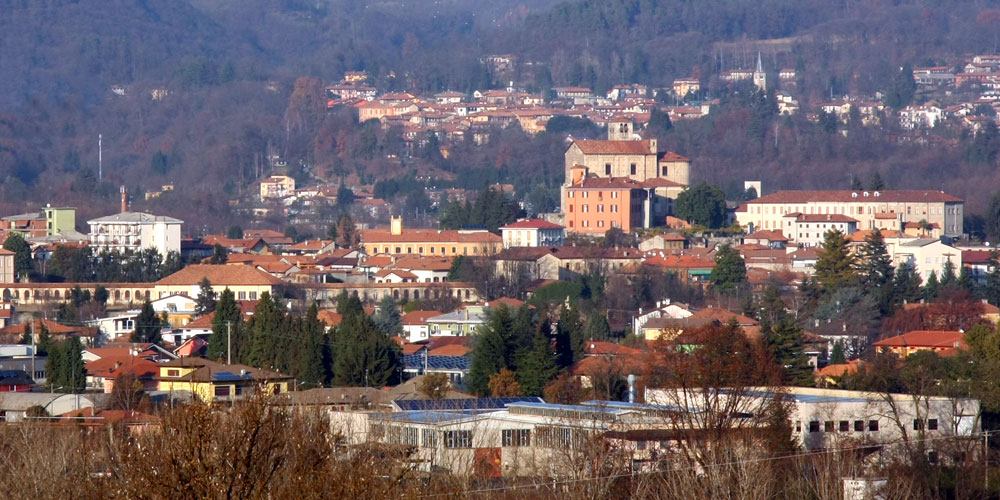
- View of Gozzano

- Location within Italy Location within Piedmont
- Coordinates: 45°45′N 8°26′E
- Country: Italy
- Region: Piedmont
- Province: Novara (NO)
- Frazioni: Auzate, Bugnate

Government
  - Mayor: Gianluca Godio

Area
  - Total: 12.5 km^{2} (4.8 sq mi)
- Elevation: 367 m (1,204 ft)

Population (Dec. 2004)
  - Total: 5,949
  - Density: 476/km^{2} (1,230/sq mi)
- Demonym: Gozzanesi
- Time zone: UTC+1 (CET)
  - Summer (DST): UTC+2 (CEST)
- Postal code: 28024
- Dialing code: 0322
- Website: www.comune.gozzano.no.it

Gozzano (Italian: [ɡodˈdzaːno]; Novarese: Gozzoeun) is a comune (municipality) in the Province of Novara in the Italian region of Piedmont, located about 100 kilometres (62 mi) northeast of Turin and about 35 kilometres (22 mi) northwest of Novara.

Gozzano borders the following municipalities: Bolzano Novarese, Borgomanero, Briga Novarese, Gargallo, Invorio, Orta San Giulio, Pogno, San Maurizio d'Opaglio, and Soriso.

The Comboni Missionaries operated a novitiate for their intending missionaries in Gozzano during the 1950s and 1960s.

== Sport ==
Gozzano's football team is A.C. Gozzano, founded in 1924. The team plays its home games at Stadio Alfredo d'Albertas.
