= Anna Maria Canopi =

Italian Benedictine abbess and spiritual writer (1931–2019)

The Right Reverend Mother Abbess Anna Maria Cànopi, O.S.B.
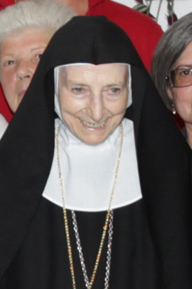
- Mother Canopi in 2009

Personal life
- Born: Rina Cànopi; 24 April 1931 Alta Val Tidone, Piacenza, Kingdom of Italy
- Died: 21 March 2019 (aged 87) Isola San Giulio
- Home town: Orta San Giulio, Novara, Italy
- Notable work: See Works

Religious life
- Religion: Christianity
- Denomination: Catholic Church
- Order: Order of St. Benedict
- Institute: Mater Ecclesiae Abbey

Military service
- Rank: Abbess

Anna Maria Cànopi, O.S.B., (24 April 1931 – 21 March 2019) was an Italian Benedictine abbess and spiritual writer.

== Life ==
Cànopi was born in 1931 in Pecorara, now in Alta Val Tidone, Province of Piacenza, then part of the Kingdom of Italy. As a young girl, she became drawn to monastic life. This led her to enter the Benedictine Abbey of Viboldone, near Milan.

In 1973 Cànopi was chosen to lead a small group of nuns who were to establish the new Mater Ecclesiae Monastery, which was to be located on San Giulio Island, on Lake Orta. Under her leadership, the monastery flourished and was later raised to the status of a territorial abbey, with Cànopi being elected as the first abbess of the community.

Abbess Cànopi became widely known as an author of several books on biblical and monastic spirituality and was considered a prominent scholar in patristic literature. She contributed to the publication of the official translation of the Bible by the Italian Bishops' Conference. She was also invited to write the text of the Via Crucis (Way of the Cross) used by Pope John Paul II on Good Friday evening at Rome's Colosseum in 1993.

== Works ==
- Way of the Cross with Pope John Paul II (1994) ISBN 978-0-8198-8270-7
- La Grande Settimana: Commento spirituale ai testi liturgici e ad alcune melodie gregoriane (2007) Edizionne Paoline ISBN 9788831532051
- L'anima mia magnifica il Signore: Lectio divina sul Magnificat (2008) Edizionne Paoline ISBN 9788831533959
- Siate lieti nel Signore: Lectio divina sulla Lettera ai Filippesi (2008) Edizionne Paoline ISBN 9788831535144
- Eredi di Dio, coeredi di Cristo: Lectio divina sulla Lettera ai Romani (2009) Edizionne Paoline ISBN 9788831535540
- Scelti per essere santi: Lectio divina sulla Lettera agli Efesini (2009) Edizionne Paoline ISBN 9788831535632
- Le sette parole di Gesù in croce: Meditazione e preghiera (2009) Edizionne Paoline ISBN 9788831535526
- Mansuétude Voie de paix (2010) Médiaspaul France ISBN 9782712210953
- Fame di Dio: L’Eucaristia nella vita quotidiana (2011) Edizionne Paoline ISBN 9788831540124
- Misericordia e consolazione: Il Dio di Gesú Cristo (2015) Edizionne Paoline ISBN 9788831546096

== Bibliography ==
- Il silenzio si fa preghiera. Omaggio a madre Anna Maria Cànopi with Matteo Albergante and Roberto Cutaia (2020) Edizioni Paoline ISBN 8831551418
- Anna Maria Cànopi. Madre per sempre. Badessa, mistica e poetessa with Roberto Cutaia and Matteo Albergante (2022) Edizioni La Fontana di Siloe ISBN 9788867371518
