= Basilica di San Giulio =

Church in Novara, Italy

Coordinates: 45.7955°N 8.3994°E

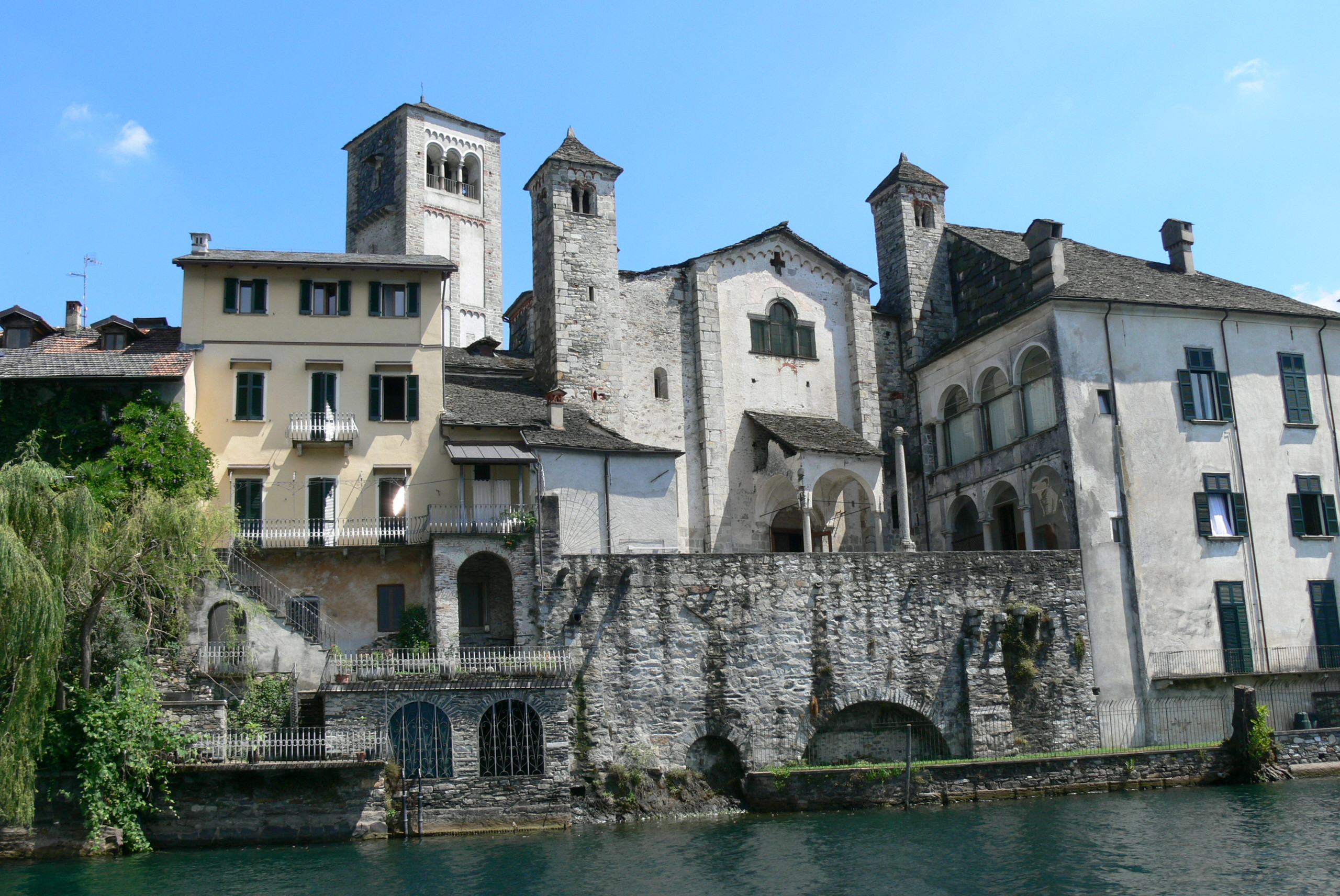
Outside of the basilica

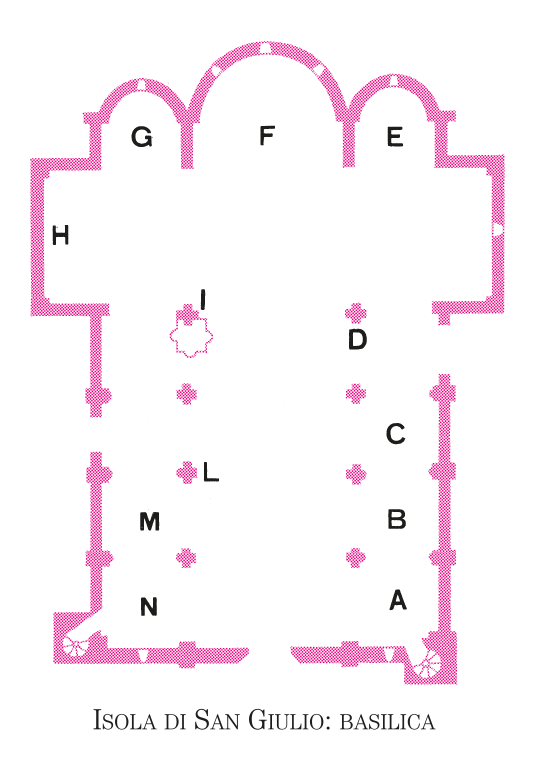
Plan of the church

The Basilica di San Giulio is a Roman Catholic church on the small San Giulio Island in the center of Lake Orta, province of Novara, north-western Italy. It has the status of a minor basilica. Although the island is part of the Orta San Giulio municipality, the basilica belongs to the San Giacomo parish, including the island and a portion of the west coast of the lake in San Maurizio d'Opaglio municipality.

== History ==
According to tradition, it was the hundredth, and last, church founded by Julius of Novara and his brother Julian, both natives of Aegina in Greece, who dedicated their later years to the evangelization of the area around Lake Orta. Legend has it that around year 390 the saint reached the island sailing on his cloak, and then freed it from dragons (symbols of paganism); after the defeat of the monsters he built a small church devoted to the Twelve Apostles.

In the Early Middle Ages, the strategic position made the island an important defensive point; first, it was the abode of a Lombard duke, then Berengar II of Italy built a castle there. The construction of the castle is sometimes attributed to Onorato, bishop of Novara.

Military constraints and damage during sieges conditioned the development of the church, some parts of which were reused as military buildings. The ancient octagonal castle tower, demolished in 1841 in order to allow the construction of the seminary, was probably built upon the prior baptistery.

Archaeological excavations inside the church have found traces of an ancient basilica (5th to 6th century), a small north oriented chapel with a single apse. Around a century later, a new church was built, bigger and correctly oriented, but still with a single apse. It is supposed that the during the wars that occurred in 962, the fortress (occupied by Queen Willa, Berengar's wife) was besieged by Otto I, Holy Roman Emperor; this may have damaged the early Middle Ages church. The modern church, constructed in the 12th century, is Romanesque, with a nave and two aisles, but was again modified in the following centuries.

Inside there is a precious 12th-century Romanesque ambon (sculpted in green serpentine marble) supported by four more ancient columns. It is decorated with the symbols of the Four Evangelists, scenes of struggle between good and evil and a male figure that may, according to some, represents William of Volpiano, born on the island in 962.

=== Exterior ===
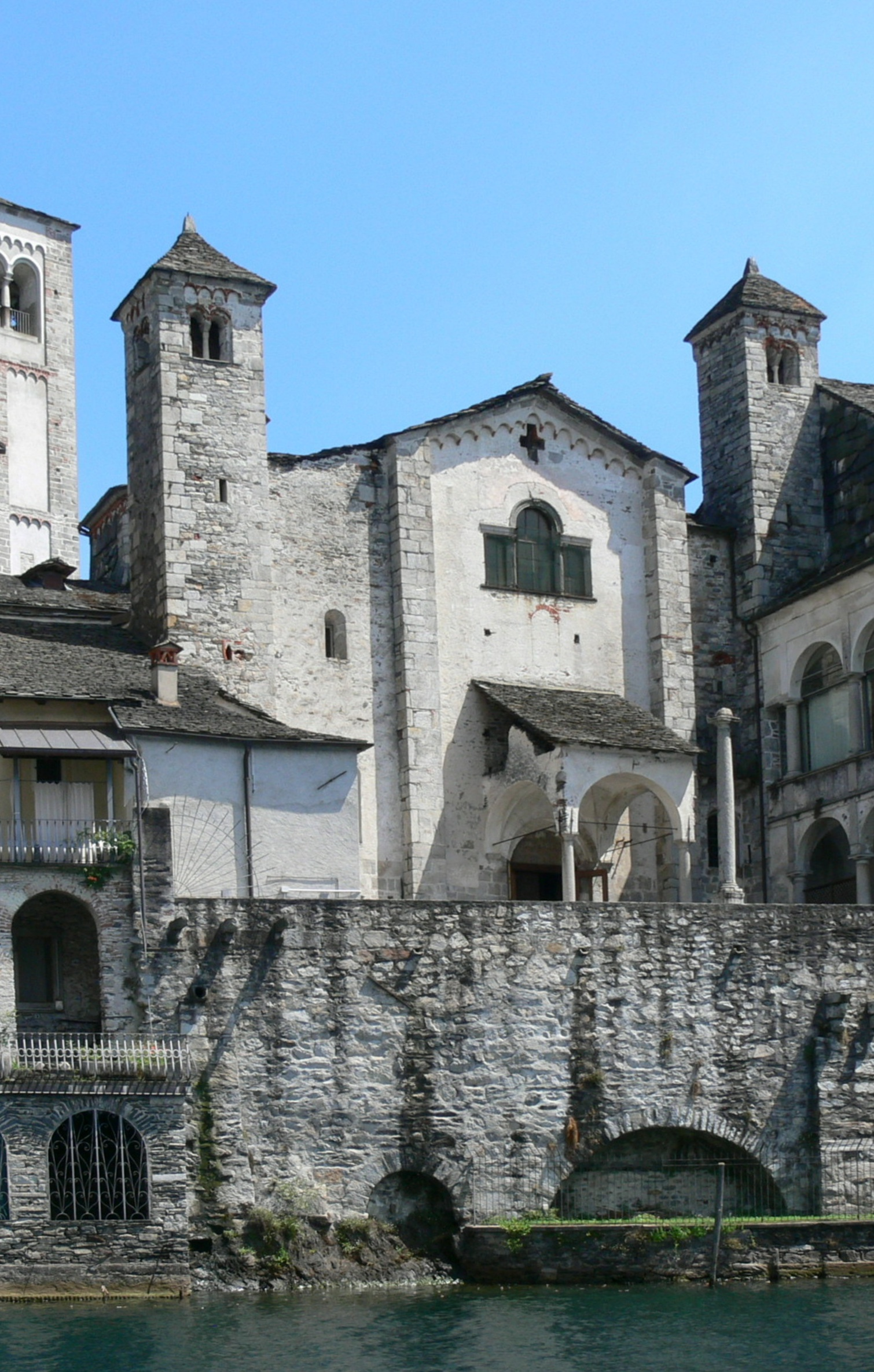
The façade seen from the lake

The façade of the church, now part of a Benedictine monastery, is visible from the lake and from the square in front. The facade is in Romanesque style, despite modifications that occurred in the 16th century including a pronaos and a serliana window on top of it. Two pilasters frame the entrance up to the roof: they divide the façade in three allowing one to foresee the inner structure of the church; in the center part, there are a crossed window and a Lombard band running along the roof. The two lateral parts end with towers (12th century) with mullioned windows and cotto archivolt.

The entrance for the visitors of the basilica is on the south side, almost entirely hidden by the ancient Bishop palace (today the nuns' monastery); it can be reached from the jetty through a renaissance portal and a vaulted stair. The basilica has three apses (one entirely hidden by the sacristy); the central one is constructed with ashlars and is decorated with a Lombard frieze.

The octagonal lantern tower dates to the Romanesque period but was modified in the late 18th century. The bell tower is near the apsides and is decorated with mullioned windows in the upper part. The style of the bell tower is similar to the one in the Abbey of Fruttuaria.

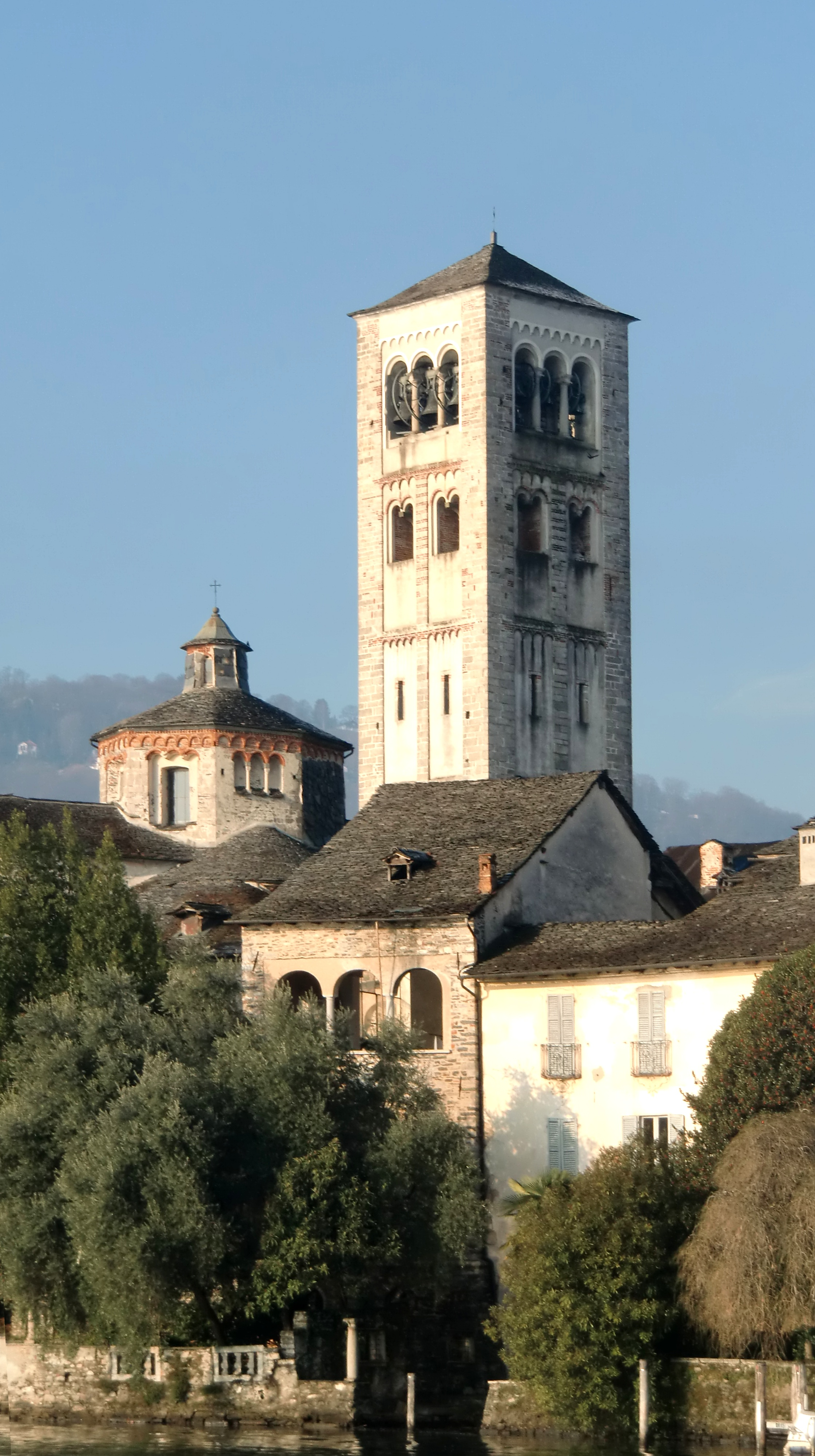
The bell tower and the lantern tower.

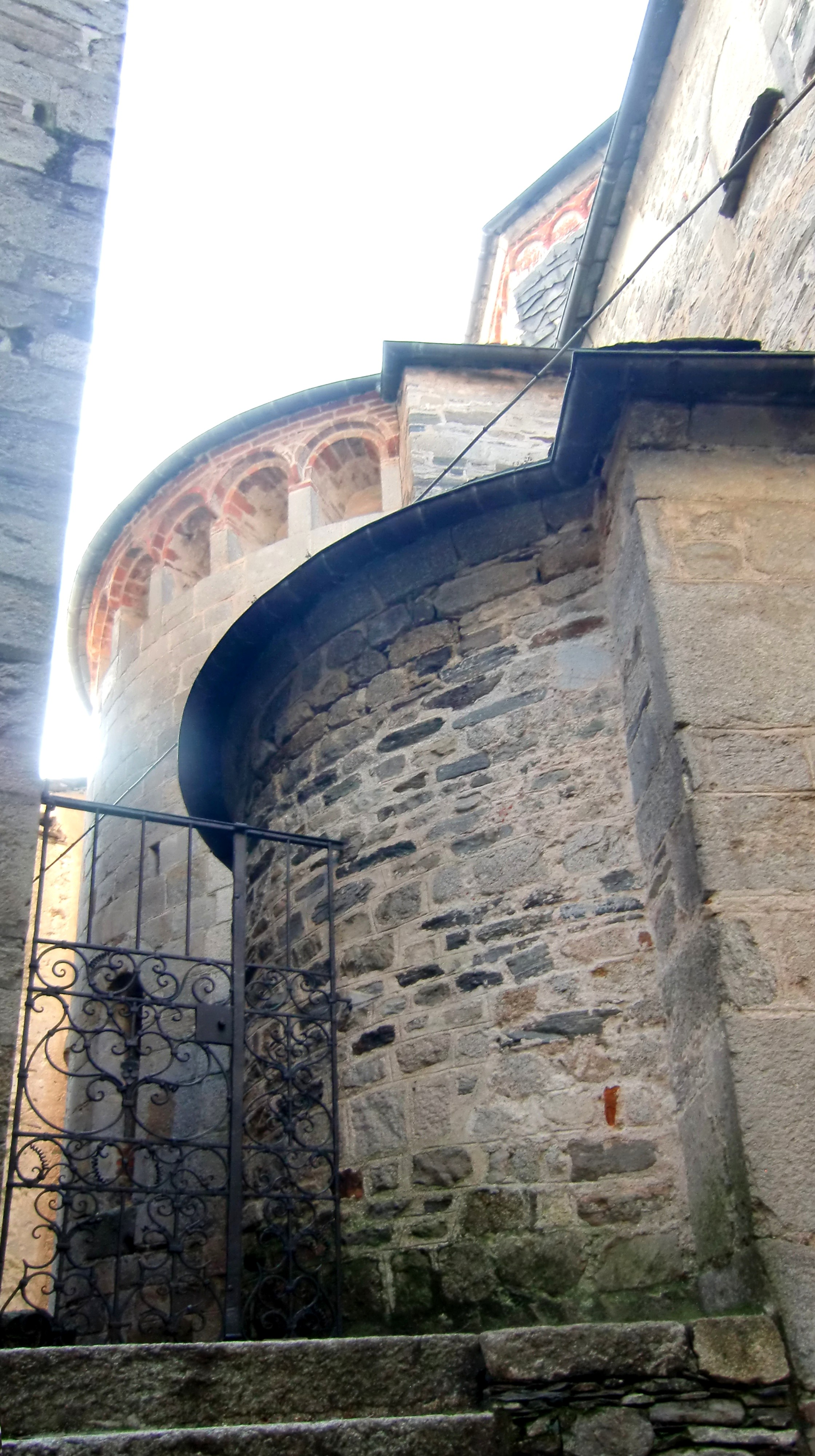
The apse area.

=== Inside ===
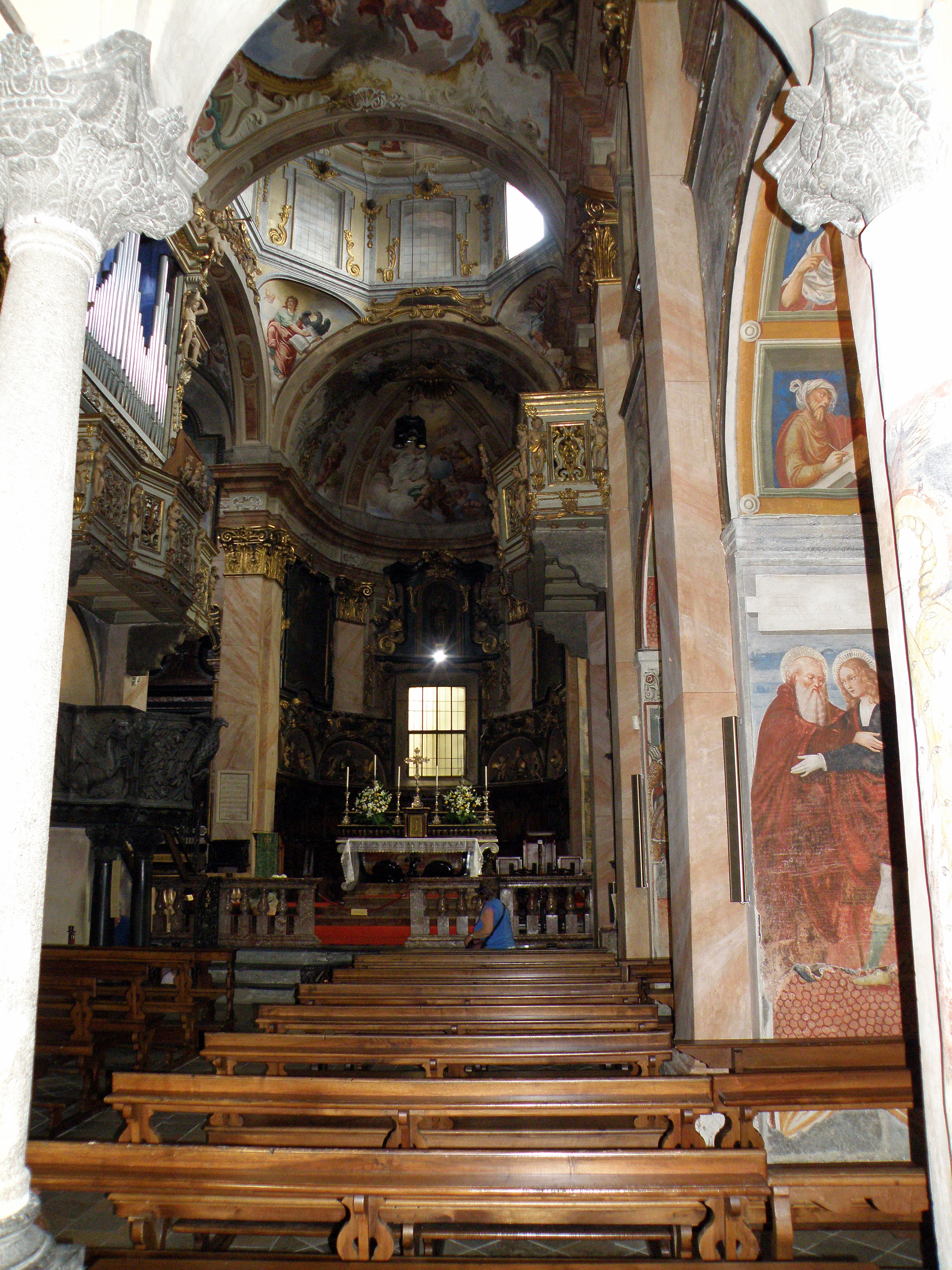
Inside

The basilica's nave and aisles are covered with groin vaults. It is possible to see the two matronei in the aisles: they can be reached from two spiral staircases inside the two small bell towers flanking the façade.

Many of other the architectonical elements are due to the renovation of the 17th to 18th century: the building of an inner nartex connecting the two matronei and the construction of the crypt (1697), with three little aisles preserving the remains of Saint Julius. The crypt is reachable thanks to two stairs aside the above-ground presbytery.

The Baroque look is due to the decorations in the apse semi-dome and in the central aisle vaults: there are frescos by Carlo Borsetti representing the Trinity, the Ascent and glory of Saint Julius with Elijah, Demetrius, Philibert of Jumièges and Audenzio, all buried in the church together with the patron saint. In the left chapel (so called Assumption chapel) there is a painting by Francesco del Cairo of the Assumption of Mary; in the transept there is the great canvas Saint Julius meets Saint Audenzio by Giuseppe Zanatta and Saint Julius subjugating the wolf by Giorgio Bonola.

More ancient art pieces are represented by the Romanesque ambon and by the frescos on the lateral aisles' walls and on the church's pillars, dating back to 14th to 16th century.

In the chapel at the bottom of the left aisle, above the altar there is the beautiful wooden group representing the Calvary with the statues of the Virgin Mary, John the Apostle and the crucifix.

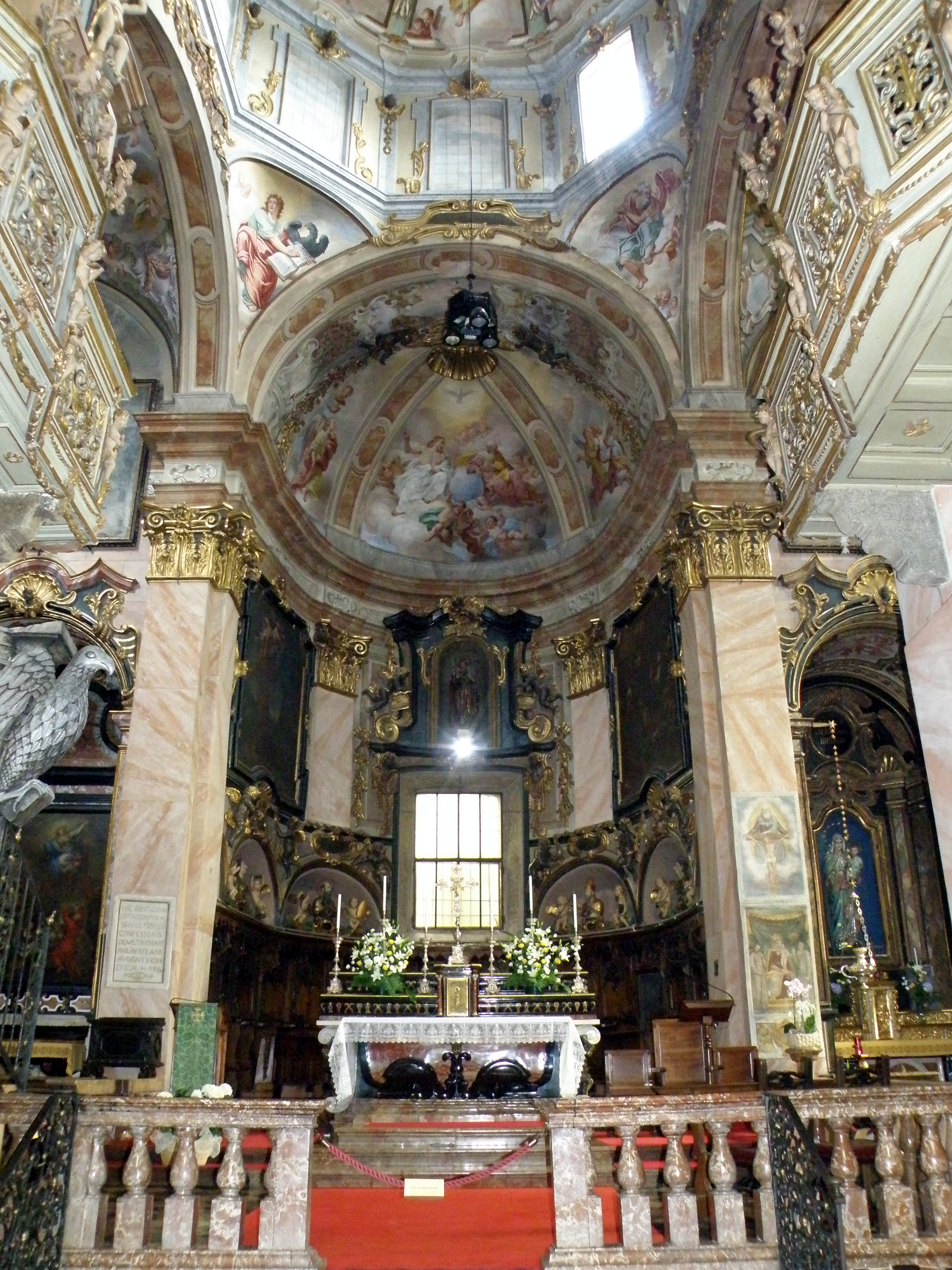
The apse

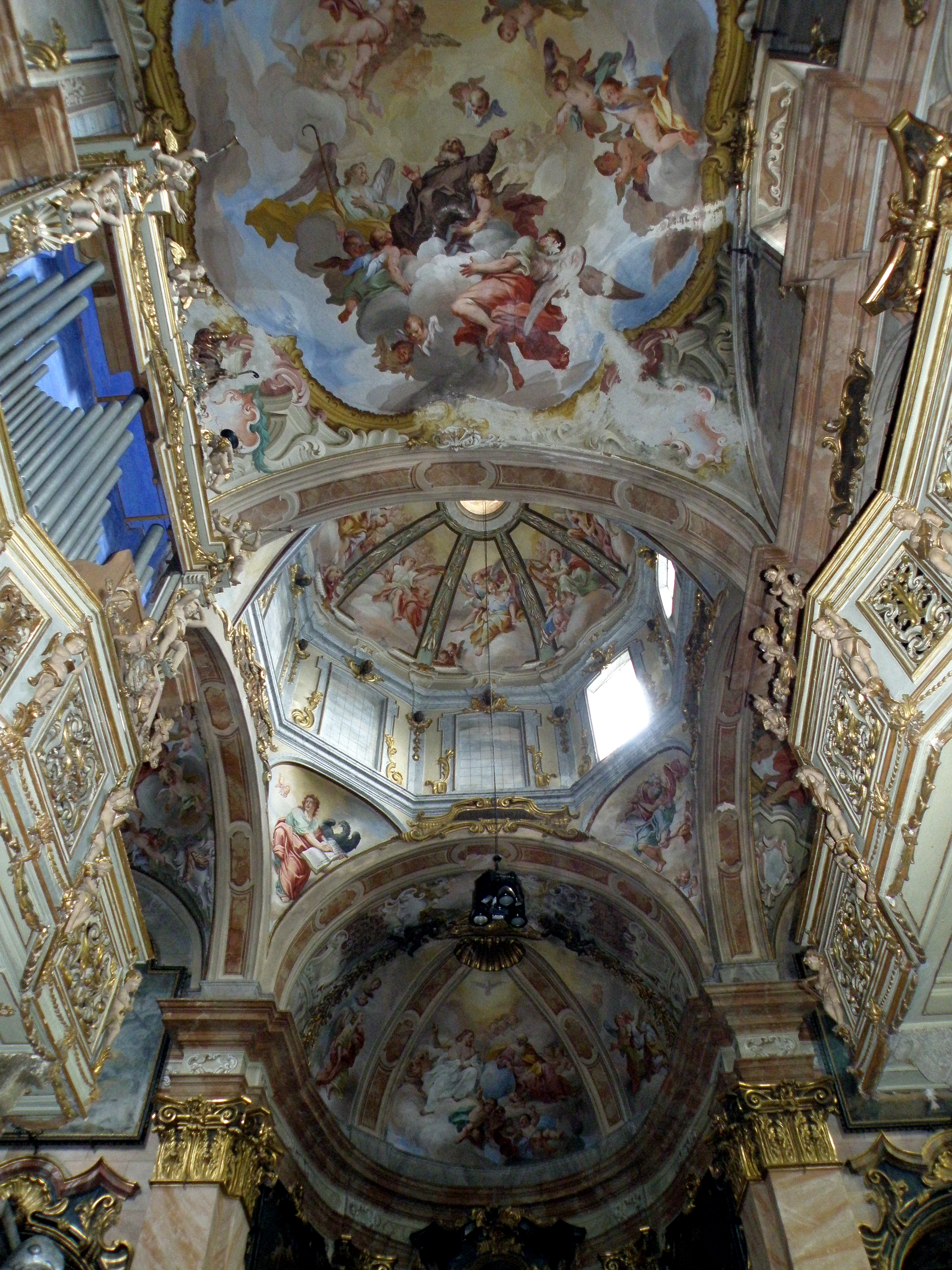
The vault's and dome's frescos

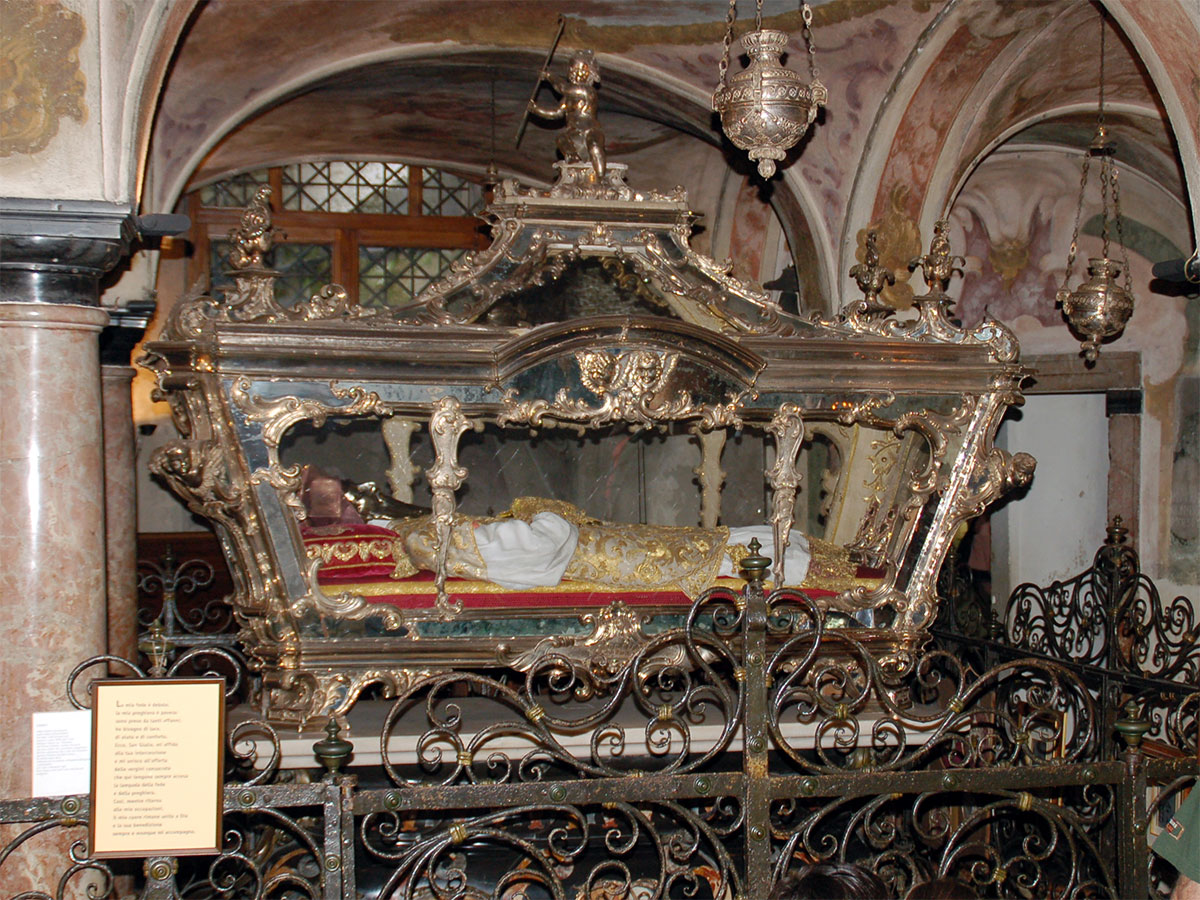
Saint Julius' reliquary

==== The Romanesque ambon ====
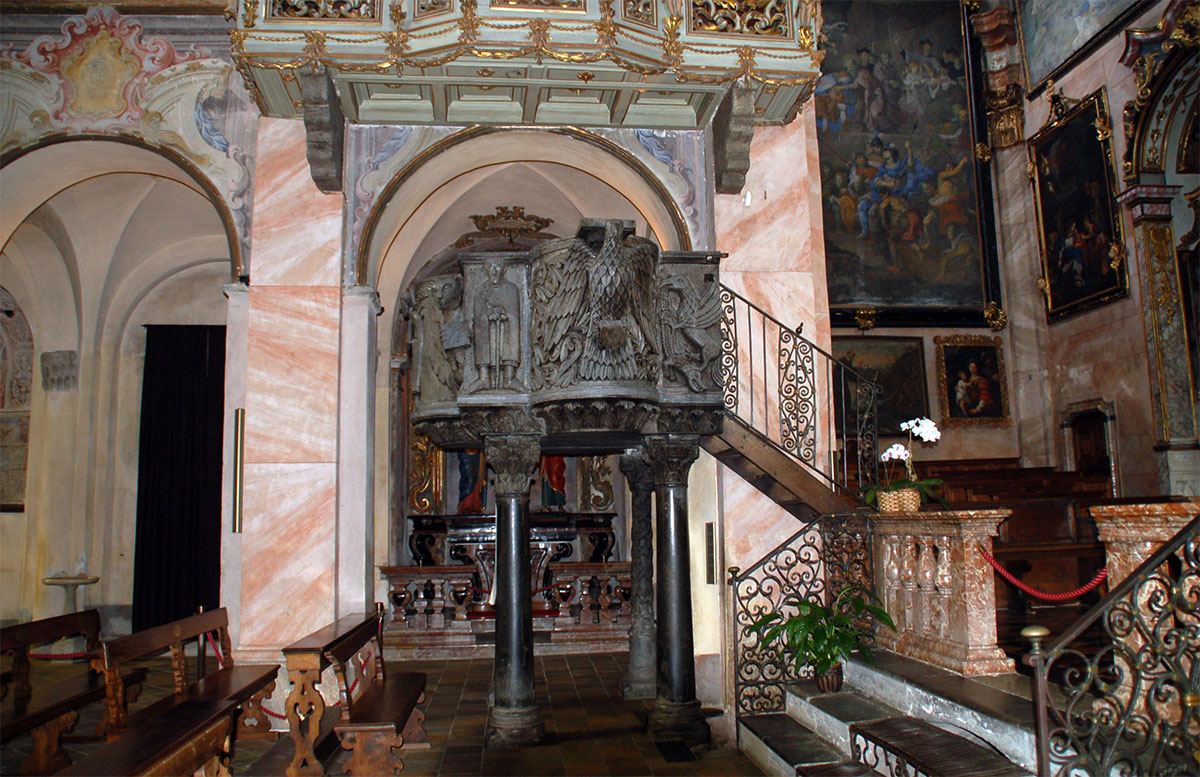
The romanesque ambon (early 12th century)

Built in grey-green serpentine coming from the near cave in Oira, it dates back to the early 12th century. It has a squared drawing with four columns sustaining the parapet, whose base is decorated with Acanthus leaves. The four columns are different one from each other: two have smooth shaft, while the other two are decorated with twisted motives: of particular note are the leaves and animal head-decorated capitals. On the parapet, counter-clockwise, are represented: a Centaur bow hunting a deer hunted by two wild beasts; the Tetramorph and a Griffin biting a crocodile's tail. The two fighting scenes, with typical figures of the medieval bestiaries, mean the struggle between good and evil.

Between Mark the Evangelist's lion and John the Evangelist's eagle there is a male figure with a cloak and hands placed on a tau shaped walking stick: many critics have discussed who the figure might be; one interpretation suggests that it is William of Volpiano, born on the island and venerated as saint. A second option is prophet Daniel.

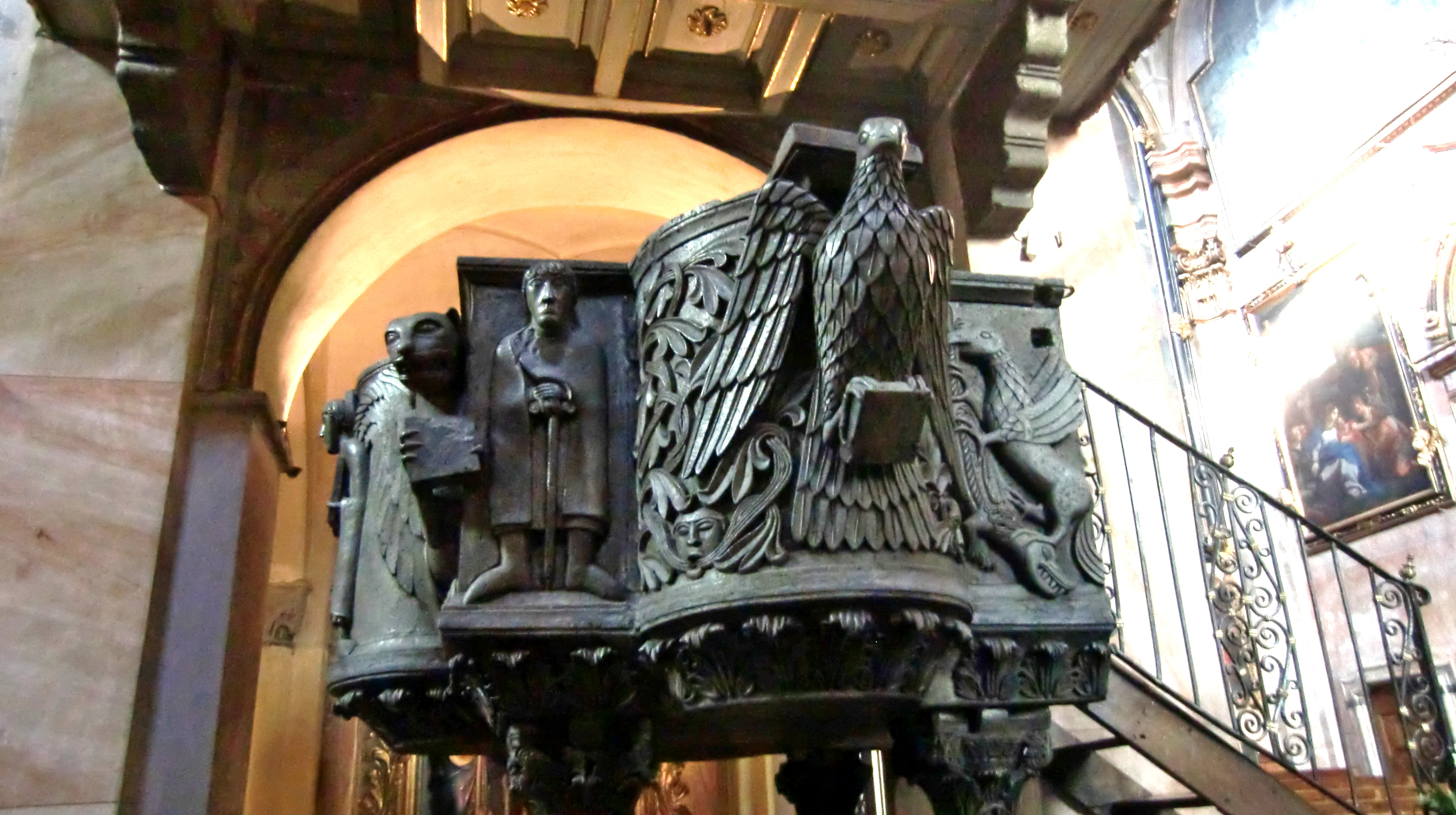
Part of the ambon

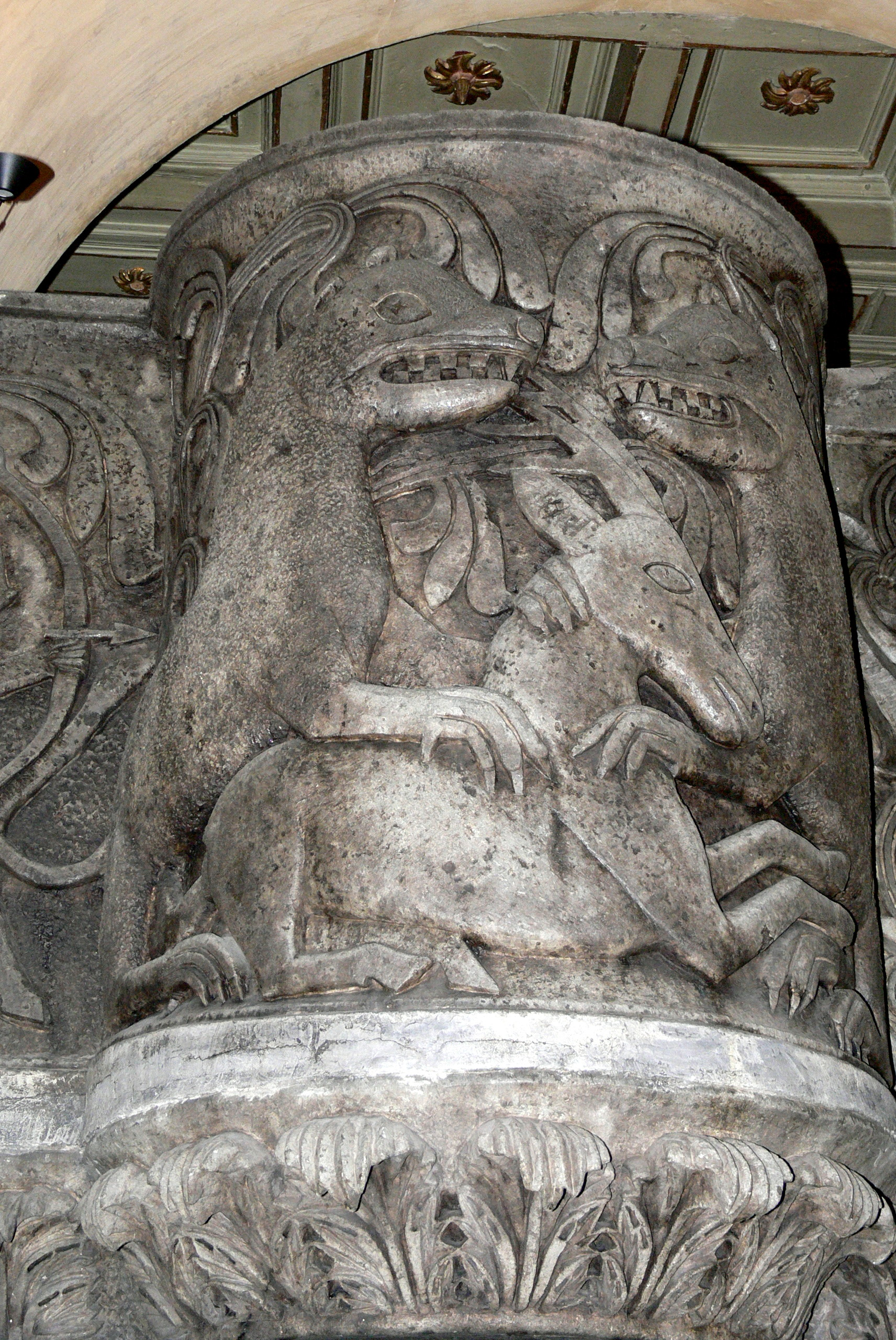
Deer attacked by two wild beasts

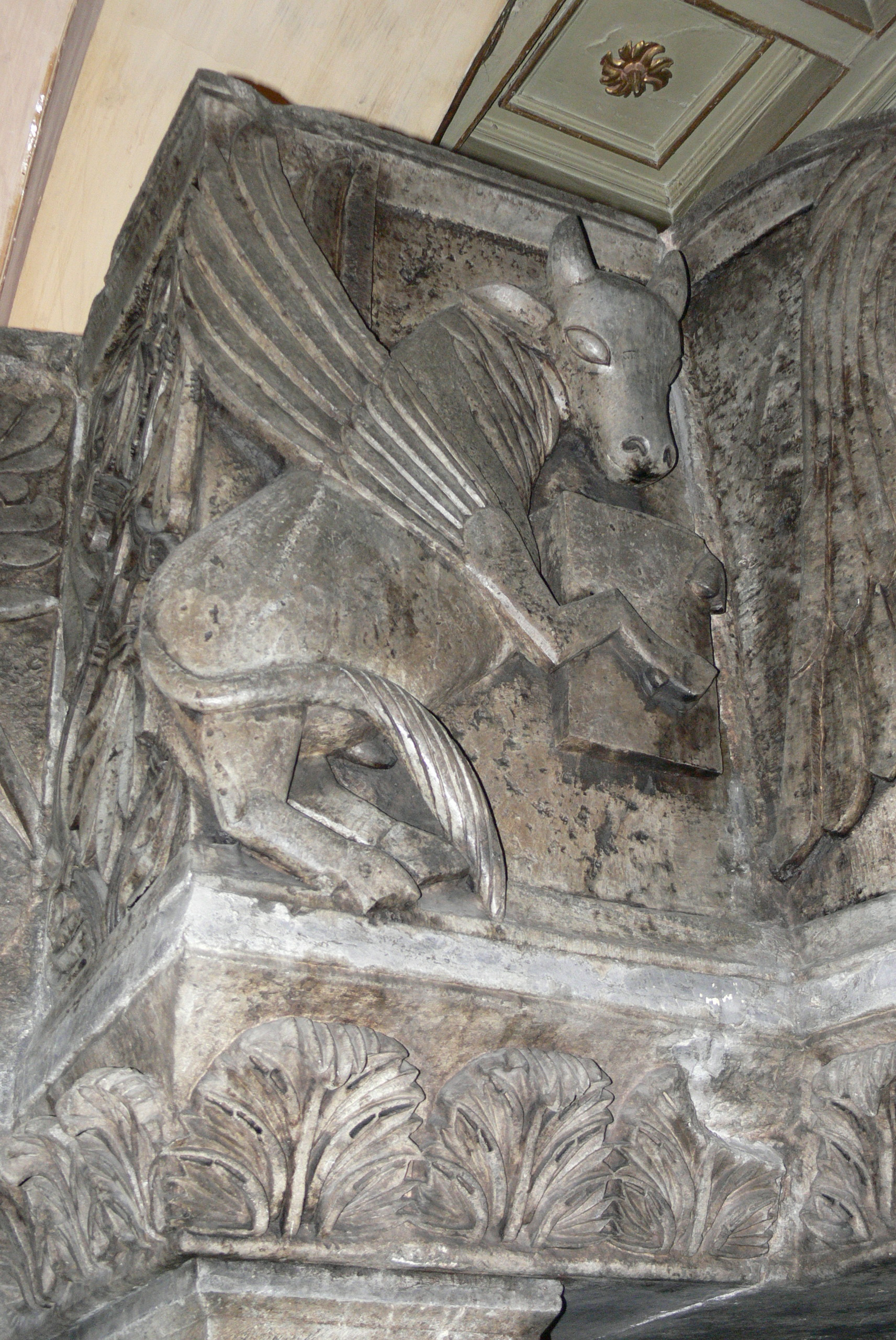
The ox, symbol of Luke the Evangelist

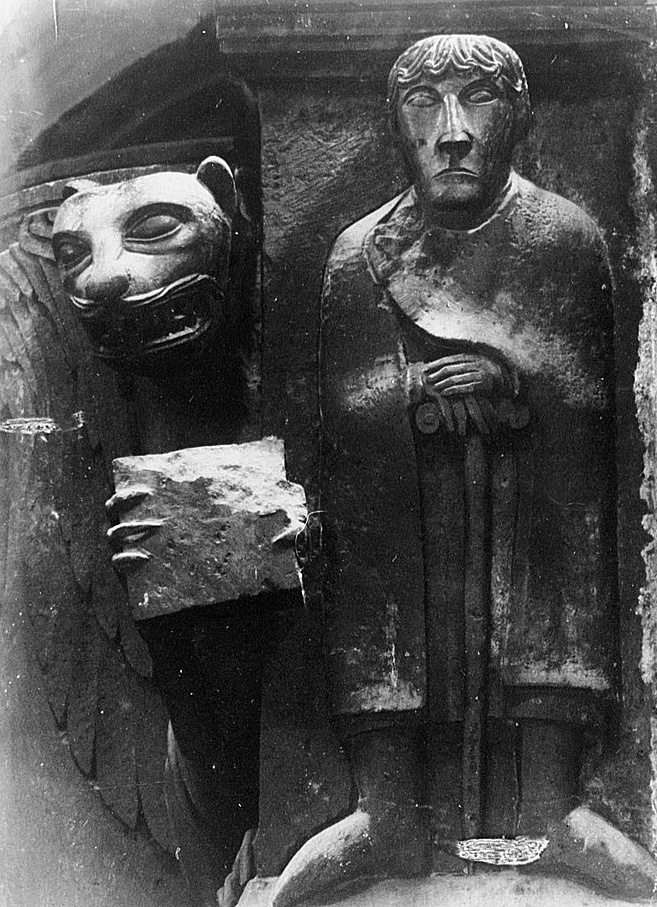
William of Volpiano

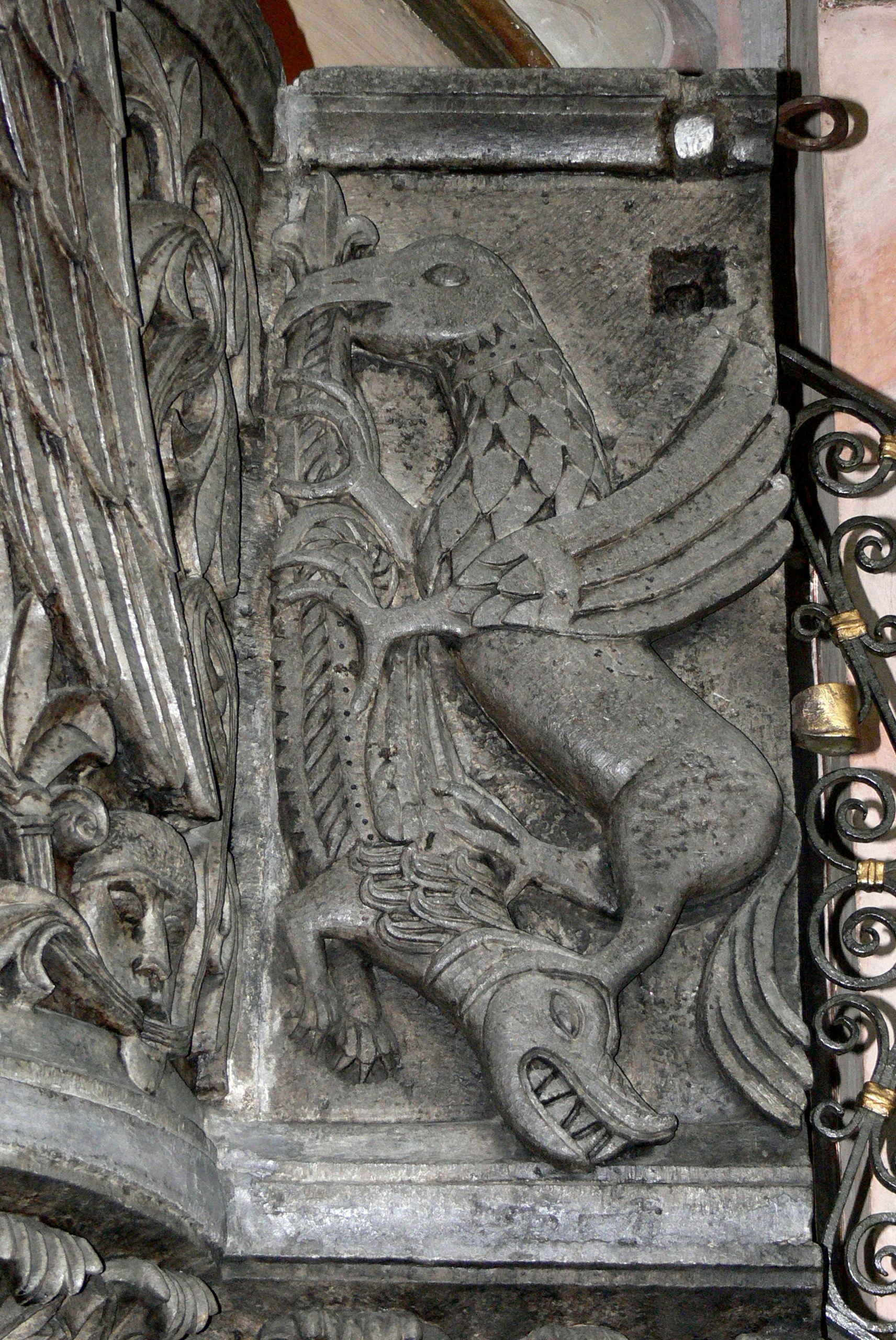
Struggle between a griffin and a crocodile

==== The frescos on the aisles ====
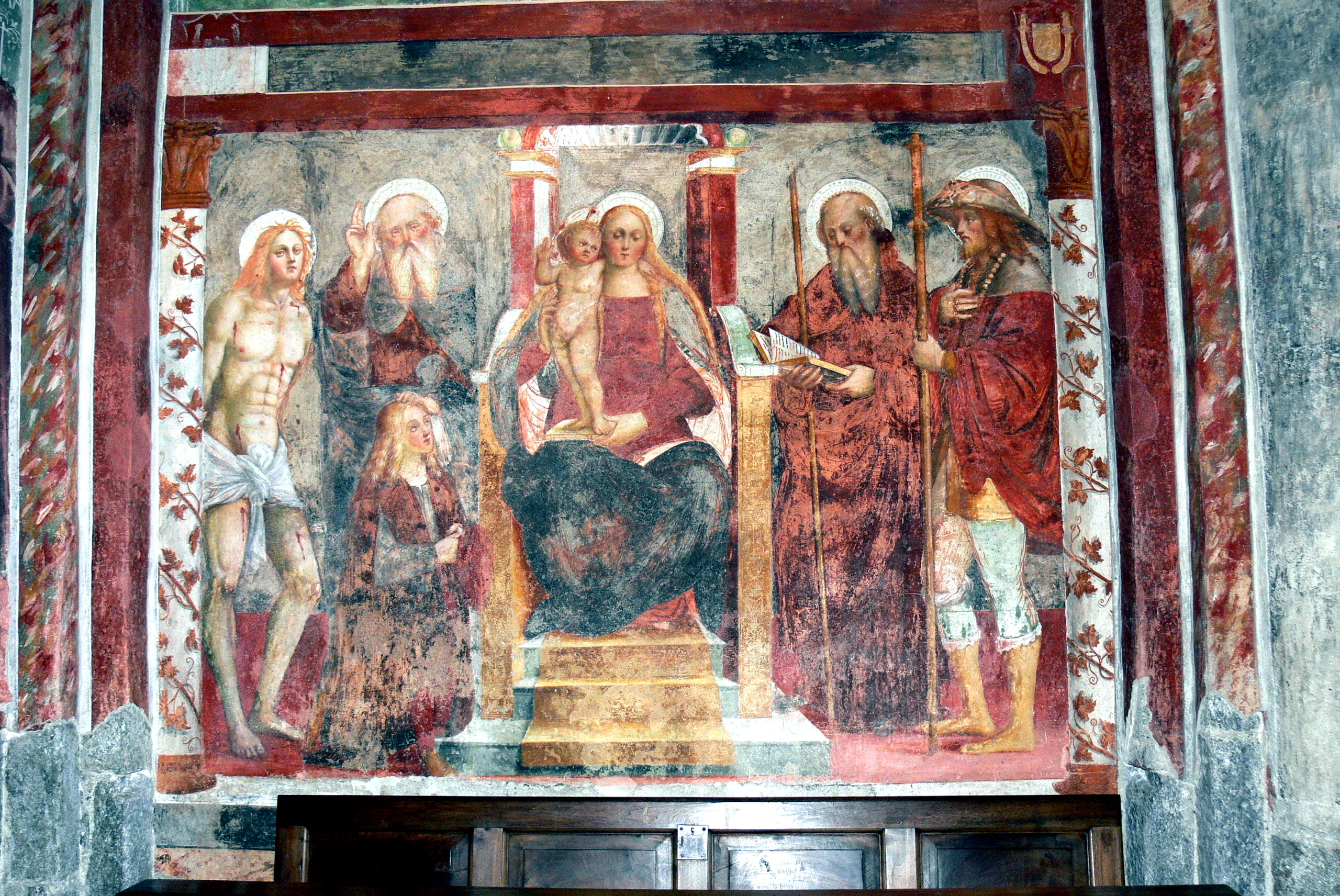
Sperindio Cagnola, Madonna on the throne with baby Jesus among the saints Sebastian, Jack, Julius and Rocco and a devotee

On the walls of the aisles there are many frescos painted as thanksgiving by the commissioners: these paintings were made between the second half of the 14th century and the early 16th century.

The most ancient painting is probably the Martyr of Saint Laurence on the second left pillar. On the pillars there are also Anthony the Great, Martin of Tours, Domninus of Fidenza, Saint Christopher, Julius of Novara, Audenzio, Dorothea of Caesarea, Fermo, Saint Apollonia, Saint Nicholas, Leonard of Noblac. The two frescos Saint Fermo and Saint Apollonia and Saint Julius hugging Saint Audenzio are clearly inspired by the style of Gaudenzio Ferraris.

In the second and third bay of the right aisle there are frescos made by painters from Novara in the late 15th or early 16th century.

In the second right bay: in the rib vaults Doctors of the Church with the Evangelists' symbols; on the wall Virgin Mary in throne with baby Jesus among Saint Sebastian, Saint James, Saint Julius, Saint Roch and a devotee.

In the third bay there are frescos dating back to the 15th century. In the rib vaults Doctors of the Church; on the wall Nativity of Jesus, Saint Cosmas and Damian, Saint Sebastian, Saint Roch, Saint James, Catherine of Alexandria ad Saint Blaise

On the left nave's wall there is a big fresco representing in the upper part the Trinity and, in the lower part Stories of Saint Julius.

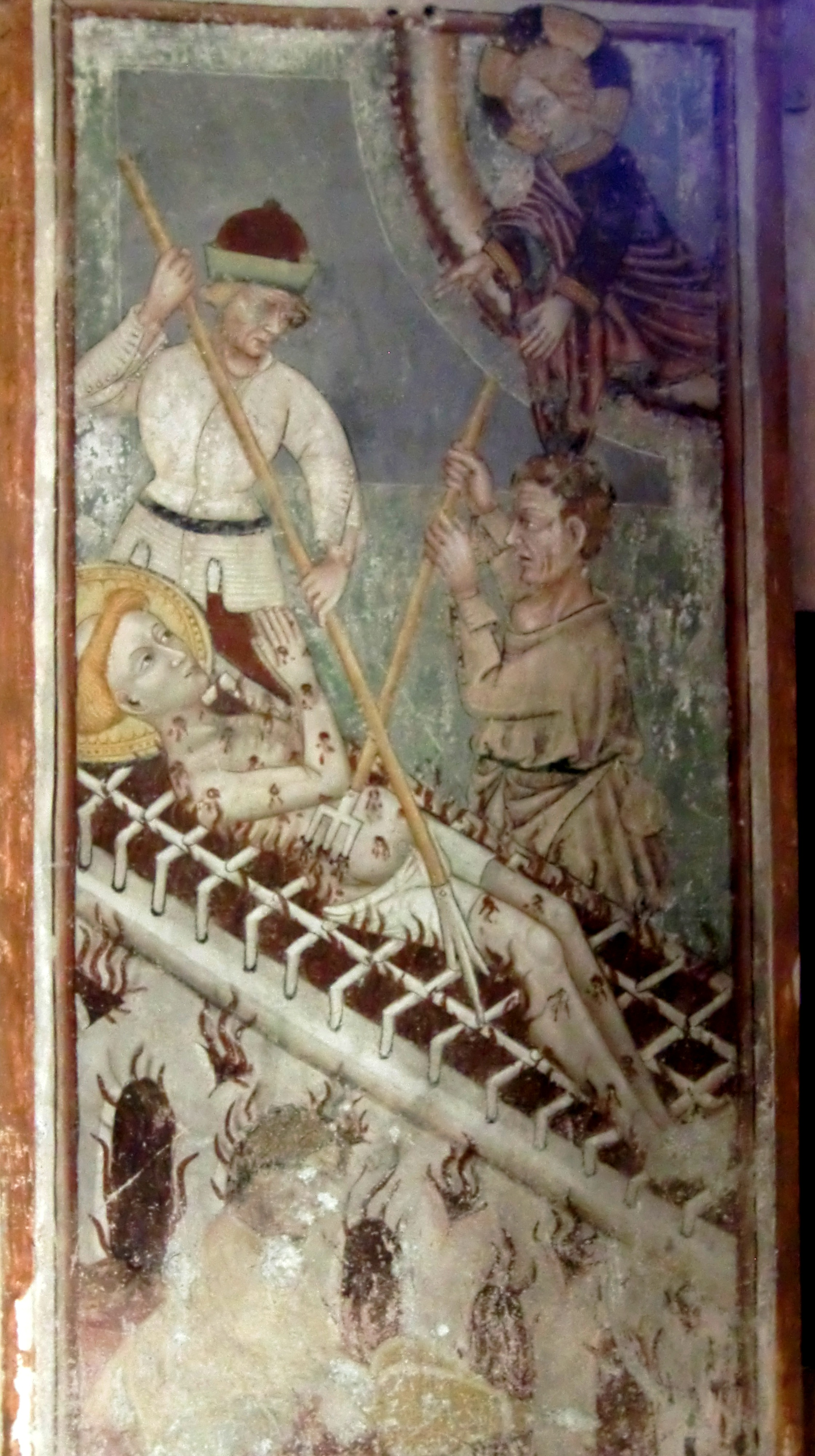
Saint Lawrence's martyr, second half of 14th century

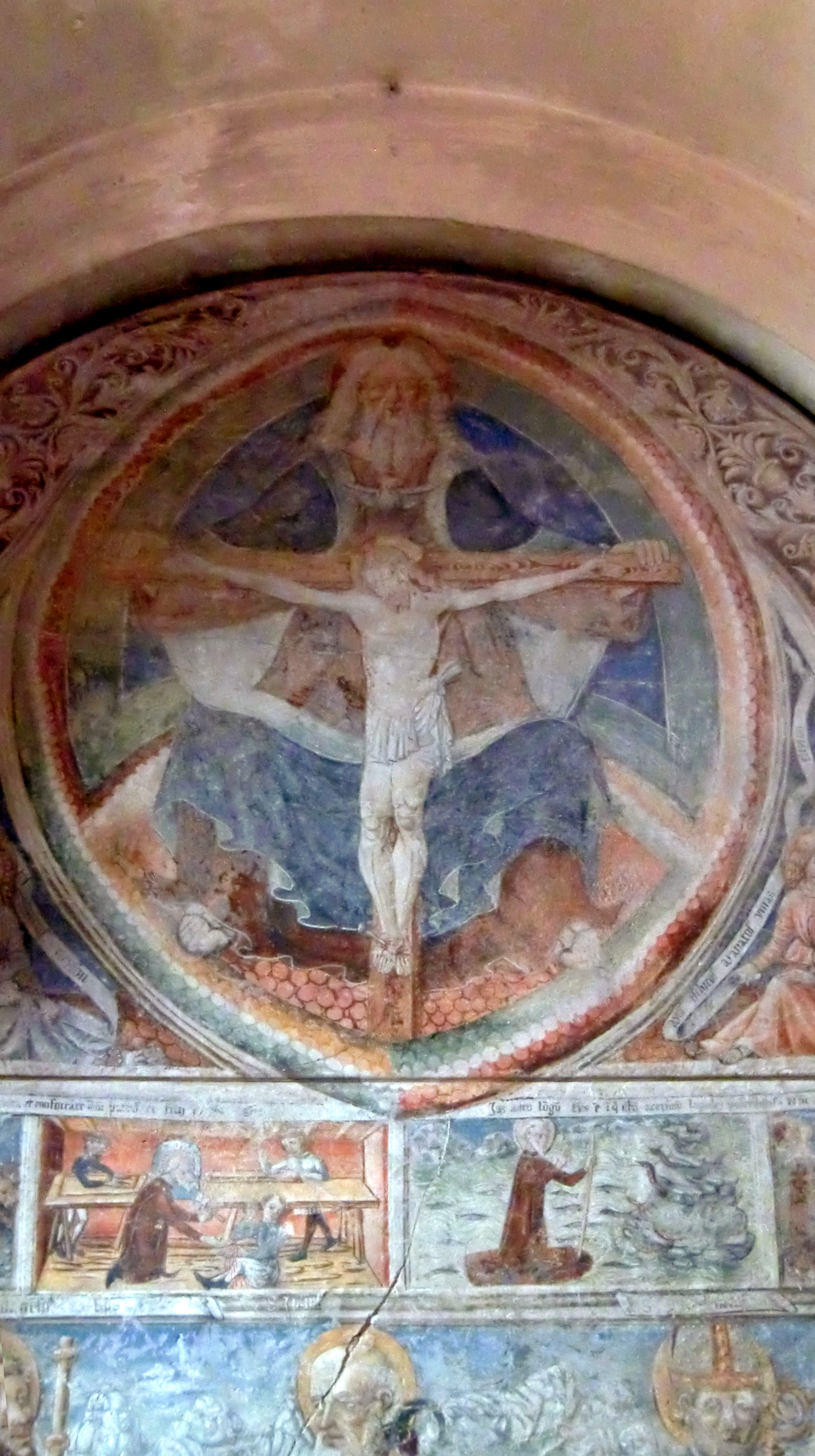
Trinity and Scenes of the life of Saint Julius, left aisle wall, 15th century

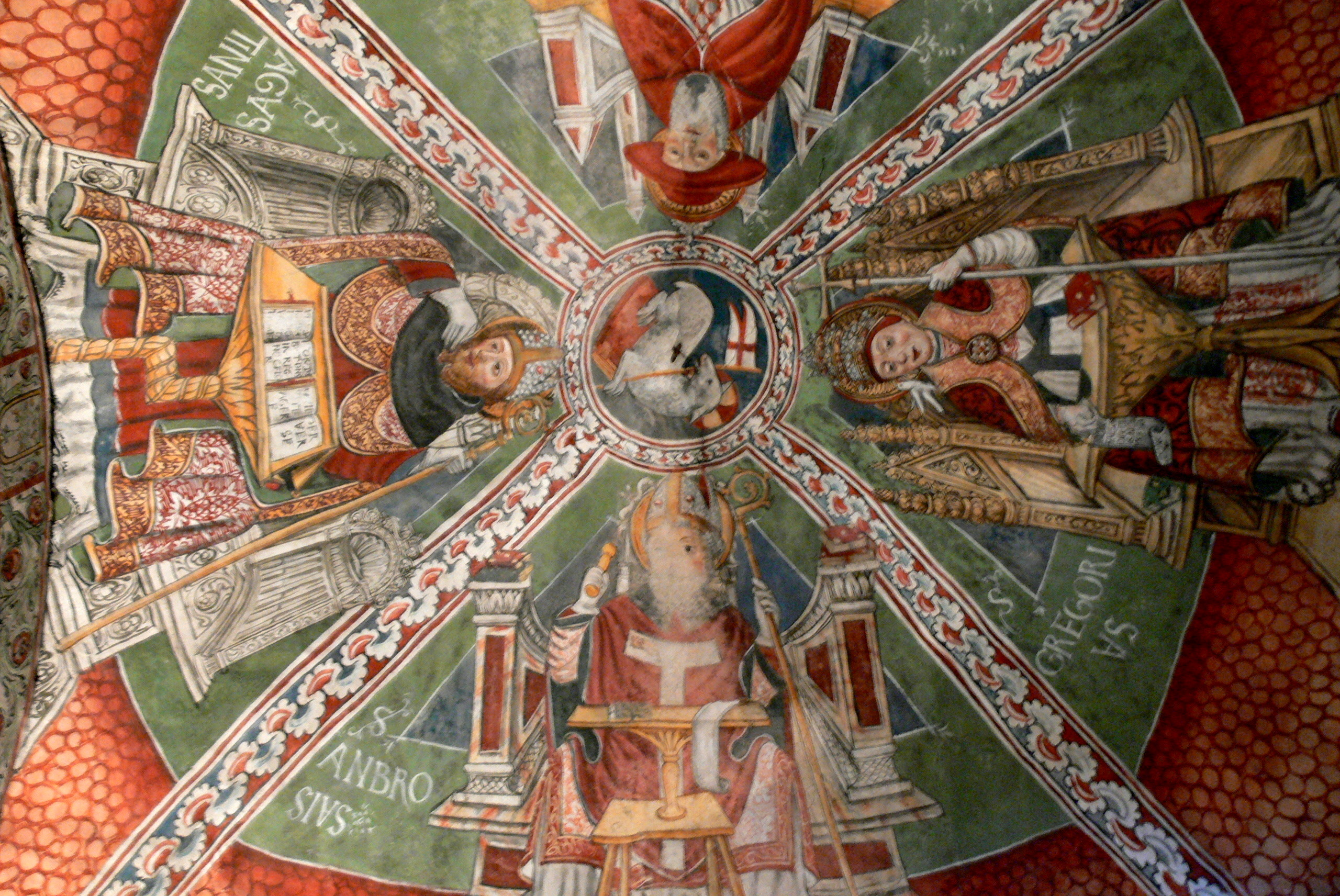
Tommaso Cagnola (?), Doctors of the Church, vault

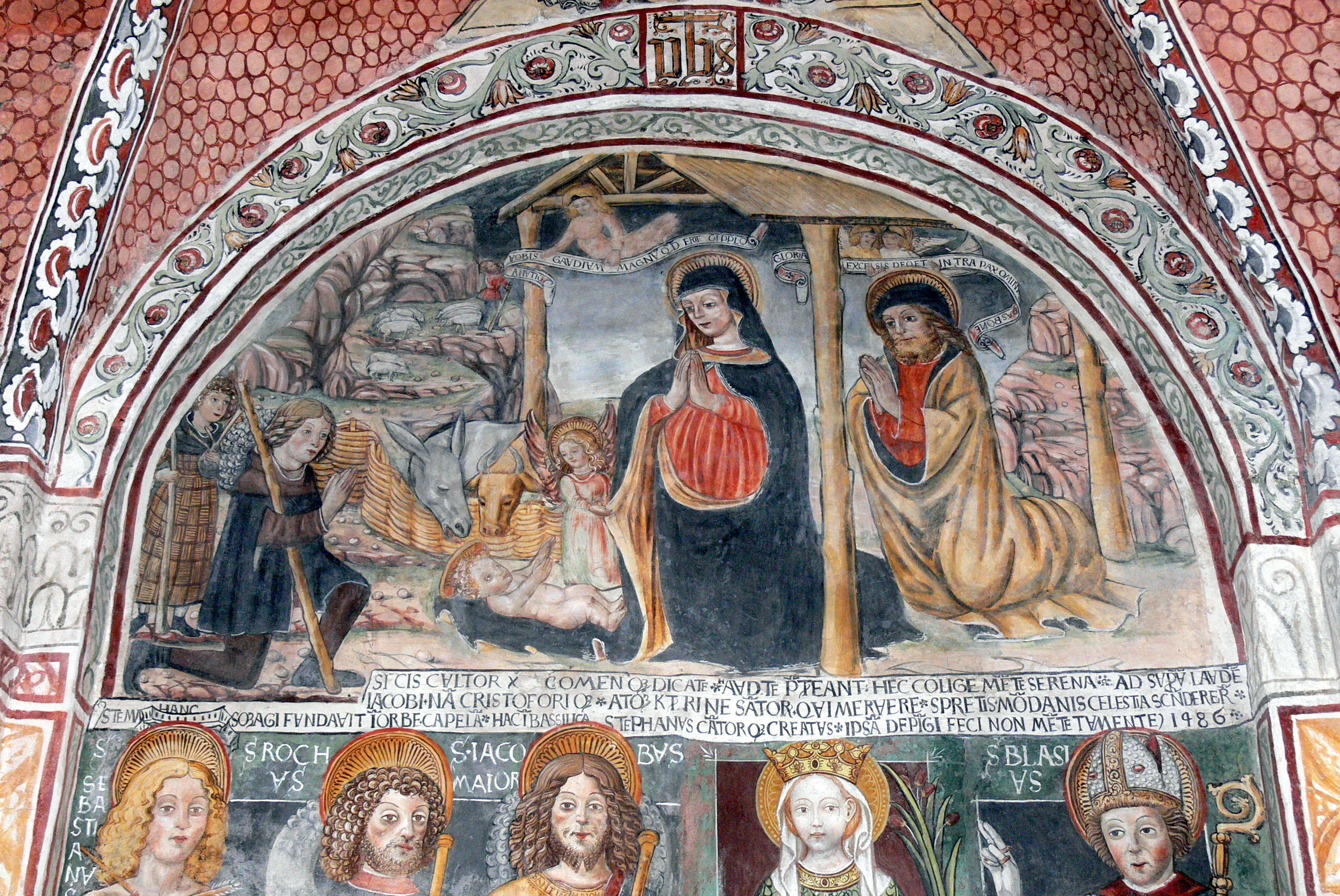
Tommaso Cagnola (?), Nativity, 1486

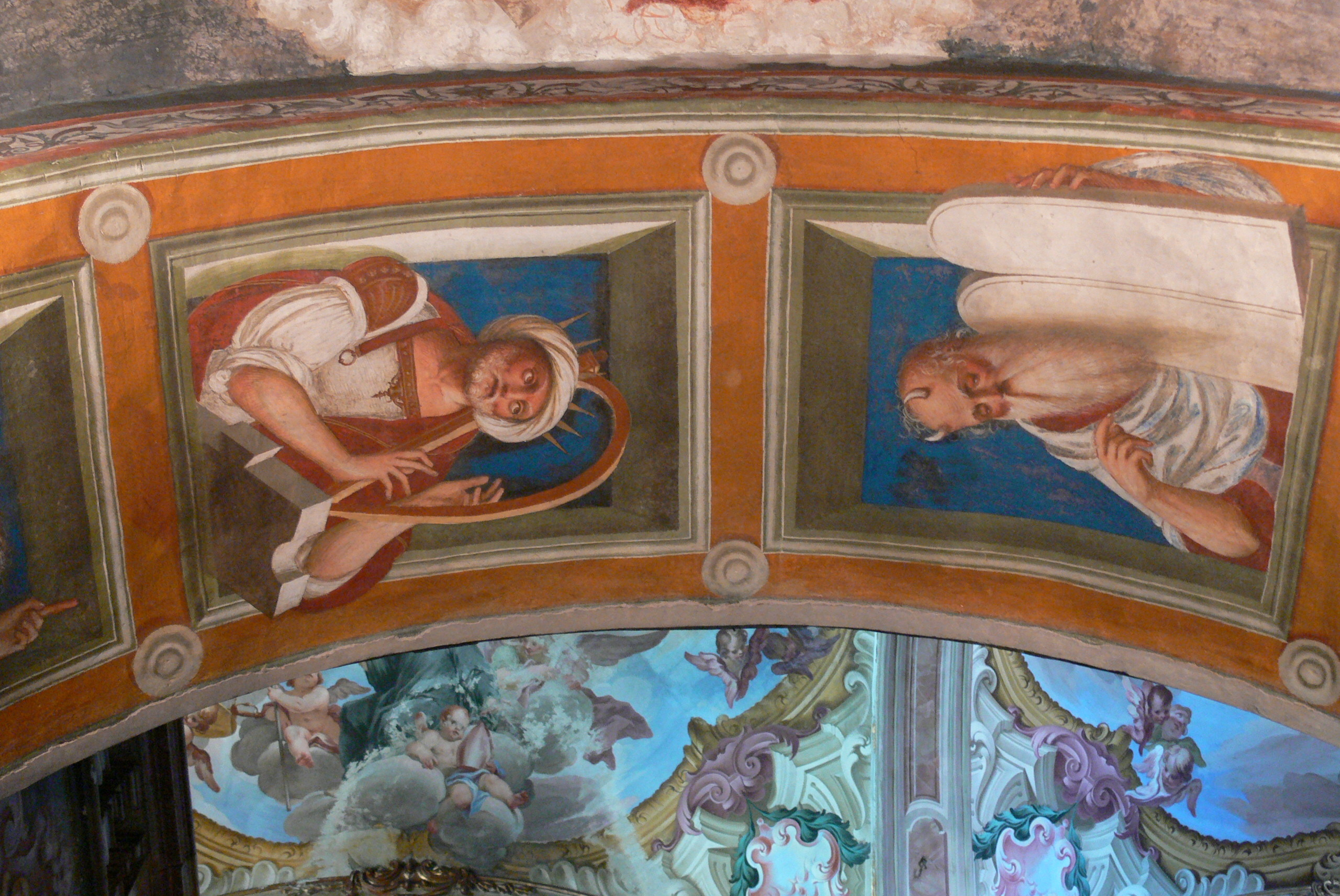
The prophets David and Moses

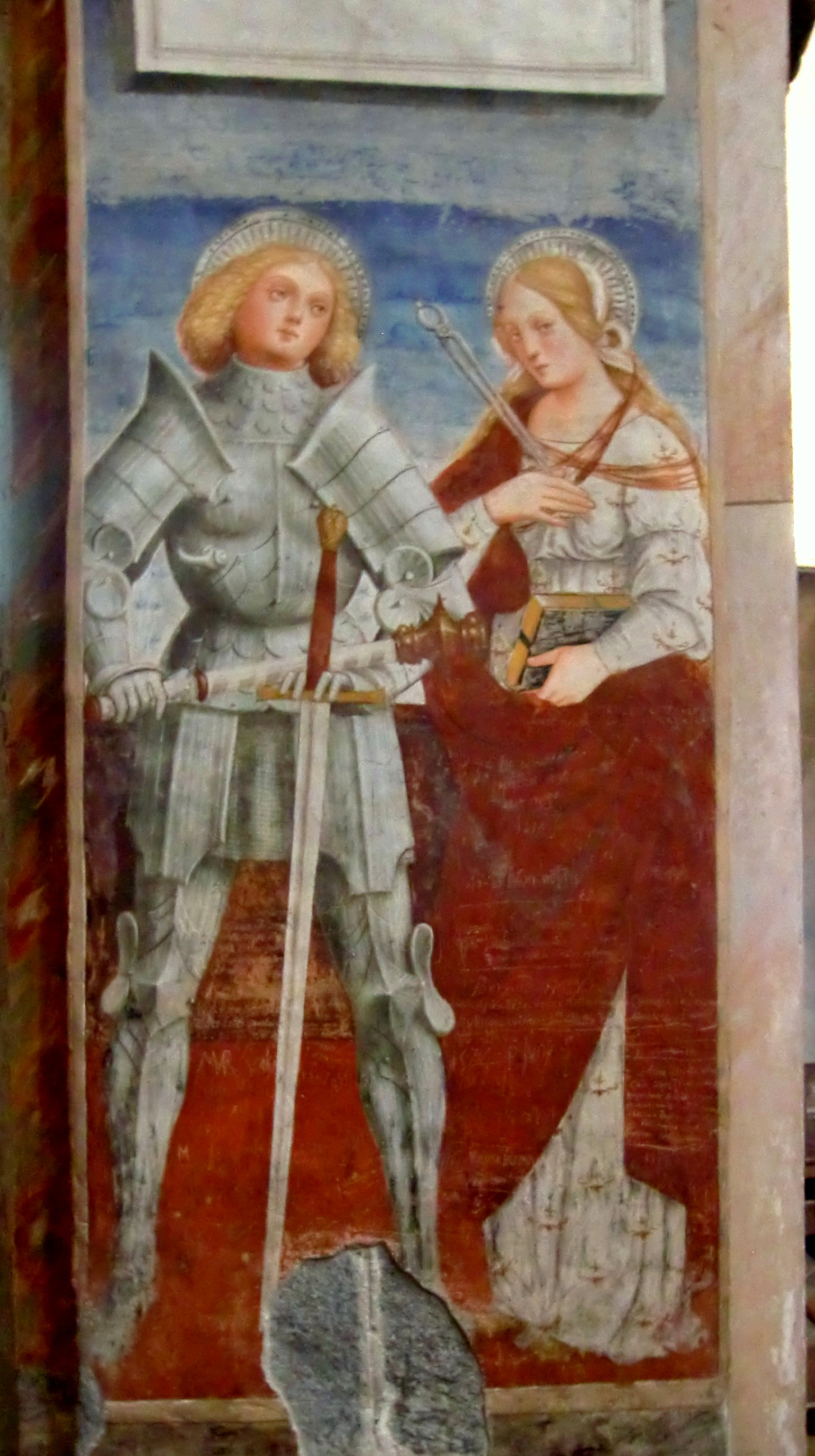
Saint Fermo and Saint Apollonia, left aisle pillar

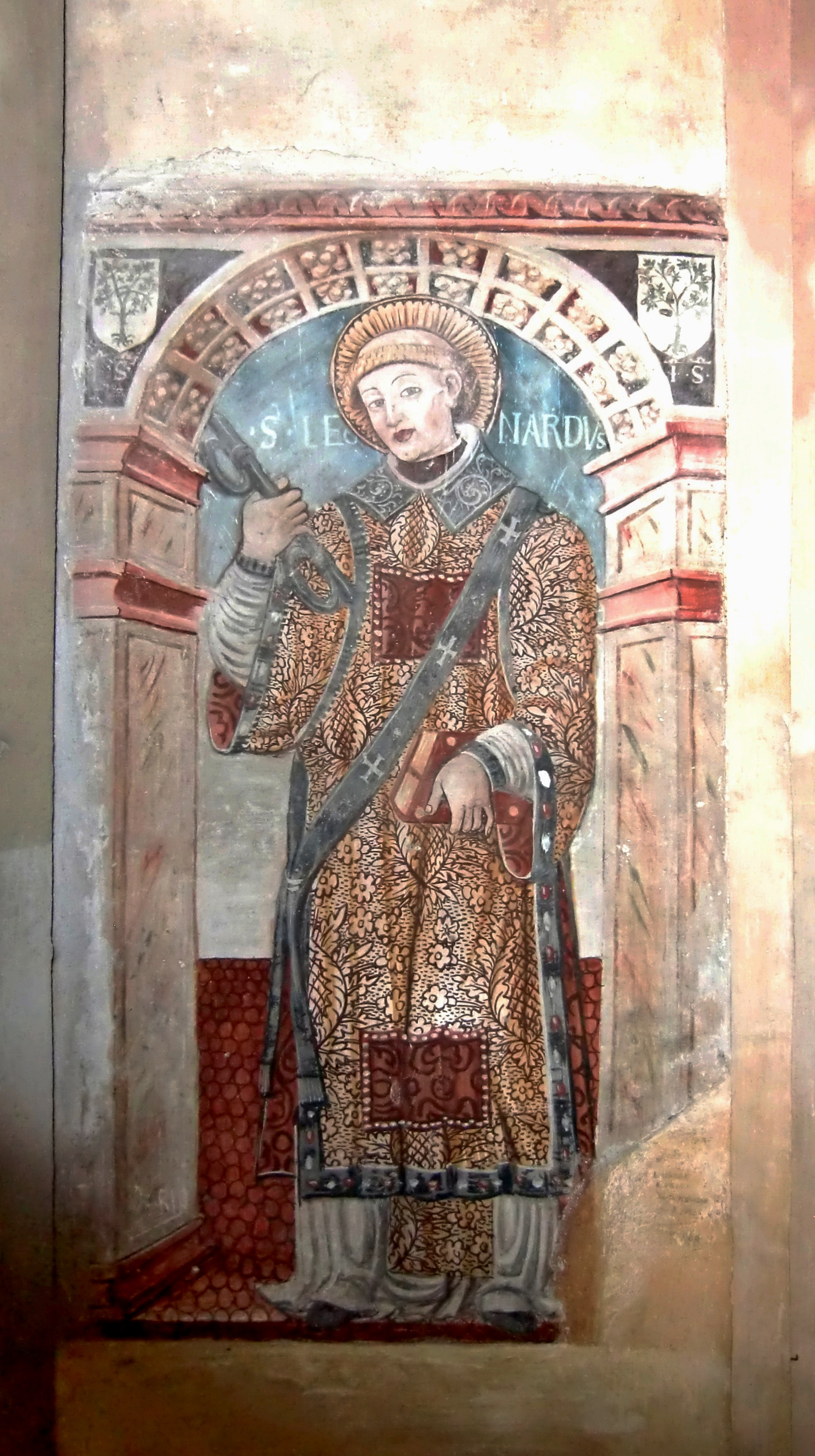
Cagnola's studio (?), Saint Leonard of Noblac

=== Pipe organ ===
Along the left wall of the central aisle there is the pipe organ made by Mascioni.

The instrument has two consoles, both with 58 notes keyboards and a 30 notes pedal keyboard.

== Sources ==
- M. Di Giovanni Madruzza "Isola di San Giulio", in G.A. Dell'Acqua, Isola San Giulio e Sacro Monte d'Orta, Istituto Bancario San Paolo, Turin, 1977
- Beatrice Canestro Chiovenda, L'isola di San Giulio sul lago d'Orta, Fondazione Arch. Enrico Monti, Milan, 1994
- AA.VV, L'arte romanica in Piemonte, Val d'Aosta e Liguria, Edizioni Angolo Manzoni, Turin, 2000, ISBN 88-86142-59-5, p. 273-6
- Anna Maria Cànopi OSB, Basilica di San Giulio. Abbazia Mater Ecclesiae, Editrice Velar, Gorle (Bergamo), 2009, ISBN 978-88-7135-433-0
- Luciano Viola " L'Abbazia di Fruttuaria ed il comune di san Benigno Canavese", "Volpiano dalla origini ad oggi", Volpiano

== See also ==
- CoEur - In the heart of European paths
- Path of Saint Charles
