= San Giulio, Barlassina =

Church building in Barlassina, Italy

Coordinates: 45°39′24″N 9°07′50″E

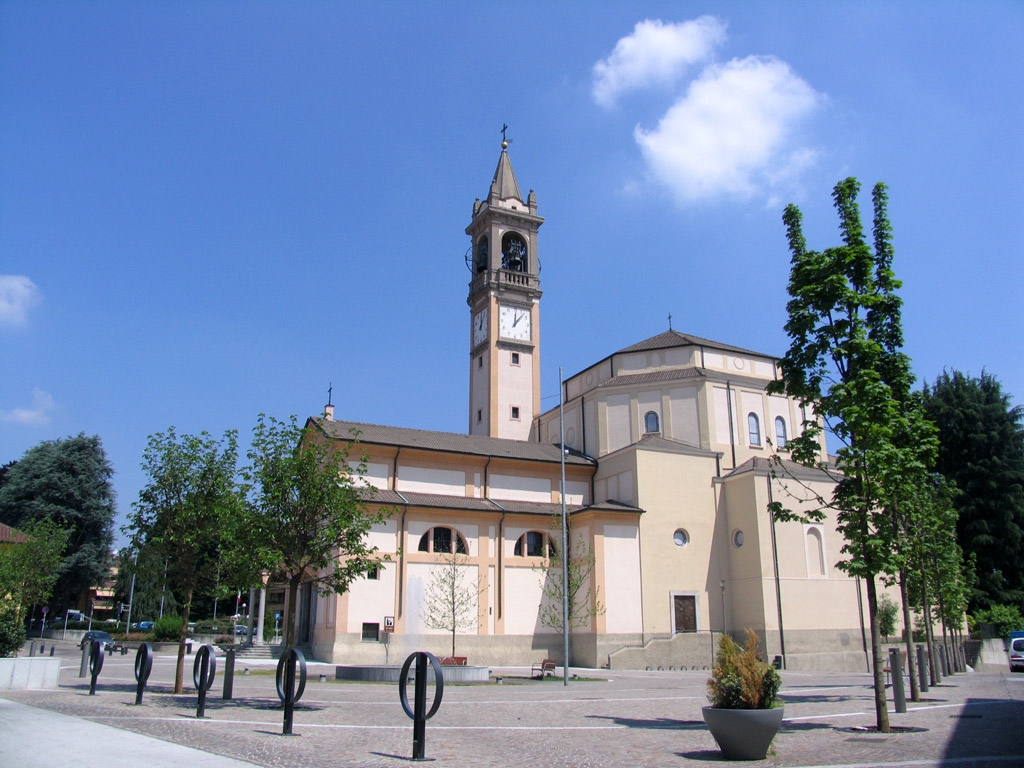
Side view of church and dome

San Giulio is a Roman Catholic basilica church located at Via Speroni #6 in Barlassina, province of Monza and Brianza, region of Lombardy, Italy.

== History ==
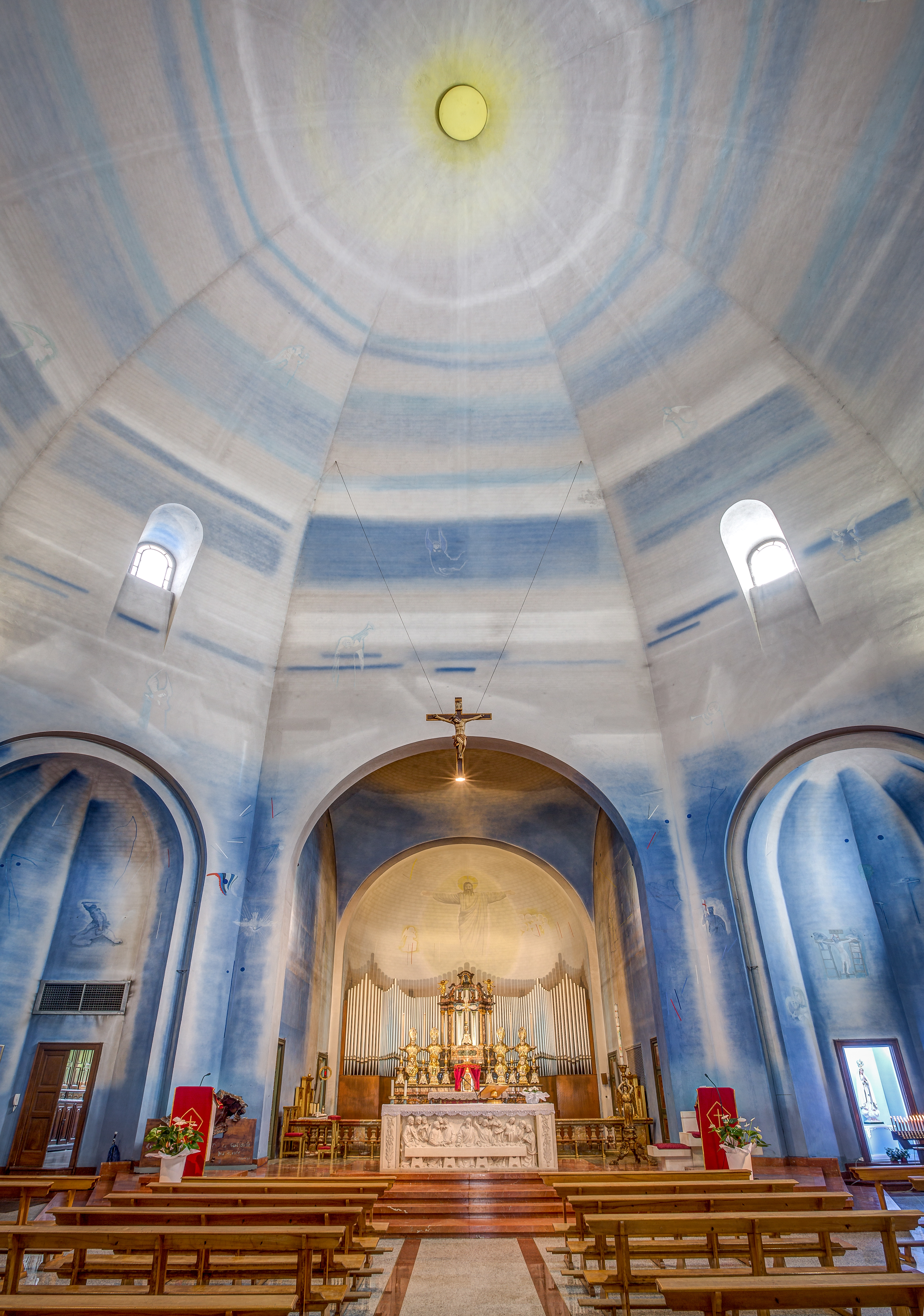
Abstract frescoes in dome painted by Vago

A church at the site, dedicated to St Julius of Lake Orta, is documented from the 13th century, but most of the present structure, including the large octagonal dome was erected in 1933 during a major expansion. The church is notable for the presence of frescoes by Bernardino Luini. The dome was frescoed by Valentino Vago.
