= Mother of the Church =

Catholic title for Mary

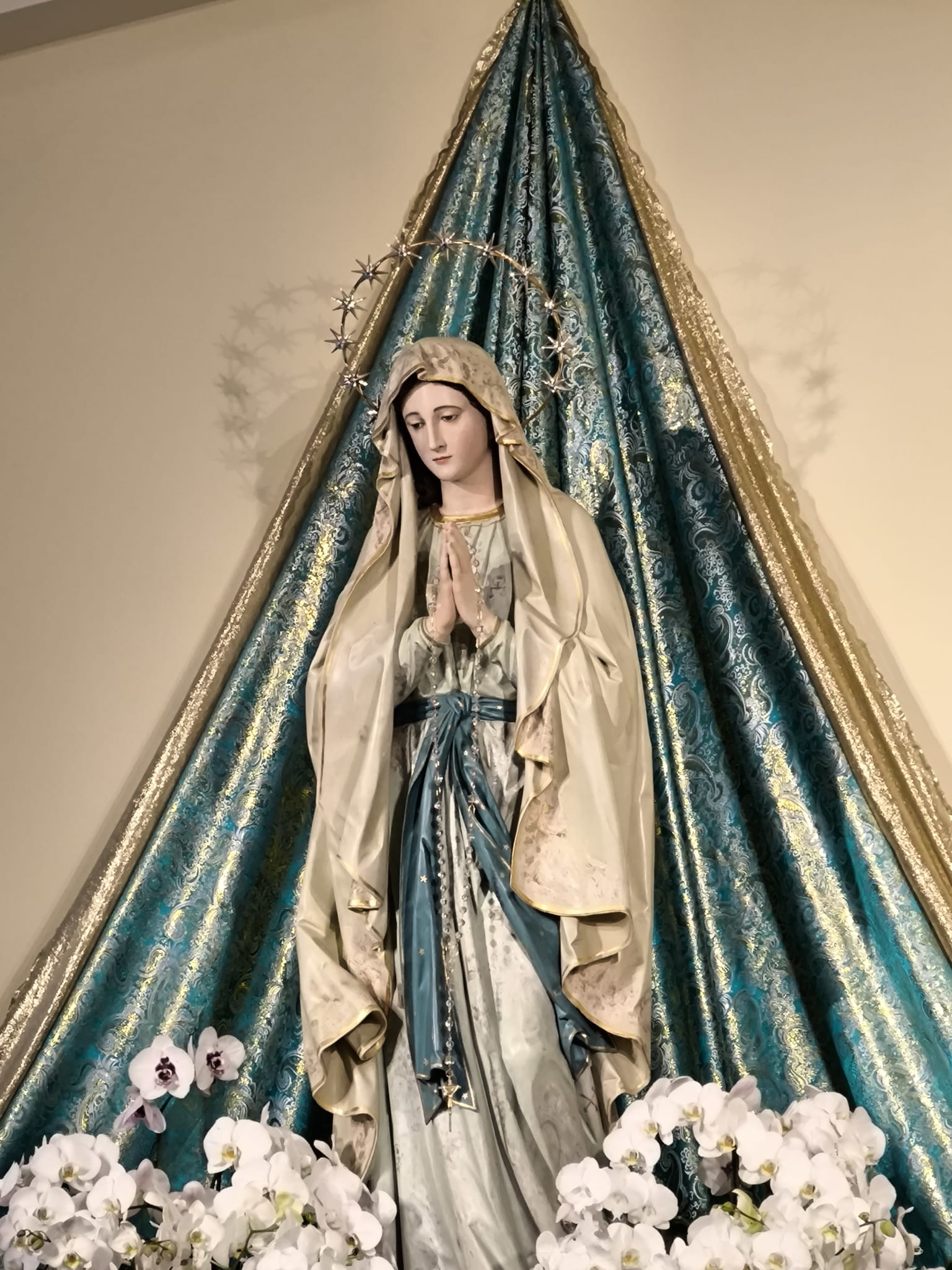
Statue of the Virgin Mary in St. Jacob church in Međugorje, Bosnia and Herzegovina

Mother of the Church (Latin: Mater Ecclesiae) is a title given to Mary in the Catholic Church, as officially declared by Pope Paul VI in 1964. The title first appeared in the 4th century writings of Saint Ambrose of Milan, as rediscovered by Hugo Rahner. It was also used by Pope Benedict XIV in 1748 and then by Pope Leo XIII in 1885. Pope John Paul II placed it in the Catechism of the Catholic Church, and Pope Francis inserted a memorial with the title "Mary, Mother of the Church" into the Roman Calendar, celebrated annually on Whit Monday, the day after Pentecost.

== St. Ambrose and Hugo Rahner ==
The Church has traditionally portrayed the Blessed Virgin Mary together with the apostles and disciples gathered at that first Pentecost, joined in prayer with the first members of the Church. The title Mater Ecclesiae is found in the writings of Berengaud, bishop of Treves (d. 1125). In the 1895 encyclical Adjutricem populi (Helper of the People) Pope Leo XIII wrote, "She is invoked as Mother of the Church and the teacher and Queen of the Apostles". Following the title's usage by Leo XIII, it was later used many times in the teachings of John XXIII and Paul VI, John Paul II and Benedict XVI.

The use of the Mater Ecclesiae title to the Virgin Mary goes back to Ambrose of Milan in the 4th century, but this was not known until its 1944 rediscovery by Hugo Rahner. Rahner's Mariology, following Ambrose, sees Mary in her role within the Church. His interpretation, based solely on Ambrose and the early Fathers, greatly influenced Vatican II and Pope Paul VI, who, quoting Ambrose, declared Mary the "Mother of the Church".

== Pope Paul VI ==
The Blessed Mother of God, the New Eve, Mother of the Church, continues in heaven her maternal role with regard to Christ's members, cooperating with the birth and growth of divine life in the souls of the redeemed. – Pope Paul VI's "Credo of the People of God".

A former archbishop of Milan, Paul VI used similar language to that of Saint Ambrose of Milan, calling Mary Model of the Church in light of her faith, love and complete unity with Christ and Mother of the Church because she gave birth to Christ. During his speech upon the closing of the third session of the Second Vatican Council on November 21, 1964, Paul VI said: "We declare Mary Most Holy Mother of the Church, that is, of all the Christian people."

In Redemptoris Mater, Pope John Paul II referred to Paul VI's "Credo of the People of God" as a reaffirmation of the statement that Mary is the "mother of the entire Christian people, both faithful and pastors" and wrote that the Credo "restated this truth in an even more forceful way".

== Pope John Paul II ==
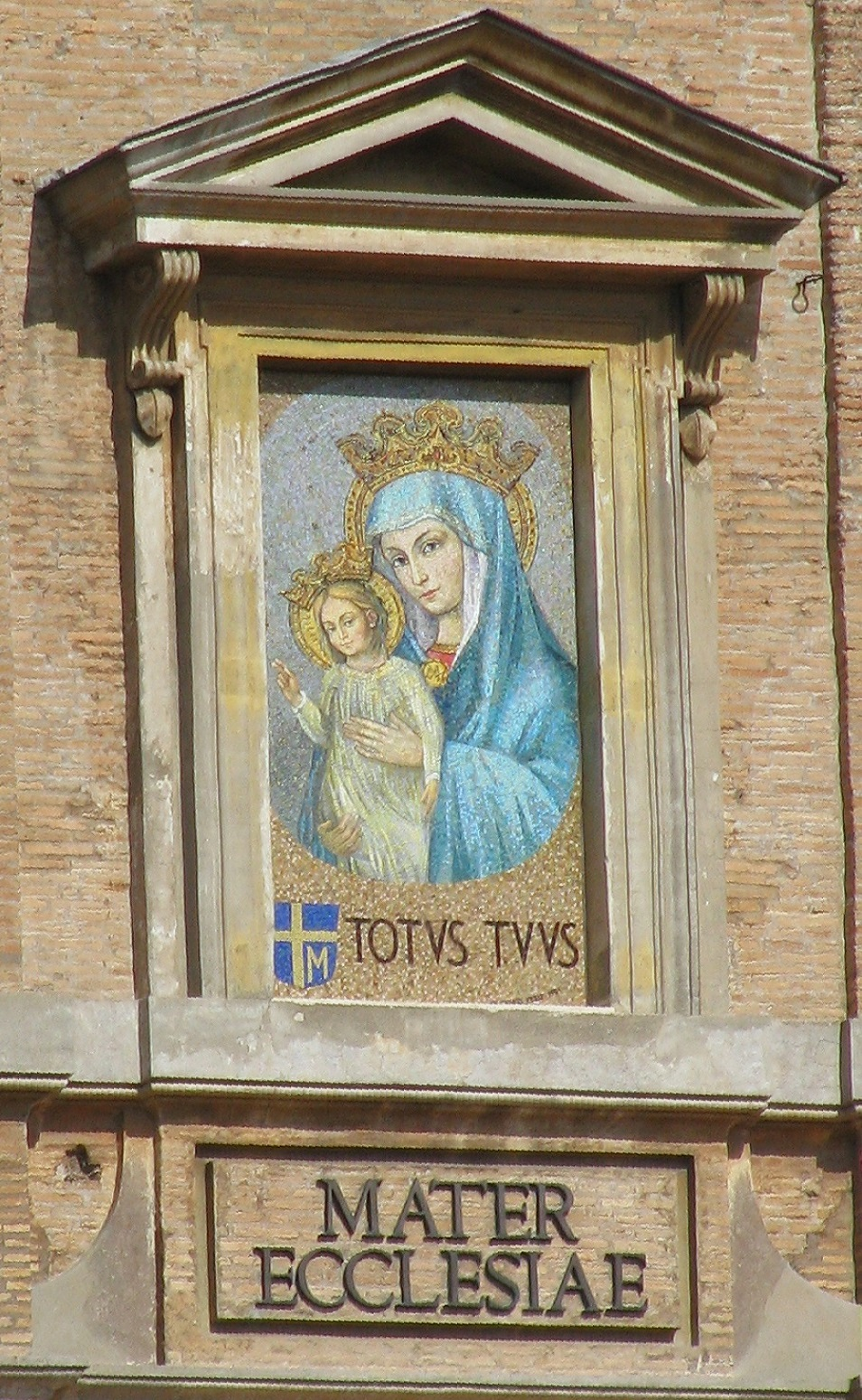
Mosaic of Mater Ecclesiae in St. Peter's Square. The mosaic bears the personal arms and motto of Pope John Paul II, who approved the installation of the image and blessed it personally.

In 1980, during the UNIV Forum, an annual gathering of university students from all over the world held in Rome during Holy Week and born by inspiration of Saint Josemaría Escrivá, founder of Opus Dei, a young man taking part in the gathering told Pope John Paul II that he was not able to find an image of Our Lady in St. Peter's Square, considered the heart of Christendom. In fact, although there are 162 statues of saints, none of them depict the Mother of God. The pope answered immediately: "then we should finish the square". When Blessed Álvaro del Portillo, successor of Saint Josemaría Escrivá, heard this story, he asked the Spanish architect Javier Cotelo to find a good solution for the image. In July 1980 and January 1981, Cotelo submitted to the pope a proposal of using one of the windows of the building located between St. Peter's Square and the Cortile di San Damaso, since from there the image could be seen from any part of the square. The pope accepted the suggestion and on December 7, 1981, a mosaic of Maria Mater Ecclesiae ("Our Lady, Mother of the Church") was installed following Cotelo's proposal. On the following day, the Feast of the Immaculate Conception, the pope blessed the mosaic from his window; this mosaic is considered to be last stone of St. Peter's Square. Moreover, this mosaic overlooks the spot on the square where an assassination attempt on Pope John Paul II was made in 1981. It is thus also considered a tribute to the intercession of Mary in saving his life.

In 1987, John Paul repeated this title Mother of the Church in his encyclical Redemptoris Mater and at a general audience on September 17, 1997.

With regard to the title "Mother of the Church", John Paul used Redemptoris Mater as an opportunity to explain how the Blessed Virgin Mary's maternity of Christ's faithful derives from her maternity of Christ, as well as how Mary serves as a "type", or model, of the Church as a whole.

Mary is present in the Church as the Mother of Christ, and at the same time as that Mother whom Christ, in the mystery of the Redemption, gave to humanity in the person of the Apostle John. Thus, in her new motherhood in the Spirit, Mary embraces each and every one in the Church, and embraces each and every one through the Church. In this sense Mary, Mother of the Church, is also the Church's model. Indeed, as Paul VI hopes and asks, the Church must draw "from the Virgin Mother of God the most authentic form of perfect imitation of Christ."

On September 17, 1997, Pope John Paul II devoted a Wednesday general audience to the title "Mother of the Church" with regard to its application to the Blessed Virgin Mary.

The faithful first called upon Mary with the title "Mother of God", "Mother of the faithful" or "our Mother" to emphasize her personal relationship with each of her children. Later, because of the greater attention paid to the mystery of the Church and to Mary’s relationship to her, the Blessed Virgin began more frequently to be invoked as "Mother of the Church"."

The title "Mother of the Church" thus reflects the deep conviction of the Christian faithful, who see in Mary not only the mother of the person of Christ, but also of the faithful.

== Pope Benedict XVI ==
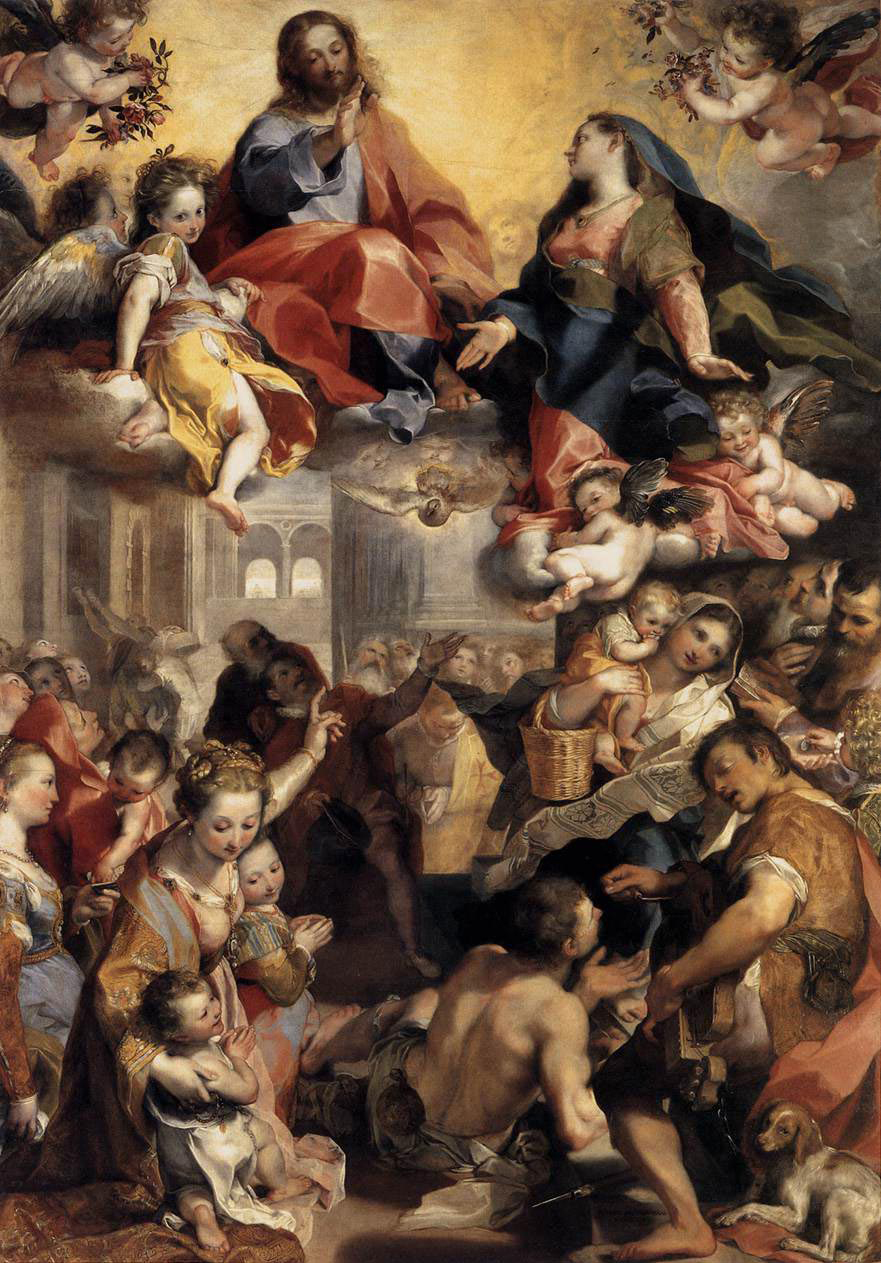
Madonna del Popolo (Madonna of the people) by Federico Barocci, 1579

Pope Benedict XVI referred to the Credo of Paul VI and stated that it sums up all of the scriptural texts that relate to the matter.

Benedict addresses the issue of how Roman Catholic Mariology is related to ecclesiology, the teaching about the Church. On first sight, he argues, it may seem accidental, that the Council moved Mariology into ecclesiology. This relation helps to understand what "Church" really is. The theologian Hugo Rahner showed that Mariology was originally ecclesiology. The Church is like Mary. The Church is virgin and mother, she is immaculate and carries the burdens of history. She suffers and she is assumed into heaven. Slowly she learns, that Mary is her mirror, that she is a person in Mary. Mary on the other hand is not an isolated individual, who rests in herself. She is carrying the mystery of the Church.

== Pope Francis ==
In 2018, Pope Francis decreed that the Memorial of the Blessed Virgin Mary, Mother of the Church be inserted into the Roman Calendar on the Monday after Pentecost (also known as Whit Monday) and to be celebrated every year, outranking even obligatory memorials. The decree, which was signed on 11 February 2018, the memorial of Our Lady of Lourdes, on the 160th anniversary of the Lourdes apparitions, was issued on March 3, 2018. It states that the celebration aims to

Help us to remember that growth in the Christian life must be anchored to the Mystery of the Cross, to the oblation of Christ in the Eucharistic Banquet and to the Mother of the Redeemer and Mother of the Redeemed, the Virgin who makes her offering to God.

== See also ==
- Catholic Mariology
- Mater Ecclesiae Abbey, Benedictine abbey in Italy
- Mater Ecclesiae Monastery, monastery in the Vatican City
- Rosa Mystica
- Titles of Mary, mother of Jesus
