= Mater Ecclesiae Abbey =

- Abbazia Mater Ecclesiae
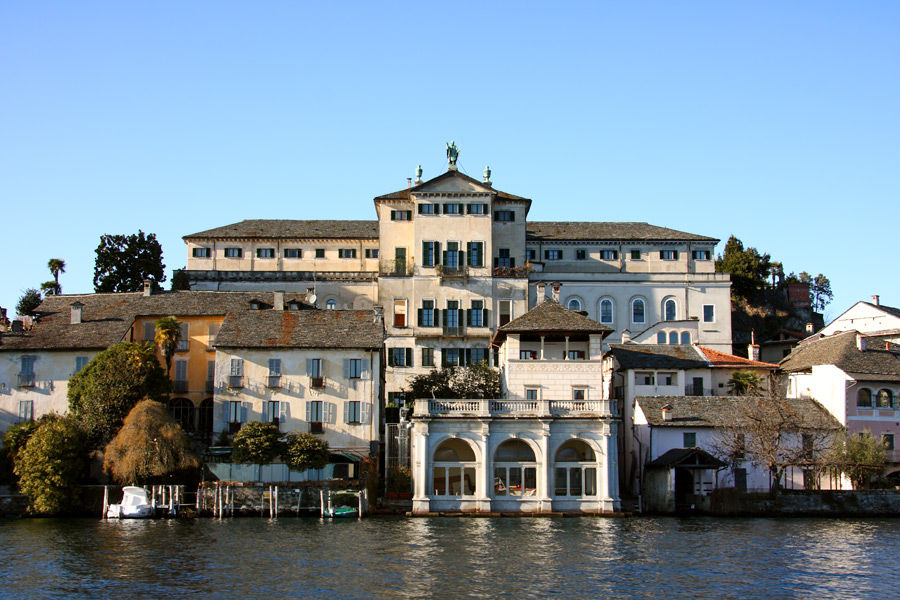
- A view of the abbey from Lake Orta
- Interactive map of Mater Ecclesiae Abbey

Monastery information
- Order: Benedictines
- Established: 1973
- Mother house: Viboldone Abbey
- Dedication: Mary, Mother of the Church
- Diocese: Abbey nullius

People
- Founders: Mother Anna Maria Canopi, O.S.B.
- Abbess: Mother Anna Maria Canopi, O.S.B

Architecture
- Status: active

Site
- Location: I-28016 Orta San Giulio, Novara, Italy
- Coordinates: 45.7963°N 8.3999°E

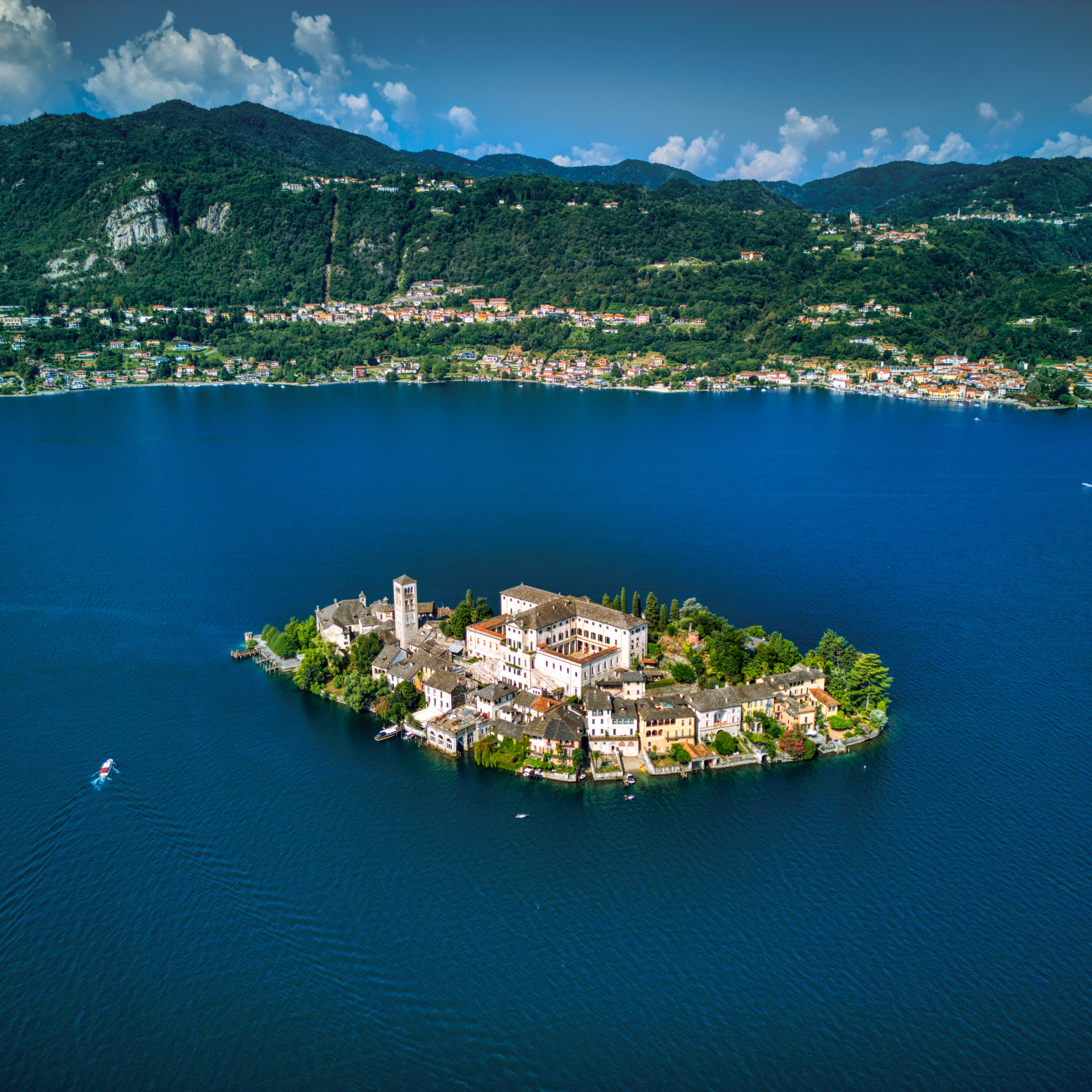
Mater Ecclesiae Abbey situated on San Giulio Island in Lake Orta

Mater Ecclesiae (Mother of the Church) Abbey (Italian: Abbazia Mater Ecclesiae) is an Italian Benedictine territorial abbey of nuns founded in 1973. The abbey is located on Lake Orta in northern Italy, considered one of the most scenic sites in the country.

== History ==
By 1973, the community of Benedictine nuns of the Abbey of Viboldone, near Milan, which had been established in 1941 to care for the needy children of wartime Italy, had grown to the point that they considered opening a new foundation. They were offered the facilities of the former bishop's residence on San Giulio Island for this, which they accepted.

Six nuns were chosen to undertake this enterprise, under the direction of Mother Anna Maria Cànopi, O.S.B., who was appointed as the first prioress of the new monastery. Within fifteen years the small community had expanded so much that new quarters were needed. They then transferred to the former diocesan seminary in the centre of the little island, which was a massive complex built around 1840. At that time, the monastery was raised to the status of an abbey, with Cànopi being elected as the community's first abbess.

The community had grown to over 80 members by 1989, and it was decided to establish a new foundation. For this site, they chose the village of Saint-Oyen, in the Aosta Valley, where they opened the Monastery of Regina Pacis (Latin for Queen of Peace). As of 2006, they numbered about fifteen nuns.

The community of Mater Ecclesiae has continued to flourish and today numbers about 100 nuns.

== Crafts ==
The nuns of Mater Ecclesiae Abbey support themselves through their work in creating and repairing liturgical vestments and accessories, in writing icons and making translations from German and French spiritual books. Through their research, they have developed a reputation for the quality of their restoration work with antique items.

Additionally, Cànopi, the abbess, has become a noted spiritual writer.
