= Julius of Novara =

Missionary priest to northern Italy

Saint Julius of Novara
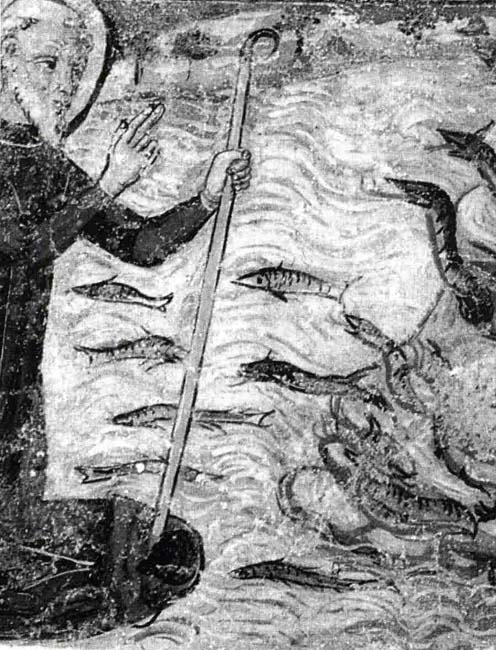
- Died: 401 AD
- Venerated in: Roman Catholic Church; Orthodox Church
- Major shrine: Isola San Giulio
- Feast: 31 January
- Attributes: old priest with his staff, sailing on his cloak to Isola Giulio over a lake which is full of serpents

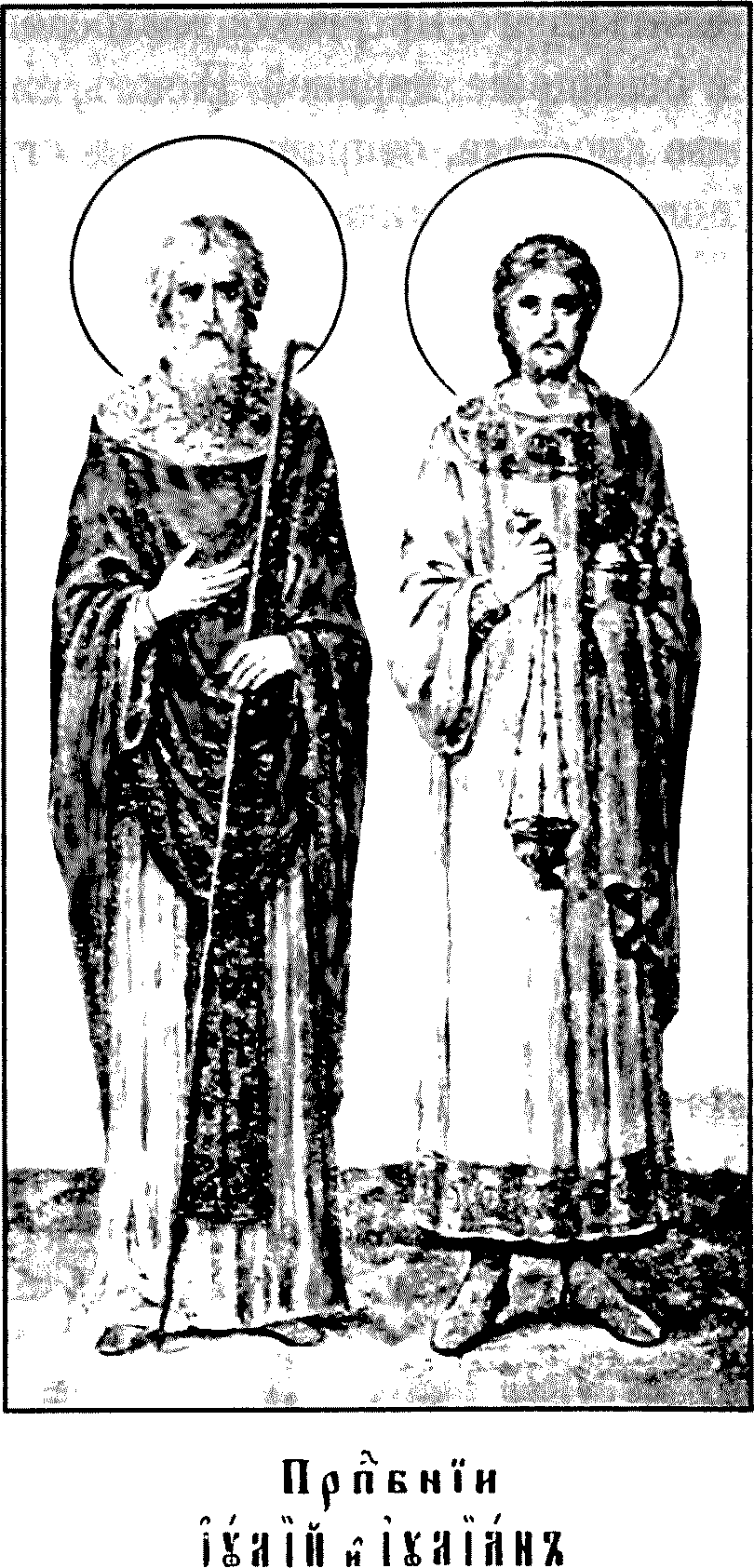

Julius of Novara (Italian: Giulio di Orta), also Julius of Aegina (died 401 AD) was a missionary priest to northern Italy.

His cult is centred at Lake Orta in the Novarese highlands, and in particular on the island which has been named for him since at least the eighth century, Isola San Giulio, where his presumed relics are preserved in the crypt, called scurolo, of a basilica dedicated to him.

Few facts are known about his career. In the earliest Vita, which dates from no earlier than the eighth century and is of a character as much legendary as historical, the account of his life is interlaced with that of his brother Julian (Giuliano), a deacon whose name is similar enough to suggest that they may have been the same person, but now we know (thanks to recent archaeological finds in Gozzano's previous parish church, S. Lorenzo) that they both existed. The Roman Martyrology commemorates only Julius. It has been said that Julius' name was recited as part of the Ambrosian Rite during the fifth and sixth centuries; however, it has also been claimed that this Julius referred to Pope Julius I.

Julius and Julian may have been Greeks who came to Rome before establishing themselves at Lake Orta. Their legend states that they were educated in the Christian faith by their parents. They are said to have been ordered by Theodosius I to destroy pagan altars and sacred woods and to build Christian churches. They built one hundred churches, according to their tradition. The ninety-ninth church is said to have been built at Gozzano, and dedicated to Saint Lawrence. Julian was buried there. The hundredth church was built by Julius on the island that bears his name; he dedicated it to Saints Peter and Paul.

== Sources ==
- San Giulio: Apostolo dell'Alto Novarese (in Italian)
- Saints of January 31: Julius of Novara
