= San Giulio Island =

Island in Italy

Coordinates: 45.796191°N 8.399743°E

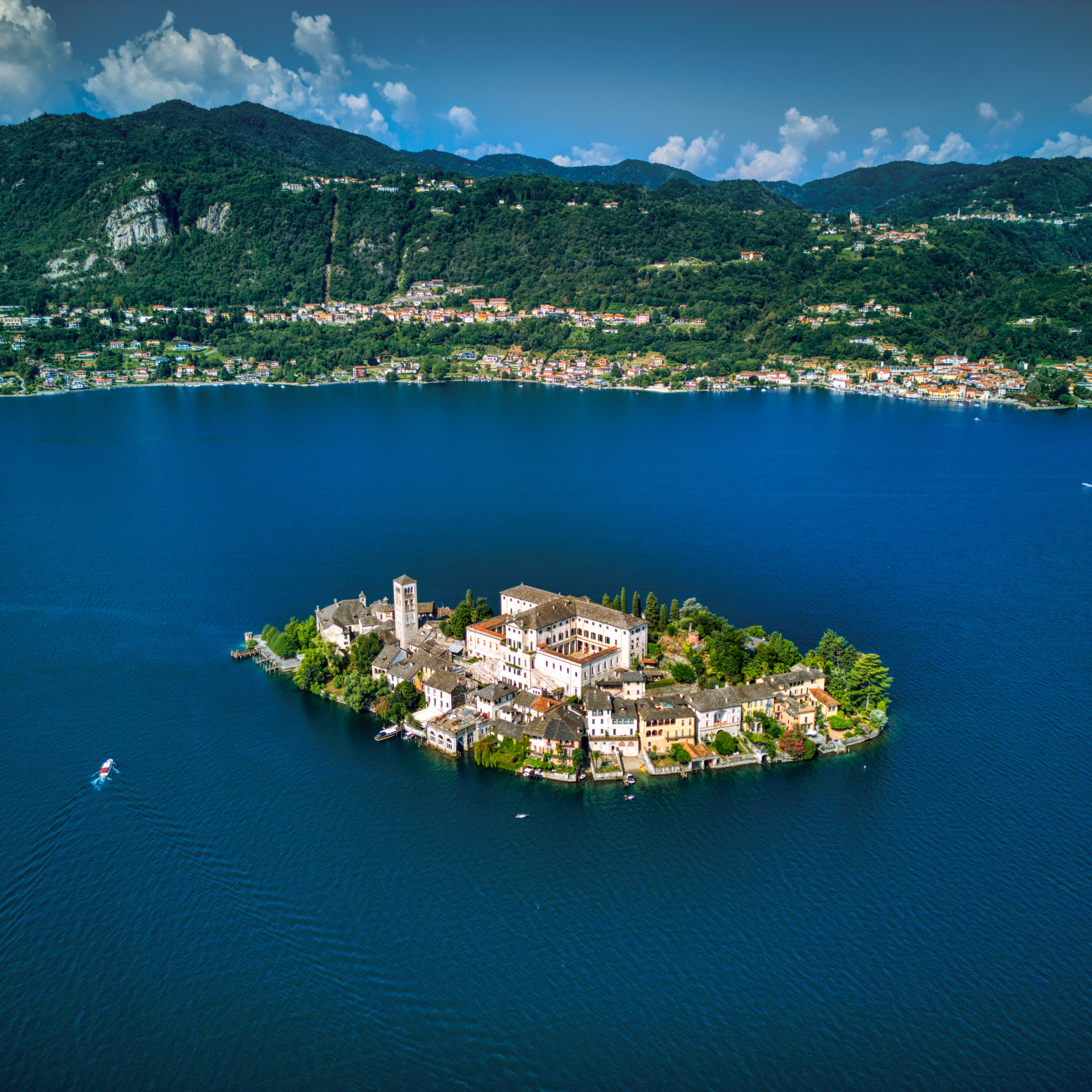
San Giulio Island

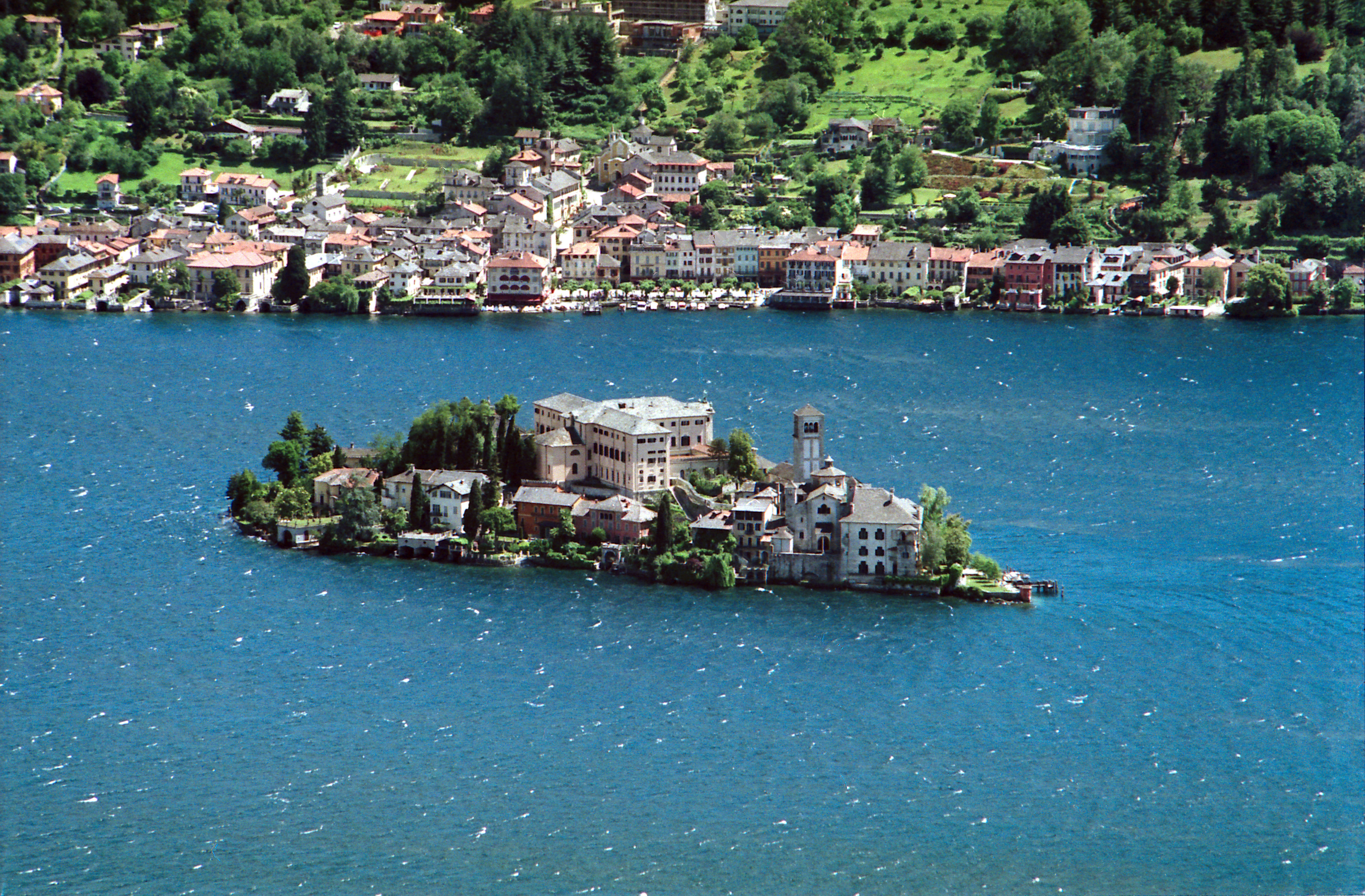
San Giulio Island, with Orta San Giulio behind

San Giulio Island or St. Julius Island (Italian: Isola di San Giulio) is the only island within Lake Orta in Piedmont, northwestern Italy. The most famous building on the island is the Basilica di San Giulio, close to which is the monumental old seminary (1840s). Since 1976, it has been transformed into a Benedictine monastery.

== Geography ==
The island is 275 m (902 ft) long (north/south) and is 140 m (459 ft) wide (east/west). The little island, just west of the lakeshore village of Orta San Giulio, has very picturesque buildings and takes its name from a local patron saint (Julius of Novara), who lived in the second half of the 4th century. The Church of San Giulio, Castellanza, which is located in Castellanza, Varese, northern Italy, was named after the island.

The island is inhabited permanently by a few families, and the most historically relevant buildings are the Basilica di San Giulio and the Mater Ecclesiae Abbey. Most of the houses on the island are holiday houses or second homes.

== History ==
The human presence dates back to the Neolithic and the Iron Age. According to the legend of Julius of Novara's life, during the Roman period, the island was abandoned. It is possible, though, that the island was a pre-Christian cultural centre. This would explain why Julius of Novara decided to build here the first church. In the 5th century, a small chapel (oratory) was erected on the island, probably to commemorate the evangelizer Saint Julius, who had died there. According to tradition, Onorato, 7th bishop of Novara, acknowledged the strategic position of the island as a defensive bulwark against a possible invader from the Sempione. From archaeological finds, it is known that a new, larger church already existed in the 6th century: here Filacrio, the bishop of Novara, asked to be buried. Around the same time, an octagonal building - probably a baptistery - was erected in the middle of the island. In the XI century the island was described by Arnulf of Milan as inexpugnabile municipium.

In the Lombard period, the island had a fortress and, according to Paul the Deacon, Duke Mimulfo lived and died here in 590. For more than four centuries there is no mention of the island, but it is mentioned in 957 when Berengar II escaped here with his son Adalbert. They were besieged by Liudolf, and Berengar II was defeated; but with the death of Liudolf, Berengar regained control until the conquest of Pavia by Otto the Great in 961. Berengar withdrew to the Fortress of San Leo, while his wife Willa withdrew to the island, bringing with her all the treasures in the palace of Pavia. Waiting for a siege, she improved the fortifications, whose large walls were called "Queen Willa's walls". The siege began in May 962, and it lasted two months. After defeating Willa, Otto II seized the treasures, but let the queen reunite with her husband in San Leo. The religious reformer William of Volpiano (Saint William of Dijon) was born on the island in 962, in the fortified castle located on the island. The island was inherited by Frederick Barbarossa through his mother, heiress to Saxon and Bavarian emperors.

In the 12th century, a new Romanesque basilica was built, thus altering the previous one to some extent.

During the XVIII century, the Novara area passed under the rule of the Kingdom of Sardinia and in September 1767 the inhabitants of the Riviera di San Giulio pledged allegiance to the king in the Bishop's Palace on the island. Novara bishops kept their administrative role on the territory with the title of "Principi di San Giulio e d'Orta" until 1817, losing definitely their privileges in 1819. In 1841, the medieval castle was destroyed to make way for the new bishop's seminary.

A pedestrian road runs along the perimeter of the island. One of the houses belonged to Cesare Augusti Tallone, a famous Italian luthier. Along the road, aphorisms about silence and meditation can be found.

== Cinema ==
The island of San Giulio was chosen as the set for The Correspondence by Giuseppe Tornatore.
