= Charles Rouen =

Belgian historian and soldier

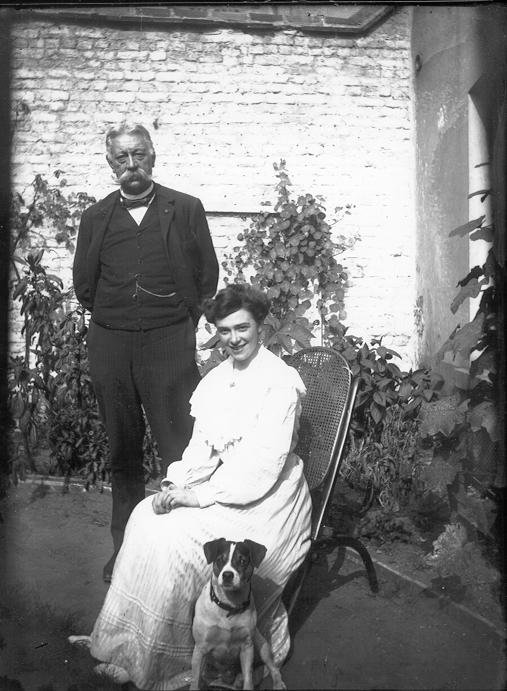
General Rouen accompanied by his niece Louise van Dievoet and the dog Jack, c. 1900

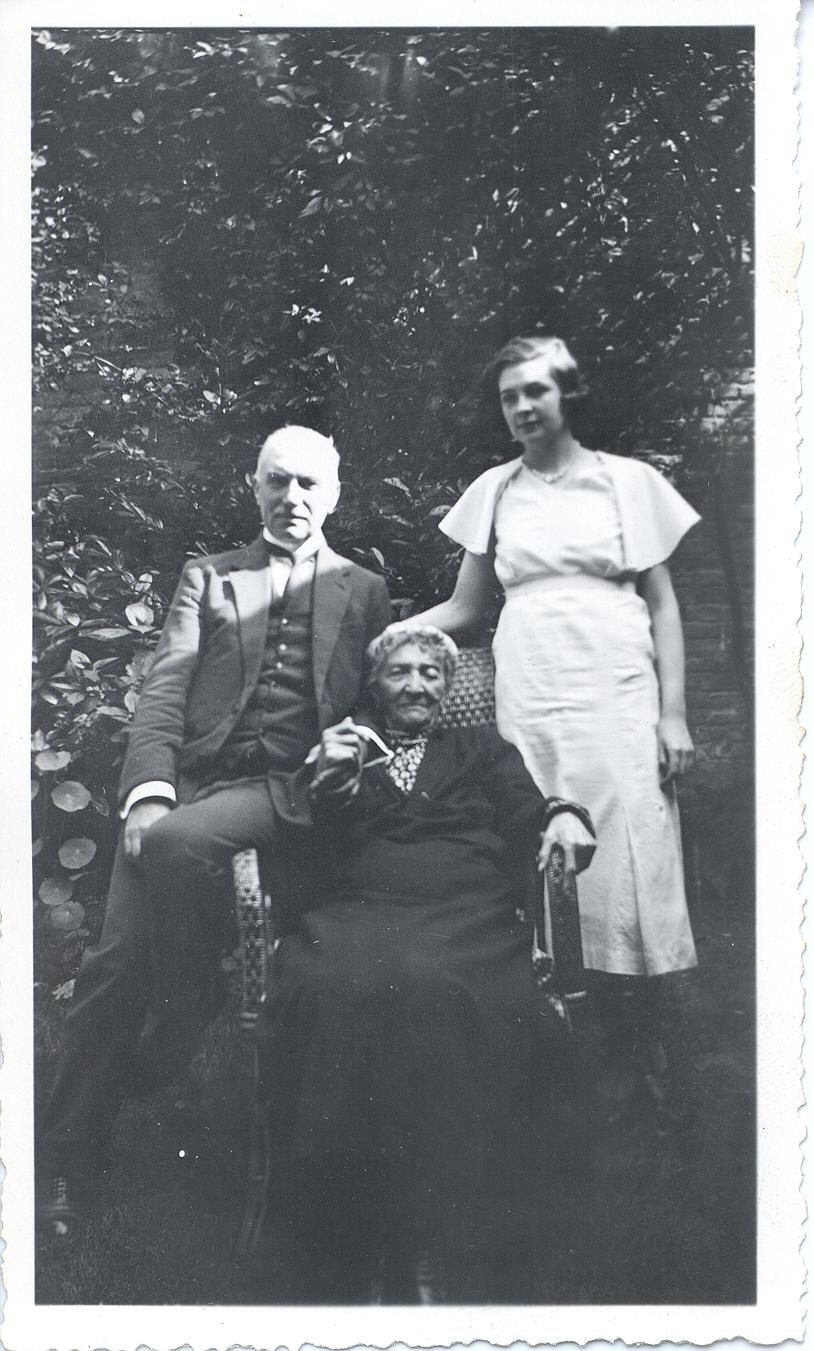
The wife of General Rouen acompagnied by her nephew Gabriel Van Dievoet and her little-niece Andrée Gachassin-Lafite, c. 1921

General Charles Auguste Jean Baptiste Rouen (9 July 1838 – after 1917) was a Belgian historian and soldier.

Rouen was born in Antwerp. In Brussels on 30 April 1862, he married Joséphine Pétronille Straatman, daughter of ship-owner Lambert Straatman and Marie Sophie Fautier. He was the son of Guillaume Rouen, a Belgian hero of the Battle of Waterloo and revolutionary, and Henriette Elius. Rouen was the brother-in-law of General Jean Prosper Beaudrihaye, who married Anne Caroline Straatman, his wife's sister.

== Career ==
Rouen was a Colonel of the Grenadiers (1891), general lieutenant with the section of activity (1901), member of the committee of staff, and member of the council of improvement of the establishments of reserve training. He also performed a mission at the time of the Italian War of Independence.

== Publications and illustrations ==
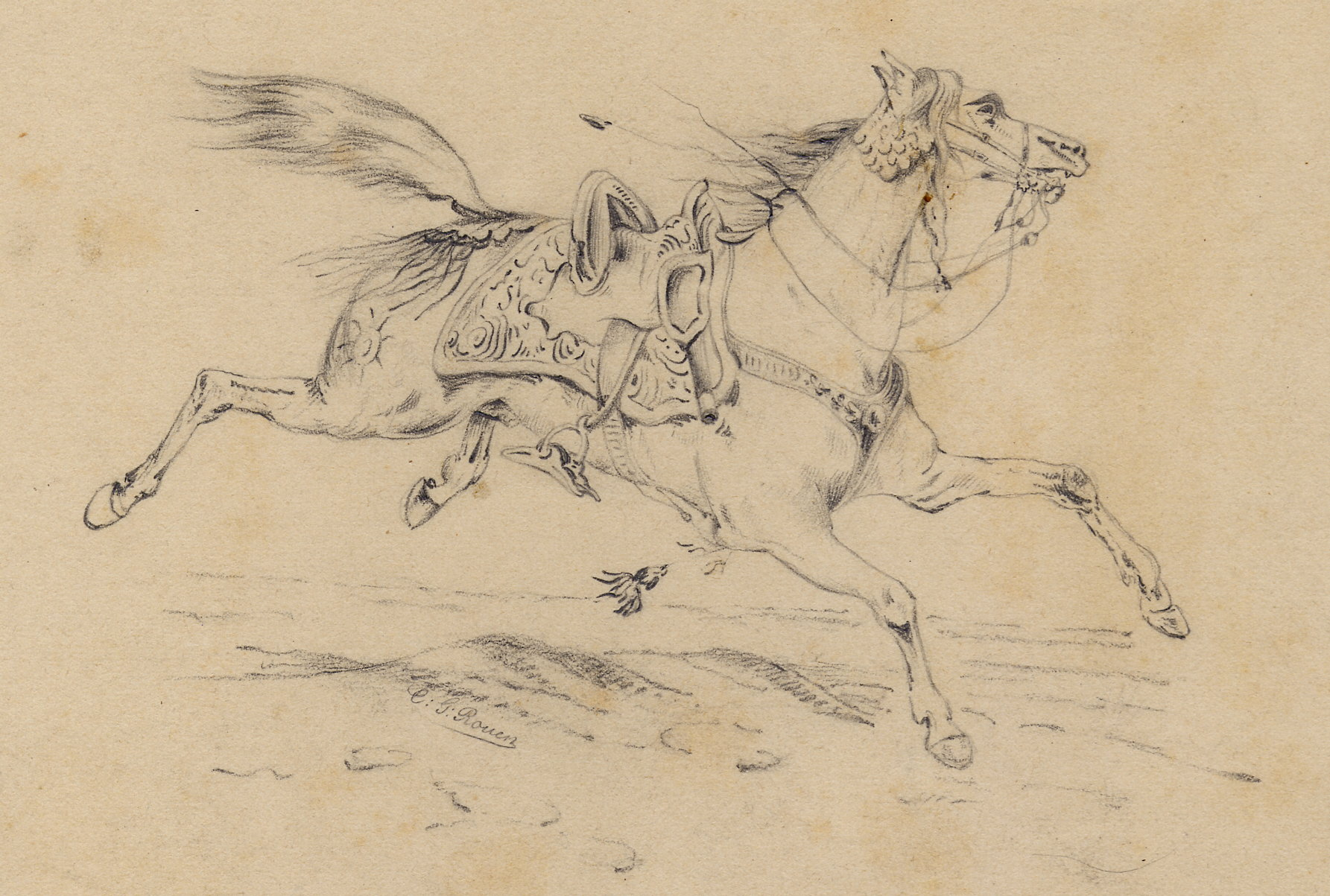
Horse, drawing of general Rouen

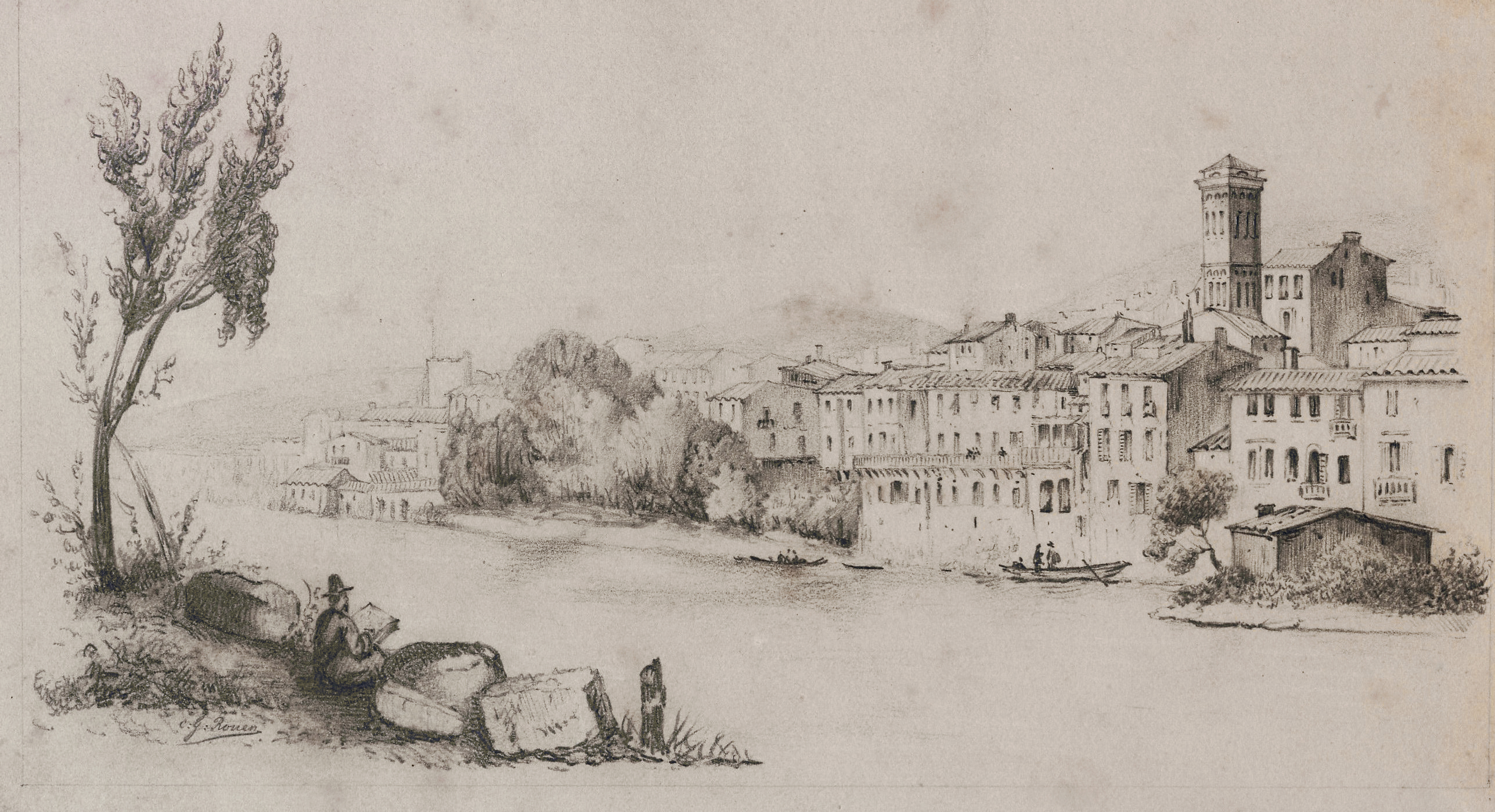
Veduta of the town Orta San Giulio, drawing by general Rouen, c. 1868

Rouen authored works concerning military history and the art of war, but is mainly known for his 1896 book, The Belgian Army. Exposed historical of its organization, its costumes and uniforms, its armament and its tactic since primitive times until our days. This book was to contain a second volume, but the bankruptcy of the editor prevented its publication. This book is sought by amateur collectors of costumes and military figurines for its illustrations (also by Rouen). Rouen was also a draftsman.
