= Sanctuary of Madonna del Sasso =

Church in Lake Orta, Italy

Coordinates: 45.7917°N 8.3686°E

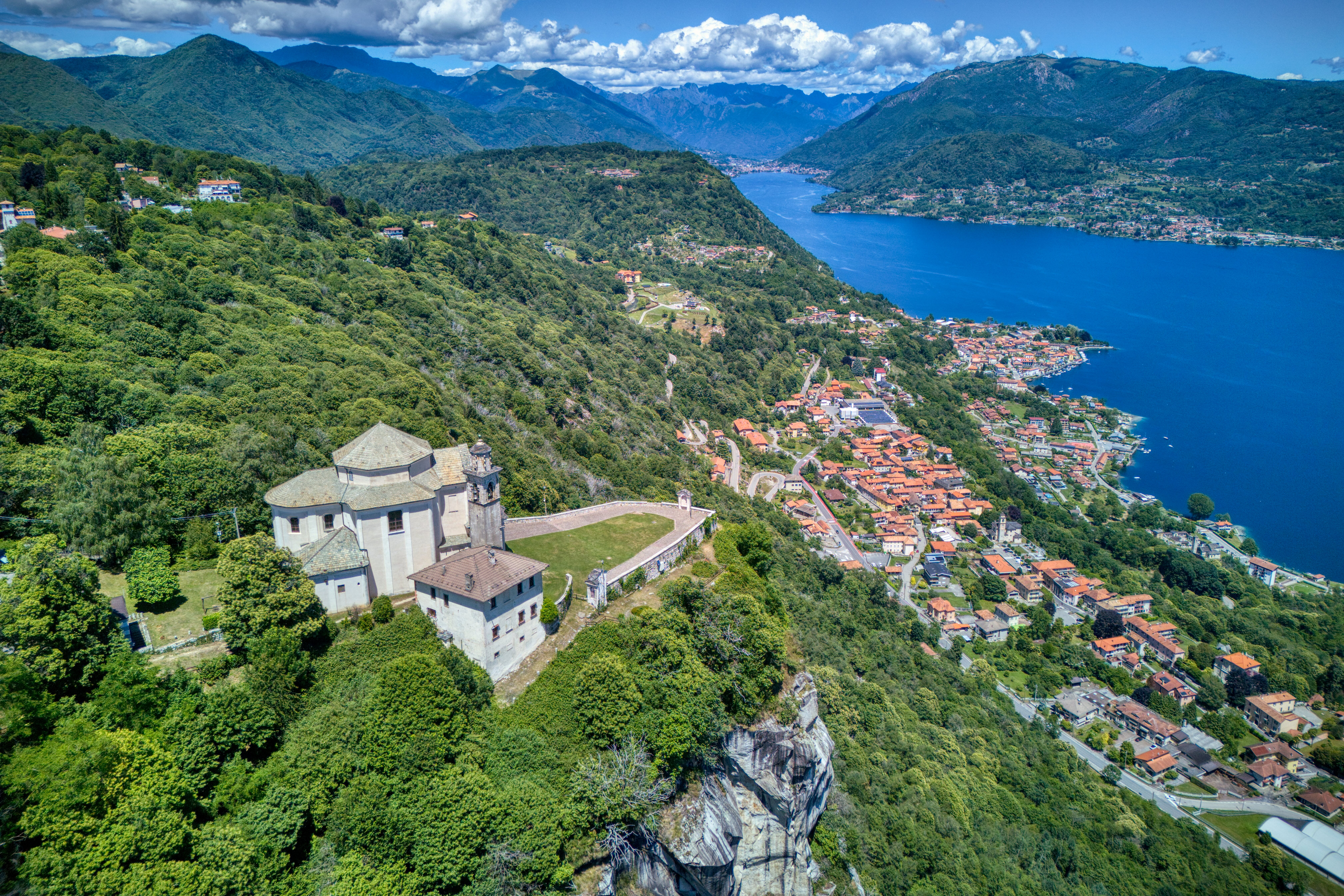
Sanctuary of Madonna del Sasso

The Madonna del Sasso sanctuary is on a spur over the Lake Orta at 638 m height, in the Madonna del Sasso municipality. From the square in front of the church, called "the Cusio's balcony", there is a great view on the lake, the Mottarone, the Alps and the Novara area.

The sanctuary is constituted by the church, the bell tower, and the parish house.

== History ==
For centuries the white granite strata on which the church is built has been used as ashlar. Originally there was a chapel here devoted to Our Lady of Sorrows, dating back to the 16th century. In the square women used to bleach the home-made canvas.

Thanks to the many graces occurred, it was decided to build a church as a substitute for the small chapel. In the church was preserved the statue of Our Lady of the Rosary, which was believed miraculous.

The present complex was promoted by the local Pietro Paolo Minola, who received a grace and decided in 1706 to finance the construction of a new sanctuary. The works began in 1725, thanks to the contribution of the inhabitants. In 1748 the church was complete, while the bell tower and the parish house were finished in 1760. The sanctuary was consecrated in 1771 by the bishop of Novara.

The church has a Greek cross design in a Baroque style with two lateral altars; the architecture and the frescos were made by Lorenzo Peracino. The altarpiece, coming from the old sanctuary, is a panel painting by Fermo Stella and represents the Pietà.

In 1998 the complex has been entirely restored.

== Gallery ==
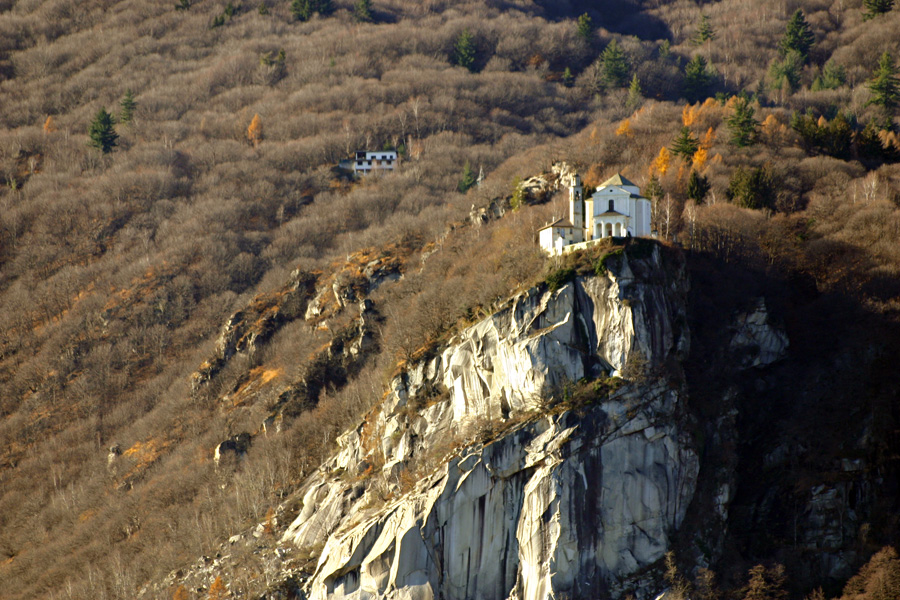
The sanctuary seen from Orta San Giulio

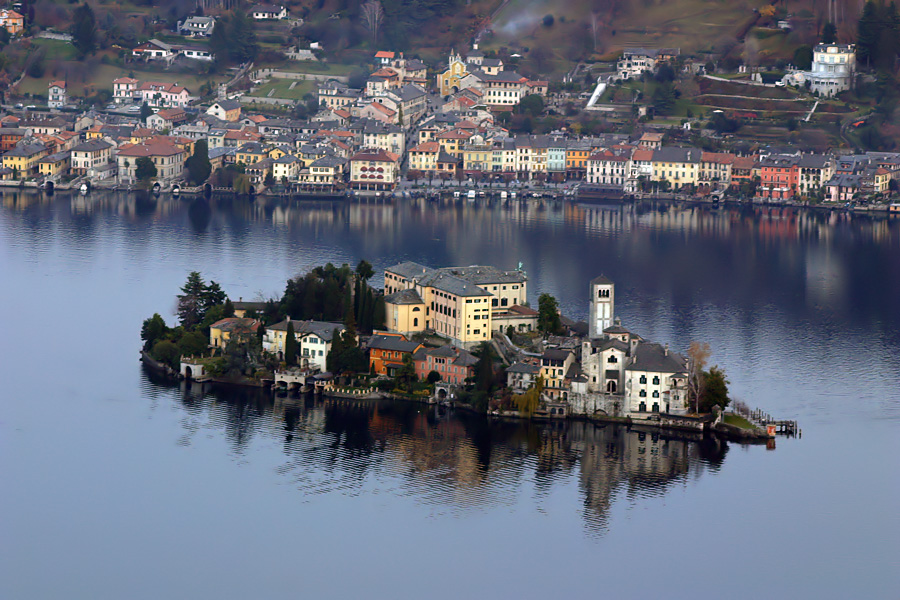
Orta San Giulio seen from the sanctuary

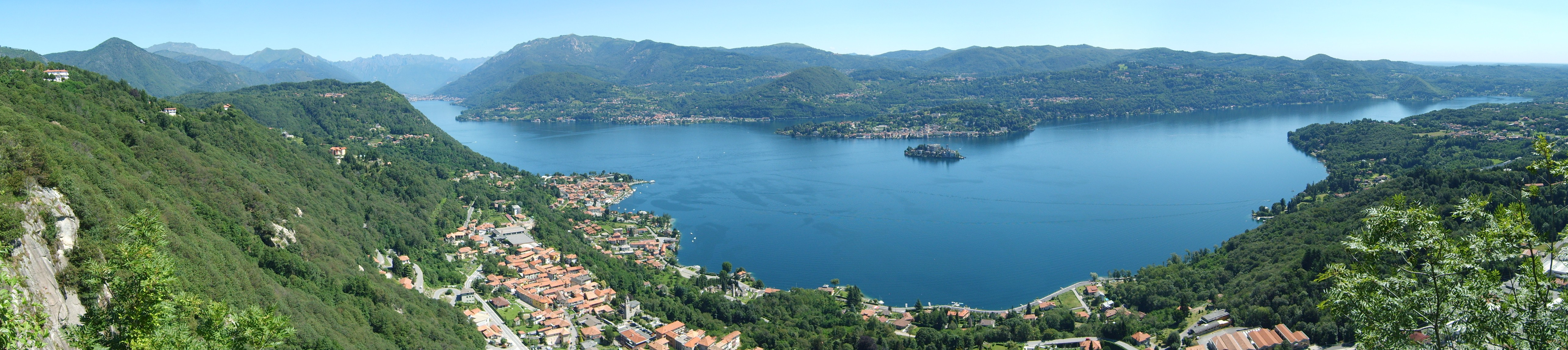
The sanctuary seen from Madonna del Sasso

== See also ==
- CoEur - In the heart of European paths
- Path of Saint Charles

== Bibliography ==
- Madonna del Sasso municipality
- The sanctuary
- Short news
