= World Rowing =

International rowing governing body

- Sport: Rowing
- Category: Sports federation
- Jurisdiction: Worldwide
- Membership: 158 (December 2025)
- Abbreviation: WR, FISA
- Founded: 25 June 1892; 134 years ago in Turin, Italy
- Headquarters: Lausanne, Switzerland
- President: Jean-Christophe Rolland
- Vice president: Tricia Smith

Official website
- worldrowing.com

World Rowing, also known as the World Rowing Federation (officially FISA; French: Fédération internationale des sociétés d'aviron (Note: According to the organization's bylaws, the name remains Fédération internationale des sociétés d'aviron, but "World Rowing is the designation used operationally by FISA")), is the international governing body for rowing. Its current president is Jean-Christophe Rolland who succeeded Denis Oswald at a ceremony held in Lucerne in July 2014.

The World Rowing Cup, World Rowing Championships, and other such competitions are overseen by this organization.

== History ==
=== General ===
It was founded by rowing representatives from France, Switzerland, Belgium, Adriatica, and Italy on 25 June 1892 in Turin in response to the growing popularity of the sport of rowing, and the consequent need for uniformity of regulations over such matters as race lengths, boat composition, and weight classes. Also, at the time, betting on rowing was very popular, and the rowers or coaches were themselves often taking bets. Amateur status, while widespread in England and elsewhere, was unknown in the sport in many nations, a state of affairs which could lead to corruption such as thrown races.

The first regatta organised by the newly formed FISA was the European Rowing Championships and was held in 1893 in Orta, Italy. It only had 10 entries in 3 events and no professional participants. By 1925, the 27th European Championships, held in Prague, included 24 entries in 10 different events.

FISA established its headquarters in Lausanne, Switzerland in 1922.

FISA was the first international sports federation to join the Olympic movement. It has been on the Olympic program since the 1896 Summer Olympics in Athens. (The rowing events at the 1896 games were cancelled because of high winds). Each country that participates in rowing has a federation or governing body which belongs to the World Rowing Congress. These federations (of which there are currently 157) have overall control of what World Rowing does.

FISA decided in 1955 that only a united German team could compete at international rowing championships; this first applied to European Championships and later, from the inaugural in 1962 onwards, to World Championships. This required that East and West Germany held selection trials, with the winning country for each boat class choosing the rowers who would compete at the championships. Over the years, the relationship between the two German countries deteriorated, and East Germany made seven application to FISA congresses to be recognised as a separate and independent country. On the seventh occasion, there was insufficient time to discuss the issue at the congress held in Duisburg just prior to the men's competition of the 1965 European Rowing Championships. FISA president Thomas Keller stated that an extraordinary congress were to be held in November in Vienna that would discuss the issue, and that he personally saw no problem with solving the problems. In October 1965, the International Olympic Committee decided that East Germany was to have its own team at future Olympic Games. At the FISA congress in November 1965, the East German application found forty-six votes of support, four abstentions (from Germany and Austria), and no votes of disapproval. At the same congress, Keller's proposal to not play national anthems or raise flags during medal ceremonies was also approved. These changes first applied at the European Championships (for women) in August 1966 and then the World Championships (for men) two weeks later in September.

In response to the 2022 Russian invasion of Ukraine, World Rowing banned athletes and officials from Russia and Belarus from international competitions. A year later, it started a working group tasked with reinstating Russian and Belarusian athletes.

=== Presidents ===
FISA is led by a president. The following list gives presidents since 1924:

- 1924–1926 Eugène Baud, Switzerland
- 1926–1949 Rico Fioroni, Switzerland
- 1949–1958 Gaston Mullegg, Switzerland
- 1958–1989 Thomas Keller, Switzerland
- 1989–2014 Denis Oswald, Switzerland
- 2014–present Jean-Christophe Rolland, France

== Membership ==
At the 2022 Ordinary Congress, World Rowing admitted its 157th member (158 in December of 2025).

== Continental rowing confederations ==
Five continents:

- Pan American Rowing Confederation (COPARE) – 1995
- European Rowing Board (ERB) – TBD
- African Rowing Federation (FASA) – 1992
- Asian Rowing Federation (ARF) – TBD
- Oceania Rowing Confederation (ORCON) – 2010

== Grouping of member federations ==
Five member groupings:

- Arab Rowing Federation (FAA) – 1990 (Recognized: 2020)
- Balkan Rowing Association (BRA) – 1973 (Recognized: 2020)
- Commonwealth Rowing Association (CRA) – TBD (Recognized: 2019)
- South American Rowing Confederation (CSAR) – TBD (Recognized: 2017)
- Coupe de la Jeunesse (CDLJ) – TBD (Recognized: 2017)

== Events ==
World Rowing organises a large number of international rowing events throughout the year.

=== Women ===
Women competed in rowing events since 1950. With rowing officials from around the world coming to the regatta, the International Rowing Federation (FISA) held an ordinary congress on 30 August 1950 in Milan during the 1950 European Rowing Championships. It was at that congress that it was decided that women's rowing would be trialed. The first test event over the shorter agreed 1,000 m distance was run at the 1951 European Rowing Championships in Mâcon a day prior to the men's competition starting. The 1954 European Rowing Championships were rowing championships held on the Bosbaan regatta course in the Dutch city of Amsterdam. This edition is particularly notable for the fact that it was the first time that women were allowed to compete as part of the championships, after three years of trial regattas for them. Women from 13 countries were represented with 34 boats, and they competed in five boat classes (W1x, W2x, W4x+, W4+, W8+) from 20 to 22 August.

=== Olympics ===
World Rowing has been sponsoring the program for rowing events at the Olympic games since the initial Olympic games in 1896 in Athens. It is also responsible for running the qualification program to select the participants for the games.

=== Paralympics ===
World Rowing has been sponsoring the program for rowing events at the Paralympic games since the 2008 Paralympic Games in Beijing. It is also responsible for running the qualification program to select the participants for the games.

=== World Rowing Cup ===
Started in 1997, the World Cup comprises three regattas held in late Spring and early Summer.

=== World Rowing Championships ===
A week-long regatta held every year. During Olympic years, only non-Olympic boat classes race.

=== World Rowing Under 19 Championships ===
Running since 1967, the World Rowing Junior Championships is for those who are under 18 by the end of the current calendar year. During Olympic years it is held at the same time as the World Rowing Championships. Since 2021, the name 'Under 19' has been used instead of 'Junior'.

=== World Rowing Under 23 Championships ===
First held in 1976, this regatta is for those too old for the Junior Championships but who do not turn 23 by the end of the current calendar year (previously categorised as Senior B by FISA). The event was originally named the Nations Cup and opposed by FISA. In 2002 the name was changed to the World Rowing U23 Regatta and further changed to World Rowing U23 Championships in 2005.

=== World Rowing Coastal Championships ===
First held in 2006. Races are help over 4 km and 6 km courses in coastal specific boat. Can include beach starts and finishes.

=== World Rowing Beach Sprint Finals ===
First held in 2019 in Shenzhen, China. Races are started on a beach with the athlete running to their boat, before rowing a 250m slalom, then turning 180° at the far end and returning to the beach in a straight line. Upon reaching the beach the athlete leaves the boats and runs and dives to a buzzer on the ground.

Editions:

- 2019 World Rowing Beach Sprint Finals – Shenzhen, China
- 2021 World Rowing Beach Sprint Finals – Oeiras, Portugal
- 2022 World Rowing Beach Sprint Finals – Pembrokeshire, Great Britain
- 2023 World Rowing Beach Sprint Finals – Barletta, Italy
- 2024 World Rowing Beach Sprint Finals – Genoa, Italy

=== World Rowing Indoor Championships ===
World Rowing, in partnership with Concept2, USRowing and the Erg Sprints organising committee of Alexandria, Virginia, United States, announced the first World Rowing Indoor Championships to be staged in Alexandria from 17 to 18 February 2018.

Editions:

- 2018 World Rowing Indoor Championship – Alexandria, Virginia, USA
- 2019 World Rowing Indoor Championship – Long Beach, California, USA
- 2020 World Rowing Indoor Championship – Paris, France
- 2021 World Rowing Virtual Indoor Championship – this event was held virtually
- 2022 World Rowing Virtual Indoor Championship – this event was supposed to take place in Hamburg, Germany, but was made to be completely virtual due to the COVID-19 pandemic
- 2023 World Rowing Indoor Championship – Mississauga, Toronto, Canada
- 2023 World Rowing Indoor Championship – Prague, Czech Republic

=== World Rowing Masters Regatta ===
Held since 1973, this event is for rowers 27 years of age or over. Men and women compete in age categories ranging from "A" (27 to 35) to "K" (85 and older). The largest annual international regatta, in 2013 it attracted approximately 3500 competitors who competed in 440 races over four days. There are also events for mixed crews – where half the crew is men and half women (excluding cox).

Recent editions:

- 2019 World Rowing Masters Regatta – Lake Valence, Hungary.
- 2020 World Rowing Masters Regatta – Due to the COVID-19 pandemic, the 2020 regatta was a virtual competition on indoor rowers.
- 2021 World Rowing Masters Regatta – Linz-Ottensheim, Austria
- 2022 World Rowing Masters Regatta – Libourne, France
- 2023 World Rowing Masters Regatta – Pretoria, South Africa
- 2024 World Rowing Masters Regatta – Brandenburg, Germany
- 2025 World Rowing Masters Regatta – Banyoles, Spain

=== World Rowing Sprints ===
A new idea introduced in 2002 as an attempt to bring rowing to the centre of cities. The first (and only) event took place on the Serpentine Lake in Hyde Park, London and was sponsored by Mercedes-Benz. Crews from Great Britain, United States, Germany, and the Netherlands took part in the 500 m race. Famous rowing champions raced, including Matthew Pinsent, James Cracknell, and Marcel Hacker.

Each team was made up of 13 rowers (5 women, 7 men, and a cox). Events were held in Women's Single Sculls, Men's Single Sculls, Women's Double Sculls, Men's Pairs, Women's Pairs and Men's Fours. These crews then combined to form Mixed Quad Sculls and Eights.

Great Britain were the eventual winners and crowned the Mercedes-Benz Sprints Champions.

== See also ==
- Thomas Keller Medal – awarded annually by World Rowing to a rower(s) with an outstanding international career
