= Sacro Monte di Orta =

Coordinates: 45°47′52″N 8°24′40″E

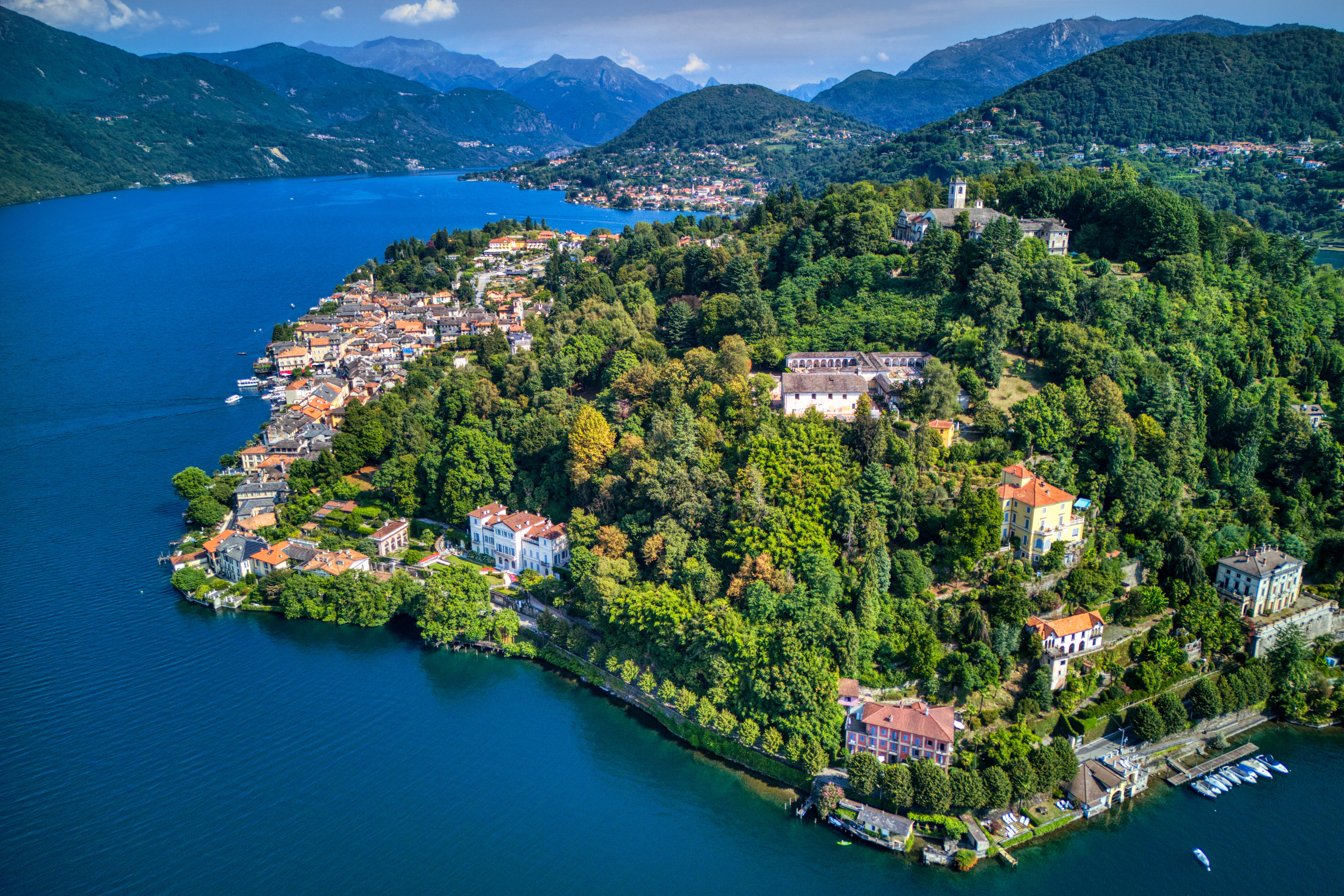
The Sacro Monte di Orta on the summit of San Nicolao hill, on the eastern shore of Lake Orta

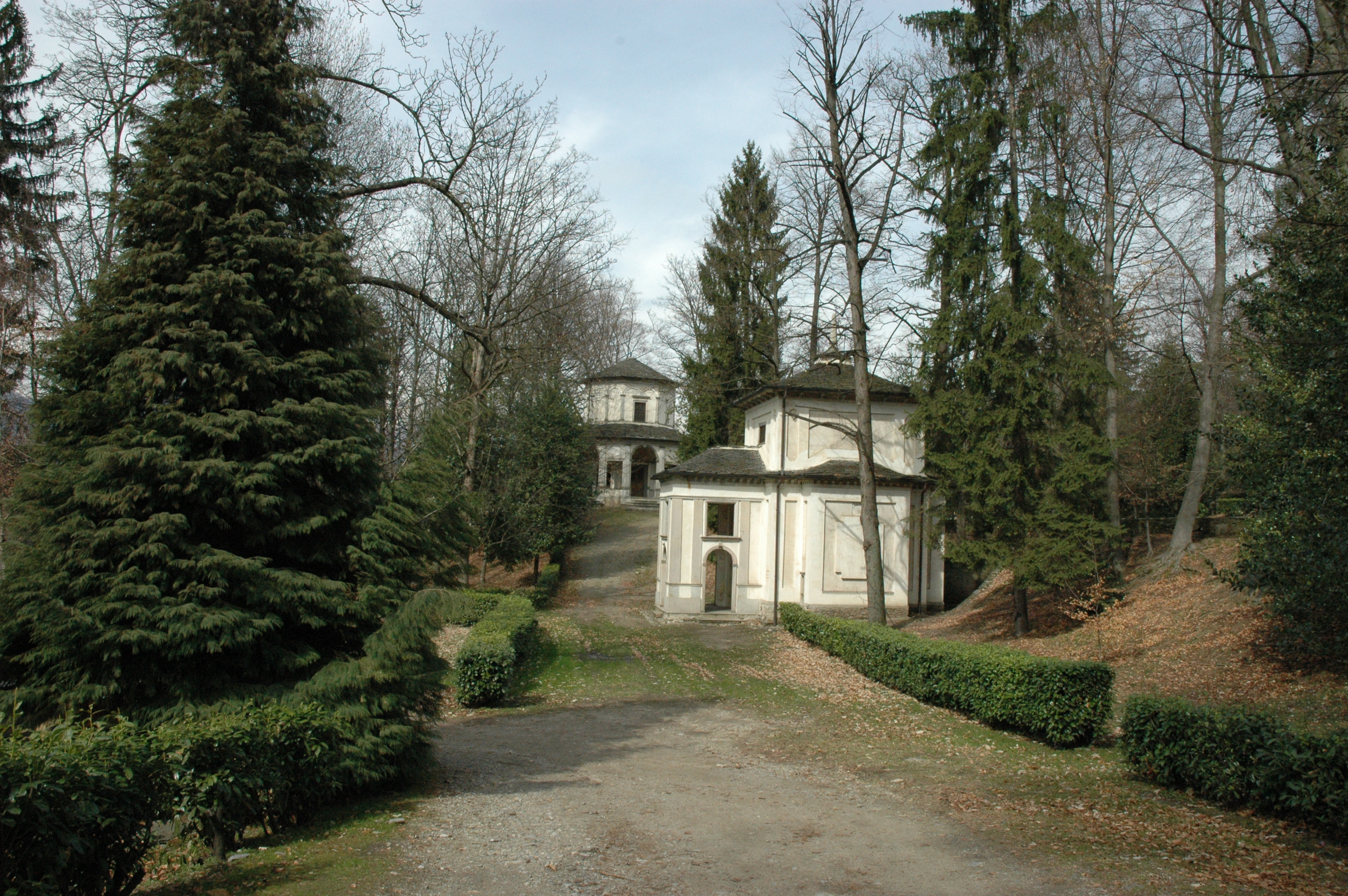
View of the chapels and the park

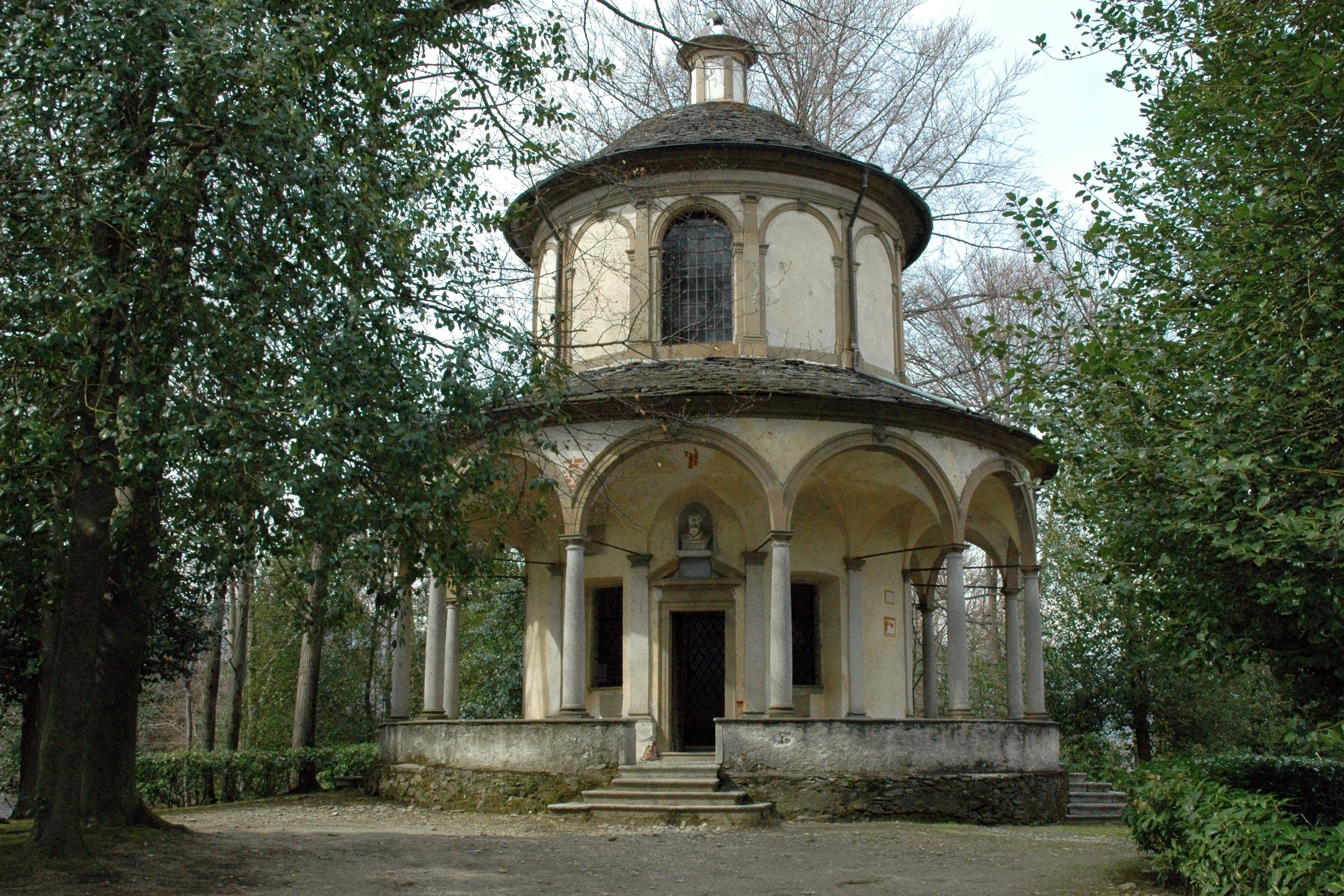
View of the Chapel 15, housing the St. Francis Receiving the Stigmata

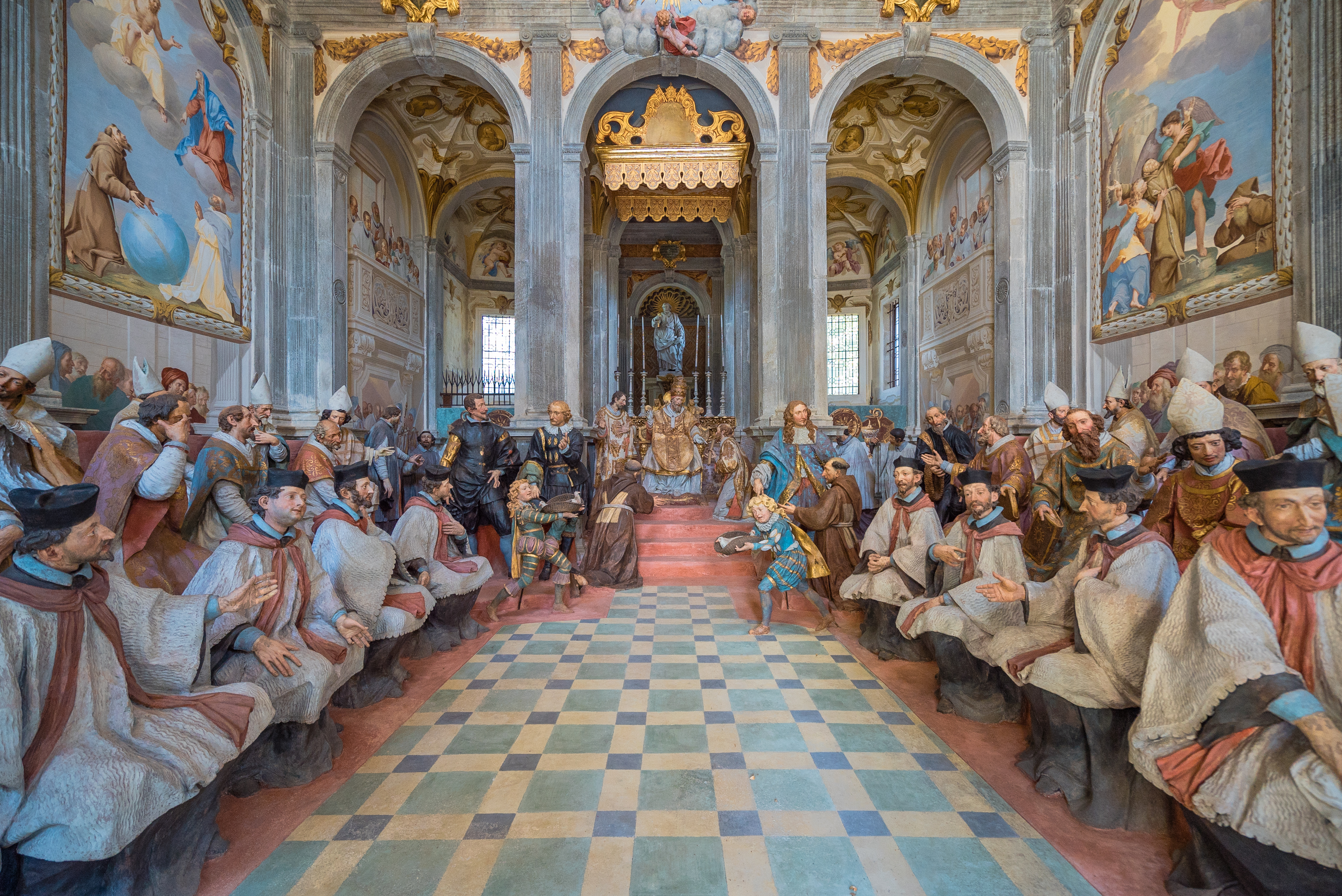
Cappella XX Orta San Giulio

The Sacro Monte di Orta (literally: "Sacred Mountain of Orta") is a Roman Catholic devotional complex in the comune of Orta San Giulio (Piedmont, northern Italy) on the summit of a hill known as San Nicolao, on the eastern shore of Lake Orta. It is one of the Sacri Monti of Piedmont and Lombardy, included in UNESCO World Heritage list.

It is a stop-over on the CoEur devotional path.

Many of the artworks are of a high quality, some of the most highly thought of painters and sculptors of the period having been commissioned to produce them. The vegetation of the Sacred Mountain runs down to the shores of Lake Orta and was designed in line with ornamental criteria to match the architecture.

== History ==
Construction of the complex, dedicated to St. Francis of Assisi, began in 1583. The project by the Capuchin friar Cleto da Castelletto Ticino involved 36 chapels, of which only 20 were built. Until 1630 they were mostly in the Mannerist style, but from the mid-17th century, Baroque and other influences predominated. Construction ended in 1788.
