= Arola =

- Comune
- Comune di Arola
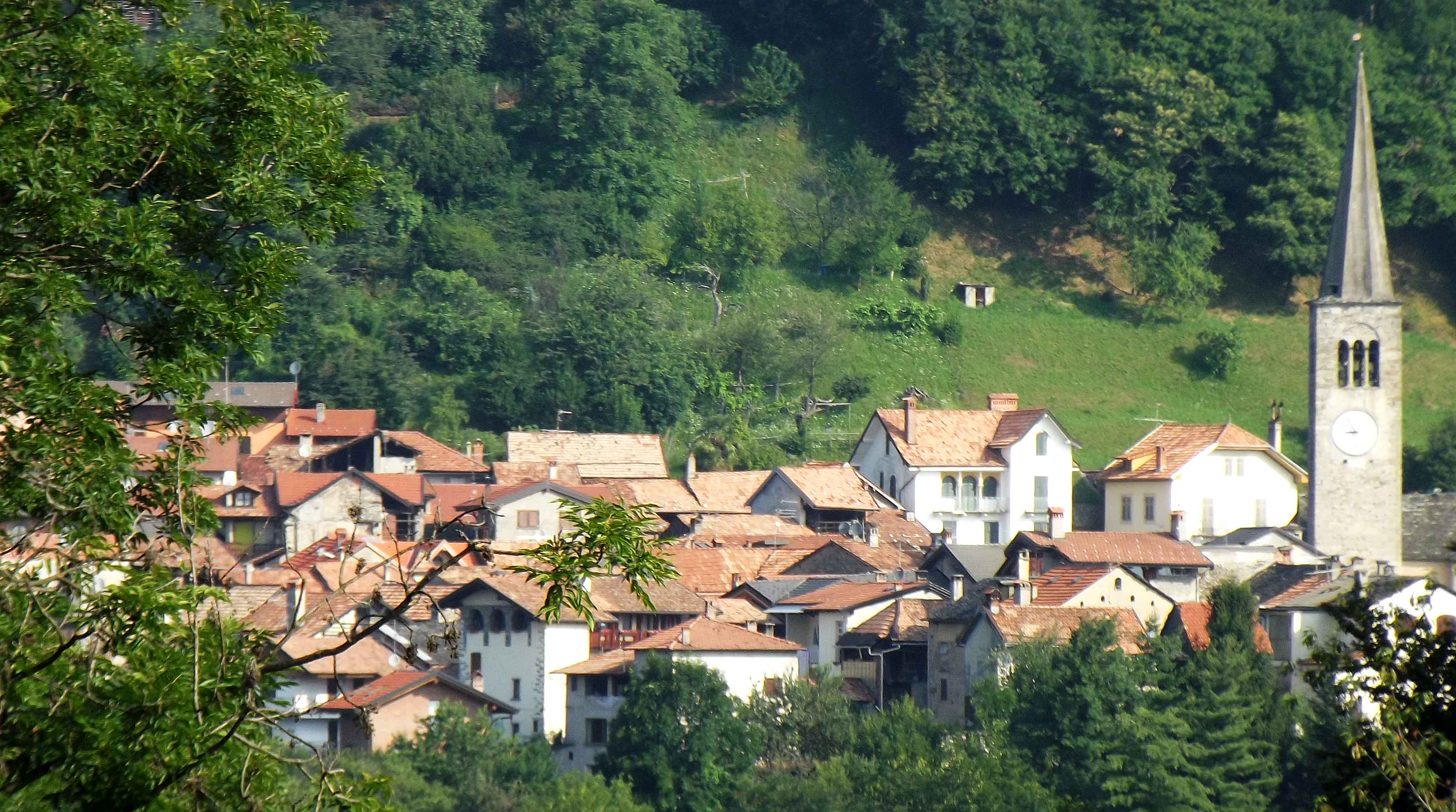
- Panorama from Artò

- Location of Arola in Italy Arola (Piedmont)
- Coordinates: 45°48′N 8°21′E
- Country: Italy
- Region: Piedmont
- Province: Province of Verbano-Cusio-Ossola (VB)
- Frazioni: Pianezza

Area
  - Total: 6.5 km^{2} (2.5 sq mi)
- Elevation: 615 m (2,018 ft)

Population (Dec. 2004)
  - Total: 284
  - Density: 44/km^{2} (110/sq mi)
- Demonym: Arolesi
- Time zone: UTC+1 (CET)
  - Summer (DST): UTC+2 (CEST)
- Postal code: 28010
- Dialing code: 0323

Arola is a comune (municipality) in the Province of Verbano-Cusio-Ossola in the Italian region Piedmont, located about 100 km (62 mi) northeast of Turin and about 20 km (12 mi) southwest of Verbania. As of 31 December 2004, it had a population of 284 and an area of 6.5 km^{2} (2.5 mi^{2}).

The municipality of Arola contains the frazione (subdivision) Pianezza.

Arola borders the following municipalities: Cesara, Civiasco, Madonna del Sasso.

== Demographic evolution ==
Historical population

Year	Pop.	±%
1861	768	—
1871	780	+1.6%
1881	792	+1.5%
1901	684	−13.6%
1911	570	−16.7%

Year	Pop.	±%
1921	590	+3.5%
1931	503	−14.7%
1936	437	−13.1%
1951	364	−16.7%
1961	384	+5.5%

Year	Pop.	±%
1971	368	−4.2%
1981	323	−12.2%
1991	291	−9.9%
2001	279	−4.1%

Source: Data from ISTAT
