= Civiasco =

- Comune
- Comune di Civiasco
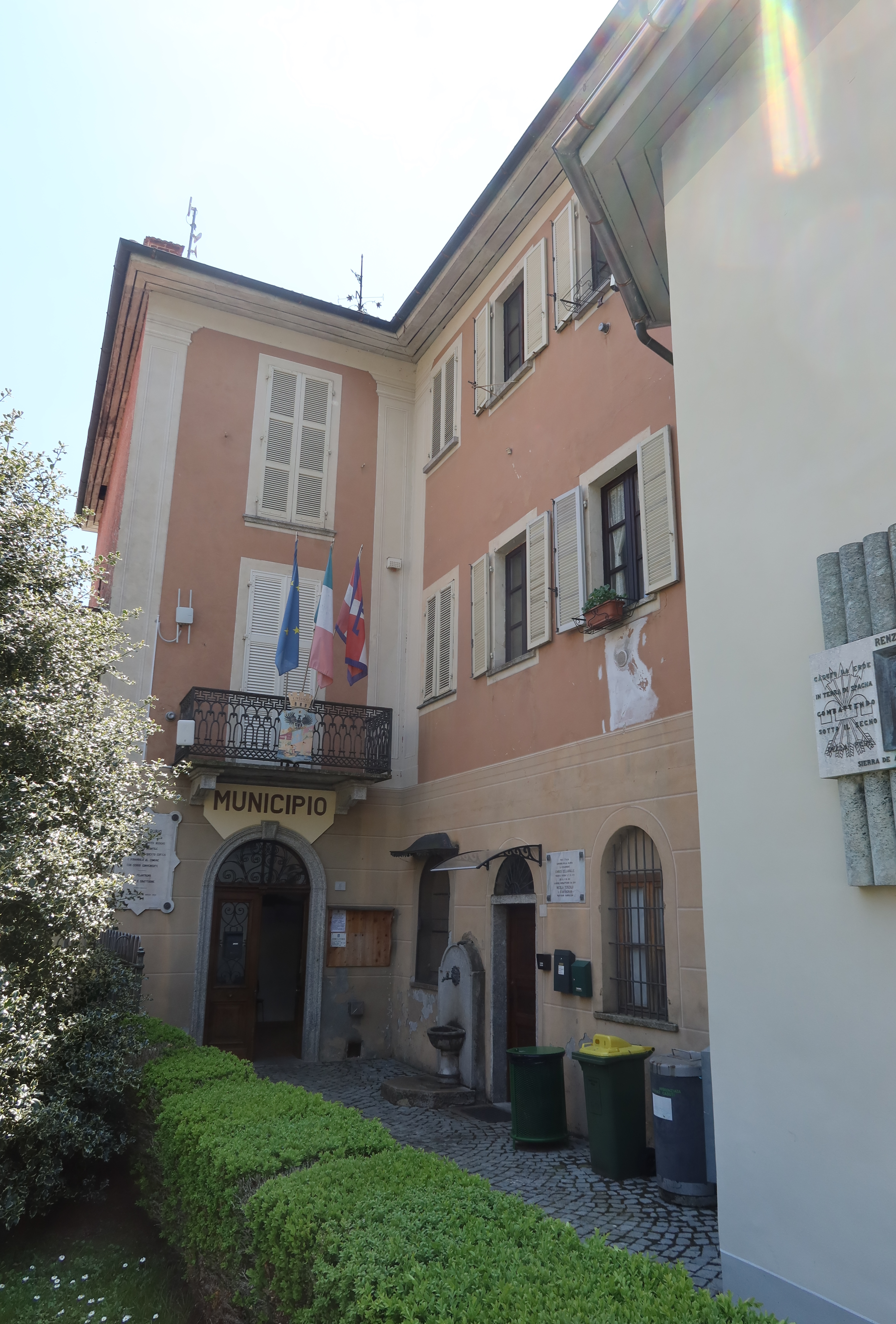
- Town hall

- Location within Italy Location within Piedmont
- Coordinates: 45°48′N 8°18′E
- Country: Italy
- Region: Piedmont
- Province: Vercelli (VC)
- Frazioni: Campolungo

Government
  - Mayor: Davide Calzoni

Area
  - Total: 7.39 km^{2} (2.85 sq mi)

Population (30 June 2017)
  - Total: 250
  - Density: 34/km^{2} (88/sq mi)
- Demonym: Civiascotti
- Time zone: UTC+1 (CET)
  - Summer (DST): UTC+2 (CEST)
- Postal code: 13010
- Dialing code: 0163
- Website: Official website

Civiasco is a comune (municipality) in the Province of Vercelli in the Italian region Piedmont, located about 90 kilometres (56 mi) northeast of Turin and about 50 kilometres (31 mi) north of Vercelli.

Civiasco borders the following municipalities: Arola, Cesara, Madonna del Sasso, and Varallo Sesia.

== People ==
- Emma Morano (b. 1899–2017), supercentenarian and the last ever person from the 1800s
