= Cesara =

- Comune
- Comune di Cesara
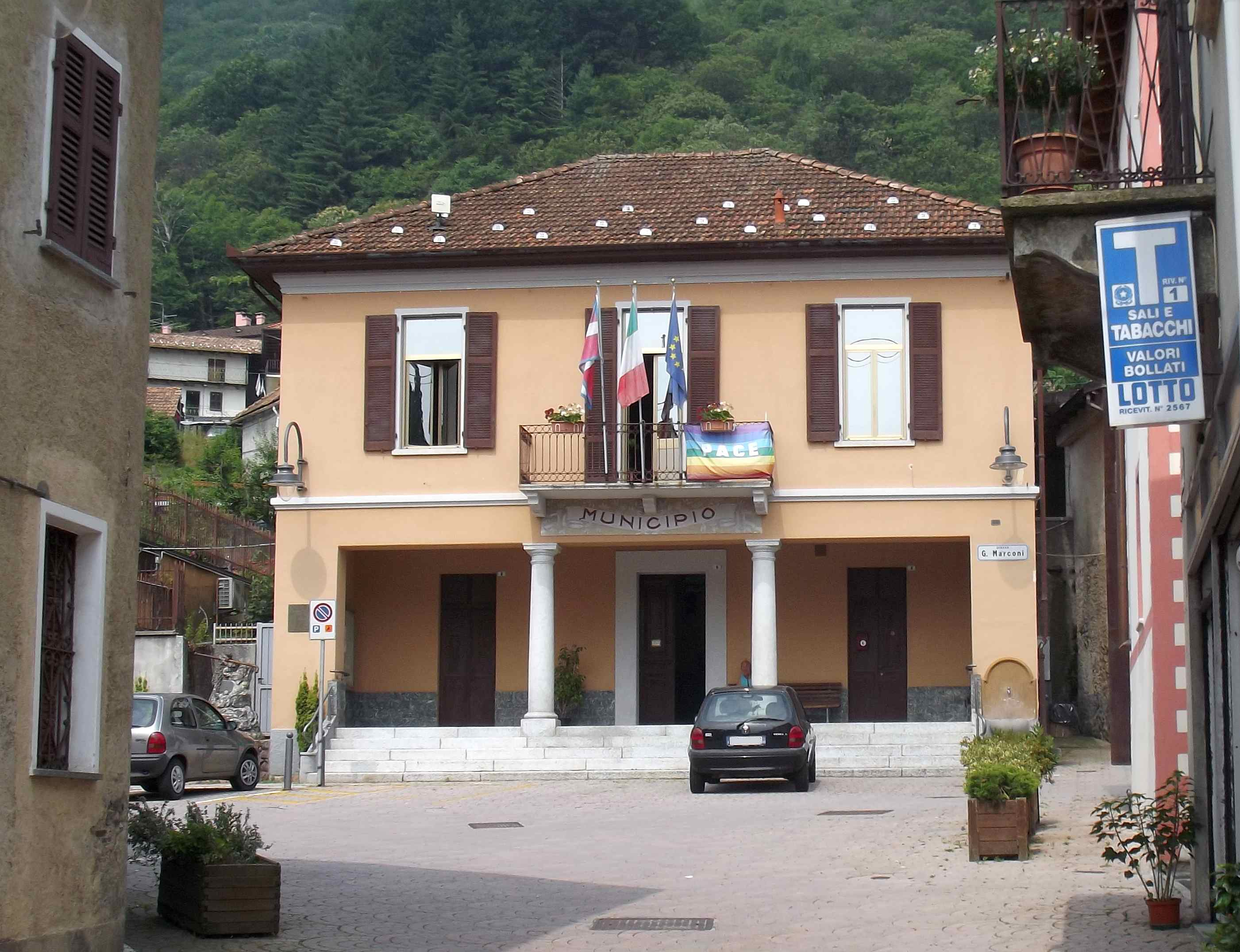

- Location within Italy Location within Piedmont
- Coordinates: 45°50′N 8°22′E
- Country: Italy
- Region: Piedmont
- Province: Province of Verbano-Cusio-Ossola (VB)
- Frazioni: Colma, Grassona, Egro

Area
  - Total: 11.3 km^{2} (4.4 sq mi)
- Elevation: 499 m (1,637 ft)

Population (Dec. 2004)
  - Total: 617
  - Density: 54.6/km^{2} (141/sq mi)
- Demonym: Cesaresi
- Time zone: UTC+1 (CET)
  - Summer (DST): UTC+2 (CEST)
- Postal code: 28010
- Dialing code: 0323

Cesara is a comune (municipality) in the Province of Verbano-Cusio-Ossola in the Italian region Piedmont, located about 100 kilometres (62 mi) northeast of Turin and about 15 kilometres (9 mi) southwest of Verbania. As of 31 December 2004, it had a population of 617 and an area of 11.3 square kilometres (4.4 mi^{2}).

The municipality of Cesara contains the frazioni (subdivisions, mainly villages and hamlets) Colma, Grassona, and Egro.

Cesara borders the following municipalities: Arola, Civiasco, Madonna del Sasso, Nonio, Pella, Varallo Sesia.

== Demographic evolution ==
Historical population

Year	Pop.	±%
1861	945	—
1871	1,034	+9.4%
1881	1,064	+2.9%
1901	903	−15.1%
1911	872	−3.4%

Year	Pop.	±%
1921	856	−1.8%
1931	762	−11.0%
1936	730	−4.2%
1951	704	−3.6%
1961	749	+6.4%

Year	Pop.	±%
1971	788	+5.2%
1981	684	−13.2%
1991	579	−15.4%
2001	606	+4.7%

Source: Data from ISTAT
