= Guglielmo Tagliacarne =

Tagliacarne Guglielmo (31 May 1893 in Orta San Giulio, Novara, Italy – 10 April 1979 in Rome, Italy) was an Italian statistician

== Biography ==
Guglielmo Tagliacarne was born in Orta San Giulio, Novara, on May 31, 1893. He studied at the Bocconi University, Milan, obtaining a master's degree in Economics. He carried on his statistical studies analyzing supply chains, buying and consumption behaviors, demographic and occupational trends and the provincial and regional calculation of National Income.

He was awarded an honour for his service during the 1st World War. In 1922, he started his lessons about Statistics and Social Science Methodology at the Human Society School for the application of cooperation, welfare service and social legislation. In October 1925, he introduced a memoir on International Disaster Statistics at the International congress of Statistics in Rome. In the 1930s, he studied Internal Trade for the General Confederation of Trade.

He had to fight again as an Officer during the 2nd World War, and was imprisoned in India by the English. During his captivity he taught Economics and Statistics to fellow prisoners of war. After World War II, he researched the Italian Industry situation for the Ministry of Reconstruction. In the following years (1947/1968) he became Secretary-general for the Chamber of Commerce in Milan. In the meantime, he was in charge of the newly constituted (1947) Italian Union of Chambers of Commerce, leading the role that he covered for more than 20 years.

He was a Professor of Statistics and Demographics at several Italian universities, including institutions in Milan, Rome, Pavia, Macerata, and Pisa, as well as at international universities in Caracas and Lima. He died in Rome on April 10, 1979. Seven years after his death, the eponymous Guglielmo Tagliacarne Institute was established as a foundation dedicated to the research and training of Economic culture, taking inspiration from his works.

== Research interests ==
Market Research. Provincial and regional calculation of National Income. Consumer and Supply Chain interaction. Commercial Dealers behaviour. Demographic and Occupational trend.

== Education ==
Master's degree in Economic Sciences obtained in 1920 at Bocconi University in Milan.

== Academic positions ==
University Professor of Statistics and Demographics.

== Honours, awards ==
In 1986 a foundation of research and training of the Italian Union of Chambers of Commerce was entitled “Guglielmo Tagliacarne Institute”.

== Known for ==
Founder of the Italian Association for Market Studies (AISM) and of the School of Economic Development, now Master Tagliacarne of Economic Development. Welfare and Economic-Productive Activity Indicators regarding territorial specificity.

== Students ==
Luigi Pieraccioni, one of his students and co-founder of Tagliacarne Institute, developed his researches gaining a deep understanding from data analysis.

== Publications ==
- Scritti di economia e statistica, 1938, Stab. tipografico de “La Gazzetta dello sport”, Milano, XVII, a cura dei funzionari e impiegati dell‟Unione fascista dei commercianti della provincia di Milano;
- Demografia dell'India: Studio di Demografia di Comparata, 1949, Studi Monografie della Società taliana di Demografia e Statistica, N. 1, Roma;
- Tecnica e pratica delle ricerche di mercato, 1951, Giuffrè Editore, Milano, 4 ed. (1964);
- Variazioni territoriali dello stato economico tra il 1938 e il 1952 in Italia e in altri Paesi, 1954, Studi e Monografie della Società Italiana di Economia Demografia e Statistica, N. 7;
- Lo studio delle aree di mercato in Italia, 1957, Giuffrè Editore, Milano;
- Barometro economico, 1963–1966, in Rassegna economica, Napoli, Banco di Naloli;
- 260 aree economiche in Italia. Contributo alla programmazione, 1966, Giuffrè Editore, Milano;
- Direzione dei Periodici: Sintesi economica (dal 1948) e Studi di mercato (dal 1955).

== Link ==
http://www.tagliacarne.it/ https://sites.google.com/site/dizionariosis/poster-statistici/tagliacarne-gugliemo
