= Eugène Baud =

Swiss rower and rowing official

Personal information
- Born: 1866
- Died: 1926 (aged 59–60)

Sport
- Sport: Rowing
- Club: Lausanne RC
Medal record
Men's rowing
Representing Switzerland
European Rowing Championships
| Gold medal – first place | 1893 Lake Orta | Coxed four |

Eugène Baud (1866–1926) was a Swiss rower and rowing official. He was the first permanent president of the Fédération Internationale des Sociétés d'Aviron (FISA), the International Rowing Federation. He started for Lausanne RC and was later its president.
