= Artò =

- Frazione
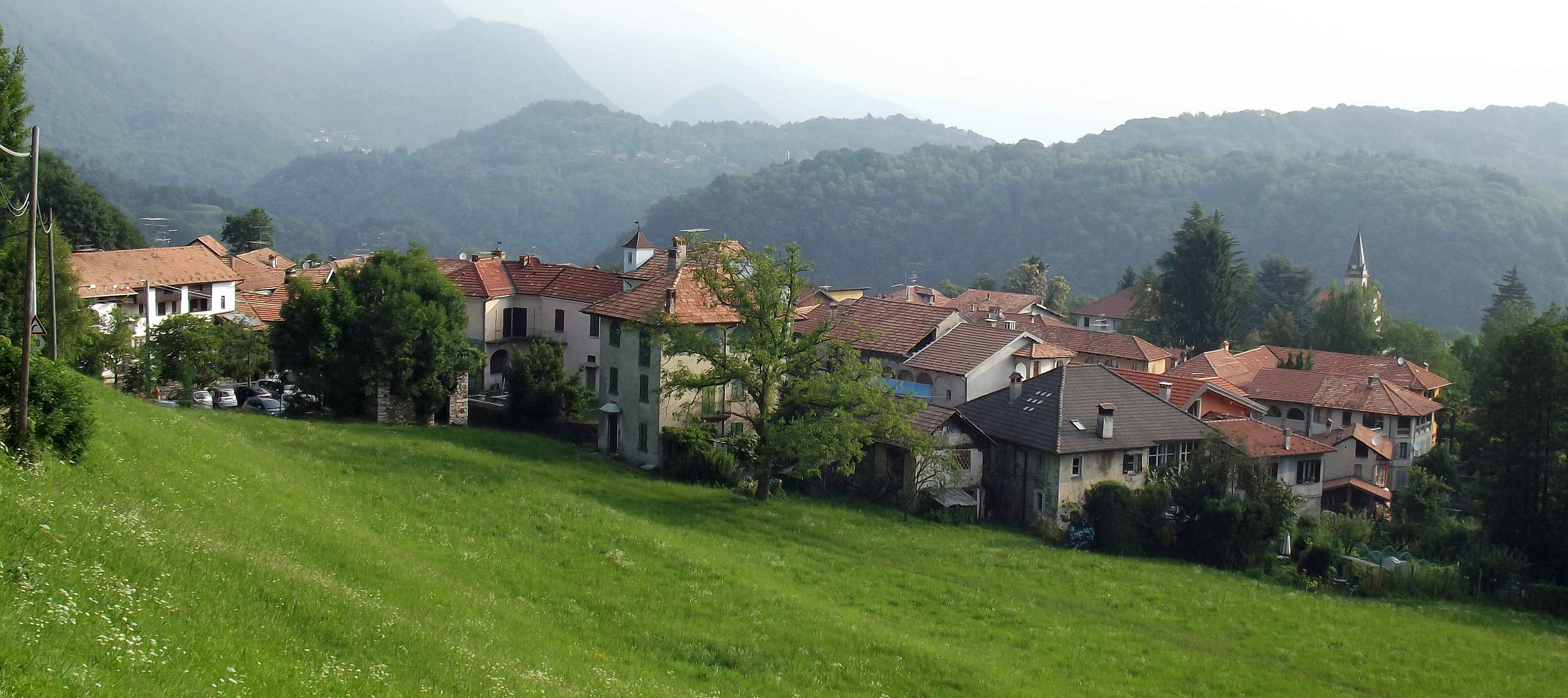
- Panoramic view

- Location of Artò in Italy
- Coordinates: 45°48′06″N 8°21′55″E
- Country: Italy
- Region: Piedmont
- Province: Verbano-Cusio-Ossola (VB)
- Comune: Madonna del Sasso
- Elevation: 607 m (1,991 ft)
- Time zone: UTC+1 (CET)
  - Summer (DST): UTC+2 (CEST)
- Postal code: 28010
- Dialing code: (+39) 0322

Artò is a frazione (and parish) of the municipality of Madonna del Sasso, in Piedmont, northern Italy.

== Overview ==
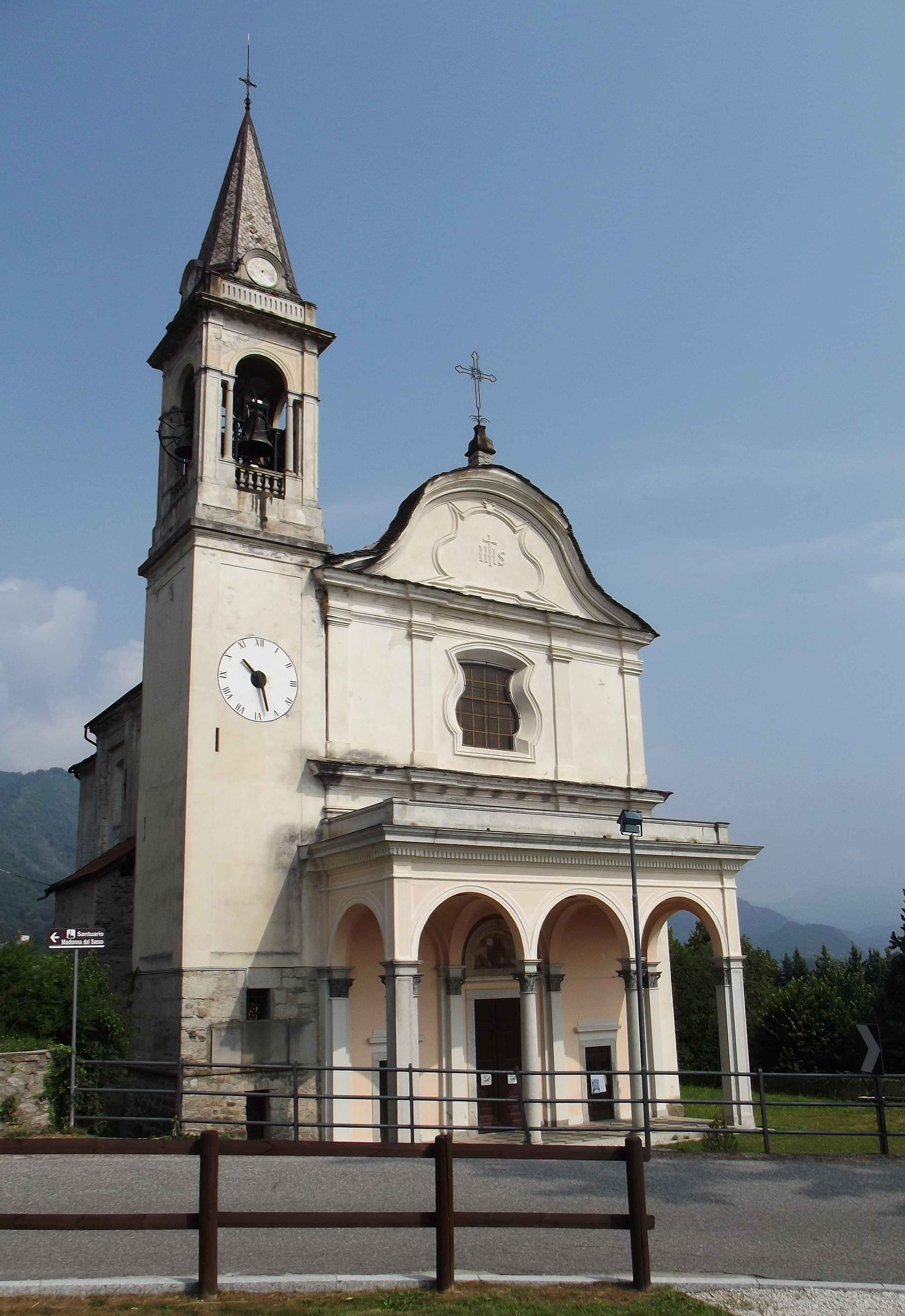
Parish church of San Bernardino

It is a village located some km west from the Lake Orta.

== History ==
Since 1928 Artò was a separate comune (municipality).
