= Pella, Piedmont =

Pella
- Comune
- Comune di Pella
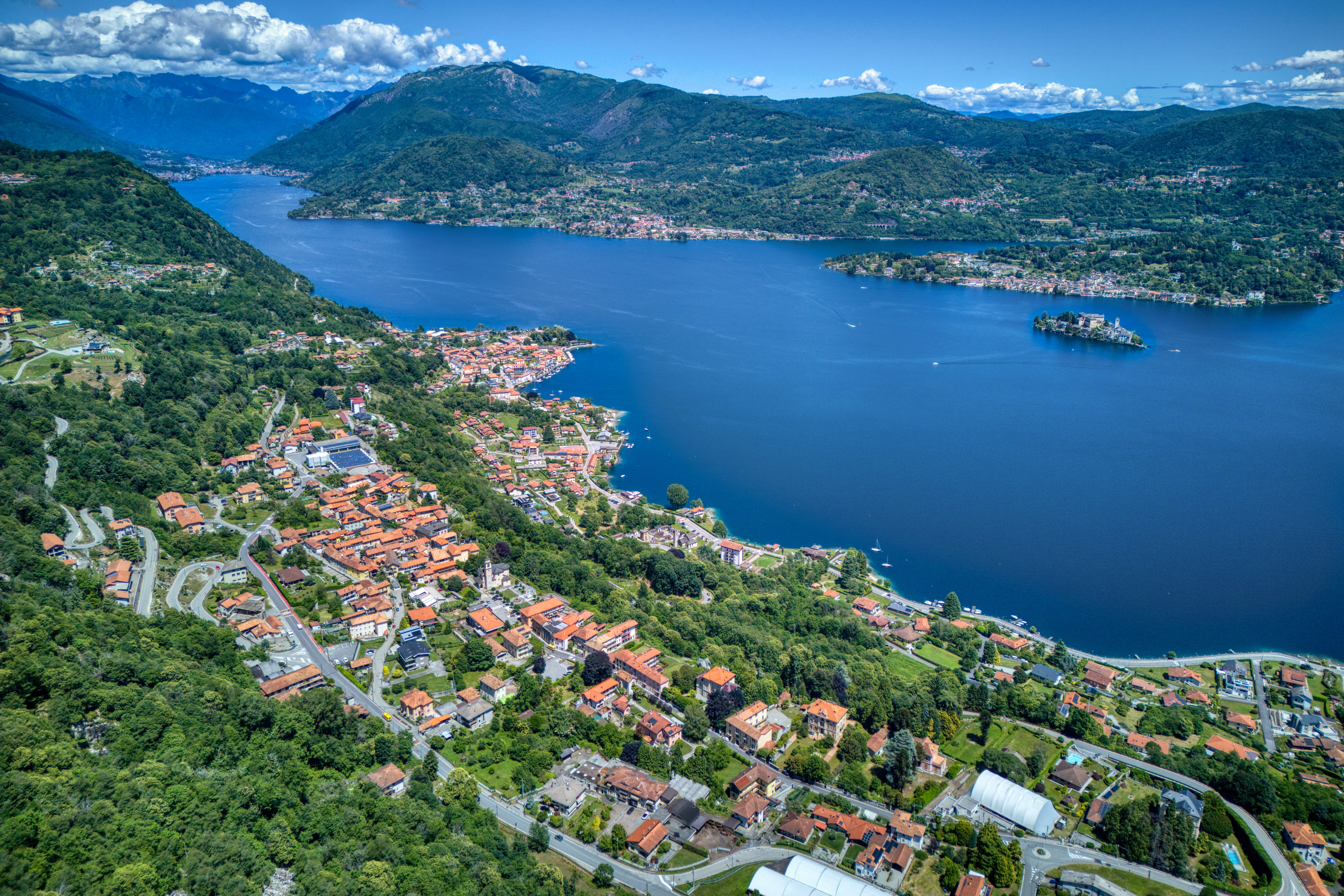
- Pella along Lake Orta

- Coat of arms

- Location within Italy Location within Piedmont
- Coordinates: 45°48′N 8°23′E
- Country: Italy
- Region: Piedmont
- Province: Novara (NO)
- Frazioni: Alzo, Monte S.Giulio, Ronco, Ventraggia

Government
  - Mayor: Nello Francesco Ferlaino

Area
  - Total: 8.1 km^{2} (3.1 sq mi)

Population (Dec. 2004)
  - Total: 1,159
  - Density: 140/km^{2} (370/sq mi)
- Time zone: UTC+1 (CET)
  - Summer (DST): UTC+2 (CEST)
- Postal code: 28010
- Dialing code: 0322
- Website: Official website

Pella is a comune (municipality) in the Province of Novara in the Italian region Piedmont, located about 100 km (62 mi) northeast of Turin and about 45 km (28 mi) northwest of Novara on the Lake Orta. It borders the municipalities of Cesara, Madonna del Sasso, Nonio, Orta San Giulio, Pettenasco, and San Maurizio d'Opaglio.
