= 1893 European Rowing Championships =

- Venue: Lake Orta
- Location: Italy
- Dates: 10–11 September 1893

The 1893 European Rowing Championships were the inaugural European Rowing Championships held on Lake Orta in Italy on 10 and 11 September. The competition was for men only, and the regatta had three boat classes (M1x, M4+, M8+).

== Medal summary ==
Event	Gold		Silver		Bronze	
Event	Country & rowers	Time	Country & rowers	Time	Country & rowers	Time
M1x	Belgium; Edouard Lescrauwaet		Italy; Vittorio Leone		France; E. Lepron	
M4+	Switzerland; Ben Longchamp; Alfred Baud; Georges Vuillet; Eugène Baud; Henri Sauer (cox)		Italy; Giulio Rebuschini; Giacomo Leva; Felice Terruzzi; Angelo Brambillasca; L. Bassano (cox)		Belgium; Auguste Lescrauwaet; Edouard Lescrauwaet; Charles Lescrauwaet; Adrien de Giey	
M8+	France; Laurent^{1} Filiolau^{1} Gaston Clipet^{2} Auguste Trarieux^{2} J. Delpierre^{2} Ch. Gadebled^{2} P. Panchaud^{1} Pétrus Gatier^{1} François Lebrault^{1} (cox)		Italy; Luigi Rossi; Giuseppe Gribaudi; Augusto Lange; Pietro Lange; Antonio Pagliani; Ferruccio Somaglia; Ercole Aimone; Attilio Chiantore		Belgium; Louis Choisy; Paul de Gottal; Octave Schepens; Léonce Roels; Raymond Roels; Isidore Devriendt; Achille Ardenois; Victor De Bisschop; Jules Wilbo (cox)	

The French eight was made up from members of two clubs:
1) Union Nautique de Lyon
2) Émulation Nautique de Boulogne
