= Madonna del Sasso, Piedmont =

Madonna del Sasso
- Comune
- Comune di Madonna del Sasso
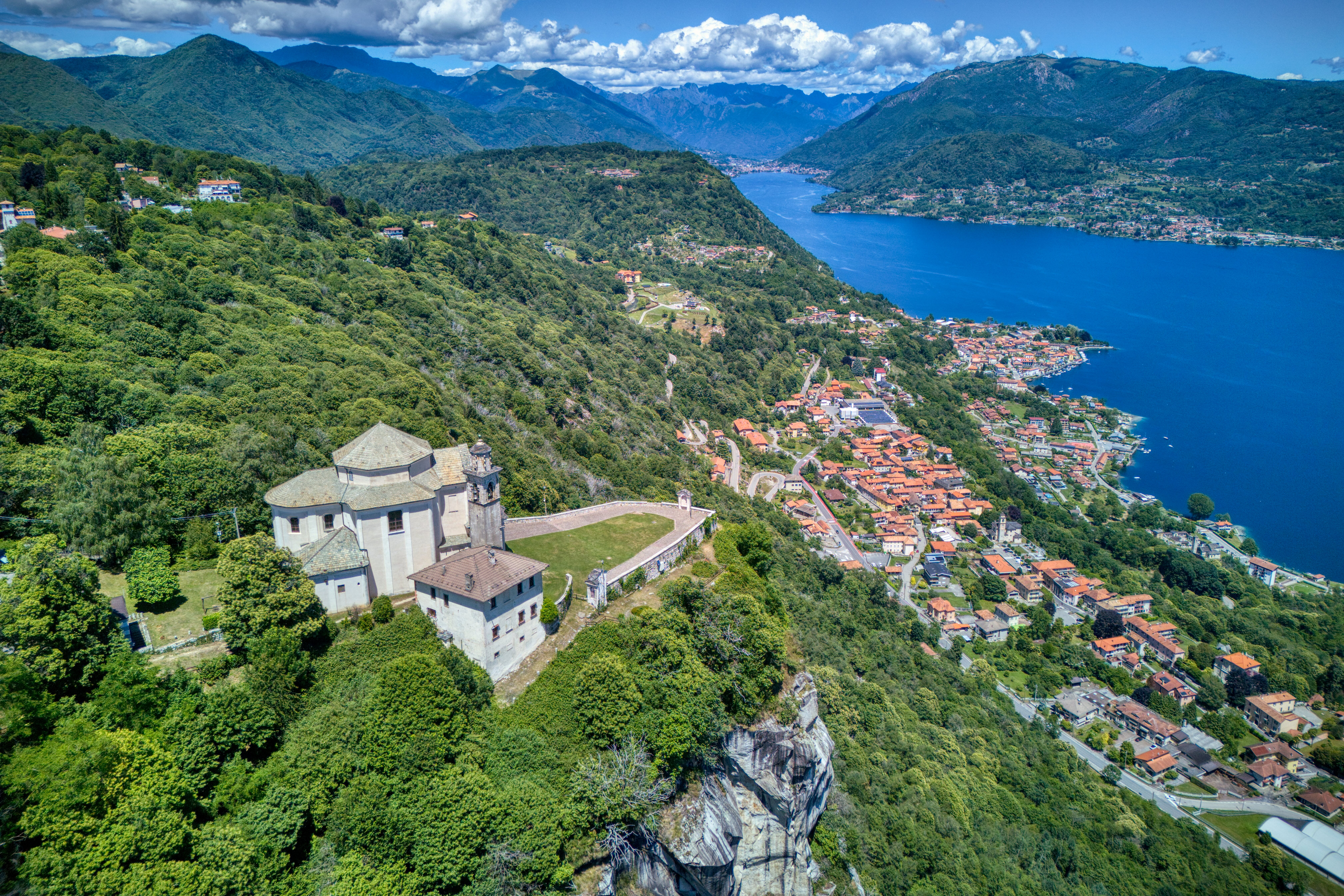
- Sanctuary of Madonna del Sasso.

- Coat of arms

- Location within Italy Location within Piedmont
- Coordinates: 45°48′N 8°22′E
- Country: Italy
- Region: Piedmont
- Province: Verbano-Cusio-Ossola (VB)
- Frazioni: Artò, Boleto (municipal seat), Centonara, Piana dei Monti

Government
  - Mayor: Ezio Barbetta

Area
  - Total: 15.41 km^{2} (5.95 sq mi)
- Elevation: 696 m (2,283 ft)

Population (31 December 2010)
  - Total: 399
  - Density: 25.9/km^{2} (67.1/sq mi)
- Demonym: Varies according to the frazione
- Time zone: UTC+1 (CET)
  - Summer (DST): UTC+2 (CEST)
- Postal code: 28010
- Dialing code: 0322
- Patron saint: Varies according to the frazione
- Saint day: Varies according to the frazione

Madonna del Sasso is a comune (municipality) in the Province of Verbano-Cusio-Ossola in the Italian region of Piedmont, located about 100 kilometres (62 mi) northeast of Turin and about 20 kilometres (12 mi) southwest of Verbania, just to the west of Lake Orta. The municipal seat is in the frazione of Boleto.

It borders the following municipalities: Arola, Cellio con Breia, Cesara, Civiasco, Pella, Pogno, San Maurizio d'Opaglio, Valduggia, Varallo Sesia.
