= San Maurizio d'Opaglio =

- Comune
- Comune di San Maurizio d'Opaglio
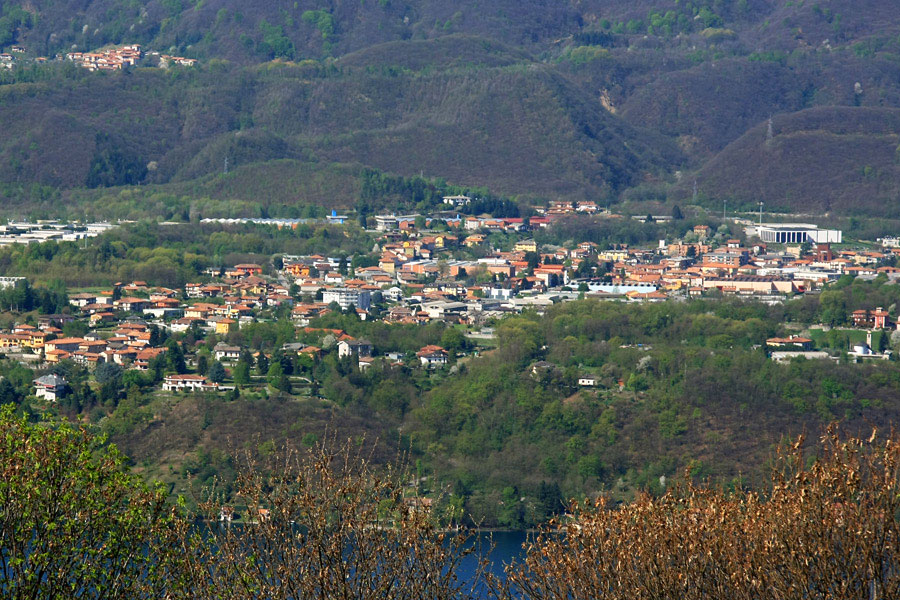
- View of San Maurizio d'Opaglio

- Location within Italy Location within Piedmont
- Coordinates: 45°46′N 8°23′E
- Country: Italy
- Region: Piedmont
- Province: Novara (NO)
- Frazioni: Sazza, Pascolo, Lagna, Alpiolo, Opagliolo, Bacchiore, Briallo, Pianelli, Vacchetta, Raveglia, Niverate

Government
  - Mayor: Diego Bertona

Area
  - Total: 8.51 km^{2} (3.29 sq mi)
- Elevation: 373 m (1,224 ft)

Population (Dec. 2004)
  - Total: 3,064
  - Density: 360/km^{2} (933/sq mi)
- Demonym: Sammauriziesi
- Time zone: UTC+1 (CET)
  - Summer (DST): UTC+2 (CEST)
- Postal code: 28017
- Dialing code: 0322
- Website: Official website

San Maurizio d'Opaglio is a comune (municipality) in the Province of Novara in the Italian region of Piedmont, located about 90 kilometres (56 mi) northeast of Turin and about 40 kilometres (25 mi) northwest of Novara.

San Maurizio d'Opaglio borders the following municipalities: Gozzano, Madonna del Sasso, Orta San Giulio, Pella, and Pogno.
