= Lambert Straatman =

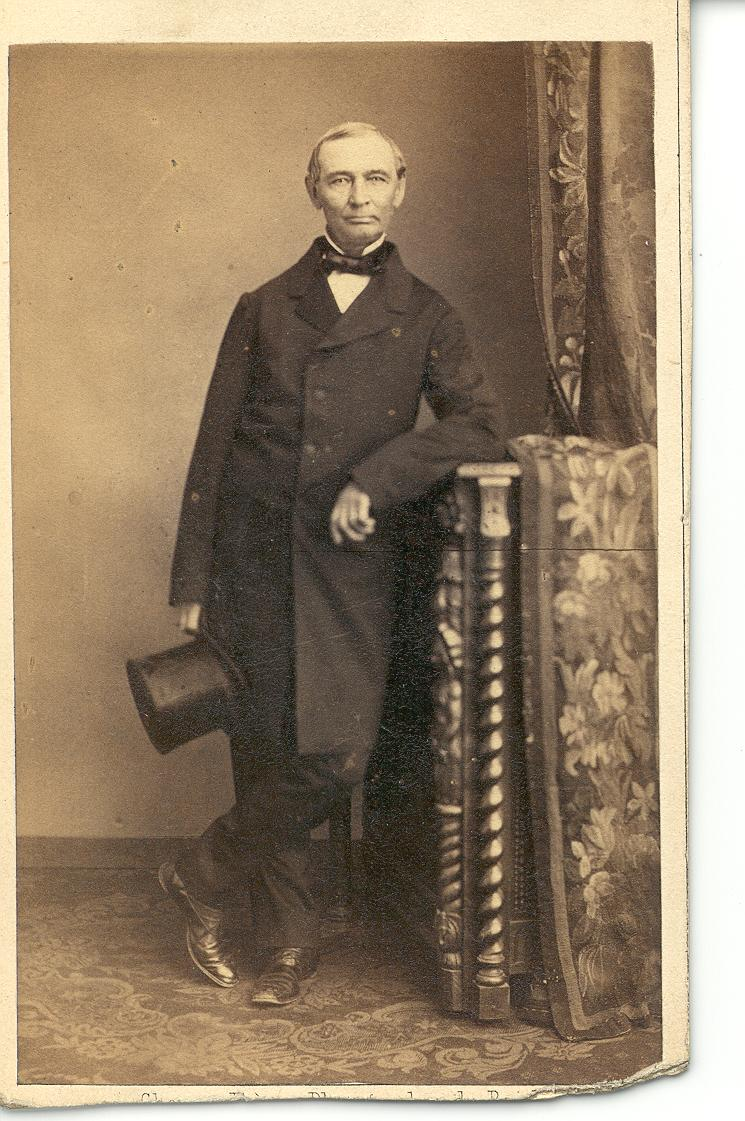
- Born: 14 October 1802; Bergen op Zoom
- Died: 18 April 1888 (aged 85); Ixelles
- Occupation: ship-owner

Lambert Straatman (14 October 1802 – 18 April 1888) was a Belgian ship-owner from Brussels. Born in Bergen op Zoom, he moved to Brussels around 1826 and became a naturalised Belgian citizen in 1841.
