= Nonio =

- Comune
- Comune di Nonio
- Coat of arms

- Location within Italy Location within Piedmont
- Coordinates: 45°50′N 8°22′E
- Country: Italy
- Region: Piedmont
- Province: Province of Verbano-Cusio-Ossola (VB)

Government
  - Mayor: Pierugo Pirall

Area
  - Total: 9.8 km^{2} (3.8 sq mi)
- Elevation: 476 m (1,562 ft)

Population (30 November 2017)
  - Total: 855
  - Density: 87/km^{2} (230/sq mi)
- Demonym: Noniesi
- Time zone: UTC+1 (CET)
  - Summer (DST): UTC+2 (CEST)
- Postal code: 28010
- Dialing code: 0323
- Website: Official website

Nonio is a comune (municipality) in the Province of Verbano-Cusio-Ossola in the Italian region Piedmont, located about 100 kilometres (62 mi) northeast of Turin and about 15 kilometres (9 mi) southwest of Verbania.

Nonio borders the following municipalities: Cesara, Omegna, Pella, Pettenasco, Quarna Sotto, Varallo.
