= Lake Orta =

Lake in Piedmont, Italy

- Cusio
- Lago d'Orta (Italian); Lagh d'Òrta; Cusi (Piedmontese); Lagh d'Òrta; Cusi (Lombard)
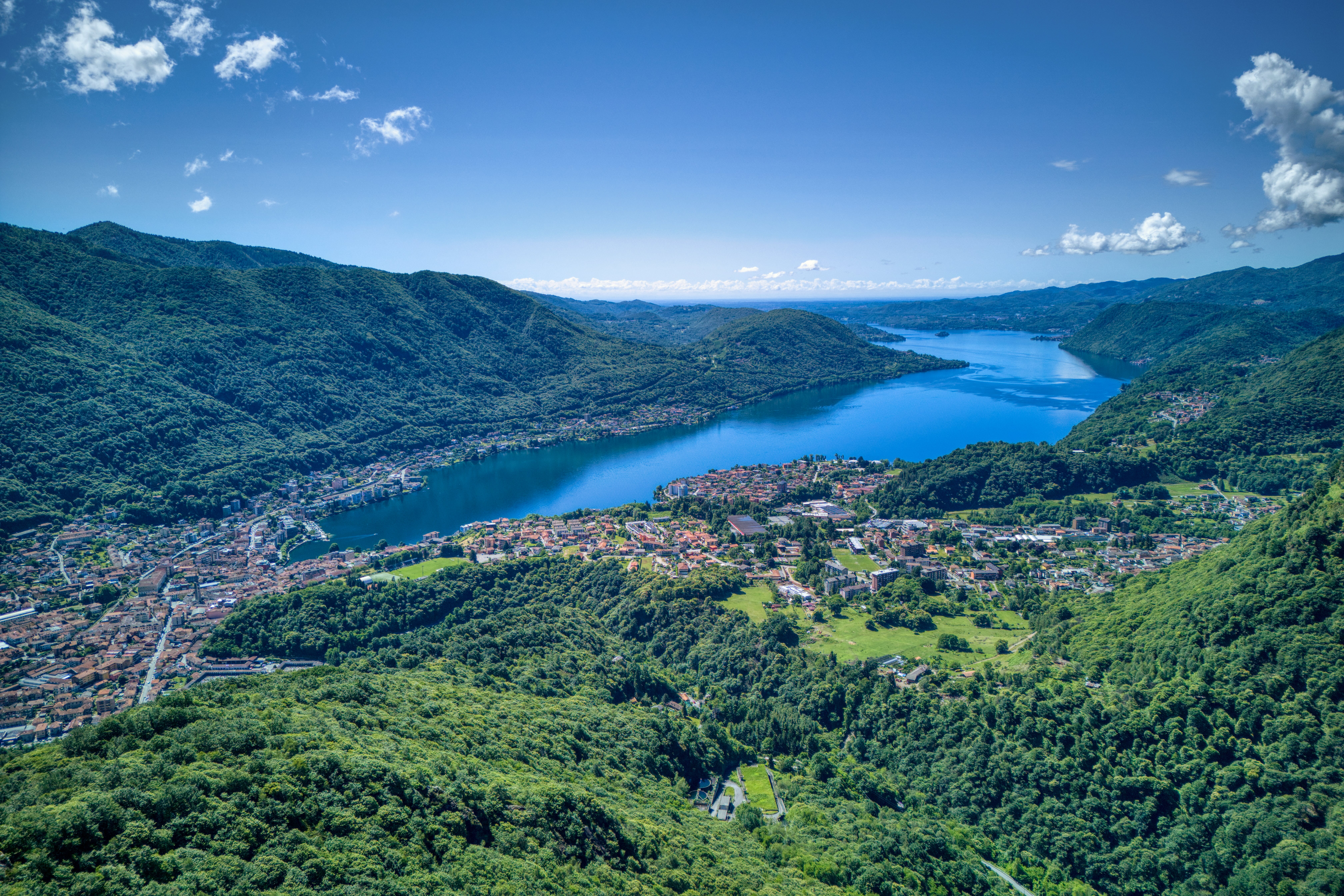

- Location within Piedmont
- Location: Piedmont
- Coordinates: 45°49′02″N 8°24′24″E
- Primary inflows: underground springs, Scarpia, Pellino, Plesna, Qualba, Fiumetta, Pescone
- Primary outflows: Nigoglia
- Catchment area: 116 km^{2} (45 sq mi)
- Basin countries: Italy
- Max. length: 13.4 km (8.3 mi)
- Max. width: 2.5 km (1.6 mi)
- Surface area: 18.2 km^{2} (7.0 sq mi)
- Average depth: 71.6 m (235 ft)
- Max. depth: 143 m (469 ft)
- Water volume: 1.3 km^{3} (1,100,000 acre⋅ft)
- Residence time: 8.9 years
- Surface elevation: 290 m (950 ft)
- Islands: Isola San Giulio
- Settlements: Gozzano, Miasino, Nonio, Omegna, Orta San Giulio, Pella, Pettenasco, San Maurizio d'Opaglio

Lake Orta (Italian: Lago d'Orta; Lombard and Piedmontese: Lagh d'Òrta) or Cusio (Lombard and Piedmontese: Cusi; Latin: Lacus Cusius) is a lake in northern Italy, west of Lake Maggiore.

Until the 16th century, it was called Lago di San Giulio, after Saint Julius of Novara (4th century), the patron saint of the region.

Its southern end is about 35 kilometers (22 miles) by rail to the northwest of Novara (located on the main Turin-Milan line), while its northern end is about 6 kilometers (4 miles) by rail south of the Gravellona-Toce railway station, itself located halfway between Ornavasso and Omegna.

Its scenery is characteristically Italian, while San Giulio island has some picturesque buildings. The island was fortified between the 5th and 6th centuries.

Located around the lake are Orta San Giulio, built on a peninsula projecting from the east shore of the lake, Omegna at its northern extremity, Pettenasco to the east, and Pella to the west.

It is supposed that the lake is the remnant of a much larger sheet of water which carried the waters of the Toce south towards Novara. As the glaciers retreated, the waters flowing from them diminished and were gradually diverted into Lake Maggiore.

The inaugural European Rowing Championships were held on Lake Orta in 1893.

Frequent ferry service connects towns and villages around the lake.

== Gallery ==
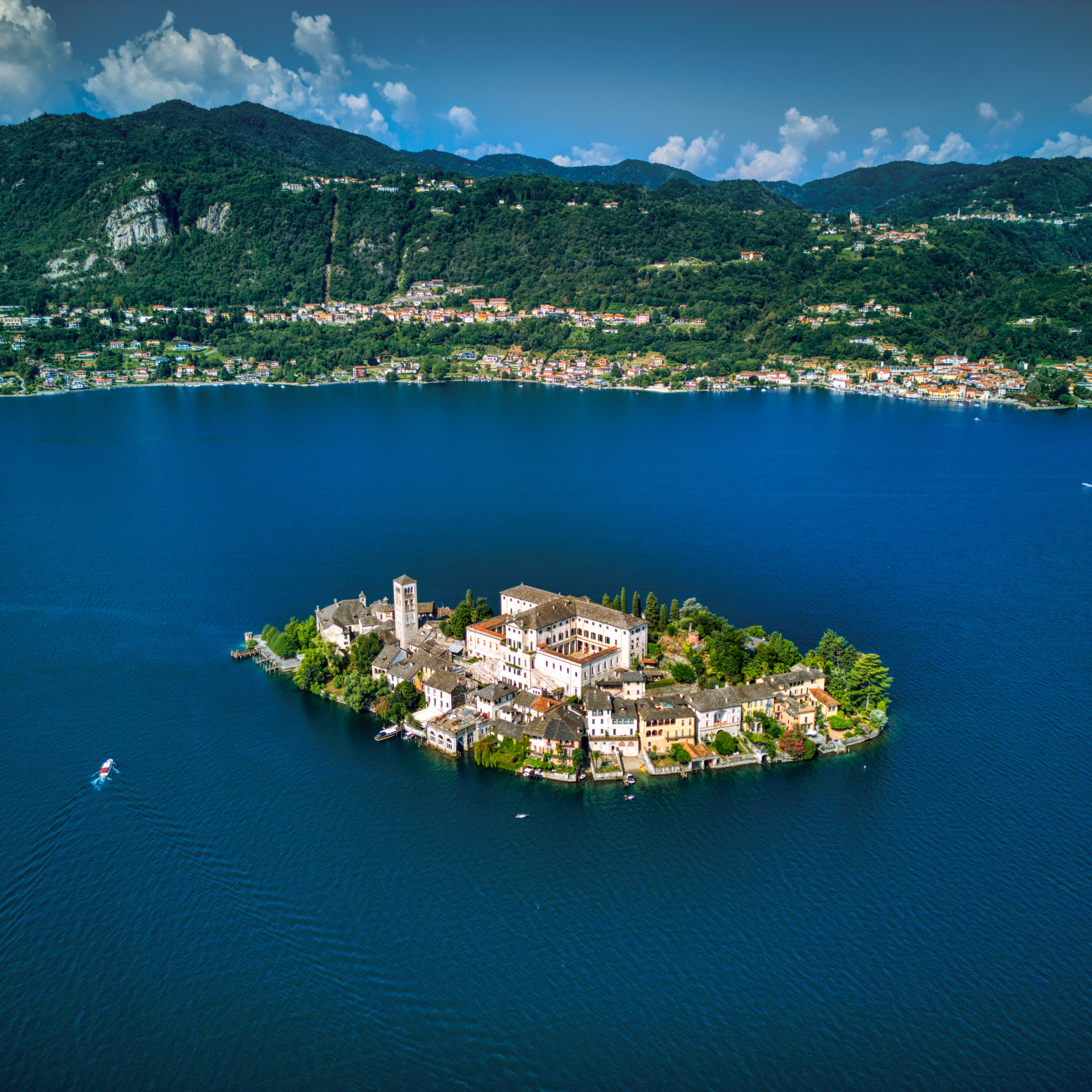
Isola San Giulio

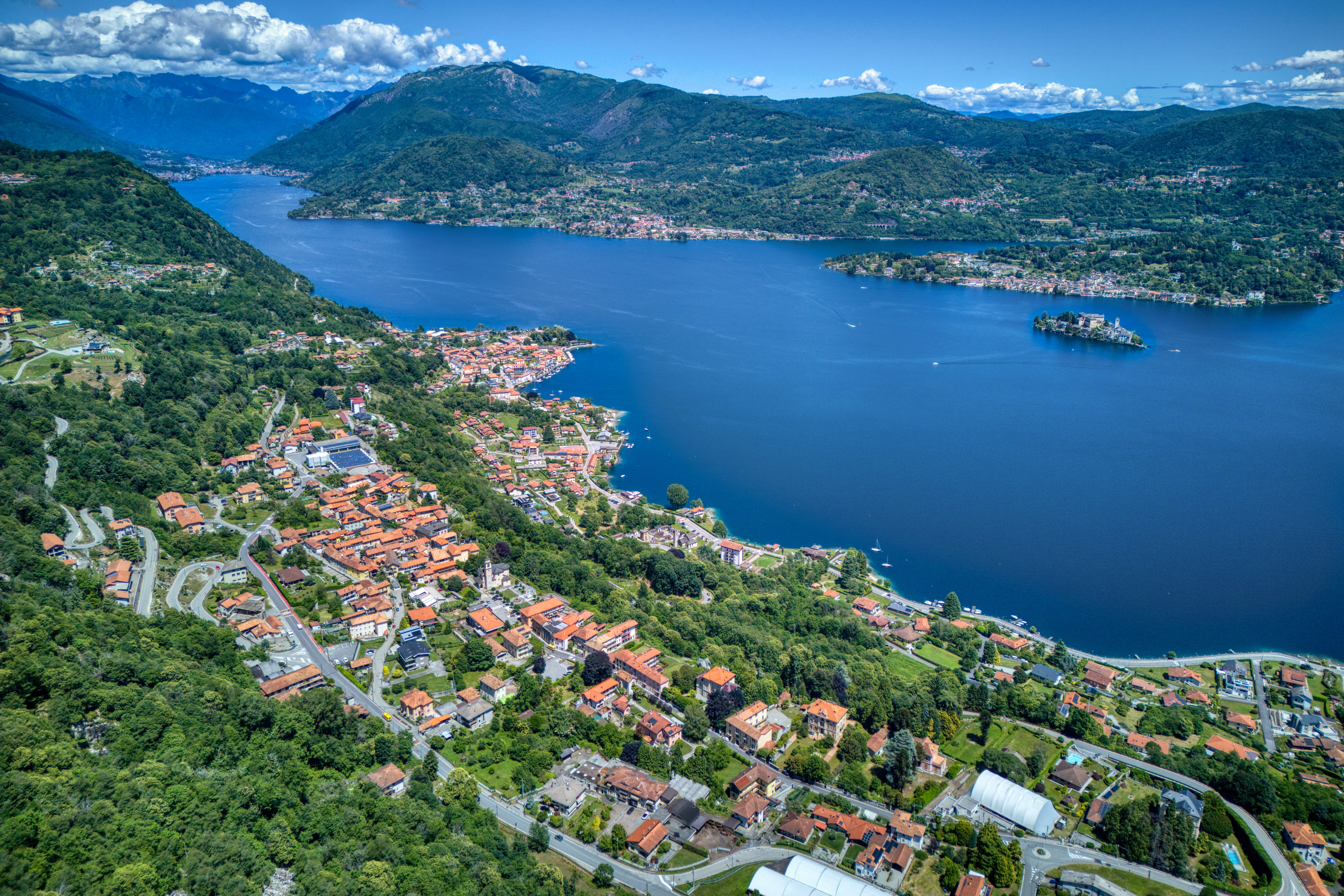
The lake seen from the Sanctuary of Madonna del Sasso

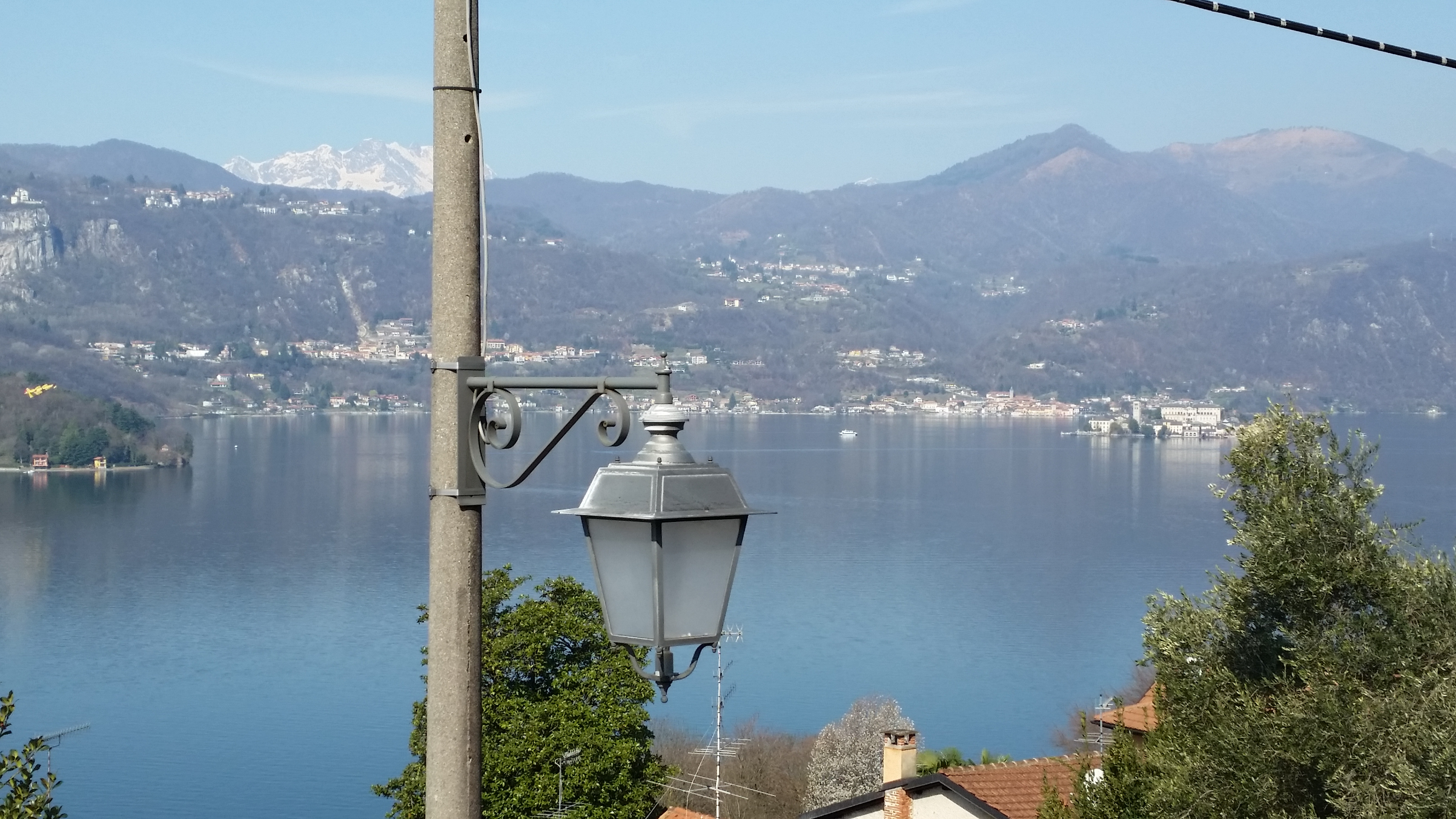
View from Corconio

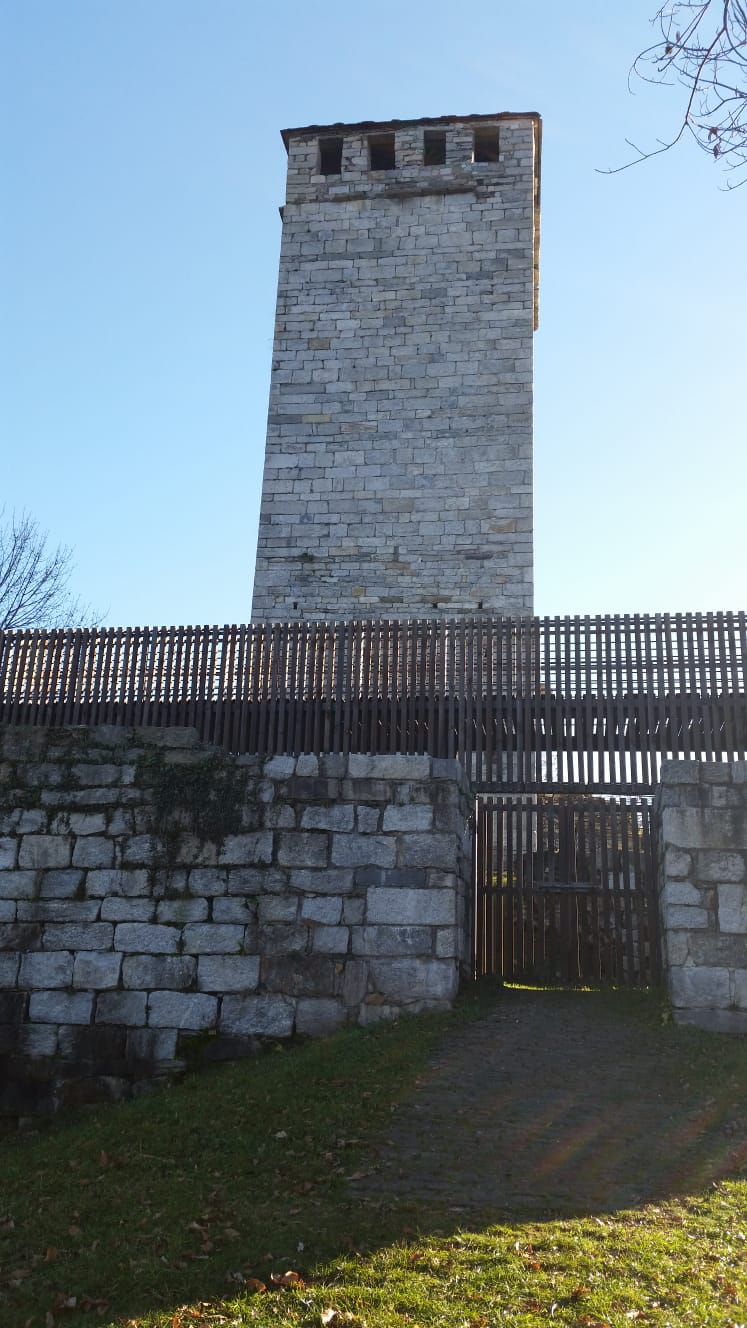
Tower of Buccione

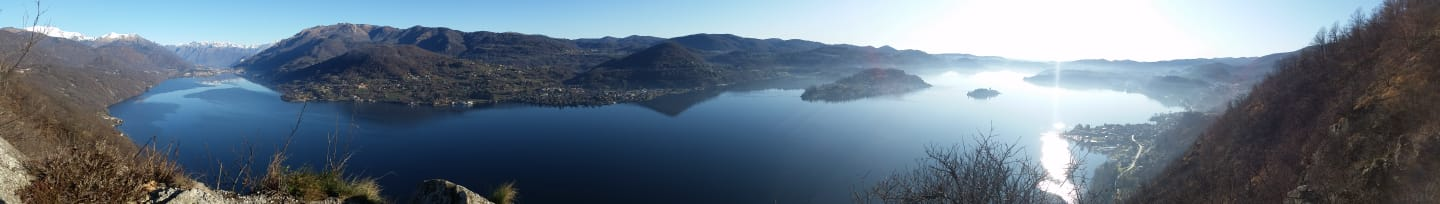
View from Croce di Egro

== See also ==
- Italian Lakes
- List of lakes of Italy
