= Orta San Giulio =

Orta San Giulio Òrta (Lombard)
- Comune
- Comune di Orta San Giulio
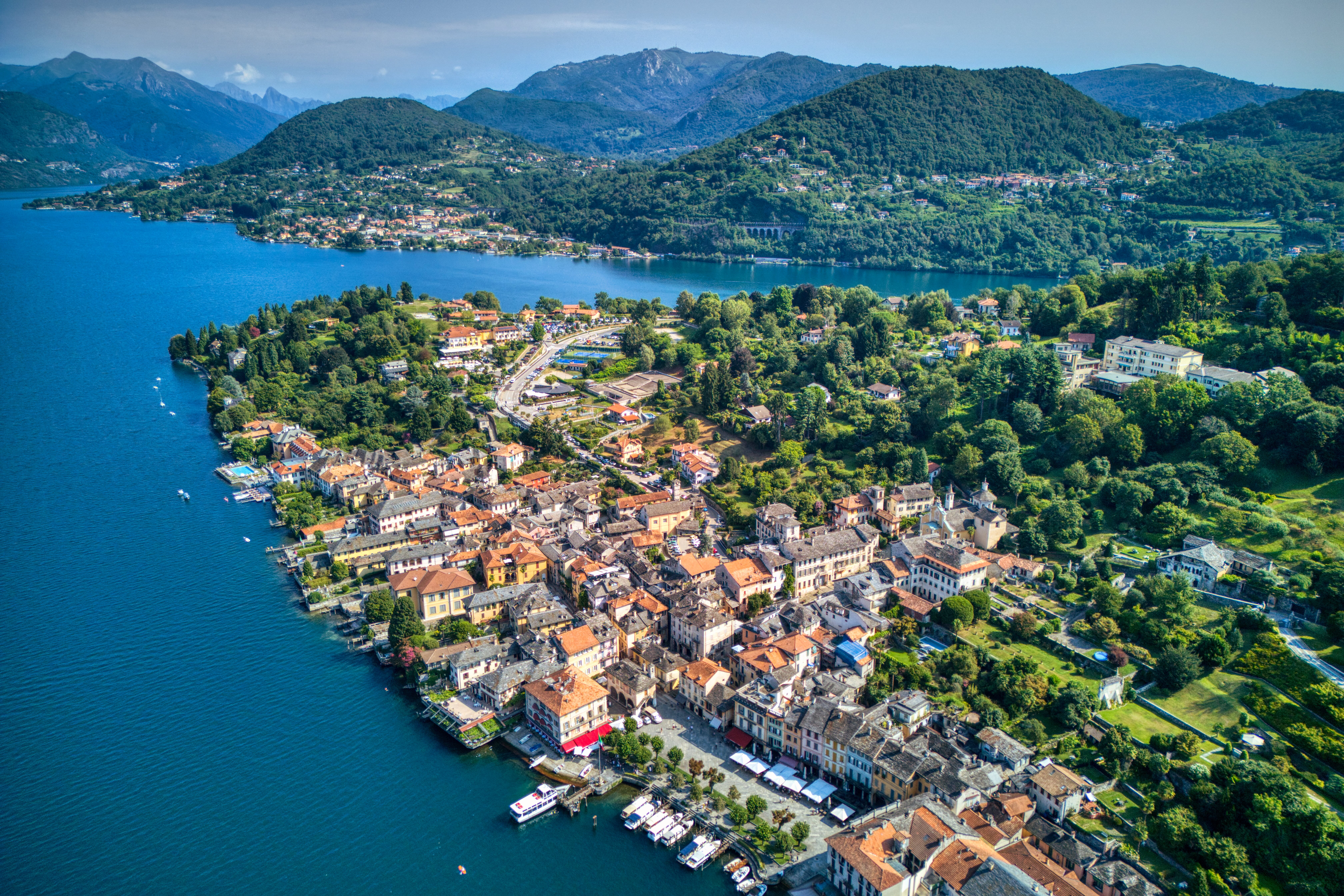
- View of Orta San Giulio

- Coat of arms

- Location within Italy Location within Piedmont
- Coordinates: 45°48′N 8°24′E
- Country: Italy
- Region: Piedmont
- Province: Novara (NO)
- Frazioni: Corconio, Imolo, Legro

Government
  - Mayor: Giorgio Angeleri

Area
  - Total: 6.8 km^{2} (2.6 sq mi)
- Elevation: 294 m (965 ft)

Population (31 July 2008)
  - Total: 1,161
  - Density: 170/km^{2} (440/sq mi)
- Demonym: Ortesi
- Time zone: UTC+1 (CET)
  - Summer (DST): UTC+2 (CEST)
- Postal code: 28016
- Dialing code: 0322
- Patron saint: St. Julius of Orta
- Saint day: January 31
- Website: Official website

Orta San Giulio (Piedmontese and Novarese: Òrta) is a town and comune (municipality) in the Province of Novara in the Italian region of Piedmont, located about 100 kilometres (62 mi) northeast of Turin and about 40 kilometres (25 mi) northwest of Novara. It is one of I Borghi più belli d'Italia ("The most beautiful villages of Italy").

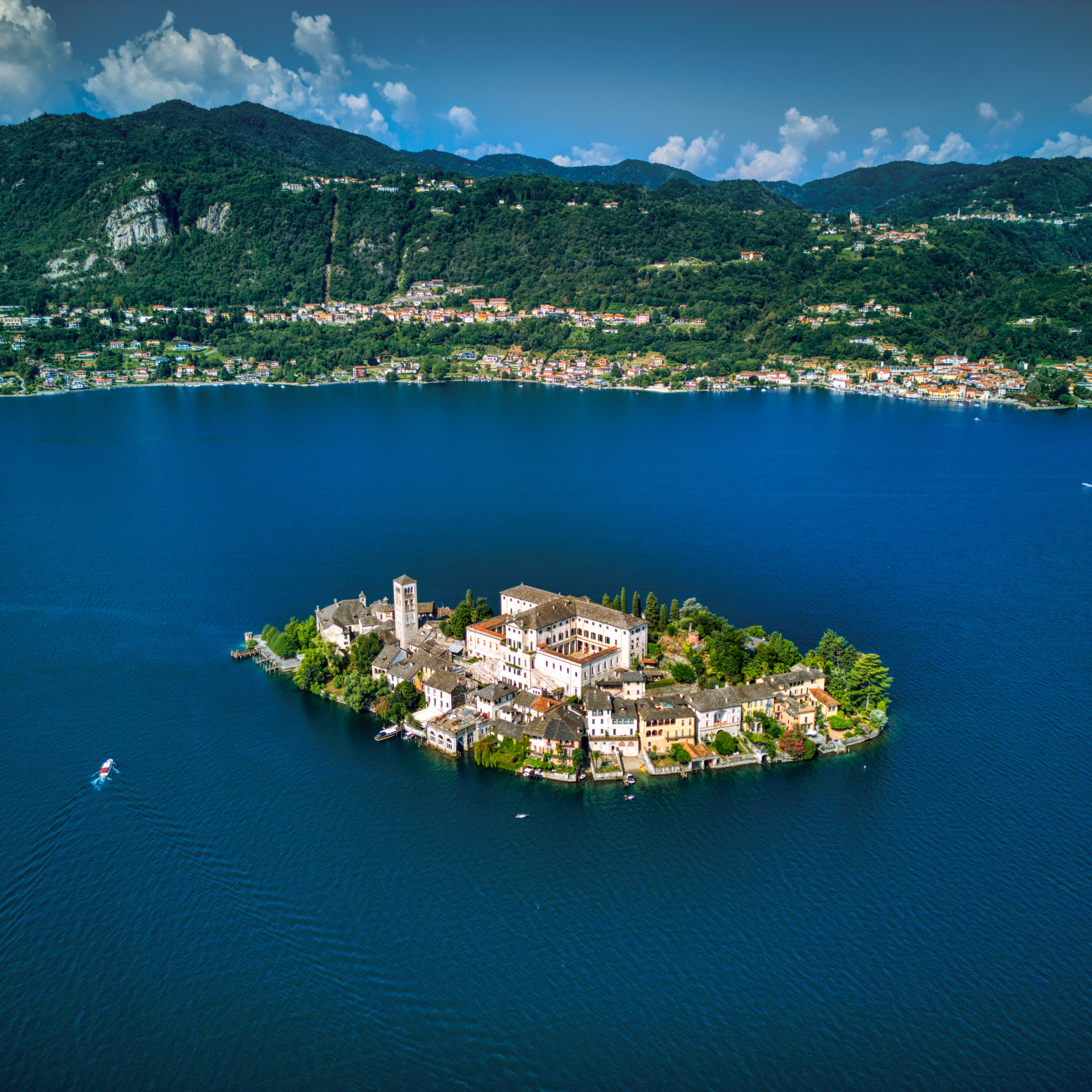
San Giulio Island

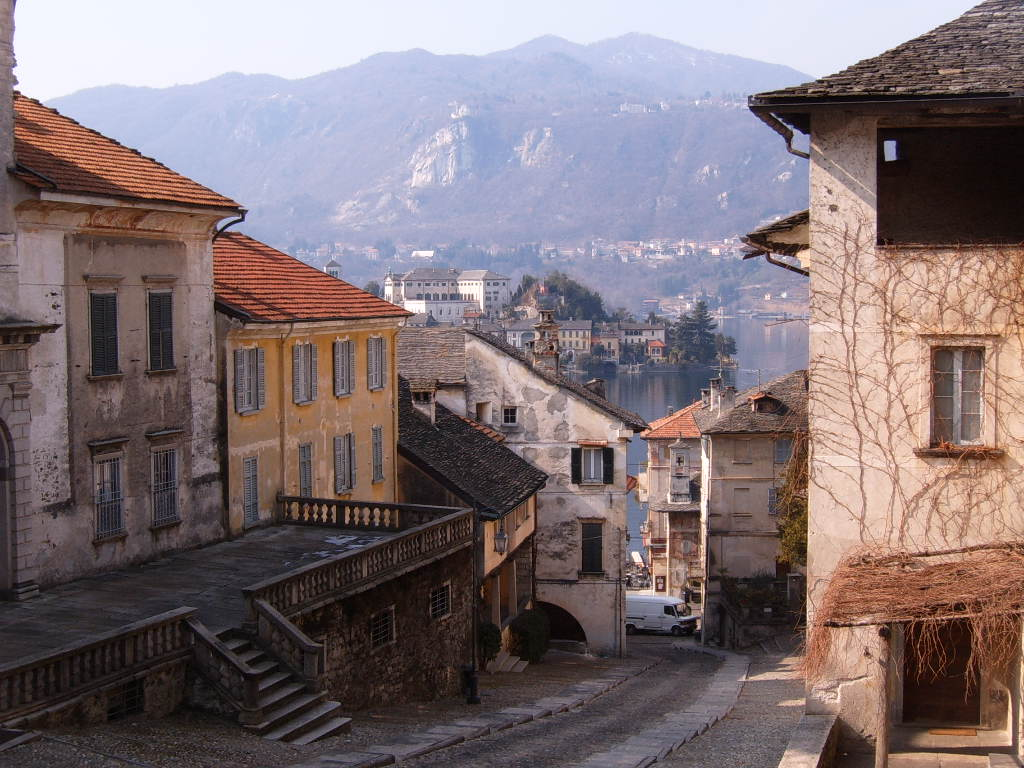
View of the town

The town itself is built on a promontory which juts out from the eastern bank of Lake Orta close to San Giulio Island, an island which also falls within the municipal boundaries. The frazione of Legro stands on the hill which rises behind the promontory, Corconio is some 2 kilometres (1.2 mi) further south, and again away from the lake, while Imola consists of a small number of dwellings between the two, but close to the lake on the road leading to Gozzano. The municipality borders on Pettenasco to the north, Miasino and Ameno to the east, Bolzano Novarese and Gozzano to the south, and San Maurizio d'Opaglio and Pella to the west across the lake.

It is well known for the nearby Sacro Monte, which is a site of pilgrimage and worship and, like the town itself and the island, is a popular destination for fairly small-scale tourism. In 2003, the Sacro Monte of Orta was inserted by UNESCO in the World Heritage List.

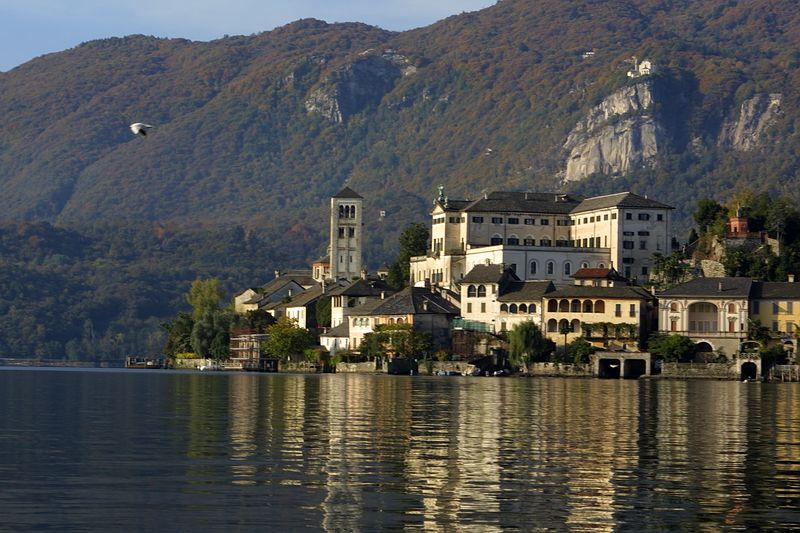
View of Orta San Giulio

In May 1882, Friedrich Nietzsche and Lou Andreas-Salomé, accompanied by her mother and a mutual friend, visited Orta for a few days on their way back from a Grand Tour of Italy. The couple visited the Sacro Monte for some hours and Nietzsche fell in love with the charming Russian. Salomé could not afterwards remember if she had kissed the philosopher and she was not in love with him, a fact which caused him much anguish.

== Main sights ==
Main sights include the Broletto, the Palazzo Penotti Ubertini, Villa Crespi and the Sacro Monte di Orta.

=== Villa Crespi ===
Villa Crespi is a 19th-century Moorish revival-style rural palace located in Orta, and is now a luxury hotel and restaurant managed by chef and restaurateur Antonino Cannavacciuolo. Cristoforo Benigno Crespi, the original owner who commissioned the mansion as his family holiday home, wanted the villa to remind him of the buildings he saw during his working trips to the Middle East. Therefore, a minaret-looking tower overlooking the lake was included in the building.

In 1914, it was the location for the film Iwna, the Ganges' Pearl (original title Iwna, la perla del Gange) by Giuseppe Pinto.

=== Sacro Monte ===
The Sacro Monte of Orta is located within a historical park, which now is a nature reserve, of 13 hectares. It includes:

- 21 votive chapels dating back to the end of the 16th and 17th centuries with frescoes and terracotta sculptures narrating the life of Saint Francis of Assisi;
- 370 real dimension polychrome statues of terracotta realized by the best artists of the Lombard school, who also worked on the Milan Duomo;
- over 900 frescoes creating real theatrical representations.

The devotional path ends with the Church of Saint Francis and Nicolao, a proto-Romanic building that was then remodelled in the 17th century so that it would resemble the Lower Basilica of Assisi.

Sacro Monte of Orta was inspired by the nearby Sacro Monte of Varallo, which dates back to the end of the 15th century.

== Notable people ==
- Leonardo Benevolo, architect
- Gustavo Fara, military general and politician
- Giorgio Gorla, professional sailor
- Luca Rossetti, painter and architect
- Paola Saini, professional swimmer
- Vincenzo Spisanelli, painter
- Guglielmo Tagliacarne, statistician
- Saint William of Volpiano, monastic reformer and saint
