= Palazzo Borromeo (Milan) =

14th-century building in Milan, Italy

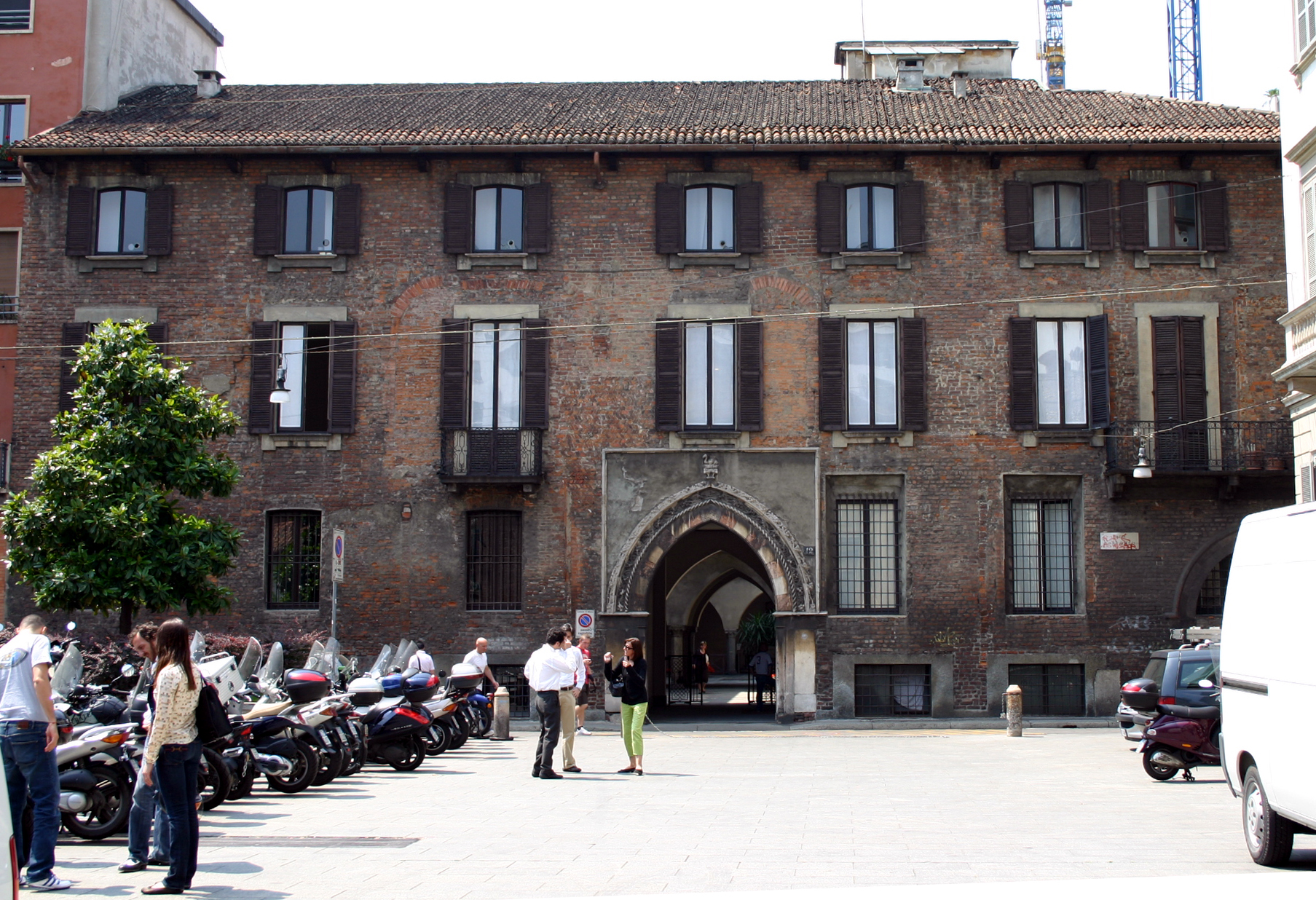
- Facade of the palace in Piazza Borromeo. The facade is late 14th-century, the portal is 15th century, and the windows are modern.

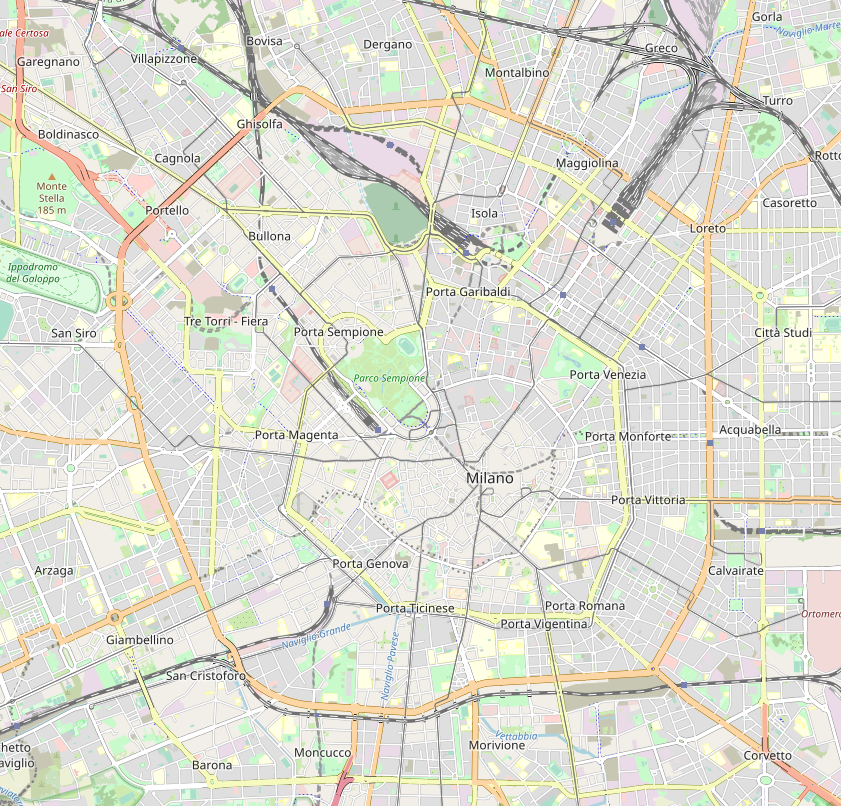
- Location within Milan Location within Italy

General information
- Architectural style: late Gothic
- Location: Milan, Italy
- Coordinates: 45.4634°N 9.1822°E
- Owner: Borromeo family

Palazzo Borromeo ("Borromeo Palace") is a 14th-century building located at piazza Borromeo 12 in Milan, region of Lombardy, Italy. It was built as the home and business headquarters of the Borromeo family, merchant-bankers from Tuscany. Some of the building complex was badly damaged during World War II in Allied bombings of 1943 but was reconstructed and restored to its 15th-century appearance. It contains an important fresco cycle from the 1440s and is one of the finest examples of a Milanese patrician palace from the early Renaissance.

== The Borromeo family in Milan ==
The Borromei initially lived in San Miniato, outside Florence, but when the head of the family, Filippo, was executed after a battle between San Miniato and Florence in 1370, his wife and five children fled. Sons Borromeo and Giovanni went to Milan, where they founded a bank, while others went into banking in Venice and Florence. At that time, Gian Galeazzo Visconti, duke of Milan from 1351 to 1402, was establishing relationships with a number of Tuscan merchant families to improve the finances of the duchy. With their business contacts throughout Italy, Spain, and northern Europe, the Borromei were of great use to the dukes of Milan.

The first generation of Borromeo bankers in Milan named as their heir the son of their sister, Margherita, who had married into the distinguished Vitaliano family of Padua. This nephew, Vitaliano Vitaliani (c. 1390-1449), became a Milanese citizen in 1416 and, at the death of his uncle Giovanni in 1431, took over the business and added the Borromeo name to his own. He was very successful in his mercantile and banking affairs and also served Duke Filippo Maria Visconti (ruled 1412-47) as state treasurer and counselor; for this, he was awarded the title of Count of Arona in 1445 and was given a large amount of property outside Milan; the family at one time possessed the entire area around Lago Maggiore.

When Francesco Sforza, son-in-law of Filippo Maria Visconti, became duke of Milan in 1450, Vitaliano's son, Filippo, continued to serve the ducal family, and Francesco named him count of Peschiera. The Borromeo businesses also flourished: Filippo opened branches in Bruges, London, and Barcelona. The wealth and success of the Borromei continued throughout the centuries. They also provided the church with seven cardinals, including Charles (canonized in 1610) and Federico. In the 18th century, Count Carlo (1657-1734) added Arese, from his maternal line, to the family name. In 1916 they were created princes of Angera by King Victor Emmanuel III of Italy, a title still held by the head of the Borromeo Arese family.

== The Casa Borromeo ==
=== The early building ===
The earliest section of the house was built in the later 14th century, soon after the Borromei arrived in Milan, to serve as both residence and place of business. On its plain brick walls, between the modern windows, the facade on piazza Borromeo still shows evidence of the original windows and doors, which were of various sizes and shapes and placed haphazardly according to where light and access were needed inside the building. Later visitors were surprised at the humble appearance of the home of such a wealthy and illustrious family. In medieval and Renaissance Milan, however, prestige was calculated by a family's age and service to the city, not by its wealth or rank – the older a family, the humbler its beginnings. The more prominent citizens referred to themselves only as patrizi (patricians), not nobility, and conspicuous consumption was frowned upon. The unremarkable exteriors of houses gave no clue to the status of the inhabitants. In fact, until the 18th century, the term "palace" was only given to homes of rulers or government buildings; all others, large or small, were called case (houses). The Borromei fit easily into this culture, and the "Casa Borromeo" (Borromeo House) blended perfectly into the city.

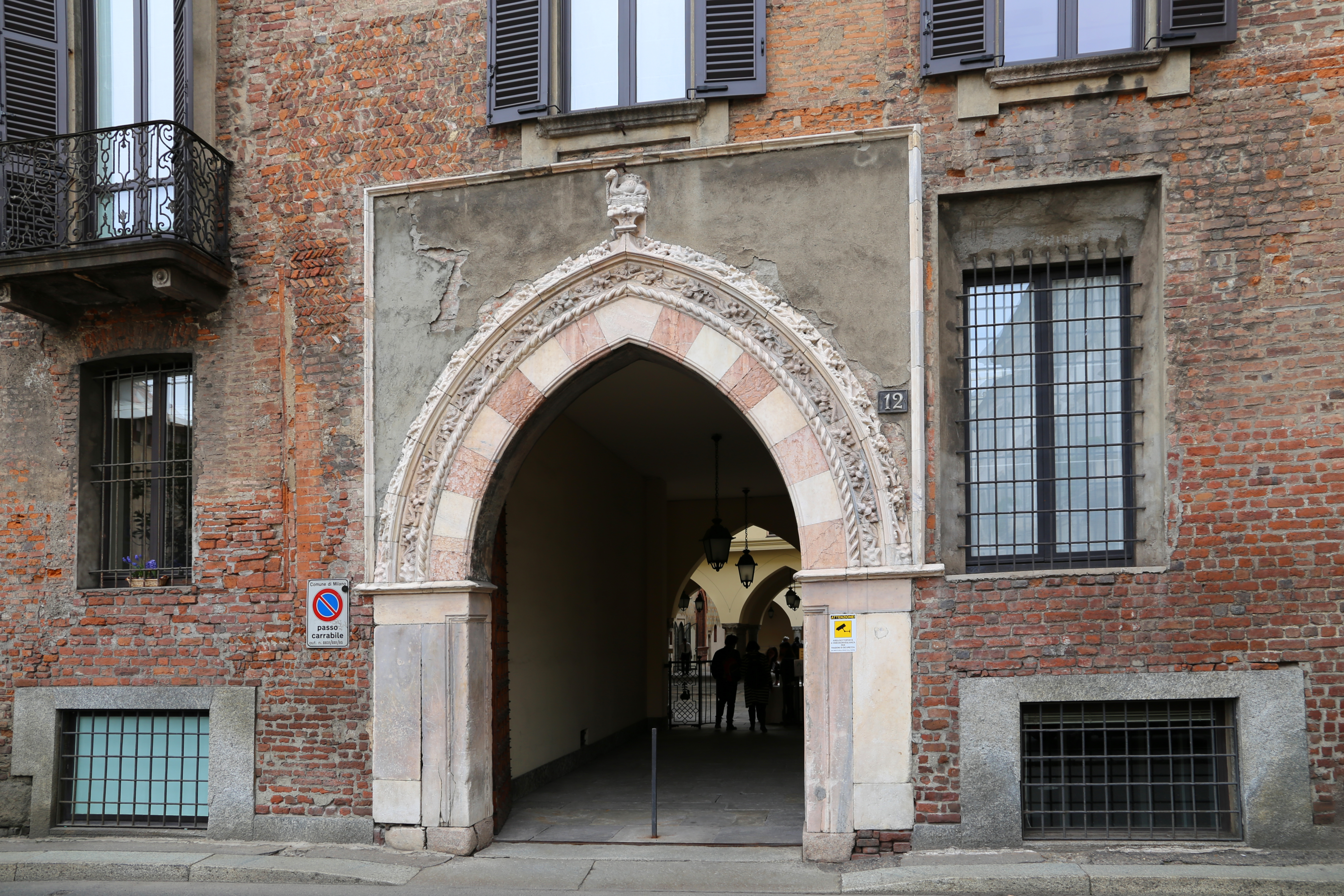
Casa Borromeo, 15th-century portal

=== The 15th century ===
Substantial additions were made to the Casa Borromeo in Vitaliano's time, but the original late Gothic facade was retained; it has undergone several modifications through the centuries (most notably after bomb damage in World War II). The main feature of the facade is the large doorway commissioned by Vitaliano, an elegant portal in the center of the main facade, skillfully carved with a decoration of vines and oak-leaf clusters. This has a pointed arch adopted from French Gothic architecture; the Visconti dukes had intermarried with the French royal family, and French style was very popular in the duchy. The marble of the portal proclaimed the status of the Borromei: there were few quarries on the flat plain of the Po River that ran through Lombardy, and only the very wealthy could afford to import marble from the foothills of the Alps. The alternating stones of the archivolt are red marble from Verona and pink marble from Candoglia, the latter from a quarry whose output was (and still is) reserved by law for the construction of the Duomo (cathedral) of Milan; only a family highly favored by the dukes would be able to secure even small blocks of that stone. On the top of the door is a figure of a crowned camel in a basket, signifying the Borromei's far-reaching and exotic trade. A rectangular area surrounding the top of the portal was once painted with a scene of the Annunciation, with the archangel Gabriel on one side and the Virgin Mary on the other. Though damaged and faded over the years, it was still visible until 1943.

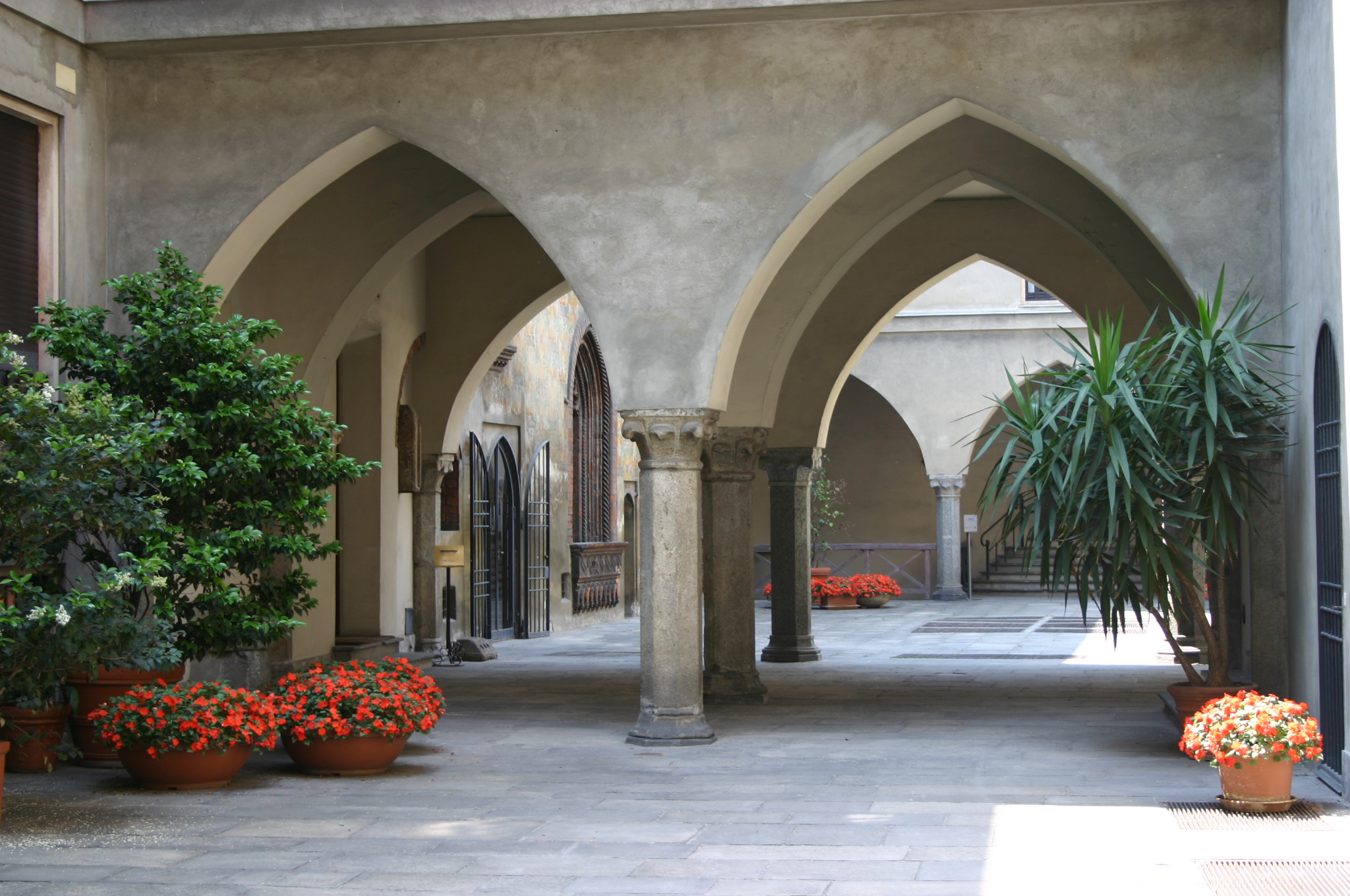
View from the front courtyard into the inner court

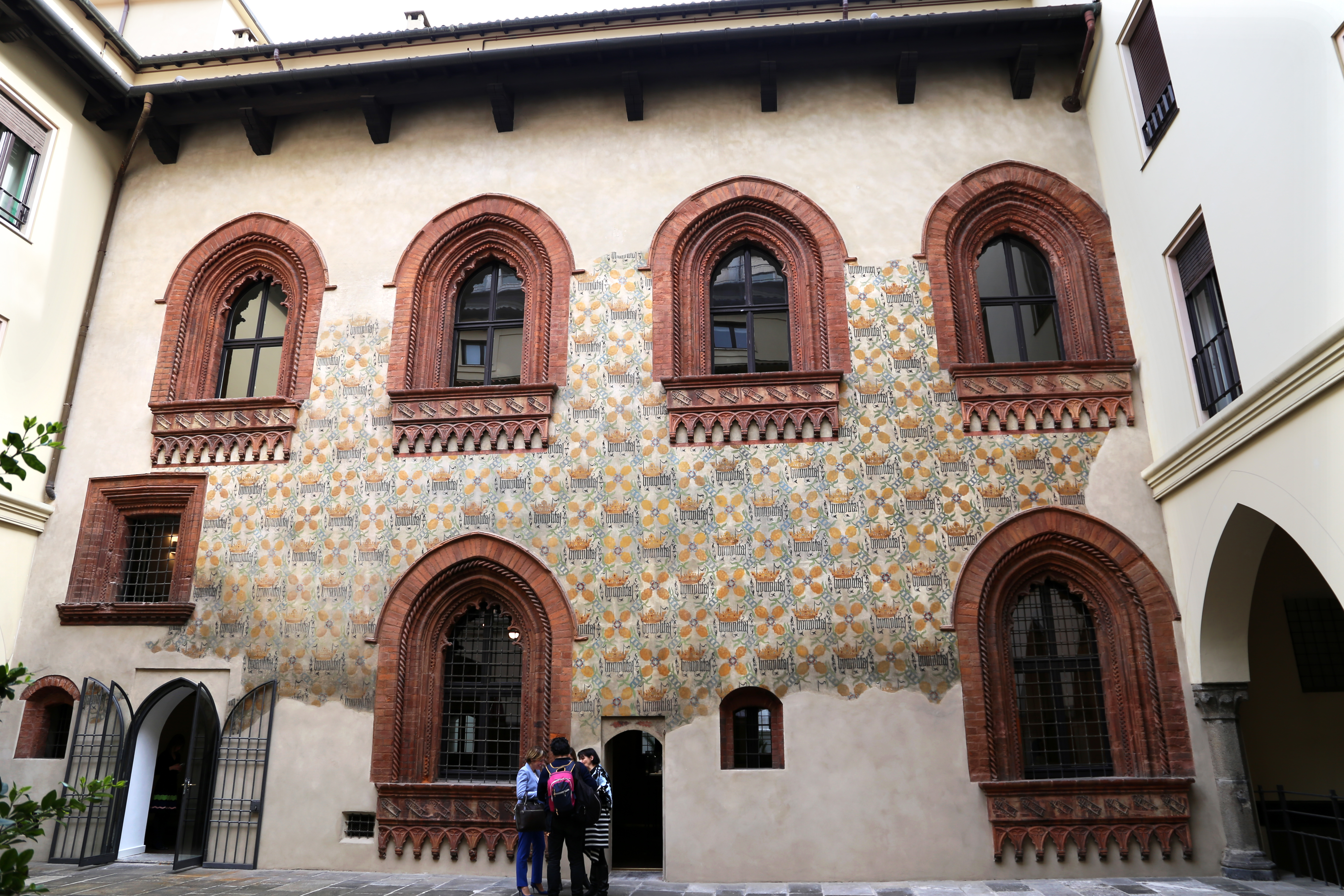
The palazzina with terracotta-framed windows and heraldic fresco decoration

Also in Vitaliano's time, two courtyard wings were constructed behind the older building: the first, a small service court, was for horses, merchandise, and business transactions, while the second court, behind it, is larger and functioned as the formal entrance space to the house (cortile d'onore) for the family and their guests. The columns forming porticoes in the courtyards (severely damaged in 1943 and restored) are short and sturdy, carved from serizzo (a type of granite), with capitals of large, stylized leaves; they also carry pointed arches and echo the shape and proportion of the main portal. The inner courtyard is the part of the house that is best preserved; some of the original frescoes on the walls are still visible. In the courtyard itself, frescoes on the three walls above the porticoes were badly damaged. On the fourth side is a building called the palazzina (little palace), which fortunately retains most of its decoration. Six large arched windows and one small square window adorn its two-story facade, with elaborate terracotta frames characteristic of the period in Lombardy. The brick wall of the palazzina was plastered and painted with a colorful repeating pattern of a count's coronet, groups of rings (a heraldic motif), and the Borromeo motto, humilitas (humility).

No specific architect has ever been credited with the 15th-century work on the Casa Borromeo, but the family's account books record payments in 1450 to the prominent Milanese architect Giovanni Solari (c. 1400-82) for services rendered on Borromeo property, and, indeed, features of the expanded building are in his style.

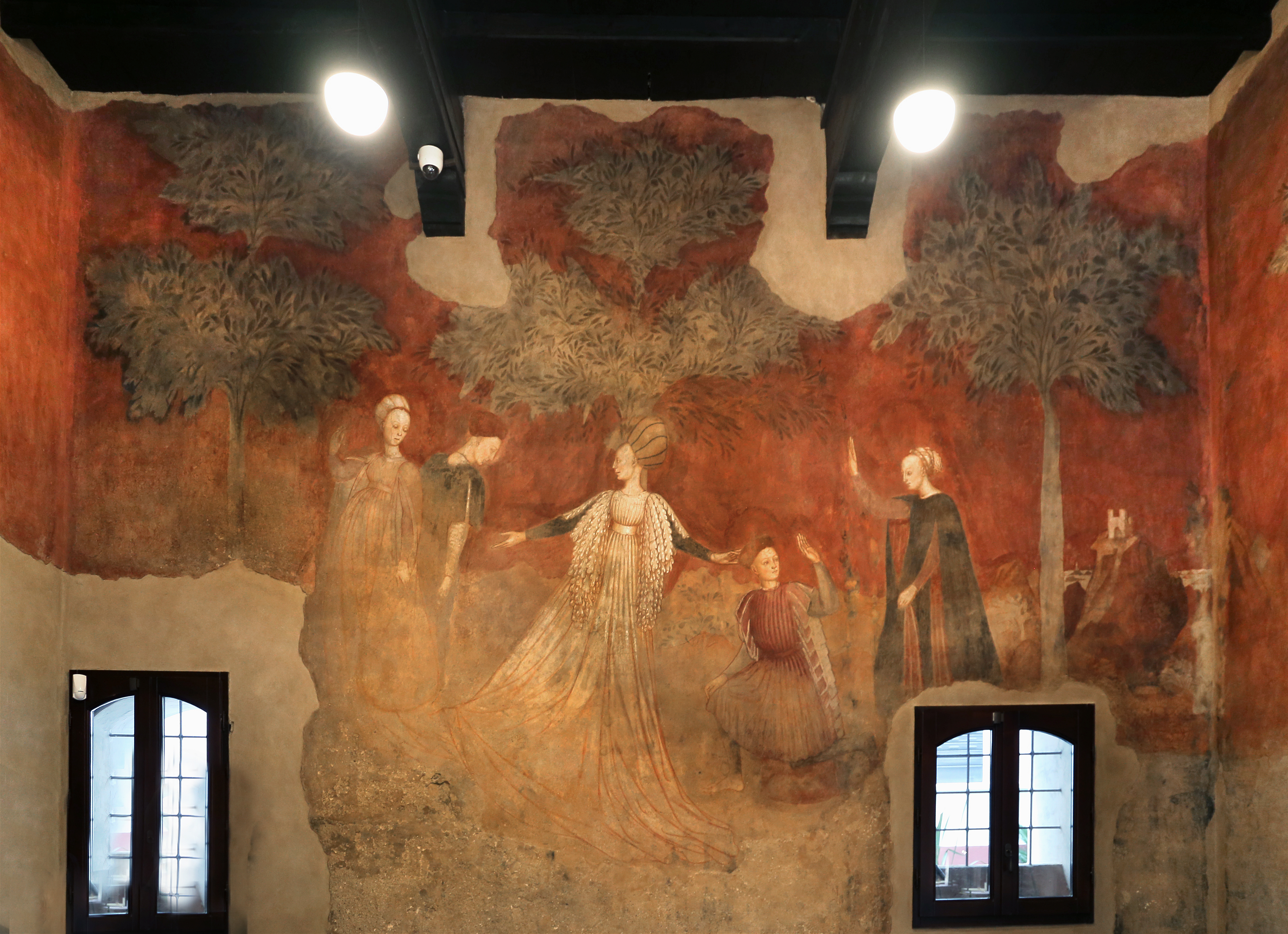
Fresco in the Sala dei Giochi Borromeo: the game of palma

When the restoration of Casa Borromeo took place in the 1950s under the direction of architect and archaeologist Ferdinando Reggiori, a number of fresco decorations were found inside the palazzina. Recovered fragments of paintings in the Sala delle storie di Esopo (Room of Aesop's Fables), attributed to Lombard artist Michelino da Besozzo, were taken to another Borromeo residence, the Rocca di Angera. Three walls of frescoes (the fourth was destroyed in 1943) were found in good condition in a large hall now called the Sala dei Giochi Borromeo (Room of the Borromeo Games) and have remained in place. Representing the type of entertainment held by the Borromeo, they depict elegantly dressed ladies and gentlemen indulging in leisure-time activities in a beautiful garden; some play tarrocchi (tarot), others participate in a ball game, while a third group gracefully executes dance-like movements in the game of palma. The style and costumes date the paintings to the 1440s, but the painter is unknown. The frescoes have been attributed over the years to the foreign masters Pisanello and Masolino da Panicale, but most scholars believe they were executed by a Lombard artist; the Zavattari family, Cristoforo Moretti, Giovanni Zenone da Vaprio, and Michelino da Besozzo have all been suggested. The frescoes inspired similar decoration in other Lombard palaces.

=== Later history ===
Casa Borromeo played an active role in the life of the city. There are accounts of numerous celebrations and events such as tournaments, festivals, and other public events taking place in the piazza (now piazza Borromeo) that Vitaliano created in front of his home. During the 19th century, the Borromeo Arese art collections were installed in the building for public display, and for a time the back section of the house served as the Direzione Generale (headquarters) of the Milanese police. The palace is still the property of the Borromeo family; it remained their home until 1943; it is now divided into offices, studios, and apartments.

== Santa Maria Podone ==
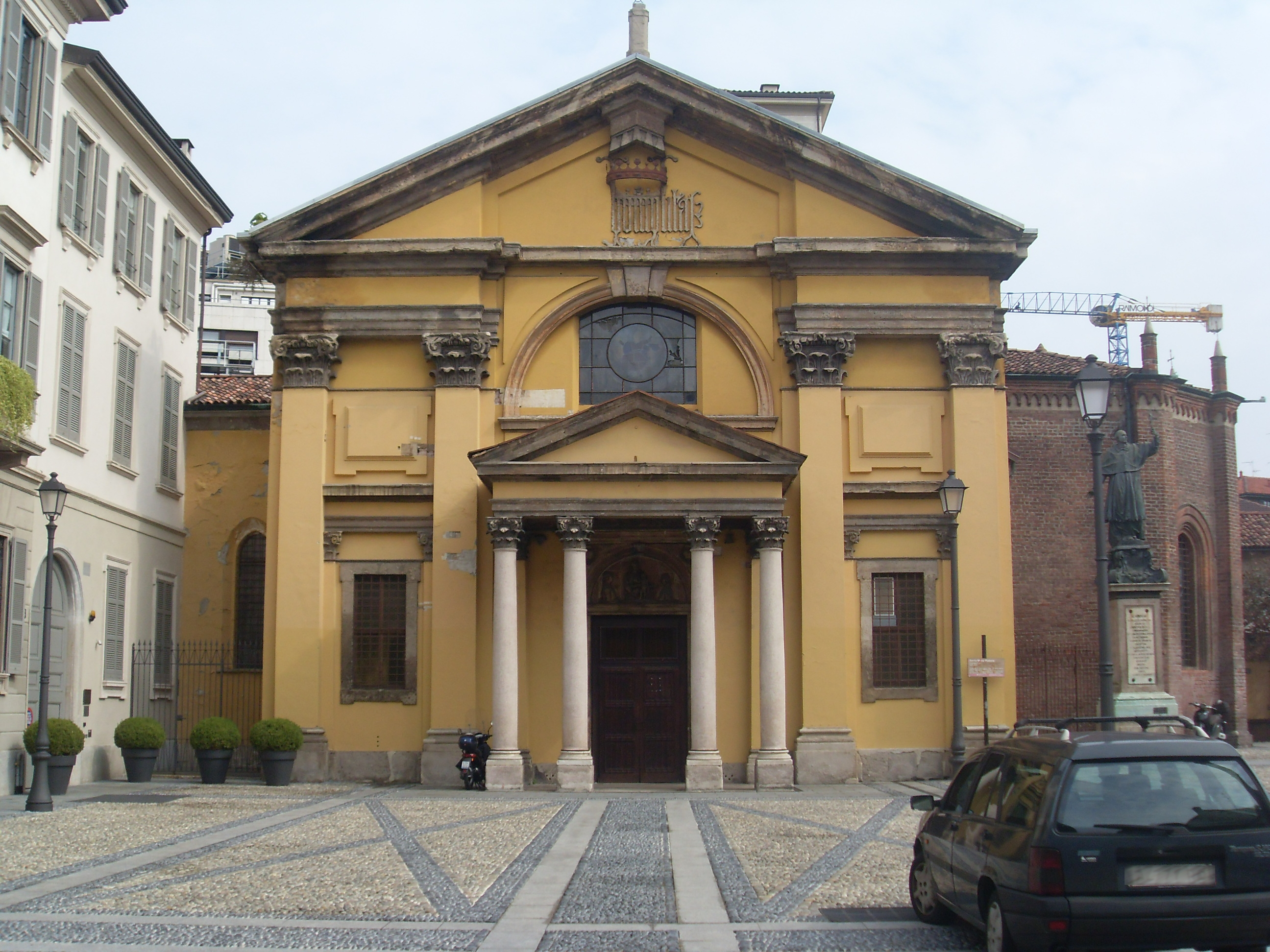
The church of Santa Maria Podone, with the Borromeo motto "humilitas" in the pediment and a statue of Saint Charles Borromeo to the right.

The Casa Borromeo stands across the piazza from the church of Santa Maria Podone, whose history is bound up with that of the Borromei. Founded in 871, the building was remodeled and extended after the family was given the patronage of the church in 1442. Architects of the Solari family added a large chapel for the Borromei on the right side of the church, now the Chapel of the Holy Family. In 1495/1500, sculptor Cristoforo Luvoni carved a lunette over the main door of the church depicting the Virgin and Child between father and son, Vitaliano and Filippo. A new facade built in 1626-30 by Fabio Mangone prominently featured the "Humilitas" motto with the count's coronet above the main portico. In 2012, the church was granted to the Orthodox Church of Italy.

To the right of the church's entrance, a copper statue of 1691 by Dionigi Bussola depicts Saint Charles Borromeo (1538-1584), Cardinal-Archbishop of Milan, the most famous and revered member of the family.

== Bibliography ==
- Bascapè, Giacomo Carlo, and Carlo Perogalli, Palazzi privati di Lombardia. Milan: Electa, 1965.
- Caroselli, Susan L. The Casa Marliani and Palace Building in Late Quattrocento Lombardy. New York: Garland, 1985.
- Gamberini, Andrea, ed. A Companion to Late Medieval and Early Modern Milan: The Distinctive Features of an Italian City. Leiden: Brill, 2014.
- Heydenreich, Ludwig H. "Lombardy." In Heydenreich and Wolfgang Lotz, Architecture in Italy, 1400-1600, 96-113. Translated by Mary Hottinger. Harmondsworth, UK: Penguin Books, 1974.
- Lanza, Attilia. Milano e i suoi palazzi: Porta Vercellina, Comasina e Nuova. Milan: Meravigli, 1993.
- Paoletti, John T. "The Banco Mediceo in Milan: Urban Politics and Family Power." The Journal of Medieval and Early Modern Studies 24, no. 2 (1994): 199-238.
