= Agostino Comerio =

Italian painter (1784–1834)

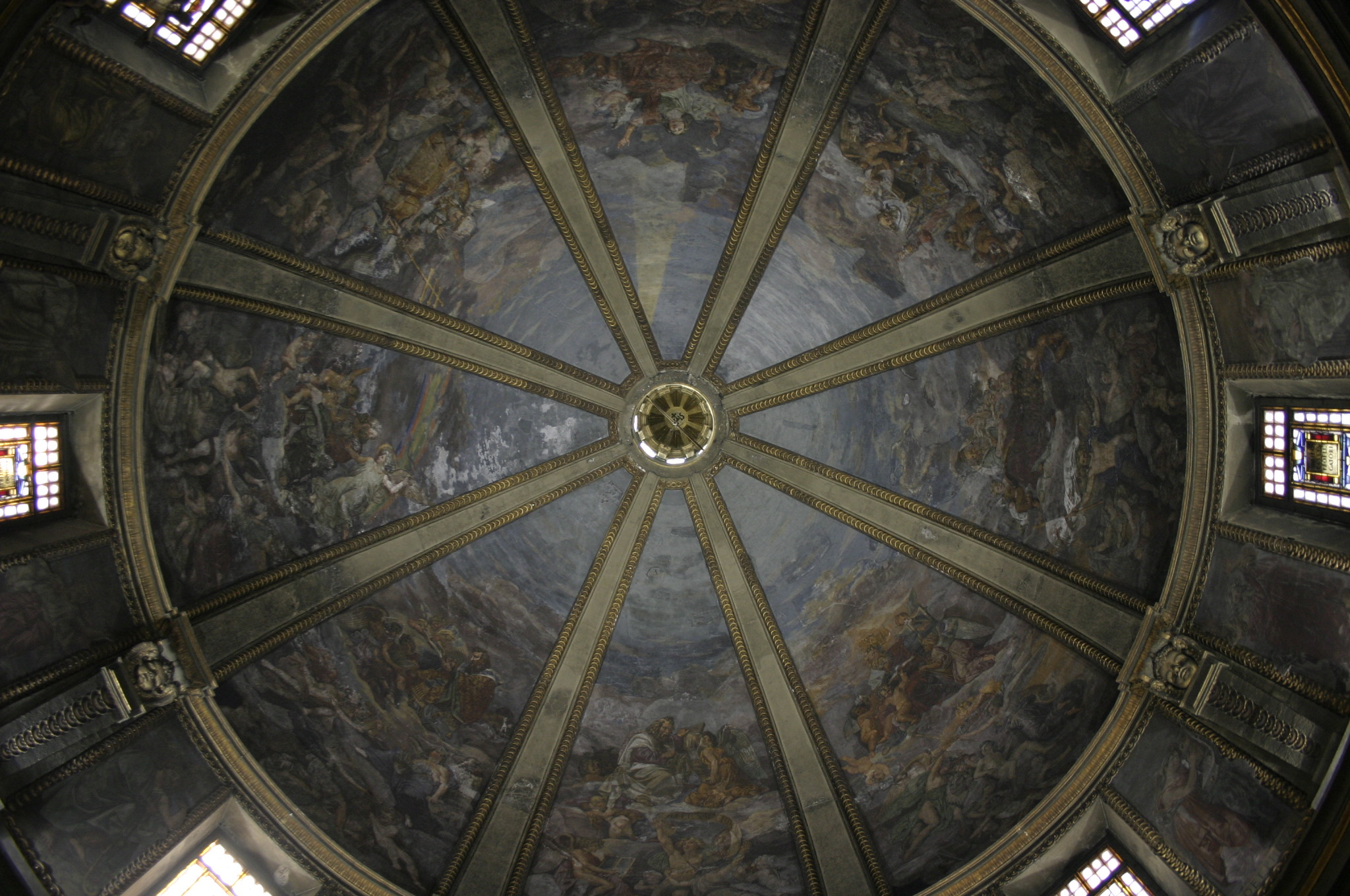
The dome of San Sebastiano in Milan

Agostino Comerio (12 May 1784 – 5 August 1834) was an Italian painter, active mainly in Northern Italy.

== Life and career ==
He was born in Locate, near Como, to Filippo Comerio, a painter from Milan and Lauretana Benini of Faenza. He apprenticed under his father. In 1800, he moved to Milan, and attended the academy of art. Under the patronage of Cardinal Dugnani, he stayed in Rome in 1803–1805 to study painting; in 1805 he won the first prize in the Accademia del Campidoglio, which was then led by Antonio Canova.

In 1806 he gained a government scholarship. He returned to Lombardy in 1810, and sculpted some statues for the Cathedral of Milan. He was recruited to Mantua as a designer of the works of Giulio by the philanthropic committee established by Count Miollis, including models for a large bronze sculpture for St. Andrew, never cast. In 1814 he traveled to Paris and London. Returning to Verona, he decorated the apartments of the Count Erbisti, the Marquis Giovanni Pindemonte, the Marquis di Fracastoro, and others.

He engraved Brusasorci's Cavalcade of Clement VII and Charles V. He continued to receive commissions in Vicenza, Milan, and Lombardy. He painted in fresco in San Satiro in Milan and in the Santuario della Madonna della Bocciola in Ameno near the Lago d'Orta.

In 1823 he exhibited a canvas of Blind Oedipus in Exile, followed in 1824 by a Death of Raphael, which were sold to Russian patrons. He also worked in the restoration of paintings of the Certosa di Pavia. He made a portrait of Empress Maria Theresa. He painted various altarpieces. In 1827, he was appointed professor of figural elements at the Accademia Braidense, replacing Domenico Aspari; in the following year he made studies of Leonardo Da Vinci's The Last Supper. He served as a judge in various committees evaluating industry.

Despite developing cardiac dropsy, he began designs and frescoes for the cupola of the Pellegrino Tibaldi church of San Sebastiano in Milan.

== Sources ==
- Boni, Filippo de' (1852). Biografia degli artisti ovvero dizionario della vita e delle opere dei pittori, degli scultori, degli intagliatori, dei tipografi e dei musici di ogni nazione che fiorirono da'tempi più remoti sino á nostri giorni. Seconda Edizione. Venice; Googlebooks: Presso Andrea Santini e Figlio. pp. 239–240.
- Entry in Treccani Encyclopedia
