= Francesco Corneliani =

Italian painter (1740–1815)

Francesco Corneliani (1740–1815) was an Italian painter, mainly active in a Neoclassic style in his native Milan.

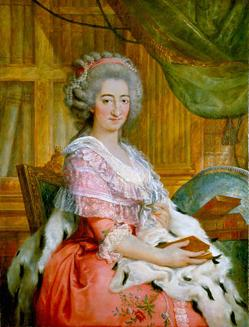
Maria Beatrice d'Este, Archduchess of Austria

He was born to Carlo Corneliani (or Corneliano), and was intended to become a jeweller. He trained under Sangiorgi at the Accademia Ambrosiana. In 1760, influenced by the paintings of Anton Rafael Mengs, he left for Parma and worked under Carlo Calani. He returned to Milan where he painted lunette frescoes in the Casa Candiani.

He also painted the lunettes over the altars to the side of the chorus in the church of San Sebastiano. He made portraits of the family in the walls of the house of Castiglioni. He painted the four evangelists for the church of San Gervasio in Bergamo.

He was a close friend of Andrea Appiani and is described as a man alien to intrigue and vanity, pious without ostentation, he lived retired but always ready to work on works of art and piety He died in Milan.
