= Santa Maria Podone =

Church in Milan, Italy

Coordinates: 45°16′30″N 9°06′21″E

Church of Saint Mary Podone (Chiesa di Santa Maria Podone)
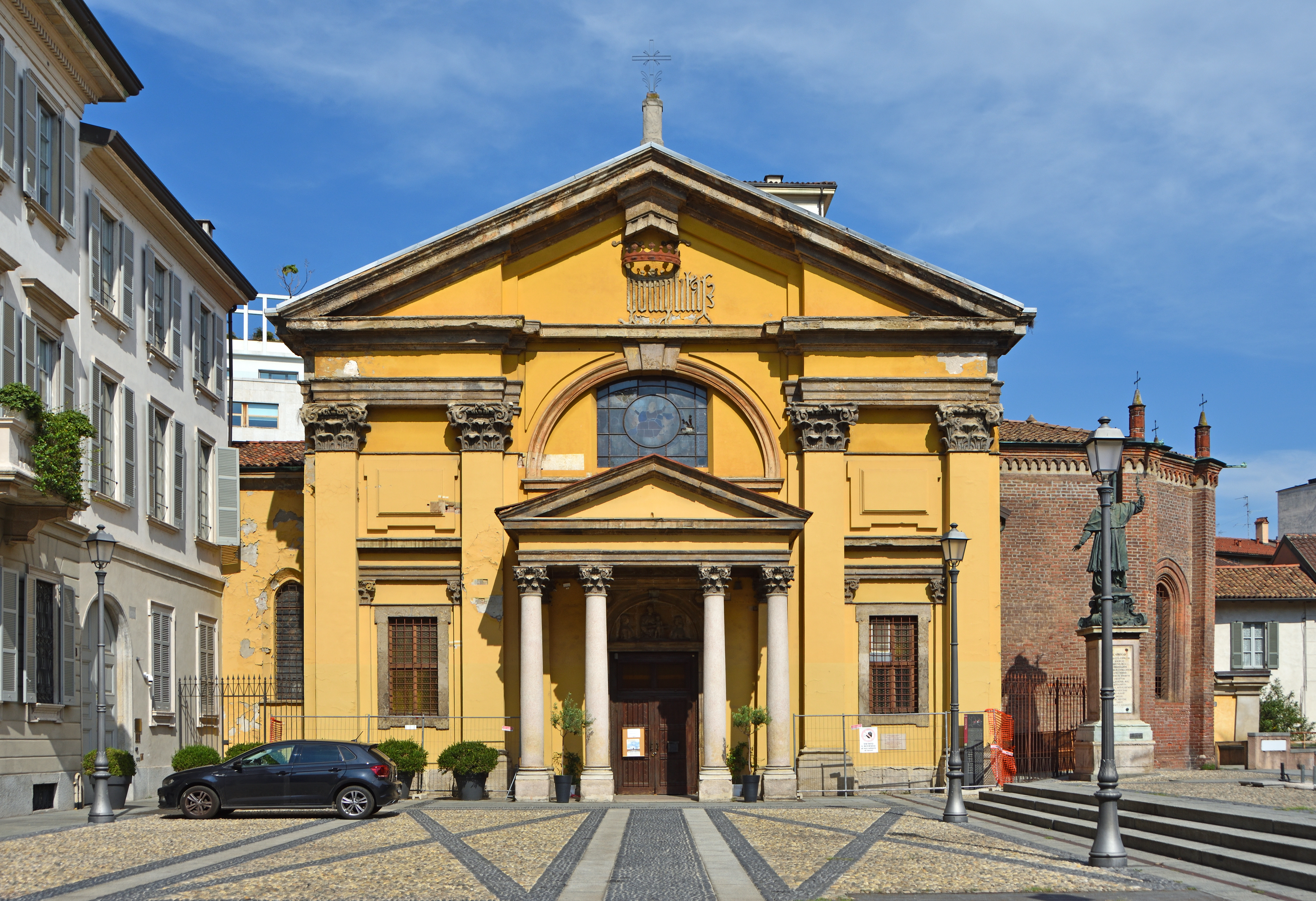
- Façade of the church

Religion
- Affiliation: Greek Orthodox
- Province: Milan
- Status: Active

Location
- Location: Milan, Italy
- Interactive map of Church of Saint Mary Podone (Chiesa di Santa Maria Podone)

Architecture
- Type: Church
- Style: Gothic; Baroque
- Groundbreaking: 871
- Completed: 16c

Santa Maria Podone is a small Greek Orthodox church in central Milan, region of Lombardy, Italy.

== History ==
A church on the site was first established in 871, it was a donation by a nobleman by the Surname of Podone or Pedone; henceforth, its name. Putatively he was a soldier in the army of Charlemagne. The church has undergone at least two major reconstructions: once in 1440, when it was rebuilt in Gothic style, and the church we see today, reconstructed under the archbishop Federico Borromeo starting in 1625. For example, the facade was designed by Fabio Mangone from 1628 to 1634 with the two tall Corinthian pilasters. The portico was added in later centuries. In the center of the facade, above the window is the Latin word for "humility" below two crowns, part of the crest of the Borromeo family, whose main family palace in Milan stands across the square. In front of the church is a statue of Saint Charles Borromeo by Dionigi Bussola.

Inside the apse chapel on the right, was dedicated to the Holy Family, and was a private chapel for the Borromeo family. On the left there is a small chapel designed in 1859 by Carlo Cerada and dedicated to the Madonna del Parto (Our Lady of Childbirth) with a fresco above the altar attributed to Michelino da Besozzo. On the right of the nave is an altar dedicated to Saint Renato, which contains his relics. The Organ was constructed by Eugenio Biroldi in 1827. The polychrome marble main altar dates to 1625–1629. The Italian scientist Ruggero Boscovich was buried in the church of Santa Maria Podone on 13 February 1787.
