= Carlo Calani =

Italian painter and sculptor

- Born: Italy
- Died: 1812; Italy
- Known for: Painting

Carlo Calani (died 1812) was an Italian painter and sculptor, active in Parma in the late 18th century.

He painted the main altarpiece for the church of Colorno, the statue of St Anthony of Parma, and helped decorate with forty caryatids the great neoclassic hall (Hall of the Caryatids) in the Royal Palace of Milan. Francesco Corneliani was one of his pupils.

== Sources ==
- Boni, Filippo de' (1852). Biografia degli artisti ovvero dizionario della vita e delle opere dei pittori, degli scultori, degli intagliatori, dei tipografi e dei musici di ogni nazione che fiorirono da'tempi più remoti sino á nostri giorni. Seconda Edizione.. Venice; Googlebooks: Presso Andrea Santini e Figlio. pp. 166–167.
