= Domenico Aspari =

Italian painter and engraver

Domenico Aspari (4 August 1746 – 8 April 1831) was an Italian painter and engraver.

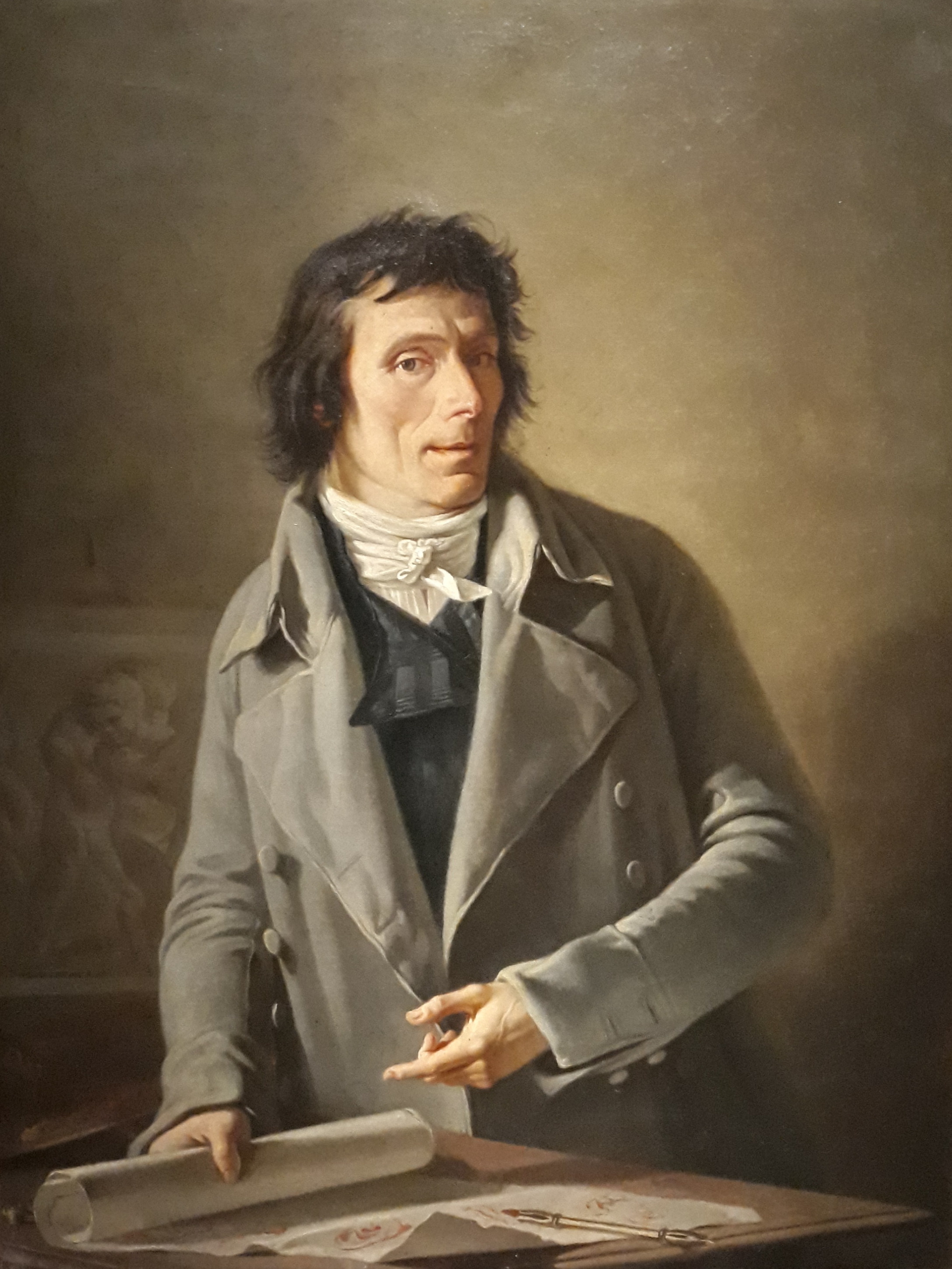
Domenico Aspari

== Life ==
Aspari was born in Milan in 1746, and studied under Valdrighi in Parma, where he executed some decorative paintings for the Ducal Palace. On his return to Milan, he almost entirely gave up painting in order to devote his attention to engraving, forming his style from that of Piranesi: in this branch of art he was very successful. His masterpiece of painting is the Madonna and Child enthroned, with Saints, which he executed for the church of Osnago. His self-portrait is in the Pinacoteca di Brera in Milan. He was a professor of painting at the Brera Academy. He died in 1831, and was replaced by Agostino Comerio as professor.

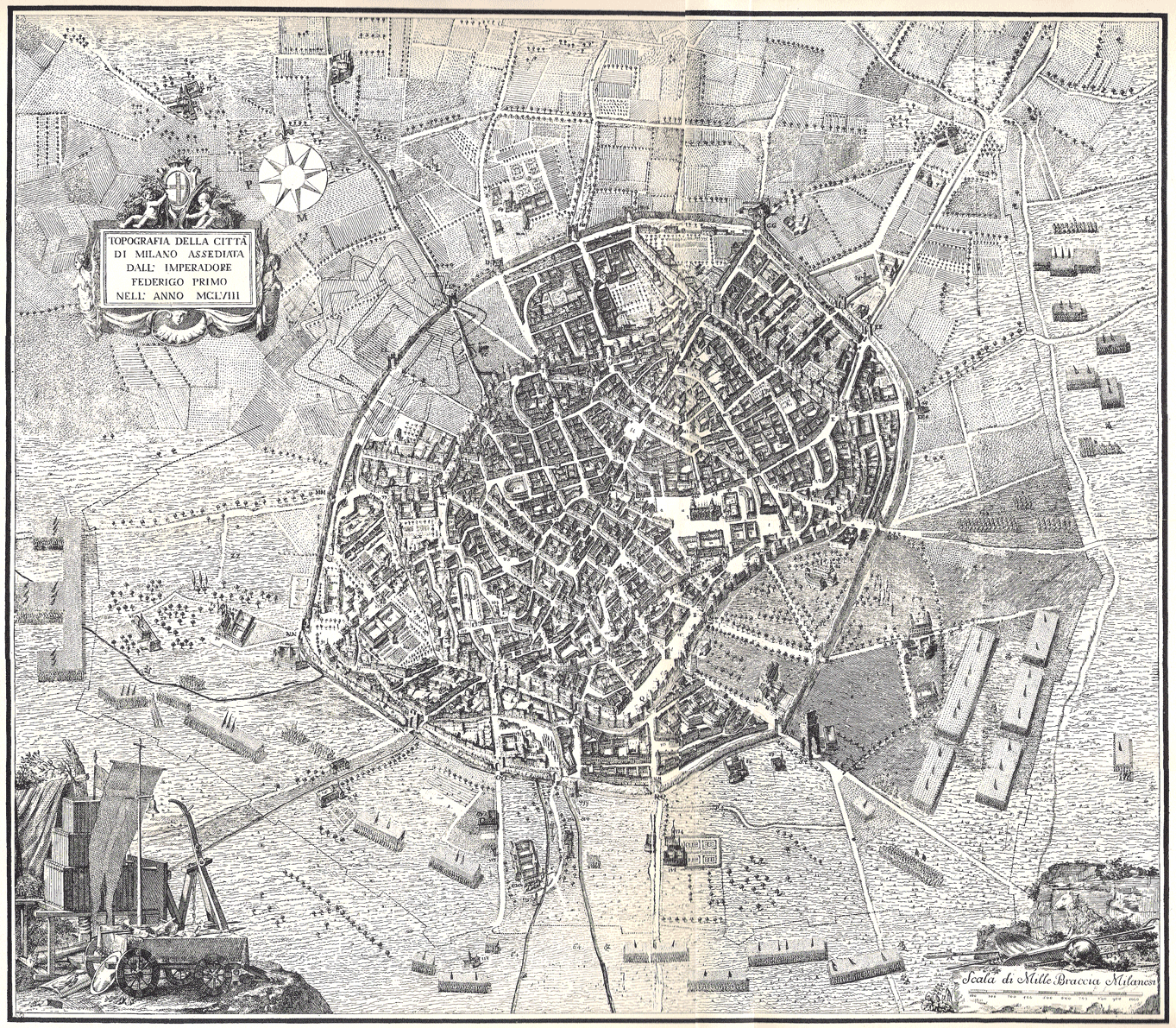
Topographical map of Milan as it supposedly was in 1158, drawn by Aspari in 1778.

== Works ==
His engravings include:

- The Flight into Egypt; after a picture said to be by Correggio.
- The Last Supper; after Leonardo da Vinci.
- M. Peregrina Amoretti; after Boroni.
- Twenty-three Views of Milan.
