= Fabio Mangone =

Italian architect (1587–1629)

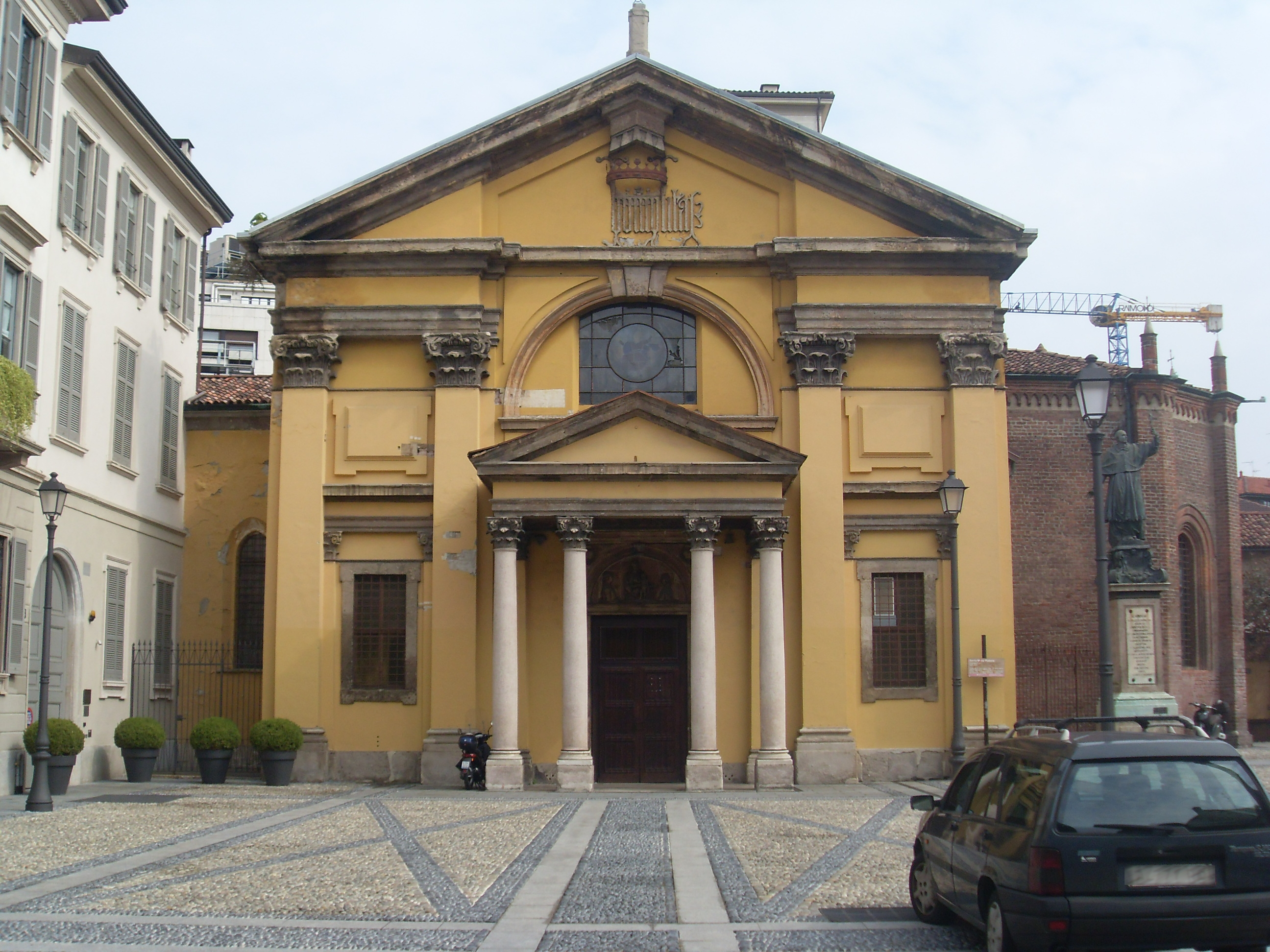
- Façade of the church of Santa Maria Podone in Milan
- Born: 11 November 1587; Milan, Duchy of Milan
- Died: 2 March 1629 (aged 41); Milan, Duchy of Milan
- Education: Alessandro Bisnato
- Known for: Architecture
- Notable work: Biblioteca Ambrosiana; San Sebastiano (Milan); Santa Maria Podone
- Movement: Milanese Baroque

Fabio Mangone (11 November 1587 – 2 March 1629) was an Italian Baroque architect.

== Biography ==
Born in Caravaggio, he was a pupil of Alessandro Bisnato, and succeeded him as architect for the Duomo of Milan. Later, he was a professor of architecture at the Accademia Ambrosiana.

He was assisted by Francesco Maria Richini and others in the rebuilding of the famous Biblioteca Ambrosiana, centering on the large classical enclosed courtyards (1608) of the Collegio Elvetico (now Archivio di Stato or state archives), commissioned by the cardinal Federico Borromeo. The two courtyards are surrounded by double columns. The façade was completed by Richini. The sculpture on the facade is by Dionigi Bussola. He also worked on the completion of the church of San Sebastiano in Milan.

He died in Milan on 2 March 1629, aged 41.
