= Santuario della Madonna della Bocciola =

Coordinates: 45.7949°N 8.4276°E

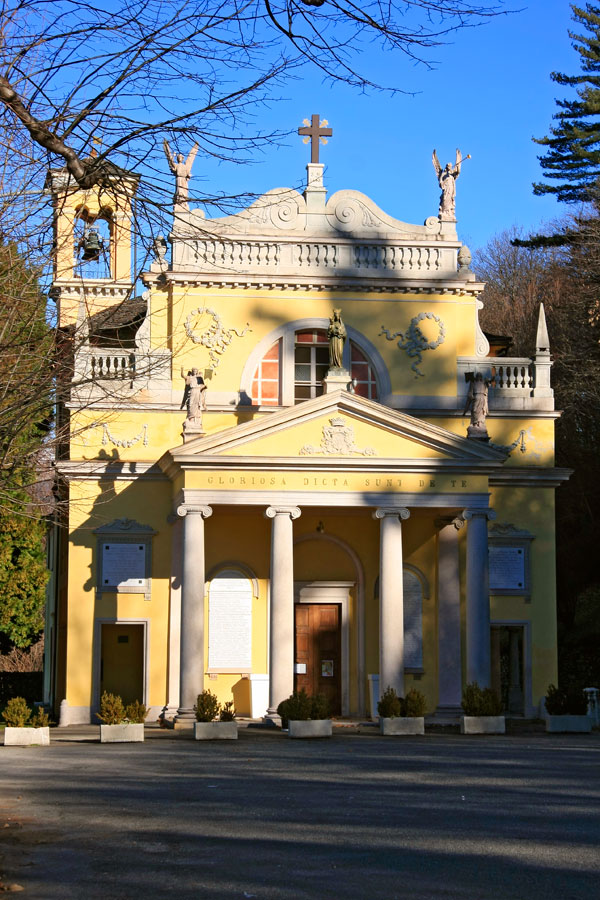
Santuario della Madonna della Bocciola

The Santuario della Madonna della Bocciola is in Ameno municipality, Province of Novara, Italy.

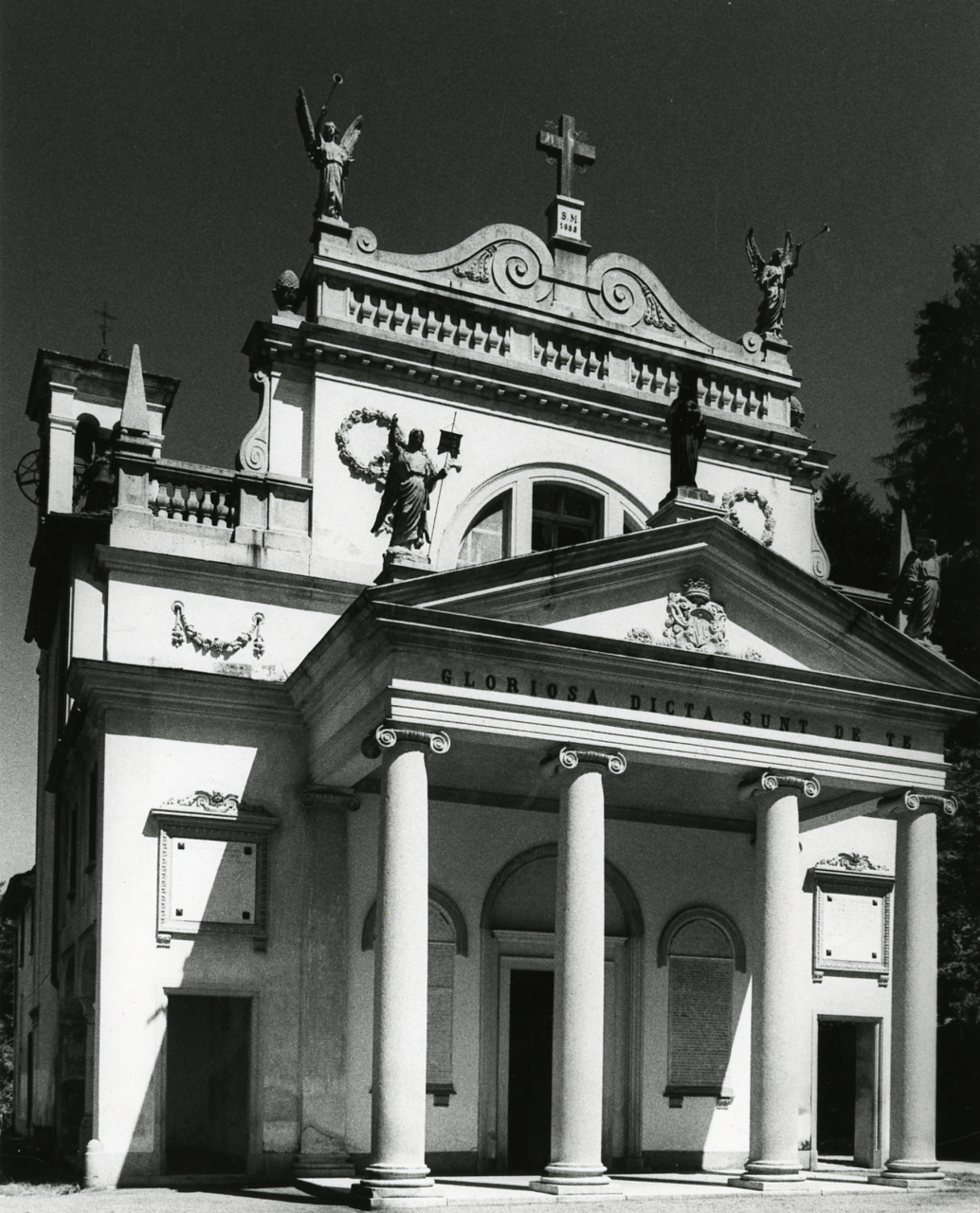
Photo by Paolo Monti

The sanctuary rises up where tradition attributes the setting for a miracle: in 1543 the Virgin Mary appeared to a young shepherdess, Giulia Manfredi, and told her that she would help the village if the inhabitants prayed and did not work on Saturday.

The church was progressively enlarged up to the most recent neoclassical architecture.

== See also ==
- CoEur - In the heart of European paths
