= Ameno, Piedmont =

Ameno
- Comune
- Comune di Ameno
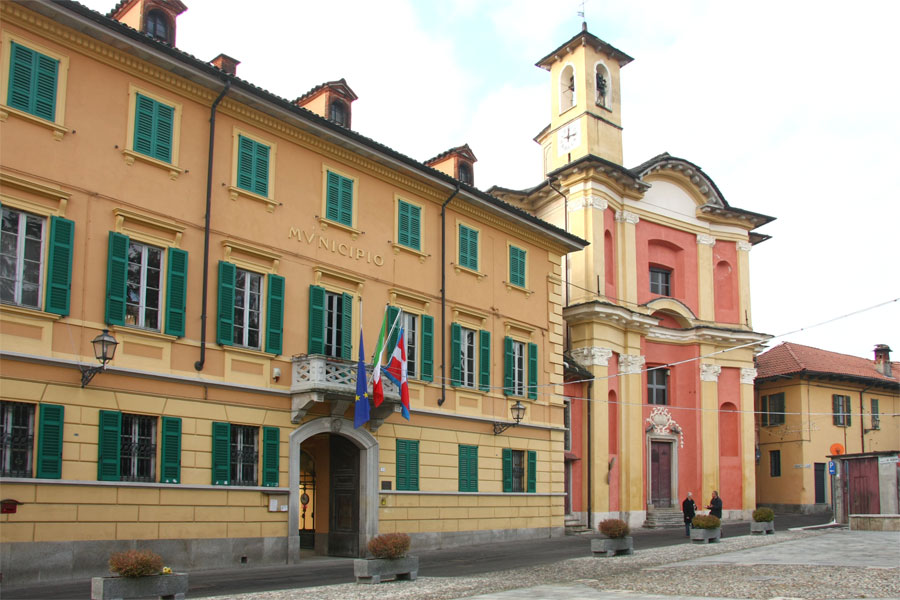
- View of Ameno

- Location of Ameno in Italy Ameno (Piedmont)
- Coordinates: 45°47′N 8°26′E
- Country: Italy
- Region: Piedmont
- Province: Province of Novara (NO)

Area
  - Total: 10.0 km^{2} (3.9 sq mi)
- Elevation: 530 m (1,740 ft)

Population (2011)
  - Total: 874
  - Density: 87.4/km^{2} (226/sq mi)
- Time zone: UTC+1 (CET)
  - Summer (DST): UTC+2 (CEST)
- Postal code: 28010
- Dialing code: 0322

Ameno (Piedmontese and Lombard: Amén) is a comune (municipality) in the Province of Novara in the Italian region of Piedmont, located about 100 kilometres (62 mi) northeast of Turin and about 40 kilometres (25 mi) northwest of Novara. As of 31 December 2004, it has a population of 906 and an area of 10.0 square kilometres (3.9 mi^{2}).

The word Ameno means a healthy, tranquil place in Italian. The village is on the top of a hill surrounded by mountains, a lake, and brushland. Ameno contains numerous ancient homes and castles belonging to noble families from Turin and Milan who vacationed in Ameno during the summer. In addition, the municipality has the Santuario della Madonna della Bocciola. Every June, the village hosts a Blues festival in Ameno.

== History ==
Ameno was an important area in prehistoric times because of its fertile and healthy plateau that had land suitable for crops and grazing. The lake was an easy link with Ossola and Agogna valley was an active terrestrial itinerary from the most ancient prehistory, probably more suitable for the transhumance of the herds of animals from the Novara plain to the mountains rather than for the exchange of goods, which preferred instead the Ticino waterway. The paths that could easily lead from Cusio to Verbano, which in prehistoric times was the most important commercial route between the Adriatic and the Alps.

Between 1915 and 1938, archaeological research conducted in the town of Lortallo revealed one of the most important necropolises of the early Iron Age (known as Ameno F). The whole of the necropolises has tombs dating back from the 9th to the 5th century BC. These finds are related to Golasecca culture, a culture common to various Celtic tribal groups who lived in the early Iron Age in western Lombardy, Novara and Canton of Ticino. The territory of Ameno has also returned other interesting artefacts from the ancient population of Cusio, with the age of artefacts ranging from the Middle Bronze Age (XVI - XIV century BC) to the Imperial Roman period. In Roman times, the road was strengthened with the construction of a road from Novara to Ossola, as evidenced by the numerous Roman artefacts that were found along the main route.

=== Bronze Age finds ===
In 1992, while a fence was being installed around a cemetery in Ameno, Walter Baronchellia found ceramic material from the Bronze Age. The materials are now kept by the Municipality of Ameno. A subsequent excavation carried out in 1994 highlighted ceramic objects that were for domestic use, coming from a nearby settlement dating back to the Middle Bronze Age.

=== The sepulchers of Lortallo ===
At the foot of the ridge on which the town of Lortallo stands (467 metres above sea level), there is a small valley that separates it from the Garulo farmhouse and from Monte Mesma (576 m above sea level). It is accessible from the north and goes up from the Rio Membra, a small tributary of the Agogna. To the south, the valley narrows and runs out at the foot of the Mesma. In this place in 1915, when the modern road to Bolzano Novarese was built, the first tomb of the necropolis was discovered. Since then and for more than thirty years Pietro Barocelli, one of the fathers of Italian palaeontology, and the engineer Giulio Decio, honorary Inspector of the Superintendency, have conducted systematic research campaigns that led to the discovery of numerous burials attributable above all to the early Iron Age.

The archaeological areas of Lortallo, were indicated by burial ground, followed by letters of the alphabet:

- Ameno A burial ground, in Lortallino (tombs 1-2 and 139–143)
- Ameno B burial ground, in Lortallo (tombs nos. 3-46)
- Ameno C burial ground, in the locality of Lortallo, villa Broglio (finds from the Roman era)
- Sepulcreto Ameno D, in the locality of Lortallo, Decio factory (various fragments and objects from the Roman age)
- Ameno E burial ground, in Mesma (tombs nos. 47 and 48–63)
- Ameno F burial ground in Mesma (tombs nos. 64-126 and 127–138)

The tombs were used by the Culture of Golasecca to bury their dead. The dead were indirectly incinerated, with the deposition of the bones of the deceased, personal objects (bronze and iron fibulae, bronze pendants and bracelets) and the ashes of the funeral put within a ceramic urn. In the most ancient phases, this was laid, sometimes covered by a bowl used as a lid, in a simple hole in the ground or in a small box made with thin stone slabs. In the more recent phases, the funerary equipment is enriched with the deposition of accessory vases inside stone cysts made with large slabs. There are also wells lined with pebbles to form a small vault. Stone structures built above and around the tombs have also been identified, serving as markers for the tombs themselves. As remains of offerings, some wells dug near the tombs and the numerous ceramic fragments found in the surrounding terrain must be interpreted. The acidity of the soil, which does not allow for the conservation of organic remains, destroyed the traces of offers of vegetable and animal food to the deceased. Inside the urns, charred hazelnuts were sometimes preserved, which had been laid on the funeral pyre together with the deceased. In many cases, the presence of ceramic glasses with the function of beverage containers offered to the deceased was observed inside the urns. Studies conducted on contemporary necropolises have made it possible to establish whether it is beer or wine.

==== Ameno A ====
On 22 July 1915, during the excavation of the road from Bolzano Novarese to Ameno, two burials were uncovered. The research conducted by the Superintendency to verify whether it was isolated tombs or a necropolis was initially unsuccessful, but it was understood that other burials must have been present in the area. In the summer of 1936, following the accidental discovery of a new tomb (A 140) engineer Giulio Decio, conducted new excavations, identifying three other burials (A 141–143). The materials identified can be dated from Golasecca IC to II A (690-550 BC).

==== Ameno B ====
In 1916, two burials were accidentally discovered in Lortallino. The systematic excavations conducted under the direction of Barocelli in 1917 and 1920 allowed the discovery of 42 other well-shaped burials defended by lithic slabs, surrounded and covered by structures, paved and dry stone walls. In Ameno B, burials with over-roofs represent a high percentage of the depositions and cannot be connected to kits of particular importance, but have an interesting analogy with those of the necropolises of Minusio, Solduno and Mesocco in the Canton of Ticino, where the relationship between their shape and the gender of the deceased, with the use of circular paving for male and rectangular paving for female ones. The Ameno B necropolis was used by Golasecca IC at II AB (690-525 BC).

==== Ameno C ====
In 1899 in Lortallo, while building a factory, various objects from the Roman age were unearthed in mixed soil of coals. In September 1919, further work carried out there found light clay fragments from Roman ruins.

==== Ameno D ====
In 1923 in Villa Broglio park, Roman clay fragments were accidentally found alongside a cremation tomb containing a corroded medium bronze imperial coin, from the Augustan Age. In 1926, the remains of a wall built by the Romans were discovered nearby.

==== Ameno E ====
The first tomb (E 47) was identified on 10 June 1915 on the western slopes of Mount Mesma. It was found during the excavation for the extension of the country road destined to become the road from Bolzano Novarese to Ameno. Barocelli, who went to the place for investigations, noticed the traces of tampering with other tombs, of which "a very large quantity of clay fragments, mixed with burnt bones and very few traces of bronze objects" was found. New essays conducted by Pietro Barocelli and Decio in 1922-1923 north of the road in Mesma allowed the identification of other burials (E 48–63), with abundant ceramic equipment and with some stone superstructures. The area seemed disturbed by Roman interventions (tiles and bricks interspersed with heaps of stones were found), while the necropolis seemed to run out on the edge of an ancient peat bog. The tombs are framed mainly in the Golasecca IC phase (690 - 600 BC)

==== Ameno F ====
The first excavations in the area of the burial ground F, a short distance from Ameno E, were carried out at the beginning of 1928. In that year, in need of building stones, the Decio had excavations carried out in a field at the foot of Mesma, where the remains of a stone wall emerged, finding some tombs from the early Iron and Roman age. The excavations continued on several occasions until 1936 bringing to light numerous burials (F 64–138). The necropolis "F" of Ameno, the oldest among those identified in Ameno, is one of the most important for the study of the beginnings of the Iron Age in the context of the Culture of Golasecca. Characteristics of this necropolis are the biconical or biconical ovoid cinerary urns with decoration made of a false string and pairs of small handles on the maximum expansion and the ovoid urns with decoration in metopal squares with geometric or figured motifs. The latter, rare in the Golasecchian culture which prefers geometric decoration, are stylized quadrupedal figures, generally interpreted as equine. The "horses" of Ameno, chronologically limited to the ninth century BC, are perhaps to be related to the coeval spread of horse riding in northern Italy and the consequent decline of the oldest tradition of chariot fighting. It does not seem accidental that this figurative motif is widespread mainly in the area between Ameno and Castelletto Ticino, a territory which still today offers ideal characteristics for the breeding of horses. The necropolis F was used for several centuries. Although the most frequented phase is Golasecca I A1 (c. 935 - 800 BC), there are in fact more recent isolated tombs up to G. II B (525-480 BC) and the Roman era.

==== Ameno G ====
A new necropolis was discovered by Walter Baronchelli in 1976. During excavation works around hundred meters south of the burial ground F, numerous fragments of clay belonging to Iron Age tombs were unearthed. Two burials with relatively well-preserved ceramic could be recovered. In the tombs, they found urns, vases and bowls that dated back to Golasecca culture. No further excavations were carried out in the area. The finds were delivered to the municipality and then deposited in the Museum of Antiquities of Turin.

=== Mount Mesma ===
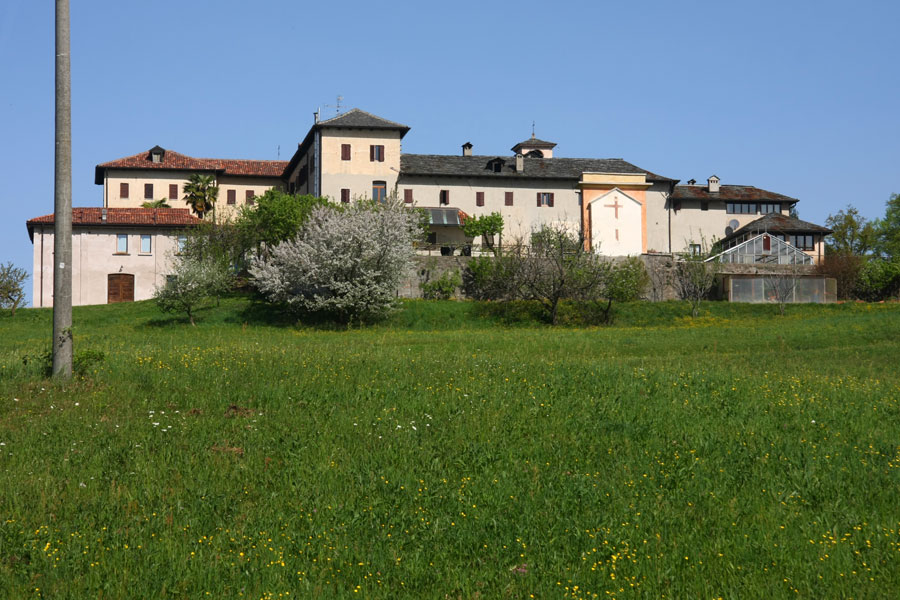
Photo of the Franciscan convent on Monte Mesma

The Franciscan convent on Monte Mesma

Parallel to the research in the necropolis areas, Giulio Decio also conducted excavation tests on the slopes of Mount Mesma, under the Franciscan monastery where brick fragments from the Roman era had been found. The research led to the identification, in various points, of fragments of protohistoric domestic pottery in a secondary position, bronze fibulae and remains of clay fictile from the Roman period. These discoveries led the Decio to hypothesize the presence of a built-up area on the well-stocked summit of Mount Mesma, from which the surrounding area is easily dominated. An indirect confirmation of the strategic value of the place, centuries later, is given by the construction in the Middle Ages of a castle, probably in 1200, by the Municipality of Novara. The present Franciscan monastery was later built on the ruins of this. The necropolises discovered in Lortallo were located along the main access road to the town, according to a use widely attested in the early Iron Age. The village on Mesma was the most important, but probably not the only inhabited centre. According to the use of the golasecchiano world, smaller nuclei, linked to the main by clanic constraints, had to rise on the surrounding hills. Coeval ceramic remains were in fact recovered in Lortallo and on the Buccione hill.

=== The Roman age ===
The Roman period is less documented in Ameno than the Iron Age is. At Lortallo and on the Mesma, there are many tourists, but since what they've found relating to the period are isolated and accidentally found, it is not currently possible to reconstruct the general picture of the settlement. The finds made on the rest of the territory have unfortunately gone missing, like the Roman vase found at about one meter deep in 1931, inside the park of the Villa Calabi, in Vacciago. In 1693, as the historian Lazzaro Agostino Cotta writes, Giovanni Battista Bertochino had found some imperial Roman coins of the III and IV centuries in a fund of his in the "castle" locality.

== Monuments and Places of Interest ==
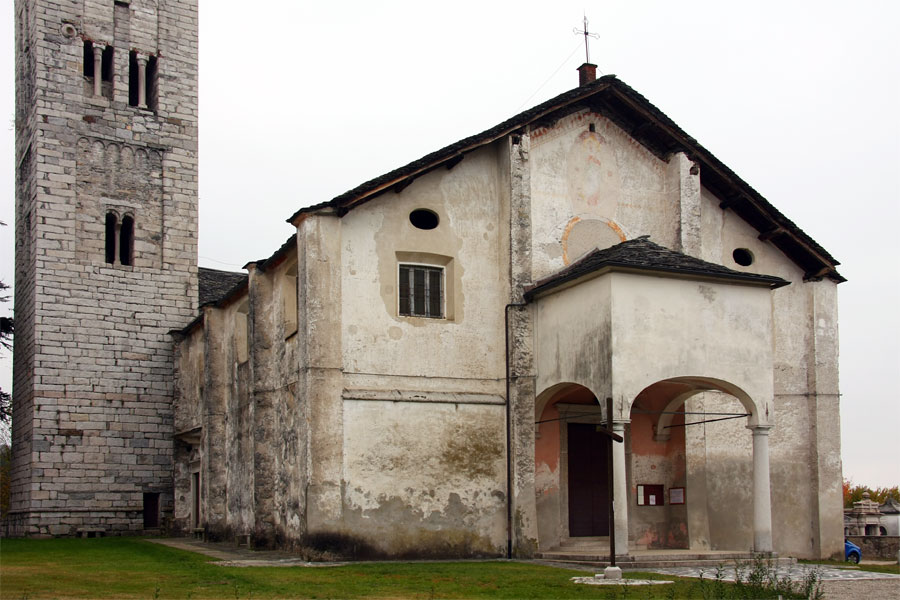
Parish Church of Santa Maria Assunta in Ameno

The Parish Church of the Assumption is an important landmark for the area thanks to its spire bell tower and its structure which has three naves. It was built in the first half of the fourteenth century on the site of an ancient church that is claimed to be founded by San Giulio. The bell tower was built in 1505 with large granite stones, in late Romanesque and Renaissance style. In the seventeenth and eighteenth centuries, the town experienced a very remarkable artistic/religious flowering with the construction and restoration of sixteen churches in baroque forms, each with valuable frescoes and furnishings. Notable examples are found in the Cusian architecture of the time: the facade of the Church of San Giovanni Battista, that of San Rocco in the capital and San Giovanni Battista in Cassano.

In the town of Vacciago, it is worth noting the valuable architecture of the Casa Calderara, with its triple Renaissance loggia. It is the seat of the "Calderara Foundation" a gallery of contemporary art, a foundation created by the painter Antonio Calderara (Abbiategrasso 1903 - Vacciago di Ameno 1978) who at his death wanted to make his home and his collection of paintings available to the public. and that of other avant-garde artists with whom he had a friendship and artistic collaboration.

Other notable Renaissance examples are the 16th century Church of Sant'Antonio, and the spectacular Oratory of Sant'Anna, located in the locality of Vacciaghetto, as well as the Sanctuary of the Madonna della Bocciola . The sanctuary recalls the apparition of the Virgin, on a hawthorn bush to a silent shepherdess, Giulia Manfredi, who in 1564 prayed devoutly at the rustic chapel. The girl began to speak, but only for a few days because according to the testimonies she soon died in the church at the foot of the pulpit. A religious festival is celebrated annually on the first Sunday of September and always attracts a large number of people. We find in the hamlet of Lortallo, a small baroque oratory dedicated to San Grato which houses the altarpiece of Giovan Battista Discepoli with the Madonna and Child and Saints Grato and San Bernardo di Mentone. Near the seventeenth-century Oratory of San Grato, there is a tower dating back to the thirteenth century. A second tower is located inside a private house.

On Monte Mesma there is the Franciscan Convent, built in 1619 on a castle's ruins. The castle was built in 1200 by the municipality of Novara, but was destroyed in 1358 by men from Lortallo and Ameno, after becoming angry with the way the municipality treated them. The convent consists of a church flanked by two fine baroque cloisters with grey stone roofs. Inside there is a large ancient marble stove which still serves to heat the convent during the winter. The convent is still used for meditation and prayers of the friars who live there. On New Year's Eve, a peace vigil has been taking place for years that attracts young people from all over the province.

== Culture ==
In the town of Vacciago, there is a collection of contemporary art that the artist, Antonio Calderara left as a showcase of the avant-garde artistic trends from around 1920 to 1978, the year when he died. There you can see around 327 works by 133 different world-renowned authors.

In the museum set up in the town hall, valuable 17th-century paintings are exhibited and contemporary art exhibitions are held there.

In the nearby church, there is a large canvas depicting the Council of Trent.

In June, an important blues festival called Amenoblues takes place in Ameno.

== Economy ==
In the past, the people of the region mainly lived on agriculture and livestock, which is now in decline. Currently, the area has artisan companies and an articulated commercial network. Due to a lack of jobs, many Amenese have to find work in neighbouring municipalities. Thanks to the region's valuable artistic heritage, the municipality has recently seen a boost in tourism.

== Geography and territory ==
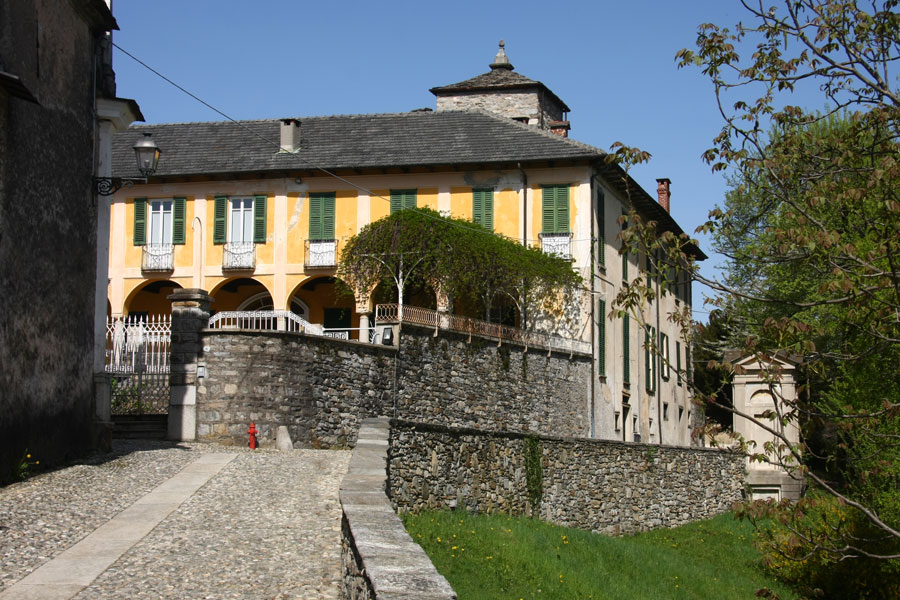
Photo of house in Lortallo

The municipal area is located on a large plateau overlooking the eastern shore of Lake Orta. The village is surrounded by coppiced woods and is a popular destination for summer holidays with numerous houses located along the road running between the mountain and the lake. The territory has an elevation ranging from 380 to 788 meters. This measurement includes the hills that divide Lake Orta from the Agogna Valley and the capital in the centre and further down into the region of Vacciago, with its small villages of Vacciaghetto and Lortallo. Ameno became sister cities in 2007 with the French commune of Commelle-Vernay. The region is part of the mountain community with various other cities such as: Due Laghi, Cusio Mottarone, and Valstrona. On 26 September 2012, the region joined the: "Borgo sostenibile del Piemonte" - a program for more responsible tourism, which local communities around the area had created to encourage implementing good environmental practices.

In June 2014 the Quadrifoglio di Ameno (Four-leaf clover) was inaugurated, it is an itinerary consisting of four trekking paths in the territory, created by the municipal administration of Ameno with the precious collaboration of Riccardo Carnovalini (photographer and alpinist). The routes extend for a total of 33,6 km (approximately 21 miles), with a total difference in height of 1,215 m, and a maximum altitude of 791 m. The average travel time of the 4 rings on foot is 12 hours and the paths are passable for 90% of their extent by mountain bike and on horseback.

== Administration ==
Period		Mayor	Party	Charge	Note
June 1, 1985	May 28, 1990	Carlo Didò	-	Mayor	
May 28, 1990	April 24, 1995	Carlo Didò	Christian Democracy	Mayor	
April 24, 1995	June 14, 1999	Carlo Didò	center	Mayor	
June 14, 1999	June 14, 2004	Carlo Didò	center	Mayor	
June 14, 2004	January 26, 2008	Micaela Gerardi	civic list	Mayor	
January 26, 2008	April 15, 2008	Marco Baldino		Comm. Pref.	
April 15, 2008	May 27, 2013	Micaela Gerardi	civic list	Mayor	
May 27, 2013	June 10, 2018	Roberto Neri	civic list : for Ameno	Mayor	
June 10, 2018	in charge	Noemi Brambilla	civic list : Ameno Insieme	Mayor	

== Demographic evolution ==
Historical population

Year	Pop.	±%
1861	1,826	—
1871	1,891	+3.6%
1881	2,001	+5.8%
1901	2,263	+13.1%
1911	1,836	−18.9%
1921	1,638	−10.8%

Year	Pop.	±%
1931	1,396	−14.8%
1936	1,263	−9.5%
1951	1,304	+3.2%
1961	1,147	−12.0%
1971	989	−13.8%
1981	924	−6.6%

Year	Pop.	±%
1991	891	−3.6%
2001	895	+0.4%
2011	874	−2.3%
2021	850	−2.7%

Dati tratti da:
- "Popolazione residente dei comuni. Censimenti dal 1861 al 1991" (PDF). ISTAT.
- "Popolazione residente per territorio – serie storica".
Nota bene: il dato del 2021 si riferisce al dato del censimento permanente al 31 dicembre di quell'anno.
