= San Sebastiano, Milan =

Church in Milan, Italy

Coordinates: 45°27′44″N 9°11′10″E

Temple-Church of San Sebastiano
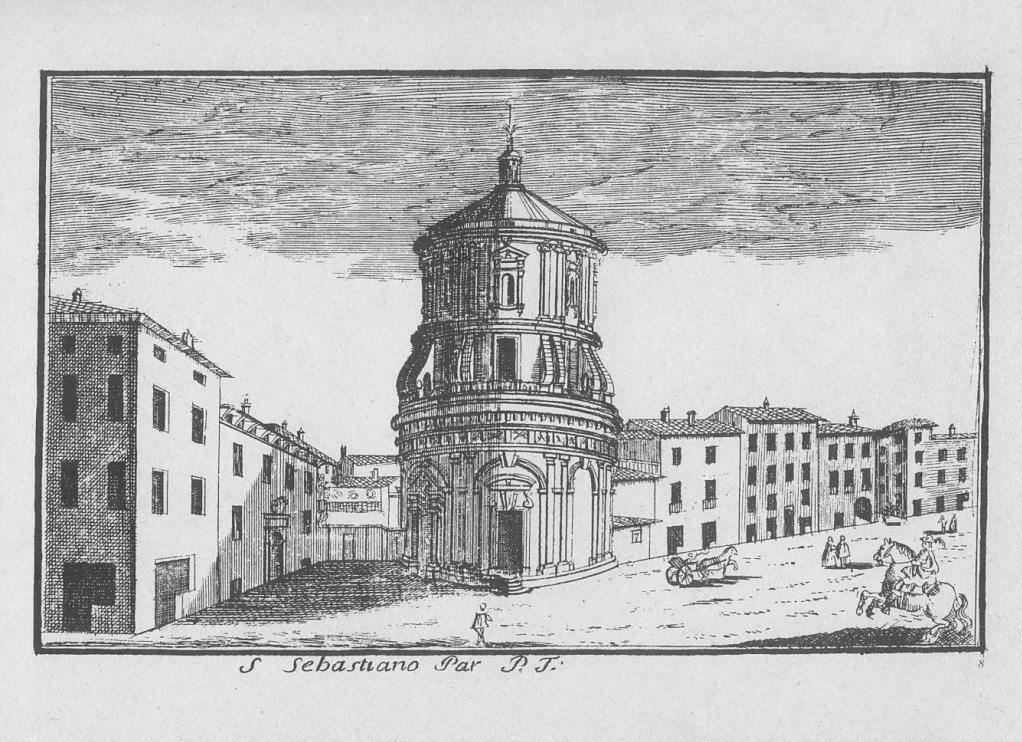
- Engraving (1745) by Marc'Antonio Dal Re

Religion
- Affiliation: Roman Catholic
- Province: Milan

Location
- Location: Milan, Italy
- Interactive map of Temple-Church of San Sebastiano

Architecture
- Type: Church
- Style: Mannerism
- Groundbreaking: 1576
- Completed: 17th century

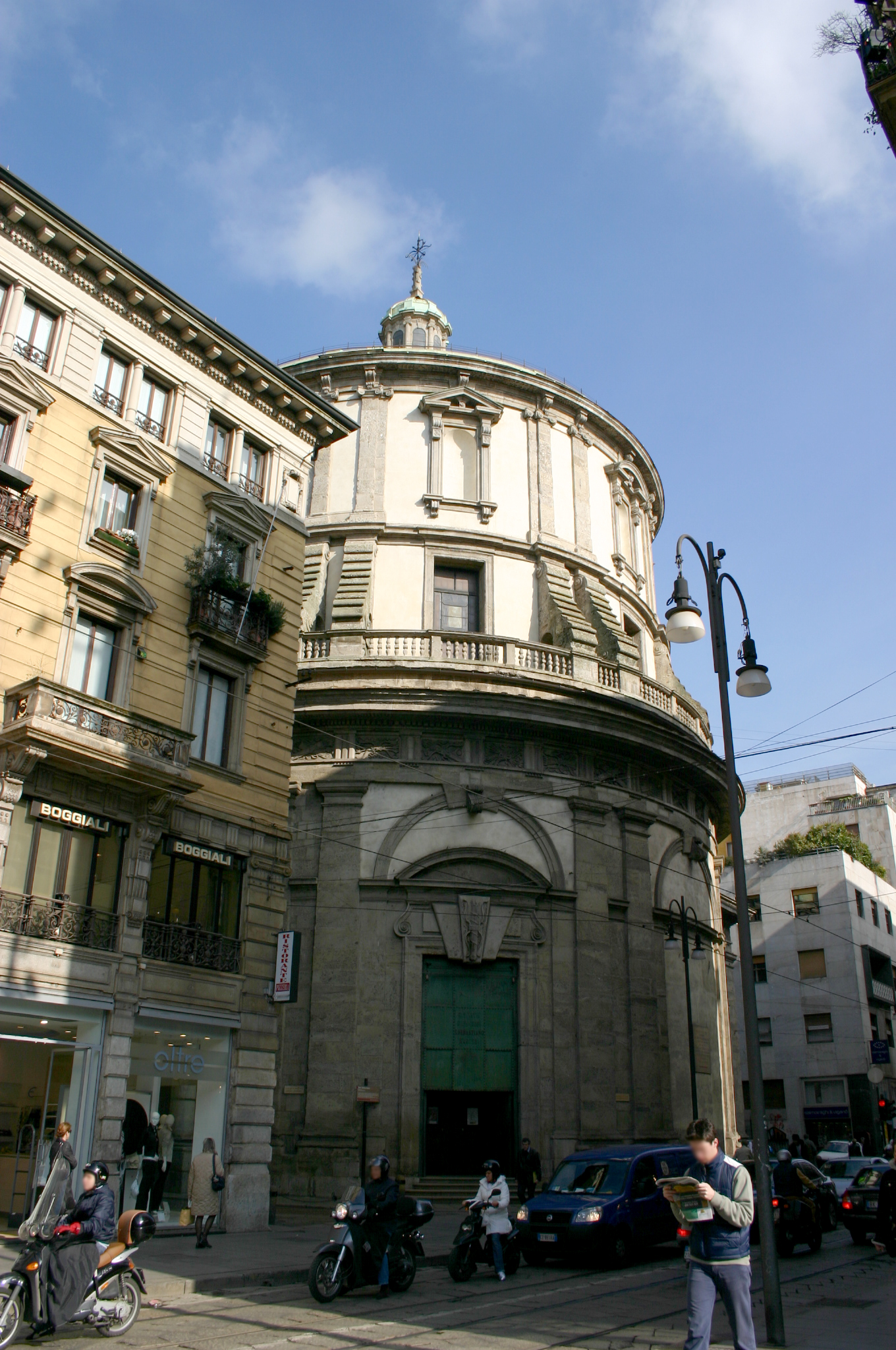
San Sebastiano.

The Temple of San Sebastiano is a late-Renaissance- or Mannerist-style church in central Milan.

The cylindrical church is shaped like a can capped with a dome. The octagonal church was commissioned in 1576, after the end of a season of plague, dedicated to St Sebastian. The non-linear layout is atypical for post-Tridentine churches. Perhaps the site, which had housed an earlier medieval church or sanctuary dedicated to San Quilino, dictated the shape. Some evidence suggests that the architect Pellegrino Tibaldi designed the building with other round churches or the Pantheon as models. He did not spare the mannerist details such as false windows on the top story, and highly decorated spandrels. The church construction was advanced in 1586, when Tibaldi left for Spain, and supervision of the project fell to Pietro Antonio Barca, who modified the height and size of the dome. In 1616–1617, under Fabio Mangone further reconstruction occurred with addition of a chancel to the main chapel. The cupola was decorated in 1832 by Agostino Comerio. The building has been used both as a church and civic chapel. Some rooms in the vestry are used to screen films.

== See also ==
- 17th-century Western domes

== Sources ==
- Lombardy Beniculturali entry
