= Dionigi Bussola =

Italian artist (1615-1687)

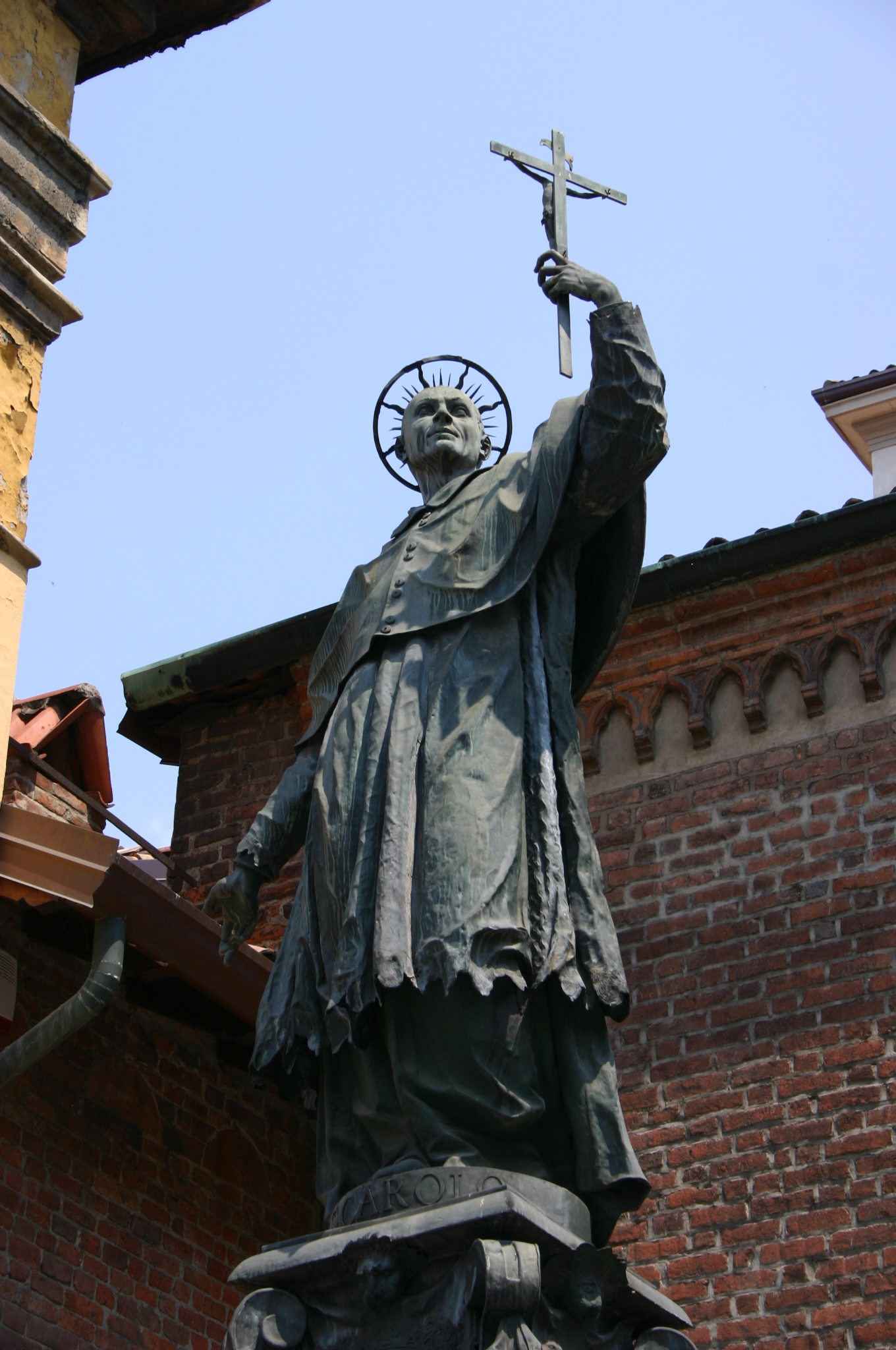
Dionigi Bussola, Monument to Charles Borromeo next to S. Maria Podone in Milan.

Dionigi or Dionisio Bussola (1615 – 1687) was an Italian sculptor active mainly in Milan and its environs during the Baroque era.

Bussola was probably born in Lombardy around 1615. He trained in Rome with Ercole Ferrata, then returned to Milan in 1645 to work on statuary for the cathedral there. He also contributed sculptural reliefs of the early life of Christ to the Certosa of Pavia.

In addition to his work in the Cathedral and Certosa, Bussola is known for the statuary which he produced for the Sacri Monti of Piedmont and Lombardy. The embellishment of these sacri monti (literally “sacred mounts”) became especially popular during the Counter Reformation: they are typically hills dotted with shrines or chapels which contain polychrome tableaux (or sculptural groups) which depict biblical or other pious subjects. For nearly two decades (1666–1684), he worked in the sacri monti of Orta San Giulio, Varallo Sesia, Varese, and Domodossola. For the Sacro Monte of San Francesco in Orta alone he created hundreds of terracotta figures.

Bussola had a son Cesare, born in 1653, who also became a sculptor.

Dionigi Bussola died in Milan in 1687.

== Gallery ==
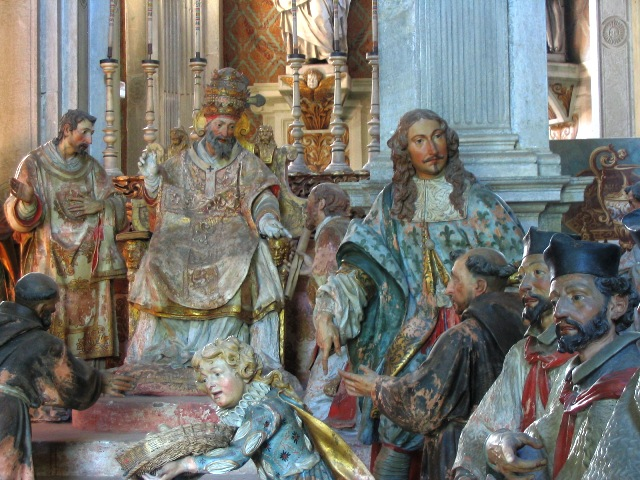
Terracotta polychrome statuary group at Sacro Monte di Orta

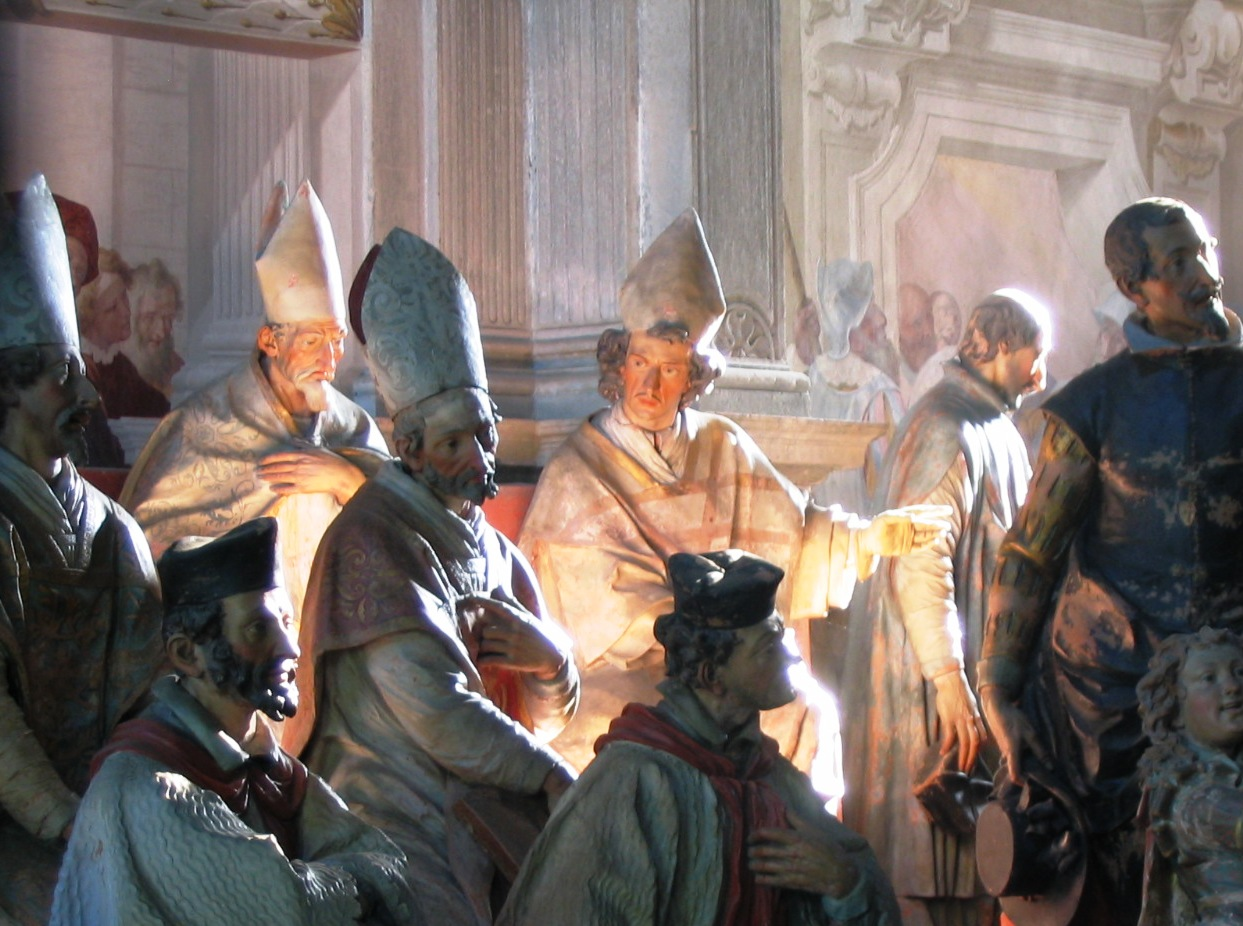
Group of cardinals at Sacro Monte di Orta
