= Calciopoli =

2006 Italian association football scandal

Calciopoli (Italian: [kalˈtʃɔːpoli]) was a sports scandal that emerged in Italy's professional association football league in 2006. It involved some of the most famous and successful football teams in Italy: Juventus, AC Milan, SS Lazio, ACF Fiorentina, Arezzo and AS Reggina. Media reporting on the scandal labeled it Calciopoli (literally "Footballville", adapting the term Tangentopoli (Bribesville) that had been used to describe the political corruption scandals in Italy in the early 1990s.

The scandal was first discovered by Italian authorities during an investigation of allegations of doping by Juventus players. Transcripts of wiretapped conversations between Juventus's General Manager Luciano Moggi and various officials revealed an elaborate scheme to affect the outcome of matches by influencing referees.

It involved having referees who were favourable to Juventus being assigned to their games, directly (or indirectly) pressuring referees to make decisions beneficial to Juventus, or giving penalty cards in preceding matches, which would render certain players ineligible to play against Juventus.

== Background ==
The scandal first came to light as a consequence of investigations of prosecutors on the Italian football agency GEA World founded by Luciano Moggi's son Alessandro. The leak of news that triggered Calciopoli in May 2006 did not start from the major sports or investigative press but rather came from Il Romanista, a newspaper entirely dedicated to Roma supporters, and whose founder Riccardo Luna continued to boast of being "the first to reveal the intrigues of Calciopoli". The first major sport newspaper to anticipate and report the scandal was Milan-based La Gazzetta dello Sport, which also anticipated the subsequent court rulings. Transcripts of recorded telephone conversations soon thereafter published in major Italian newspapers suggested that Juventus general director Luciano Moggi and Juventus CEO Antonio Giraudo had conversations with several Italian football officials to influence referee designations during the 2004–05 Serie A season. Notable referees, such as Pierluigi Collina and Roberto Rosetti, were among the few referees to emerge unscathed from the scandal.

== Investigation and sporting sentences ==
On 8 May 2006, Franco Carraro resigned from the presidency of the FIGC, the body responsible for selecting Italy's FIFA World Cup national team; he remained a member of the UEFA's executive committee and as a FIFA official. Juventus' entire board of directors resigned on 11 May, while Moggi resigned shortly after Juventus won the 2005–06 Serie A championship on 14 May, saying: "They killed my soul." Giraudo stated: "We take our leave, but you will see that bandits will come after us." On the Borsa Italiana, Italy's stock market, Juventus shares had lost about half their 9 May value by 19 May. Massimo De Santis was due to be Italy's refereeing representative at the 2006 World Cup; he was barred by the FIGC after coming under investigation. Roberto Rosetti remained untainted by the scandal, and was chosen as one of the twenty-one 2006 FIFA World Cup officials.

The scandal drew attention to many potential conflicts of interest within Italian football. (Note: Among them were: Prime Minister of Italy: Silvio Berlusconi, Milan owner and president, and owner of several TV stations, magazines, and newspapers, as well as the leader of Forza Italia political party. Through his TV-station ownership, Berlusconi controlled soccer TV rights for all teams competing in Serie A and Serie B.; FIGC president: Franco Carraro, former Milan president and co-owner of Lazio and Roma through his control of Capitalia; FIGC vice-president: Massimo Moratti, Inter Milan owner; Lega Calcio president: Adriano Galliani, Milan vice-president; Italian football sponsor: Marco Tronchetti Provera, major Inter Milan shareholder, and owner of Telecom Italia and its sister company Gruppo TIM, which sponsored all major Italian football competitions (Serie A, Coppa Italia, and Supercoppa Italiana), as well as owner of Pirelli (Inter Milan primary sponsor) and TV channel La7; FIGC investigation chief: Francesco Saverio Borrelli, a political associate of Berlusconi, who had meetings behind closed doors with Galliani throughout the trial; FIGC commissioner: Guido Rossi, minority Inter Milan shareholder, former Inter Milan director, and member of Telecom's board of directors; FIGC investigation commissioner regarding Inter Milan accounting fraud resulting in capital gains (plusvalenze): Marco Stefanini, acting lawyer for La Spezia soccer team, which was owned by Moratti, who was also still the club's minority shareholder with 40% shares; AIA commissioner: Luigi Agnolin, former executive of Roma; La Gazzetta dello Sport president: Carlo Buora, who was also acting as Inter Milan vice-president; La Gazzetta dello Sport chief-editor: Carlo Verdelli, minority Inter Milan shareholder; Il Corriere dello Sport chief-editor: Bruno Bertolozzi, Inter Milan employee as communications and organizational director) Inter Milan provided sponsorship to the Serie A through Gruppo TIM, as Inter Milan vice-president Marco Tronchetti Provera was TIM director. Silvio Berlusconi, Milan's president and owner, was Prime Minister of Italy and owner of TV company Mediaset through Fininvest, while Adriano Galliani, as the vice president and CEO of Milan, also served as the president of Serie A. Juventus has been historically owned by the Agnelli family since the 1930s, one of the most powerful and rich family in Italy, which controls, alongside the Elkann family, one of the greatest holding company in the world Exor, the largest automobile manufacturer in Italy FIAT, their members have held political offices, Umberto Agnelli has been briefly the president of Italian Football Federation in the '60s and also FIAT has been the sponsor of the FIGC and also of the Association of Italian Referee (AIA) with the conflict of interest associated. (Note: GEDI Gruppo Editoriale, the Agnelli family owns several very important newspapers, such as La Stampa and la Repubblica, none of which are sports focused like Milan-leaning La Gazzetta dello Sport or Rome-leaning Corriere dello Sport. Turin-based Tuttosport, which is not owned by the Agnelli family, is the only Juventus-leaning major sport newspaper; in 2011, Juventus attacked Tuttosport from its harsh criticism of the club during the 2010–11 Serie A season. In addition, at the time of the events, while the Agnelli family retained majority ownership, both Gianni Agnelli and Vittorio Caissotti di Chiusano had died in 2003, and Umberto Agnelli also died in 2004, and was succeeded by Franzo Grande Stevens, while John Elkann (rather than Andrea Agnelli), Gianluigi Gabetti, and Luca Cordero di Montezemolo became more involved with the club. At least one of Agnelli-owned newspaper has been described as the Italian New York Times or a newspaper of record, and newspapers, such as la Repubblica and La Stampa, published wiretaps implicating both Moggi and Juventus. La Repubblica took a colpevolisti stance.) In addition to allegations of corruption and sporting fraud by owners, executives, players, referees, and league officials, Aldo Biscardi, the host of Italy's most popular football show, resigned amid allegations that he collaborated with Moggi to boost the club's image on television, compared to the Milanese side. Then-FIGC president Carraro was a former president of Milan and politically close to Berlusconi, while its successor in the four months as Extraordinary Commissioner Guido Rossi was a former member of Inter Milan's board of directors and minority Inter Milan shareholder. Journalist Christian Rocca commented: "I wonder why the Italian media say every possible abomination on the potential conflict of interest of Adriano Galliani, president of Lega [Calcio] and executive of Milan, but don't use the same criterion towards Guido Rossi, extraordinary commissioner of the Italian Football Federation and former executive of Moratti's Inter Milan from 1995 to 1999, and of Gigi Agnolin, appointed commissioner of referees but still former executive of Roma from 1995 to 2000 (instead of Moggi, look what a combination)." Federal prosecutor Carlo Porceddu, a critic of the trial, especially for its decision of revoking Juventus' title by assigning it to Inter Milan, stated in 2017 that Rossi appointed friends, one of whom was on Inter Milan's board of directors.

In all, magistrates in Naples formally investigated 41 people, and looked into 19 Serie A matches from the 2004–05 season and 14 Serie A matches from the 2005–06 season. Prosecutors in Turin examined the Juventus chairman Antonio Giraudo over transfers, suspected falsified accounts, and tax evasion. Prosecutors in Parma investigated Gianluigi Buffon, the national team goalkeeper, as well as Antonio Chimenti, Enzo Maresca, and Mark Iuliano, for suspected gambling on Serie A matches; all were cleared in the same year. After the first penalties were handed out, more clubs were looked at for possible links to the scandal. Lecce, Messina, and Siena were also investigated as prosecutors continued to analyze transcripts of telephone calls.

=== Matches under investigation ===
The standings of the 2005–06 Serie A championship, which was won by Juventus, were remade to retroactively punish implicated clubs the year prior. This controversially resulted in third-classified Inter Milan being awarded the scudetto by then-FIGC commissioner Guido Rossi after a vote, on whether the title should be assigned by the tre saggi ("Three Sages") Gerhard Aigner, Massimo Coccia, and Roberto Pardolesi, as well as Juventus' relegation, and four other clubs (Fiorentina, Lazio, Milan, and Reggina) received penalty points. Only Aigner voted in favour of the assignation, with Rossi's ultimate decisive push for the assignation, even though UEFA only needed the final standings, and the cited precedent of the unassigned 1926–27 Divisione Nazionale title, which was revoked from Torino and not assigned to Bologna as the second-classified club. The 2005–06 championship was never investigated, and only the 2004–05 Serie A championship, also won by Juventus, was revoked.

The nineteen matches of the 2004–05 championship under investigation by the Naples prosecutor were the following:

- Reggina–Juventus 2–1 (6 November 2004)
  Referee: Gianluca Paparesta
- Lecce–Juventus 0–1 (14 November 2004)
  Referee: Massimo De Santis
- Juventus–Lazio 2–1 (5 December 2004)
  Referee: Paolo Dondarini
- Fiorentina–Bologna 1–0 (5 December 2004)
  Referee: Massimo De Santis
- Bologna–Juventus 0–1 (12 December 2004)
  Referee: Tiziano Pieri
- Juventus–Udinese 2–1 (13 February 2005)
  Referee: Pasquale Rodomonti
- ChievoVerona–Lazio 0–1 (20 February 2005)
  Referee: Gianluca Rocchi
- Lazio–Parma 2–0 (27 February 2005)
  Referee: Domenico Messina
- Roma–Juventus 1–2 (5 March 2005)
  Referee: Salvatore Racalbuto
- Inter Milan–Fiorentina 3–2 (20 March 2005)
  Referee: Paolo Bertini
- Fiorentina–Juventus 3–3 (9 April 2005)
  Referee: Pierluigi Collina
- Milan–Brescia 1–1 (10 April 2005)
  Referee: Pasquale Rodomonti
- Bologna–Lazio 1–2 (17 April 2005)
  Referee: Paolo Tagliavento
- Siena–Milan 2–1 (17 April 2005)
  Referee: Pierluigi Collina
- Milan–ChievoVerona 1–0 (20 April 2005)
  Referee: Gianluca Paparesta
- ChievoVerona–Fiorentina 1–2 (8 May 2005)
  Referee: Paolo Dondarini
- Livorno–Siena 3–6 (8 May 2005)
  Referee: Massimo De Santis
- Lazio–Fiorentina 1–1 (22 May 2005)
  Referee: Roberto Rosetti
- Lecce–Parma 3–3 (29 May 2005)
  Referee: Massimo De Santis

Walter Distato and Leo Leonida from the University of London and Dario Maimone and Pietro Navarra from the University of Messina conducted a study on the 2004–05 Serie A championship. According to the study, Juventus averaged less points per game with investigated referees (De Santis, Rodomonti, Bertini, Dondarini, Rocchi, Messina, Gabriele, Racalbuto, and Tagliavento) than those who were not; Juventus averaged 2.63 points per game with the latter, and 1.89 points per game with the former. Fiorentina and Milan, two other clubs involved in the scandal, averaged 1.22 points per game with the latter, and 0.93 points per game with the former, and 2.19 points per game with the latter, and 2.0 points per game with the former, respectively. The only exception was Lazio, another club implicated in the scandal, which averaged 2.0 points per game with the former, and 0.81 points with the latter.

About their study, the authors wrote: "Ours is a purely statistical study. We are not interested, nor are we able to establish, if Moggi and the other executives under investigation could influence the matches, but from our point of view we can highlight three hypotheses more than valid: either there was no referee conditioning in the 2004–05 championship, or it existed but did not produce relevant results, or it's possible to think of a clash between executives for the acquisition of the football system that gave rise to winning and losing clubs in that which we can define as a 'parallel championship.'" Navarra, one of the authors, wrote: "In addition, in the study we also took into account the strength of the opponents faced by the teams involved. Juventus, for example, met stronger teams in matches directed by the referees under investigation. This could explain, at least in part, the considerable difference in the overall point average."

=== Club punishments and Juventus' controversy ===
On 4 July 2006, the FIGC prosecutor Stefano Palazzi called for all four clubs at the centre of the scandal to be thrown out of Serie A. Palazzi called for Juventus "being excluded from the Serie A Championship and assigned to a lower category to Serie B with 6 points deducted", while Fiorentina, Lazio, and Milan were to be also downgraded to last place in the 2005–06 Serie A and relegated to the 2006–07 Serie B. He also asked for point deductions to be imposed for the following season for the clubs (three for Milan and 15 for both Fiorentina and Lazio). The prosecutor also called for Juventus to be stripped of its 2005 title and downgraded to the last place in the 2006 league.

In the case against Reggina on 13 August, the prosecutor called for Reggina to be demoted to Serie B with a 15-point penalty. On 17 August, Reggina was handed down a 15-point penalty but no relegation from Serie A. Furthermore, the club was fined the equivalent of €100,000, while the club president Pasquale Foti was fined €30,000 and banned from all football-related activities for two-and-a-half years.

Italian Football Federation punishments
Team	Relegation			Points deductions (2006–07 season)			Other punishments	
Team	Original punishment	Appeal result	Final punishment	Original punishment	Appeal result	Final punishment	Original punishment	Final punishment
Milan	None			−15 points	−8 points		• Deducted 44 points for the 2005–06 Serie A • Deducted 15 points for the 2006–07 Serie A • Out of the 2006–07 UEFA Champions League	• Deducted 30 points for the 2005–06 Serie A • One home game behind closed doors
Fiorentina	Relegated to Serie B	Administrative relegation cancelled		−12 points (Serie B)	−19 points (Serie A)	−15 points (Serie A)	Out of the 2006–07 UEFA Champions League	• Out of the 2006–07 UEFA Champions League • Two home games behind closed doors
Juventus	Relegated to Serie B			−30 points (Serie B)	−17 points (Serie B)	−9 points (Serie B)	€75,000 fine	• Stripped of the 2004–05 Serie A title (left not assigned) • Downgraded to last place in the 2005–06 Serie A (title given to Inter Milan) and relegated to the 2006–07 Serie B
Lazio	Relegated to Serie B	Administrative relegation cancelled		−7 points (Serie B)	−11 points (Serie A)	−3 points (Serie A)	Out of the 2006–07 UEFA Cup	• Out of the 2006–07 UEFA Cup • Two home games behind closed doors
Reggina	None			−15 points	No appeal result	−11 points	No original punishment	• €100,000 fine • Club president Pasquale Foti fined €30,000 and banned from football for 2½ years

In the ruling, the Federal Commission of Appeal (CAF), a FIGC judicial court, stated that Juventus was not responsible for Fiorentina avoiding relegation, and that Moggi and Giraudo operated independently of Juventus and its owners. In addition, the court ruled that there was no evidence of match fixing, and there was no cupola or "Moggi system", as was reported by La Gazzetta dello Sport. Finally, referee selections were done in accordance with the rules of the FIGC, phone calls made by Moggi to referee designator Paolo Bergamo did not constitute in itself a sporting illicit, and there was no organization of yellow cards to give. Nonetheless, the sentence stated that "though Moggi didn't exercise his ability to condition matches, he still possessed the ability", and even though there were no Article 6 violations against Juventus, it introduced the much-disputed illecito associativo ("associative illicit") violation; the given motivation was that "Juventus' advantage was evidenced by their position in the standings at the end of the season."

On 28 July 2006, CAF judge Piero Sandulli said there were no illicits and the championship was regular. He commented: "The 2004/2005 championship wasn't falsified. The only doubt we could have was about that strange match between Lecce and Parma, a match that we have seen and reviewed. However, it can't be said that the championship has been falsified. There may have been an attempt to fix it, but it would have needed four or five combinations." In an interview with la Repubblica the day prior, Mario Serio, the then-director of the private law department at the Palermo Faculty of Law and one of the five members of the CAF who signed the verdict, stated: "It wasn't a unanimous decision, it wasn't shared." Despite a lack of evidence regarding match fixing and no Article 6 violation, only Juventus was sentenced to be relegated to Serie B and stripped of their titles after taking into consideration the collective interests of the parties involved in the investigation. Serio added: "We tried to interpret a collective sentiment. We listened to ordinary people and tried to put ourselves on the wavelength." According to Serio, while Juventus was relegated, the other clubs "were saved"; this happened "because people wanted it that way", referencing sentimento popolare ("people's feelings"). Serio said he wanted to convict then-FIGC president Franco Carraro and remove Milan from European competitions but Sandulli, Salvatore Catalano, and Mario Sanino put him into minority. Milan was saved because then-Milan vice-president Adriano Galliani stated that he was not aware of Milan referee clerk Leonardo Meani's behavior; this was proved to be false in later wiretaps and developments. Serio added: "We recognized everything about the CAF ruling, apart from two episodes: the falsified championship, the repeated offences of Juventus, [and] the existence of a system." Corrado De Biase, 1980 Totonero chief investigator, commented on the sentence of Francesco Saverio Borrelli, who spoke of a structured illicit as a crime committed by Moggi and his associates. He said: "We're talking about a structured illicit. But what is it? It doesn't exist. They want to make it clear that there's something different, anomalous. But structured illicit, not at all. There's no sporting illicit. We can't talk about things that don't exist in the sports judicial system. I still haven't seen any proof of sporting illicit. Until now, what I see is the violation of Article 1 of the Sports Justice Code, which requires members to behave according to the principles of loyalty, correctness, and probity. But of what we have read to date, it doesn't prove to me that there was an attempt to alter a match."

The CAF ruling was long disputed because of the severity of the punishment meted out to Juventus compared to the other clubs involved. The verdict remains controversial, as Juventus was charged with Article 1 violations, like the other involved clubs, and did not violate Article 6, but it was the sole club to be relegated. Juventus was charged of Article 6 violations through structured illicit, which was not part of the Code of Sports Justice, and was added to the new Code of Sports Justice after the scandal; accordingly, Juventus was charged with Article 6 violations through repeated Article 1 violations. As summarized by Carlo Garganese for Goal, "[the FIGC sentence] stated perfectly clearly [sic] that no Article 6 violations (match-fixing/attempted match-fixing breaks the sixth article of the sporting code) were found within the intercepted calls and the season was fair and legitimate, but that the ex-Juventus directors nonetheless demonstrated they could potentially benefit from their exclusive relationship with referee designators Gianluigi Pairetto and Paolo Bergamo. There were, however, no requests for specific referees, no demands for favours and no conversations between Juventus directors and referees themselves." Calciopoli bis and the Naples trial showed that many other clubs were involved, which weakened the prosecutor's argument of Juventus' exclusivity, the main reason for the club's harsher punishment; according to Garganese, "their mere existence meant that the theory of Juventus' 'exclusivity' could no longer hold", and "for the first time credibility shifted in favour of those who had claimed that Moggi, Giraudo and Juventus had been the victims of a witch-hunt."

Another controversy was that related to Juventus' defence lawyer Cesare Zaccone, who stated that "a punitive relegation to the second division would be acceptable." In later years, Zaccone would clarify that he made the statement because Juventus was the only club risking more than one-division relegation (Serie C), as at that time only a few clubs were implicated and Juventus appeared to be the main culprit, and he meant for Juventus to have equal treatment with the other clubs, which were also risking to be relegated; only Juventus would be relegated, resulting in the club's appeal for damage claims in the subsequent years against the FIGC due to unequal treatment. Some critics and observers, including as judge De Biase, journalist and former Tuttosport director Giancarlo Padovan, Ju29ro, (Note: Ju29ro was a website with documents containing the transcription of wiretaps and analyses on the scandal; it also retained court documents and verdicts, among others, and was widely cited and relied on by major newspapers, including La Gazzetta dello Sport, of which the website was critical. News outlets, such as Il Sussidario, relied on Ju29ro for new wiretaps and their transcripts. According to Tuttosport, "Ju29ro ... is interesting regardless of how you think about Calciopoli and its surroundings. For the first time in the history of [football] supporters in Italy, a group of fans made their professionalism (as lawyers, accountants, communication experts) available to defend their team, to learn more about what the vast majority of the media ... didn't want to deepen due to laziness, sloppiness, or prejudgice." Journalist Guido Vaciago described it as "[s]ided, of course, but with great professional clarity, never with fanatic coarseness, often with a touch of irony.") and journalists, such as Oliviero Beha and Angelo Furgione, alleged that Calciopoli and its aftermath were also a dispute within Juventus and between the club's owners, who wanted to get rid of Moggi and Giraudo, both of whom assumed an increased role in the club. Whatever their intentions, it is argued they condemned Juventus, firstly when Zaccone asked for relegation and point-deduction, and secondly when Montezemolo retired Juventus' appeal to the Lazio Regional Administrative Court (TAR), which amounted, as recounted by Corriere della Sera journalist Mario Sconcerti, to "a sort of public plea bargain" and guilty admission. (Note: Giovanni Cobolli Gigli, the Juventus chairman at the time, defended the club's choice. In 2014, he said: "As has already been said several times, we had received heavy warnings and pressure from UEFA which had threatened to exclude us from international competitions for the next few years. And at that point we were cornered and inevitably had to act that way. ... And I repeat, it was an inevitable decision to avoid heavy sanctions and very much negative repercussions for the club's future." In February 2019, Cobolli Gigli denied that it was a public plea bargain, and said: "The plea deal is an act of cowards and Juventus did not negotiate during Calciopoli, [we] simply accepted the sentence.") The club's legend and historic president until 1990 Giampiero Boniperti instead said: "Zaccone got it all right, we have to thank him, if it weren't for him, we'd be in Serie C now, we're lucky to be in Serie B. I'm a Juventus fan more than anyone, with this club, I've won 14 out of 29 Scudetti, and with all my heart, I say let's let things go smoothly. Let's turn the page and forget about what happened". In a 2020 interview with la Repubblica, Zaccone said he is a supporter of Torino, Juventus' derby rival, and revealed to have defended Juventus for money.

=== Effect on Serie A and club appeals ===
Initially, with Juventus, Fiorentina, and Lazio all relegated, Messina, Lecce, and Treviso would have remained in Serie A, despite finishing in the bottom three in the 2005–06 season. After the appeals, only Messina remained in Serie A. Clubs promoted from Serie B (Atalanta, Catania, and Torino) were unaffected and promoted to Serie A as normal. Based on the preliminary final league positions, Juventus and Milan would have earned a direct entry into the UEFA Champions League, Inter Milan and Fiorentina would have entered the third qualifying round of the Champions League, while Roma, Lazio, and ChievoVerona would have been eligible for the UEFA Cup. On 6 June 2006, the FIGC officially withdrew from the 2006 UEFA Intertoto Cup, costing Palermo a place in the third round of the competition, citing the fact that the 2005–06 Serie A standings could not be confirmed by the 5 June deadline. UEFA gave the FIGC a 25 July deadline to confirm the standings or face sanctions in the two larger European competitions, which was then extended to 26 July. After the appeals, Inter Milan, Roma, ChievoVerona, and Milan occupied Italy's four places for the 2006–07 UEFA Champions League. Inter Milan and Roma received a direct entry into the Champions League, while ChievoVerona and Milan started at the third qualifying round. Milan's entry was confirmed by UEFA shortly after the appeals process, and Milan went on to win the competition. Palermo, Livorno, and Parma took the 2006–07 UEFA Cup first-round slots originally given to Roma, Lazio, and ChievoVerona.

The clubs sent down to Serie B were initially expected to have a difficult road back to the top flight, as they would have had to finish in the top two of Serie B to be assured of promotion, and also had to avoid finishing in the bottom four to avoid being relegated to Serie C1. Juventus was initially docked 30 points, the equivalent of having ten wins nullified; the point penalty was later reduced to nine points, and went on to win Serie B in the 2006–07 season to make a swift return to Serie A. Fiorentina was docked fifteen points, was expected to struggle in Serie A, and faced an outside chance of relegation the following season but finished the 2006–07 Serie A season in sixth place, earning a place in the 2007–08 UEFA Cup. The relegation of Juventus also prompted a mass exodus of important players, such as Fabio Cannavaro, Emerson, Zlatan Ibrahimović, Lilian Thuram, Patrick Vieira, and Gianluca Zambrotta; some thirty other Serie A players who participated at the 2006 FIFA World Cup opted to move to other European leagues in the wake of the scandal. Notably, Juventus captain Alessandro Del Piero and fellow stars Gianluigi Buffon, Mauro Camoranesi, Pavel Nedved, and David Trezeguet, including future defence's cornerstone Giorgio Chiellini and young stars like Claudio Marchisio, stayed through "the purgatory of Serie B". Notably, Del Piero defended his decision to remain at Juventus, referencing the club's nickname, "The Old Lady", and said that "a true gentleman never leaves his lady." Juventus rebuilt from the ground up, restructured their management team, built a new stadium, and renegotiated a number of key sponsorship contracts for the future. By the 2020s, the club had won a record-breaking nine-consecutive Serie A championships with three different coaches (former Juventus player Antonio Conte, Massimiliano Allegri, and Maurizio Sarri), along with four Coppa Italia and consecutive domestic doubles, four Supercoppa Italiana, and reached two UEFA Champions League finals, in 2015 and 2017, respectively. In a twist of fate, Calciopoli nemesis Inter Milan and former coach Conte ended Juventus' unprecedented Serie A run in 2021.

On 26 October, the second appeal reduced Lazio's penalty to three points, Juventus' reduced to nine points, and Fiorentina's reduced to fifteen points, while Milan was unsuccessful and still faced with an eight-point deduction. Juventus previously announced that they planned to appeal the punishment in the Italian civil courts, an action that would have brought further punishment to the clubs and the FIGC by FIFA, as FIFA has historically taken a dim view to government involvement in football administration. FIFA and UEFA announced that they had the option to suspend the FIGC, barring all Italian clubs from international play, if Juventus went to court; some analysts, such as ESPN, described them as "FIFA threats". After the FIGC threatened to freeze all Italian competition, which could have resulted Italy's national team not taking part at the UEFA Euro 2008 qualifying, Juventus dropped its appeal before the TAR on 31 August, the day before it was due to be heard; Italian National Olympic Committee (CONI) president Gianni Petrucci thanked John Elkann and Luca Cordero di Montezemolo, and FIFA president Sepp Blatter thanked Juventus, particularly Montezemolo, for dropping the appeal. Juventus officials cited the "willingness shown by sportive institutions [the FIGC and CONI] to review its case during [CONI's] arbitration." In retrospect, this decision in particular is criticized because it could have cleared Juventus' name and avoided relegation. In addition, some critics alleged that the decision could also be partially explained by Montezemolo's relations with then-Inter Milan vice-president Marco Tronchetti Provera, who was also owner of Inter Milan's sponsor Telecom Italia, which would go on in 2007 to sponsor Scuderia Ferrari, of which Montezemolo was president; Montezemolo was also Confindustria president, while Tronchetti Provera was Confindustria vice-president. Both Montezemolo and Tronchetti Provera were implicated in the SISMI-Telecom scandal, but they were not processually involved. In a la Repubblica interview, Telecom's old security guided by Giuliano Tavaroli dismissed the theory that the Telecom management was unaware of those spying operations, saying that they were worried about protecting Montezemolo, its favourite candidate for the Confindustria presidency.

=== Inter Milan's controversial 2006 scudetto assignation ===
On 26 July, the FIGC declared Inter Milan as the Italian football champion for the 2005–06 season. (Note: Some observers said that even though Rossi justified the decision due to UEFA needing which clubs would take part to its European competitions, UEFA only needed a final standing to known the seven clubs that would take part to its competitions, and there was no need to crown a champion. The decision itself was even more controversial because the 2005–06 title was assigned ad personam by Rossi, and not by the FIGC or Lega Calcio, on the basis of a joint decision of the Three Sages; one of them abstained and the other was against the re-assignation to another team, while only former UEFA general secretary Gerhard Aigner voted in favour. In 2010, Aigner said that Juventus and Milan were the main culprits, while the referees and Inter Milan and the other clubs were the victims. Roberto Pardolesi, one of the three members of the commission chaired by Aigner, who with a legal opinion gave the green light to the reassignment of the 2006 championship after the revocation of Juventus due to the Calciopoli events, stated: "If there are new elements, obviously the procedure would have to be re-instructed.") Regarding this decision, Carlo Porceddu, federal prosecutor from 1998 to 2001 and vice-president of the Federal Court of Appeal, stated in an interview with Unione Sarda: "Revoking the 2005/2006 scudetto from Juventus and assigning to Inter Milan was a serious mistake. The Calciopoli investigation should have been more thorough, so much so that we, as the Federal Court, had limited the penalty to Juventus not withdrawing the championship title due to insufficient evidence. In fact, that aspect had been neglected. Then, the special commissioner of the [Italian Football] Federation of that period had appointed a group of his friends, one of whom was also on the board of directors of Inter Milan, and that title was revoked from Juventus and given to Inter Milan. That was a grave error in my view." Purceddu also highlighted how several aspects of the investigation needed to be clarified.

Franco Carraro, Rossi's predecessor, was another critic of Rossi's decision, especially because, as Carraro recalled years later, "a month later Rossi goes to be president of Telecom for the second time, whose largest shareholder is Marco Tronchetti Provera, vice-president of Inter Milan." (Note: Carraro said that Juventus was the best team and had legitimately won on the pitch, and opined that only the 1997–98 Serie A season was altered due to an alleged missed penalty kick in the Juventus–Inter Milan second leg match, in which contact between Mark Iuliano and Ronaldo was not called as foul by referee Piero Ceccarini, and which was won by Juventus 1–0; Alessandro Del Piero, who had already scored the decisive goal, also missed a penalty kick, and his club would have remained first had the match ended in a draw, as Juventus was first with 66 points and Inter Milan second with 65, and the championship ended with Juventus first with 76 points and Inter Milan second with 69 points. In addition, while the episode fueled vehement skirmishes between the opposing factions, which monopolized the Italian media in the following days, even landing in the Italian Parliament and coming close to a crisis within the FIGC, the claim is unproven, as the season in question has never been investigated, and Carraro himself was the-then president of Lega Nazionale Professionisti. The controversy costed Fabio Baldas his job as referee designator, he was replaced by Sergio Gonella in the 1998-1999 season with a full draw for the referees, a system that lasted only one year, and then another system with the referees to be assigned by draw and the appointment of Bergamo–Pairetto to protect everyone's interests. Some observers cited the irony of this due to the latter duo implication in the scandal. Baldas was also involved in wiretapping in 2006 scandal while working as a video referee analyst in the famous Italian TV show "Il Processo di Biscardi", in the conversations Moggi ordered him to tamper with the 3D images of a clearly offside to make it look like a slight one and to judge positively the refereeing of the match on television. Ceccarini declared himself unable to judge the action, having only witnessed its final part; over the years, he provided conflicting versions on his a posteriori evaluation of the foul, oscillating between the assignment of a penalty or an indirect free kick for Inter Milan, and granting a direct free kick in favour of Juventus; he ultimately found his decision to be correct, and said that his only mistake was not giving Juventus the offensive foul.) Piero Sandulli, president of the FIGC National Court of Appeal, was against giving the scudetto to Inter Milan, and stated to have been criticized at that time for it; in later years, Sandulli reiterated that the title should not have been assigned to Inter Milan. The decision was further condemned because of Inter Milan's involvement, among other clubs not originally implicated, which could not be put on trial due to the statute of limitations. This caused a dispute between the FIGC, Inter Milan, and Juventus. Although it was deemed likely, or almost certain, that the FIGC would revoke Inter Milan's scudetto, and despite Juventus' appeals to have it revoked even without giving it back to Juventus, it did not happen; the FIGC's Federal Council voted to declare itself not competent. (Note: At the time of the vote, on whether the FIGC was competent to make a decision regarding Inter Milan's assigned scudetto, both Lega Serie B president Andrea Abodi and Lazio president Claudio Lotito showed their disagreement with the decision taken by leaving the room. As Cagliari president Massimo Cellino and Lega Serie A president Maurizio Beretta did not take part to the vote (the former left due to personal reasons, while the latter was absent due to out-of-work reasons), no other Serie A's club president and executive voted; the only vote in favour of the FIGC being competent to take a decision was expressed by councilor Dante Cudicio of the AIC, an association of coaches.)

== Later developments and trials ==
=== SIM cards and wiretaps ===
By April 2007, some new details about the Calciopoli affair were disclosed, as Naples prosecutors were able to find out a series of telephone calls through foreign SIM cards between Moggi, Bergamo, Pairetto, and several referees. Since the conversations were through foreign SIM cards, the Italian police could not tap them, so they could only try to match together phone numbers, numbers called, and places; nonetheless, it were those SIM cards that ultimately proved, not without controversy, to be the reason for Moggi's conviction, whose charges had been reduced to be close enough to "the limit of the existence of the crime of attempt". The SIM cards had been purchased in a store in Chiasso (Switzerland); some SIM cards were Swiss and registered to the store owner's family, while the others came from an anonymous person in Liechtenstein. The prosecutors also discovered the use of a Slovenian SIM card. In this investigation they involved Moggi, Pairetto, Bergamo, Fabiani (Messina sporting director), the referees De Santis, Racalbuto, Paparesta, Pieri, Cassarà, Dattilo, Bertini, and Gabriele, and the referee assistant Ambrosino. According to this investigation, Paparesta also used the Swiss SIM card for personal use and this helped the prosecutors to discover this secret communication channel. Apparently, Moggi had five foreign SIM cards, two of which had been used to communicate with Bergamo and Pairetto, whereas the others had supposed to have been used to communicate with the referees and Fabiani. Moreover, another wiretap was unveiled by the Italian daily La Stampa. Although containing nothing truly compromising, it recorded Moggi and Marcello Lippi (former coach of Juventus and coach of Italy national football team at that time) insulting Inter Milan president Massimo Moratti and Inter Milan coach Roberto Mancini. Lippi stated that Mancini deserved a lesson, while Moggi answered that Mancini would have such a lesson.

On 26 April 2007, about two hundred audio files of the wiretaps, some published one year before in the written form and some never published, were released; this allowed readers to perceive tones and forms of the conversations. Milan, originally ejected from the 2006–07 Champions League due to the scandal, went on to win the competition on 23 May. On 17 June, on the Italian show Qui studio a voi stadio, a popular football show broadcast by the local TV Telelombardia based in Milan, Bergamo said that Moggi gave two Swiss SIM cards to Pairetto, who then gave one of those SIM cards to him. Bergamo stated that, on suspicion of being tapped, he used that SIM card only to communicate with Pairetto and that, after the exhaustion of the credit, he did not use the SIM card anymore. In June 2008, Juventus was fined a further €300,000 in three installments, while Messina were fined €60,000. On 14 December 2009, Giraudo was sentenced to three years in prison.

In October 2008, chief prosecutor Giuseppe Narducci was quoted in court as saying: "Like it or not, no other calls exist between the designators and other directors." During the Calciopoli trial in Naples, the legal team of Moggi released a number of wiretaps showing that Inter Milan, (Note: In one notable wiretap, known as "the 5–4–4 phone call", referee designator Paolo Bergamo, who was charged to be part of Moggi's criminal association, called then-Inter Milan president Giacinto Facchetti on 11 May 2005, the eve of a Cagliari–Inter match, the semifinal of 2004–05 Coppa Italia, which ended 1–1. As published by Tuttosport, the wiretap was not part of the 74 phone calls brought to the court. The incriminated part, referring to the 4–4–4 score to be changed in 5–4–4, was transcribed as such: Facchetti: "Look, I saw Bertini's score with us, [and he] has 4 wins, 4 draws, and 4 defeats..." Bergamo: "Porca miseria, then we make it 5–4–4. But [5] victories." Facchetti: "But tell him that tomorrow is crucial. He refereed 12 matches, 4–4–4." Bergamo: "The score will change but will begin with W. Yes, I have to hear him. Don't worry, he understands how to walk: he's an intelligent boy, he understands. Better late than never." La Repubblica described the match as being refereed in favour of Inter Milan, commenting that "[Inter Milan goalkeeper] Carini makes a mess on a harmless ball that comes from the middle of the field, touching it with his hands a meter outside the area with practically no opponents in front: Bertini should eject him but only gives him a yellow-card (yet the rule would speak clearly), thus distorting the continuation of the match." Then-Cagliari president Massimo Cellino said: "You can see that they have to make Inter Milan win something [Inter Milan went on to win the 2005 Coppa Italia final against Roma]. At this point, I don't know if we need to go to [Inter Milan's stadium] San Siro next week." After the Cagliari–Inter Milan match, the referee Paolo Bertini called Bergamo to complain of Facchetti's behavior; Facchetti came to the locker room before the match to press him, and recalled him of Inter Milan's magre score with him. This wiretap, among others, which was already available at that time, and some critics, such as journalist Roberto Beccantini, stated they were "curiously hidden" in the first phase of the trials, contradicted the prosecution's allegations that only Moggi went in the locker room with referees before or after matches. Then-Inter Milan owner Massimo Moratti stated: "Going to the referees before and after the match was normal." In addition, in the same 5–4–4 phone call, Bergamo asked to Facchetti whether Mario Mazzoleni and Paolo Mazzoleni were a good referee designation for Inter Milan's match against Juventus, and if he could be given four tickets to the match for a client.) as well as Milan, (Note: In one notable wiretap, Milan's Leonardo Meani complained of referee Duccio Baglioni to referee designator Gennaro Mazzei for Milan's loss against Siena. Meani continued in his complaints, not accepting the justifications of Mazzei, to whom he says: "I really don't want him! No, I don't want him! I never asked or wanted him! Besides, now he tells me to be very careful! To not make another mistake because Galliani is furious! ... Then on Wednesday try to send two clever ones." Minutes later, Meani would again complain to the referee designator, and asked for Claudio Puglisi, to which the designator said it was fine. The next day, just one hour before the referee designations, Meani again called Mazzei to recommend him the designations of the next Milan matches because the Milan management was upset about it. About 40 minutes later, Meani called the referee assistant Fabrizio Babini, and told him in a triumphant tone that his complaints had the desired effect. Five minutes later, Meani called Puglisi, telling him: "If we have to make war for good, we also make war against Juve." Meani then called on Puglisi to not call offside, if in doubt, when Milan is attacking. A few hours later, Meani again called Puglisi to inform him that he also suggested to Babini the attitude, favourable to Milan, he would have to assume during the match. About one hour later, Meani once again called Babini, this time to recall the attitude he would have to keep. The next day, Meani informed Adriano Galliani (Lega Calcio president and Milan vice-president), and kept him informed after Galliani asked him if he had spoken with the referee designators. Before and after the public revelation of wiretaps implicating many other clubs, several observers described this call as an Article 6 violation, with some describing it as "the only real sporting illicit of this whole squalid business.") had been involved in the Serie A scandal during 2004 and 2005. Such wiretaps involved Milan vice-president Adriano Galliani, Milan employee Leonardo Meani, Inter Milan owner Massimo Moratti, then-Inter Milan president Giacinto Facchetti, (Note: While the 5–4–4 phone call was the most notable, Facchetti had several other calls with Bergamo, who also had calls with Moratti, and at least one with Pairetto, who asked for tickets. In a wiretap dated 24 March 2005, Facchetti called Massimo De Santis. The two discussed about the De Santis' upcoming international match and Milan's derby. At the beginning of the phone call, they talk about Walter Gagg, at that time head of the FIFA stadiums commission and a friend of Facchetti and FIFA president Joseph Blatter. Facchetti told De Santis that Gagg would also go to Paris for the match, and he would greet him. In a televised intervention after the Calciopoli scandal broke out, De Santis said that there was a FIFA executive who called him "by name and on behalf of an Inter Milan executive. One day I will name him.") and former referee designators Paolo Bergamo and Pierluigi Pairetto, as well as many other Italian clubs not previously mentioned in the scandal.

During the October 2010 industrial espionage case against Telecom Italia (SISMI-Telecom scandal), Tronchetti Provera (Pirelli president and former CEO, Inter Milan shareholder and former vice-president, and former Telecom president), confirmed the statements delivered by Caterina Plateo (former Telecom employee) in her testimony that the company was spying on members of the football realm on behalf of Inter Milan; these revelations were brought to the Naples trial. When Calciopoli's chief investigator Colonnel Attilio Auricchio was cross-examined by Moggi's lawyer, it was revealed that he had tampered evidence prior to handing it over to the sporting tribunal in 2006. According to Carlo Garganese, Auricchio did this "by pulling out the thousands upon thousands of calls made by directors and coaches to referee designators that would have shown no one had an exclusive relationship." Inter Milan's implicating calls, among other clubs', which were not ordered to be transcribed, were signed with three moustache-like red lines to indicate the grade of gravity.

In September 2011, Salvatore Racalbuto's lawyer Giacomo Mungiello stated: "No probative value can be attributed to the Swiss SIM cards themselves. According to the prosecutor, the cell phone would have hooked up the cell near Racalbuto's house in Gallarate on the evening of the match. Today we produce a document which shows that on both occasions the referee slept in the hotel the same evening and didn't return home. Among the texts heard, there was Coppola, who told us that he had presented himself to the Carabinieri, invited by Borrelli's appeal, and that he had told them to tell them something about Inter Milan, but the Carabinieri didn't want to know and they were interested only in Juventus, which tells us all about the way the investigation went."

=== Palazzi's 2011 report and Naples developments ===
On 15 June 2011, six months prior to their initial five-year ban's expiration, the FIGC announced that Moggi, Giraudo, and Mazzini would be banned for life from any football-related roles in Italy. Despite popular perception of a match-fixing scandal and Calciopoli being referred to as match-fixing in association football, especially in the beginnings and its first phase, the sentence stated that no Article 6 (about match fixing or attempted match-fixing) violations were found within the intercepted calls, and the season was fair and legitimate. Furthermore, no requests for specific referees, no demands for favours, and no conversations between Juventus directors and referees themselves were found; their lifetime ban was because they could potentially benefit from their exclusive relations with referee designators.

In July 2011, the FIGC chief investigator Stefano Palazzi alleged in his report that, in addition to Moggi, other club officials violated the Code of Sporting Justice by contacting referee designators in illegal manners, which contradicted Moggi and Giraudo's exclusivity; they included Article 1 violations by Nello Governato (Brescia), Massimo Cellino (Cagliari), Luca Campedelli (ChievoVerona), Fabrizio Corsi (Empoli), Massimo Moratti (Inter Milan), Leonardo Meani (Milan), Rino Foschi (Palermo), Pasquale Foti (Reggina), Luciano Spalletti (Udinese), and Sergio Gasparin (Vicenza), and Article 6 violations by Giacinto Facchetti (Inter Milan), Leonardo Meani (Milan), and Aldo Spinelli (Livorno). According to Palazzi's findings, these clubs had to be punished during the Calciopoli trial, but no court could confirm these allegations since all facts are covered by the statute of limitation. In regard to Inter Milan's 2006 scudetto, Palazzi wrote: "Inter Milan appears to be the only club against which, in hypothesis, concrete consequences can arise on the sporting level, even if indirectly with respect to the outcome of the disciplinary procedure." In response to Palazzi's report, Giancarlo Abete, then-president of the FIGC, stated that there were no legal ground to revoke the title from Inter Milan; he hinted that Inter Milan should give away the title and leave it unassigned on the basis of ethics.

During the Naples trial, Moggi's lawyer Maurilio Prioreschi asked the court to take in consideration that between 2006 (the year of the first sentences) and 2011 (the year of the sentence on Moggi's lifetime ban) numerous hearings were held during the criminal trial in Naples, from which wiretaps involving other club executives that, according to Moggi's legal defence, would drop the basic assumption of the 2006 sports conviction, namely that relating to the conditioning of the referees thanks to the preferential treatment by the referee designators towards Moggi and Juventus, which in turn led to the sporting offence. Many of those wiretaps formed the body of Palazzi's report, with which the FIGC chief prosecutor intended to refer many executives and clubs for violations of the Code of Sports Justice, a circumstance that was prevented only by the statute of limitation. The court's Disciplinary Commission purposely ignored this defensive argument, and arguing that it was a reassessment of the facts not permitted at that time, no importance was given to the conduct of those other executives and clubs which had just emerged during the criminal trial. According to the FIGC's Federal Court of Justice, as explained in its judgment of appeal in regards to the term attualizzare ("actualize"), the court was there not to expand the evidence on which the first judgment was based but rather to ascertain whether at that time those established facts were still serious enough to justify a lifetime ban; it concluded that this ruling must be expressed exclusively "on the basis of the sentences rendered" against Moggi, and cannot take into consideration any comparative judgment with conducts possibly attributable to other subjects of the FIGC law. The court stated that to have a reassessment of the facts of Calciopoli, it would be necessary to request and open a revocation of judgment pursuant to Article 39 of the Code of Sports Justice.

On 8 November 2011, the Naples court issued the first conclusion of the criminal case against Moggi and the other football personalities involved, sentencing him to jail for five years and four months for criminal association. In December 2013, Moggi's sentence was reduced to two years and four months for being found guilty of conspiring to commit a crime; the earlier charge of sporting fraud passed the statute of limitations. On 17 March 2014, the Naples court confirmed Moggi, Pairetto, and Mazzini's conviction for the same charge. In its ruling's motivation, the court wrote of "a proven system already operating in the years 1999/2000 between the subjects, who along the lines of weaving 'friendly relations' were carrying out conduct aimed at phasing the real scope and potential of some football teams", to which Paolo Ziliani, a journalist who is known for his anti-Juventus claims, commented for Il Fatto Quotidiano that, even though three of them were won by clubs other than Juventus, they should be also revoked; no evidence was provided for the claim, (Note: As the most successful domestic club and one of the most titled clubs at the continental level, Juventus won its first scudetto in 1905, eight years after its founding, and dominated domestic competition by winning most championships and league cups since the 1930s; in addition, between the late 1970s and early 2000s, Juventus had a peak and groundbreaking success at the continental level, having won all UEFA competitions, and was awarded the UEFA Plaque. While some Juventus' critics alleged that the club only won throughout those years, especially between the mid-1990s and early 2000s, due to cheating and Moggi, observers, FIGC higher-ups, and rivals stated that Juventus was one of the best, if not the best, teams in these years and did not need any help, and its players deserved the two championships revoked but won on the pitch.) and none of the previous leagues were investigated. (Note: About the allegations, Moggi responded: "There's only one reality. When I was at Juve, we won two consecutive league titles at most. From 2000 to 2004, they were won by Lazio, Milan, and Roma. Lazio won because of the flood at the stadium with a 74-minute suspension of the [Perugia–Juventus] match. This was something that never happened before. Roma also won thanks to the Nakata case. They made us lose championships for irregular things, at that moment Juve was the weak side." In regards to the controversial 2000 Perugia–Juventus match, to which he regretted not having the team retire and go home, Moggi criticized the match's referee Pierluigi Collina. Collina was particularly liked before and during Calciopoli by Milan's and Rome's clubs, had the same Milan's sponsor, and secretly met with then-Milan's vice-president Adriano Galliani, who selected him as referee designator due to also being Lega Calcio president, at Milan's Leonardo Meani's restaurant. While he would be unaffected by Calciopoli, he was found to be close to Milan, of which he shared the same sponsor (Opel) without the consent of then-AIA president Tullio Lanese, leading to his resignement and retirement. Moggi stated: "I was accused of being the great manipulator in football, so explain to me how I managed to lose a championship by playing the decisive match in a pool. The truth is that Juve should have left, instead we remained there at the mercy of those who decided and when we took the field we were no longer there. [Collina] certainly spoke to someone on the phone: who it was, we will never know. I'm just saying that by regulation the suspension can't last more than 45 minutes: instead Collina waited almost double." In later years, Moggi further commented: "As it happens, it then comes out of the wiretaps that Collina goes to talk to Galliani and says: 'I will come at midnight, I enter the back door so they don't see me.' If Milan couldn't win, they didn't want Juventus to win either." After retiring, Collina said that before he started refereeing, that he was a Lazio and Bologna supporter.) Of the indicated allegedly altered championships, Juventus won four of them (2001–02, 2002–03, 2004–05, and 2005–06), one of which (2001–02) was won in the last match and became known as "the scudetto of 5 May", (Note: The 2001–02 championship won by Juventus was unexpected, as Inter Milan, who was first (69 points), followed by Juventus (68 points), and Roma (67 points), collapsed in the last match, in one of the most emotional season-ending days. While Juventus defeated Udinese 2–0, Inter Milan was defeated by Lazio 4–2 in a surreal atmosphere, in which Lazio supporters cheered Inter Milan's players and jeered their own players, as they did not want derby's rival Roma to win the championship. As Roma defeated Torino 1–0, Inter Milan fell to third place.) and two of which (2004–05 and 2005–06) were the only ones to be revoked from Juventus, (Note: The 2005–06 was regular and never under investigation, while the 2004–05 was also deemed regular, as no match was altered.) while Lazio (1999–2000), (Note: Of the three championships not won by Juventus, in two of them (Lazio and Roma's) there were also some episodes controversial to Juventus' disadvantage. The 1999–00 championship was decided at the last match against Perugia, as Juventus was first and needed at least a draw to play the championship playoff match. Instead, also bad weather could have contributed in Perugia upsetting Juventus 1–0 thanks to Alessandro Calori's goal after the match's suspension ended, with Juventus failing to equalise with almost 40 minutes remaining, with Gianluca Zambrotta also being ejected for a second yellow card in the 73rd minute; the match became known as the diluvio di Perugia ("Perugia's flood [match]"). The match was suspended for 74 minutes, violating the rules of no more than 45 minutes, and should have been postponed according to some observers. At the same time, Lazio was playing against Reggina, which had avoided relegation and lacked motivation, and won 3–0, with two penalty kicks given in five minutes after thirty minutes. With its team losing, Juventus' Gianluca Pessotto was given an offensive throw-in; in a sportive action, Pessotto nodded to the referee that he was the last one to touch the ball, and the throw-in was given to Perugia. Then-Juventus player Antonio Conte recalled: "We immediately understood that the match would never be postponed for fear that Lazio players would arrive from Rome and riots would break out. During the week we had received very hard attacks, they were all against us." Calori recalled: "The mess that occurred on the penultimate [championship] day after the Juve–Parma episodes weighed heavily [in regard to the decision to not postpone the match]: Lazio tifosi shouted scandal and came to blows with the police." The Juventus Parma much contested episode was a clearly regular goal scored by Parma's defender Fabio Cannavaro, disallowed by referee De Santis for no apparent reason; De Santis will later be one of the main referees involved in Calciopoli scandal. Of the 1999–00 championship, Carlo Ancelotti, Juventus coach from 1999 to 2001 and Milan coach at the time of Calciopoli, stated in his 2010 deposition that he found only the Perugia match to be "an odd fact".) Roma (2000–01), (Note: The 2000–01 championship was affected by Passaportopoli (a scandal about illegal transfers of foreign players without continental passports, which were falsified), of which Juventus was one of the few clubs not involved. Hidetoshi Nakata, Roma's midfielder implicated in the scandal, scored a goal in Juventus–Roma (2–2), which proved decisive to the championship's fate.) and Milan (2003–04) each won one scudetto, (Note: The 2003–04 championship was won by Milan, which had defeated Juventus to penalty shoot-out in the Champions League final the year prior. Juventus was disadvantaged in the two league matches against Milan, with both Milan's Jon Dahl Tomasson (1–1) and Andriy Shevchenko scoring offside goals; the former in the first leg match, which ended 1–1, and the latter in opening the second leg match, which ended 1–3. For the latter, the referee designators maintained their position of regularity. Although he would resign on 22 June 2006 due to Calciopoli, many clubs were already opposed to then-Milan vice-president Adriano Galliani's reelection to Lega Calcio presidency. Several of those arguments were used by defendants charged of forming a criminal association with Moggi to favour Juventus; some critics also found those to be inconsistencies to the alleged claim of many championships being altered, and of Moggi's criminal association with only a few referee designators and one referee found guilty and convicted.) respectively. The first alleged altered championship was the 1997-1998, with the Juventus–Inter Milan' second leg match in Turin famous for the penalty not awarded to Ronaldo, and the only year with Fabio Baldas as referee designator. Moggi's charge, as written in the Naples sentence, was not that he fixed matches or leagues but that his behavior was close enough to "the limit of the existence of the crime of attempt", hence the conviction; none of the allegations were proven but the holding of Swiss sim cards was deemed to be enough to justify the crime of attempt and conviction.

=== Supreme Court sentence and Juventus' appeals ===
On 23 March 2015, the Supreme Court of Cassation, Italy's highest court of appeal, ruled in its final resolution, which came after six hours of deliberation, that Moggi was acquitted of "some individual charges for sporting fraud, but not from being the 'promoter' of the 'criminal conspiracy' that culminated in Calciopoli." The remaining charges of Moggi were cancelled without a new trial due to the statute of limitations; Giraudo's sentence also expired in March 2015. Appeals by Fiorentina owners Andrea and Diego Della Valle and Lazio president Claudio Lotito against their sentences were rejected on the same ground, as their cases passed the statute of limitations. The court accepted the prosecutor's request to clear charges of former referees Paolo Bertini, Antonio Dattilo, and Gennaro Mazzei but rejected the appeals for Massimo De Santis and Savaltore Racabulto. Shortly after the court's decision, the then-FIGC president Carlo Tavecchio remarked in an interview with ANSA that "while the motivations may be pending, the sentence confirms the thesis of the prosecution", and "the crimes were real and so was the criminal conspiracy." In response to the final verdict, Moggi said: "We mucked about for nine years and that's not nice because this abnormal trial has come to nothing. Just a lot of expense. In nine years, it has been established that the championship was by the book, the draws were by the book and there were no conversations about designations." He added that it let the courts off the hook, not him, and vowed to turn to the European courts to have his ban from football world lifted.

On 9 September 2015, the Supreme Court released a 150-page document that explained its final ruling of the case. As reported by Milan-based La Gazzetta dello Sport, although Moggi's remaining charges being cancelled without a new trial due to statute of limitations, the court made clear that Moggi's unwarranted activities incurred significant damage to Italian football not only in sporting, but also in economic terms. In the document, the court confirmed that Moggi was actively involved in the sporting fraud which was intended to favour Juventus and increase his own personal benefits; according to Gazzetta World, the document also stated that Moggi had "unjustified and excessive power within Italian football", which he used to exert influence over referees, other club officials, and the media, thereby creating "an illegal system to condition matches of the 2004/05 championship (and not just those)." Turin-based Tuttosport reported: "Justice decided that Moggi and Giraudo actually 'polluted' the system, it decided so in 2006 and didn't want to know or understand other truths. Indeed, it had already decided it during the investigations, when all the phone calls that could exonerate or alleviate the position of Juventus' executives had not been taken into consideration, to the point of dismantling the very concept of the Cupola. Moggi and Giraudo, therefore, 'polluted' the system: a term that serves to dodge the fact that no judge has ever returned enough evidence to affirm that championship (the subject of investigation was only 2004–05) has actually been altered. Indeed, in the first instance sentence we basically read the opposite." The Supreme Court commented that "the system of the arrangement of the [referee] grids was rather widespread", and the developments in the behavior of Inter Milan's Giacinto Facchetti and Milan's Leonardo Meani were not "deepened by the investigations". On 15 March 2017, Moggi's lifetime ban was definitively confirmed on final appeal.

Having been cleared of wrongdoings and not being liable by other clubs because the 2004–05 season was deemed regular, Juventus appealed to have the two league titles back and damage claims due to disparity of treatment in the sporting trial. In September 2016, the District Court rejected the claim from Juventus because it had no jurisdiction over CONI arbitration chamber's decision made in October 2006. In December 2018, the Supreme Court upheld this District Court's decision on technical grounds. In January 2019, Juventus handed another appeal to sports tribunal under CONI to have the 2005–06 Serie A title removed from Inter Milan. The appeal was rejected on 6 May 2019. Further appeals were rejected in 2022 as not admissible.

== Verdicts ==
Initial verdicts (bans July 2006, sentences November 2011) handed out to the following individuals:

- Luciano Moggi: five-year ban from football and five years and four months' imprisonment; acquitted in 2015
- Antonio Giraudo: five-year ban from football and three years' imprisonment; acquitted in 2015
- Tullio Lanese: thirty-month ban from football
- Innocenzo Mazzini: five-year ban from football and 26 months' imprisonment
- Massimo De Santis: four-year ban from football and 23 months' imprisonment
- Diego Della Valle: forty-five-month ban from football and fifteen months' imprisonment
- Andrea Della Valle: three-year ban from football and fifteen months' imprisonment
- Pierluigi Pairetto: forty-two-month ban from football and sixteen months' imprisonment
- Pasquale Foti: thirty-month ban from football and fined €30,000
- Claudio Lotito: thirty-month ban from football and seventeen months' imprisonment
- Leonardo Meani: thirty-month ban from football and one year's imprisonment
- Sandro Mencucci: thirty-month ban from football and fifteen months' imprisonment
- Fabrizio Babini: three-month ban from football
- Gennaro Mazzei: six-month ban from football
- Adriano Galliani: nine-month ban from football
- Gianluca Paparesta: three-month ban from football
- Claudio Puglisi: three-month ban from football and one year's imprisonment and fined €20,000
- Franco Carraro: fined €80,000
- Salvatore Racalbuto: one year and eight months' imprisonment
- Paolo Bertini: seventeen months' imprisonment
- Antonio Dattilo: seventeen months' imprisonment
- Stefano Titomanlio: one year's imprisonment and fined €20,000

== Impact and reception ==
The scandal hit hard on Italian football, with its top league (Serie A) being considered the top European league, one of the best, and the golden age of football throughout the 1980s and the 1990s. The case remains controversial and divisive, especially between the FIGC, Inter Milan, and Juventus, mainly due to Juventus' harsh punishment, as well as the FIGC's decision to have the 2005–06 scudetto assigned to Inter Milan, both of which are criticized, and resulted in Italian football decline and supporters' exodus. It also did not stop the development of further scandals, such as the 2011–12 Italian football match-fixing scandal (Scomessopoli). In September 2011, the polling company Demos & Pi published in la Repubblica, found that of those in the population who defined themselves as tifosi dropped from 52% to 45%; in addition, the poll showed that 55% of tifosi were suspicious whenever a referee makes a mistake. The poll found that 56.5% of the sample examined was sceptical of the regularity of the decisions taken by sports justice, while 24.9% judged the Calciopoli scandal "as a case of sports justice that led to the right decisions." (Note: A September 2010 poll by Mediaset showed that a majority of tifosi saw Moggi as a victim of Calciopoli and Juventus as the scapegoat of a system that did not belong only to him; 68% of tifosi agreed that Juventus "was the only one really punished", while 32% said that "faults of others do not cancel those of Juve".) 43.5% of the same sample said that the 2005–06 title "[should] not be awarded to anyone", compared to 33.7% who believed that the title should remain at Inter Milan, or be given to other clubs. In addition, the poll revealed that Juventus remained the most supported club at 30%, followed by Inter Milan at 19%, and Milan at 16%, while Inter Milan became the most hated, surpassing Juventus; polarization increased, with 10% more supporters expressing hatred towards at least one club, for a total of 50%, and with militant, ultras groups holding a bigger share of tifo. When Juventus returned to win in an unprecedented nine-year consecutive championship run, (Note: In 2012, Juventus won its first scudetto since Calciopoli, starting a record nine-consecutive championship wins; very few, if any, clubs congratulated Juventus for this unprecedented result, and only for Inter Milan's win in 2021 during the COVID-19 pandemic there were calls for a pasillo (a walkaway of honour). Juventus refused doing it for Inter Milan, as no club did it during its nine-years winning streak; Juventus congratulated Inter Milan through Twitter.) even as the club was absolved and no match involving Juventus was altered, discussions and accusations without evidence, as no other championship other than that of 2004–05 has been investigated, "a new Calciopoli" emerged. (Note: Inter Milan and Milan were the top clubs most favoured by Calciopoli and Juventus' relegation. After its revealed implication in later years, Inter Milan was not put on trial due to the statute of limitation, and Milan received only a point-penalty, enough for the club to take the last available place in the standings for that year's Champions League, which the club went on to win; some observers and UEFA, which changed the rules after the scandal, said that it should not have been admitted. Inter Milan and Milan won the next five championships (four by Inter Milan, and one by Milan). Some analysts, such as Mario Sconcerti, stated in later years that while Inter Milan and Milan were favoured the most by the power vacuum left by Juventus, this was also their own long-term downfall. Sconcerti commented: "The real hub was Calciopoli. The current great Juve was born in the nine years in the transition between l'Avvocato Umberto Agnelli, from Trapattoni's last championship in 1986 to that of Lippi in 1995. A time that is an eternity for Juve. All this forced Juve to accelerate strongly. And there was born the push that then leads to Calciopoli, that is to say a forcing before returning to win. Calciopoli — and what follows at Juve — forces Inter Milan and Milan to invest a lot to take advantage of the power vacuum. And yet it makes them explode. Investment becomes the straw that breaks the camel's back. Neither Moratti nor Berlusconi can take it anymore, and he himself has said so in these hours.")

Supporters of the trials, such as the public prosecutor Giuseppe Narducci, journalist Marco Travaglio, and coach Zdeněk Zeman cite Moggi's guilty verdict, and the court's view that he was the promoter of the criminal behavior that culminated in Calciopoli process as evidence that the scandal was real. Critics respond that the first investigation was conducted too hastily, question why wiretaps implicated many other clubs were not revealed earlier, and state that it was not legal, as wiretaps were obtained through illegal means, or that too much weight was given to them, and many of Moggi's wiretaps were decontextualized. In addition, they argue that convictions, such as Moggi's, did not give weight to later developments, such as several points of the prosecution being contradicted, other clubs' involvement which was not considered due to the fact they came to light after the statute of limitation, that the season was deemed fair and legitimate, as no match result was altered, and Juventus did not violate Article 6 (sporting illicit, which warrants relegation), and was only charged through a newly made-up rule in the Code of Sports Justice after the events, while other clubs (Inter Milan, Livorno, and Milan) were found to have directly violated Article 6 according to the FIGC chief investigator Stefano Palazzi, whose earlier charges in the first phase were mostly confirmed. Moggi's legal defence asked the Naples court to take this in consideration but the court denied it, arguing that it was a reassessment of the facts not permitted at that time.

Juventus' harsh punishment was subjected to criticism, even more so due to later developments and investigations, and several critics argue that only Juventus was truly punished, while other clubs or executives were not punished as harshly, or got away from it, and Italian football is in no better shape than it was then. Juventus' owners and legal defence, especially in the first phase when they renounced their appeal to the TAR and did not defend the club effectively, is also criticized; some critics alleged that several Juventus' then-owners and board of directors took their personal interests and relations above that of the club, or that they wanted to get rid of Moggi and Giraudo, both of whom were becoming major Juventus shareholders. (Note: Both Moggi and Giraudo had good relations with the Agnelli family, especially Gianni and Umberto Agnelli, while they would have rocky relations with Agnelli's successors, with Luca Cordero di Montezemolo in particular, whom Moggi accused of being the culprit for Juventus' relegation. Moggi also stated that Calciopoli only happened because "l'Avvocato Agnelli and il Dottor Umberto died", and had the two Agnelli not died, "nothing [of this farce] would have happened." Moggi stated that Juventus was weak, saying: "The death of l'Avvocato Agnelli made us orphans and weak, it was easy to attack Juve and destroy them by making things up." According to Moggi, "Juventus bothered because they won too much", noting that then-CONI president Gianni Petrucci declared that "a team that wins too much is harmful to their sport." In an interview with La Repubblica, Giuliano Tavaroli stated to have "saved Montezemolo" and stalked Moggi on Tronchetti Provera's orders, implicating Inter Milan, to which Moggi said was the reason why he had used Swiss SIM cards.) Il processo illecito and Juventus il processo farsa: inchiesta verità su Calciopoli took a critical look at the case, citing several inaccuracies, inconsistencies, and still unclear aspects; several observers, including some supporters of the trials, said there were inconsistencies and there remains some unclear aspects, for instance how the 2015 final ruling, as commented by Giovanni Capuano for Panorama, "further reduce[d] the perimeter of Moggi's cupola, the system that led to the sports verdict of the summer of 2006: could the [sports] directors (Moggi and Giraudo), [the referee designators] Pairetto, Mazzini, and only [the referees] De Santis with Racalbuto be enough?" Moggi's legal defence commented: "This trial starts with about fifty suspects including referees and [referee] assistants plus the leaders of the [Italian Football] Federation, today this mega criminal association is reduced to two referees and three matches. Once all the skimmings have been made, [with] the referees and [their] assistants acquitted, Moggi would have done all sports fraud alone. He would sit down and say, 'I will change the match score in the morning.'" Some of Italian media's reaction and behavior, including sensationalism, was also subjected to criticism. (Note: Milan-based La Gazzetta dello Sport in particular was subjected to criticism, and some critics questioned how, and its legality, the newspaper, among others, anticipated the investigation by the Naples public prosecutor's office, which led to Calciopoli, and the court's rulings, and how some newspapers, such as La Gazzetta dello Sport and la Repubblica, did not report some events that in their view either contradicted the prosecution's theories or were, whether explicitly or not, in the anti-Juventus and colpevolisti camps. An example is that the referee grids were not fixed as the prosecution alleged. The Court of Appeal upheld the request, which was accepted by the first-instance judgment, by referee designators Bergamo and Pairetto of defamation against the newspapers Il Rigore and La Stampa, claiming that the referee grid of Roma–Juventus was fixed; the court ruled that the referee grids were not fixed.)

== Reactions ==
During the sports trial in July 2006, some political forces, such as Forza Italia and Popolari UDEUR, tried to promote the idea of an amnesty, as it was done after the 1980 Totonero scandal for the 1982 FIFA World Cup, in the event of the victory of Italy national football team at the 2006 FIFA World Cup, which ended up occurring. Giovanna Melandri, then-Minister of Youth Policies and Sport from the Democrats of the Left, firmly rejected the amnesty hypothesis, calling it "an idiocy".

Francesco Cossiga, former President of Italy and Prime Minister of Italy, criticized the scandal's effect on individuals, such as then-Juventus player Gianluca Pessotto allegedly attempting suicide, and compared it to the Mani pulite scandal's aftermath. Cossiga also expressed strong words and criticism for the FIGC's Federal Court of Appeal. Silvio Berlusconi, former Prime Minister of Italy and then-Milan owner and president, rejected an amnesty but added: "Any sanctions must not hit the players, many of whom, among other things, have just shown on the pitch that they are the best in the world, and don't deserve to go to [Serie] B or [Serie] C. And then the fans, who have no responsibility." About the trial, Berlusconi stated: "This is a trial without the indispensable characteristics of certainty, which any trial should have, for at least three reasons. First: not all the telephone calls from the judges were heard. Second: not all the witnesses were heard. Third: the reality of the pitch has highlighted situations different from those that should have occurred. They all seem to me sufficient reasons to affirm that there is no guarantee of reaching conclusions based on the facts, by the judges." About relegations, of which all involved clubs at that time were sanctioned for, Berlusconi said: "I'm against every club's relegations and I don't speak as the president of Milan. I'm against it because relegating a club like Juventus would also damage the interests of third parties. In fact, how many clubs without any fault of their own would be forced to give up the proceeds of a match against Juventus? And then we must also think about the damage that is created to sponsors and television companies that had already signed onerous contracts." With only Juventus relegated, the 2006–07 Serie B championship had better TV ratings than the 2006–07 Serie A championship. Juventus' matches were the most watched, the stadiums had better revenues, and were sold-out whenever Juventus played.

In December 2007, before its own club was found in the 2011 Palazzi report to have violated both Article 1 and Article 6, Berlusconi stated: "Calciopoli was all a hoax, did you understand it or not? Some clubs had influence and claimed it, and we have lost a few scudetti." In response, Gavino Angius, then-senator from the Democratic Left and a Roma supporter, commented: "A hoax? I doubt that Siena and Empoli had the strength to plot against Milan. Berlusconi should speak out and call into question the Nerazzurri cousins [Inter Milan] because they are those who he should be referring to." Maurizio Paniz, then-deputy from Forza Italia and president of the Juventus Club of Montecitorio, rejoiced: "I agree. Calciopoli was a frame with which Italy got hurt in front of the world. And Juve as a club, players, fans, and shareholders had unduly paid."

=== Sporting trial ===
Writing for Il Foglio, Christian Rocca stated: "For a week, Italians have had media proof that Juventus is buying referees. But this 'proof' comes from a request for dismissal which, on the contrary and without any doubt, proves how Juventus didn't buy the referees." Italian magistrate Marcello Maddalena justified the dismissal because it is "an investigation undoubtedly destined to last for years and to fill the pages of newspapers and radio and television broadcasts forever, but for the start of which, it is repeated, it hasn't remained at the state (after all the investigations that have been carried out), not even a shred of 'news' that allows it." About Juventus' punishment, Rocca wrote: "In a normal country there would have been a public apology to Juventus and only, I repeat only, a severe ethical and disciplinary judgment against the designator of the referees and the director of a sports club caught having too close relations. Rome and Naples [trials] concern something else, as far as we know: the management of players, not referees."

Writing for Il Tirreno, Enzo Biagi stated: "[This was a] crazy ruling, and not because football is a clean environment. A crazy ruling because it's built on nothing, on wiretaps that are difficult to interpret and can't be proposed in a [trial] procedure worthy of the name, a crazy sentence because it punishes those who were guilty only of living in a certain environment, all seasoned with a process that was a re-edition of the Holy Inquisition in a modern key." Biagi wondered whether Moggi has been identified as "the villain to be fed to the populace" amid numerous other scandals in the country at that time, including the SISMI-Telecom scandal. Biagi's words would be later revoked due to the Calciopoli bis developments. Among others, former Milan and Italy national football team coach Arrigo Sacchi opined that Moggi was a scapegoat for "an environment with connivance and collusion", and of a sporting culture that "did not allow us to know how to lose." About the court's rulings, Sacchi stated: "We had three judicial bodies and all three expressed themselves in a different way from the other: either the first sentence was wrong, or the second or the third."

Corrado De Biase, the head of the investigation office at the time of the 1980 Totonero betting scandal, stated: "First of all, we must have the courage to affirm a reality: this summer's procedure gave birth to an authentic legal abort. When I speak of 'legal abort' I take full responsibility for what I say. When you want to complete a procedure in two weeks that would take at least 6 months just for a correct investigative process, it can only result in a legal abort. When, for reasons of time, a degree of judgment is received, when the defendants are prevented from bringing witnesses, dossiers and films in their defence, but only 15 minutes are allowed for a defence, one can only speak of legal abort. When the defence lawyers of the accused are not granted the full texts of the wiretaps, alleging that they are not pertinent, we can only speak of legal abort. Finally, when a title is disassigned to a club, Juventus, to assign it to another, Inter Milan, before the verdict of the first preliminary iter is pronounced, then we are well beyond legal abort. It's not a problem of ordinary or sporting justice: in any country that defines itself as civil, any penalties and sanctions must be imposed after a guilty verdict has been recorded, never before. And don't talk to me about UEFA regulations or lists to be given to the same for the European cups: the rights of the accused, including that of being able to defend themselves with the means that the law makes available to them, come before a football match." About punishments, De Biase stated: "I, on my own, can only reiterate the concept already expressed: a penalty of 8/10 points, a fine, and a ban of Moggi and Giraudo for 10/12 months, this was the appropriate penalty in my opinion. Any parallel with the story of 1980 is unthinkable: here there're no traces of offence, nor of money or checks. The environmental offence isn't a crime covered by any code, unless we're talking about air pollution."

Citing numerous quotes, Emanuele Boffi for Tempi wondered whether the real scandal was the way it was told, and how through "[p]ages and pages of poison reports" the defendants "Moggi & co were already convicted before the sentences." Boffi wrote that "the Turin Public Prosecutor's Office, which had first viewed all the wiretaps, had dismissed the case as 'the accusatory hypotheses are without confirmation' and for 'the absence of any useful information on any corruption.' Marcello Maddalena, prosecutor of the Turin Republic, also reiterates this in a letter to the newspaper La Repubblica, which the day before had accused him of 'investigative shyness.' Maddalena writes that no evidence emerged from the interceptions that would confirm the original investigative hypothesis (corruption of a public official) for which they had been authorized.' And on the other hand, as Borrelli declares, on the day of the interrogations of the referees, 'there're no pentiti' (June 8). But the culprits were already there."

As recounted by Boffi, magistrates Antonio Di Pietro and Nello Rossi had "some professional qualms about reading verbal or wiretapping all the holy days, maybe even the right and left justicialists should ask some questions." Il Corriere della Sera reported: "We're facing a demonization. Ours is a country of civil guarantees. For now we only know the press reports, however, emphasized with this system of advertising wiretapping, a barbaric system. The laws on the violation of the secret of investigation never find condemnation for those who have violated them. We thought that wiretapping was a prerogative of the fascist regime and instead, obviously, this isn't the case." Article 114 of the Code of Criminal Procedure stated that "the publication, even partial or summarized, by means of the press or other means of dissemination, of the documents covered by secrecy or even their content alone is prohibited." Former Italy national football team coach Giovanni Trapattoni stated: "Anyone who is indignant is a hypocrite, speaking of a dome is an exaggeration." In writing about the press' comparisons to Mafia and criminal association, Boffi stated that it was "[a] system ... meticulously tried in the press and somewhat hastily in the courtroom", quoting the defendant Massimo De Santis as saying: "In seven thousand pages there's no trace of a phone call from me with Moggi. I was judged in the newspapers and on TV. I got to know the developments of the investigations by going to newsstands."

La Repubblica, which took a colpevolisti stance, expressed some doubts. The paper reported: "No witnesses were admitted to the trial. Even the worst of criminals has the right to a testimony in favour. The sprint start of the public prosecutor Palazzi was a rash step. The approach of the trial is singular. Strange that no one asks questions ... , we go into little on the merits. The speed is understandable, but in the 1980s [Italian football betting scandal] and in many other cases the judging committees went late at night." De Biase stated: "I have only read detached sentences in the newspapers, I don't think I have read about a sporting offence to alter the result. I don't seem to have seen matches bought or sold. When I hear from Commissioner Rossi that he will do everything himself and that can come to judgment even without questioning, there is something that does not add up." Lawyer Gaetano Scalise commented: "The special commissioner of the FIGC has given us only three days to study thousands and thousands of papers and present briefs. Do you understand what I'm talking about?" About one wiretap in which Giraudo stated of a referee that "if he's smart, he halves Udinese", De Santis commented: "'I enjoyed downloading the call times from the internet. And if you check them too, you will understand everything.' Was the phone call after the offending match? 'That's right.'" About Francesco Saverio Borrelli, journalist Giorgio Bocca stated: "The appointment of Borrelli to direct the investigation into the great football scandal is the litmus test, the chemical reagent, the proof of truth, the fall of lies, the naked king of the Berlusconi people who 'don't give up', who don't tolerate returns to justice, who conceive democracy only as an alliance of the strongest and richest clans."

=== Naples trial and Supreme Court ===
Upon hearing one new wiretap and other wiretaps implicating Inter Milan, journalist Elio Corno stated: "Only for this phone call [referring to a 26 November 2004 wiretap between Carraro, former president of the FIGC, and Bergamo, former referee designator, who was asked to not favour Juventus against Inter Milan], (Note: The call between Bergamo and Rodomonti, the match's referee, was transcribed as follows: Bergamo: "Don't forget Pasquale because you struggled to get there, to go back and therefore, I expect, believe me, that you won't miss anything, nothing, for anyone." Rodomonti: "I'm immensely pleased with what you said because it's the truth." Bergamo: "Above all, there's a difference between the teams of 15 points, understood, so also prepare well psychologically. You mustn't question the efforts you've endured, so reff your match, there's none for anyone, so if I tell you mine right now if you have a doubt think more about who is behind rather than who is in front." Rodomonti: "All right, all right." Bergamo: "Listen to me, it's something that remains between you and me." Rodomonti: "On my word. Thank you, don't worry." Bergamo: "Because getting up there you know how tiring it is, going back down—it would be really stupid for you." Rodomont: "All right." Bergamo: "Be an intelligent person. It stays between you and me, I hope." Rodomonti: "Don't worry." This call led observers to wonder whether Carraro made these recommendations to Bergamo because he knew that Juventus was being helped and was aware of the criminal association to would steer the championship as argued by the prosecution, or it was because he was aware of the different media reactions that occurred following a mistake in favour of Juventus. In his deposition, Carraro argued that it was the latter, saying: "Because for the media, in general, of the time, written press, radio, television ... in general public opinion, Juventus was a 'very powerful' club, [while] Inter [Milan] was considered, at that time, less authoritative in terms of sports politics, for which an error in favour of Inter [Milan] was considered an error, an error in favor of Juventus would have led to a reaction of public opinion." He was concerned about the imminent elections to determine the Lega Calcio president; Milan's Galliani, who was the favorite and who received opposition in the past, was eventually elected. The match ended 2–2 but it was not without controversy; in two wiretaps after the match, referees Collina and Rosetti agreed that Inter Milan was favoured when its goalkeeper Francesco Toldo received a yellow rather than red card. In 2020, Carraro stated that the only thing he blamed himself for Calciopoli was not having substituted Bergamo and Pairetto earlier with Collina, and reiterated that Juventus would still have won had the scandal not happened because it was the best team.) the Calciopoli trial had to be annulled, it had to be immediately annulled." In another TV broadcast, Corno stated: "May we say, with great honesty, that this Calciopoli sporting trial was a farce?" Journalist Giuseppe Cruciani stated: "I'm not a Juventus fan. I sympathize with the Bianconeri from 2006 onwards because I believe that what happened to Juventus with Calciopoli was a great injustice and I'm on the side of those who are against injustices." Journalist Oliviero Beha saw Moggi as a scapegoat; in 2011, he wrote that "Moggi, branded as the Al Capone of football, served perfectly as a stopper for a bottle of bad liqueur for public drunkenness, ending up in a trap." In November 2021, Italy's Supreme Court confirmed the sentence against RAI to compensate the relatives of Beha, who had died in 2017, with €180,000 for having subjected him to demotion between 2008 and 2010 due to his critical positions on the Calciopoli trials.

During the Naples trial in 2010, lawyer Flavia Tortorella of the Italian Footballers' Association, said: "Rather than asking myself why it happened, I would ask myself questions about what will happen in the future, when the investigation of the fact in criminal proceedings arrives. Calciopoli, at least legally speaking, was this: the sporting trial had to be managed in a different way, in the sense that the proceedings had to necessarily wait for the investigation of the fact in a criminal case, first of all because the sporting legislation at that historical moment was not ripe for contain a case of this kind. The legislation, the Sports Justice Code, which is the current one with some changes that have occurred from 2006 to today, was by no means a code that could contain a sporting proceeding of that magnitude and provide for sanctions regulations for that type of offence, and in fact they invented, so to speak, the structured offence because for the types of offence codified and typified within the code of sporting justice absolutely could neither be initiated nor terminated in that way a procedure of that type." In an interview with Tuttosport, lawyer Paolo Rodella stated: "Compared to the summer of 2006, new facts are emerging. Wanting to be flexible, we can even think of a revision on the basis of the interceptions presented in Naples. They clearly constitute elements that, if they were already known by the sports justice bodies, they would have influenced the sentence, which would have been of a different nature, at least on the plurality of the subjects sanctioned."

After the Naples trial, Carlo Rossini reported that "Juventus has been acquitted, the offending championships (2004/2005 and 2005/2006) have been declared regular, and the reasons for the conviction of Luciano Moggi are vague; mostly, they condemn his position, that he was in a position to commit a crime. In short, be careful to enter a shop without surveillance because even if you don't steal, you would have had the opportunity. And go on to explain to your friends that you're honest people after the morbid and pro-sales campaign of the newspapers." Rossini criticized some in the media, writing that "a club has been acquitted, and no one has heard of it, and whoever has heard of it, they don't accept it. The verdict of 2006, made in a hurry, was acceptable, that of Naples was not. The problem then lies not so much in vulgar journalism as in readers who accept the truths that are convenient. Juventus was, rightly or wrongly, the best justification for the failures of others, and it was in popular sentiment, as evidenced by the new controversies concerning 'The System.' But how? Wasn't the rotten erased?" About the latter, Rossini said that, according to Moratti, referees have been wrong in good faith since 2006, and stated that "it isn't a question of tifo, but of a critical spirit, of the desire to deepen and not be satisfied with the headlines (as did Oliviero Beha, a well-known Viola [Fiorentina] fan, who, however, drew conclusions outside the chorus because, despite enjoying it as a tifoso, he suffered as a journalist. He wasn't satisfied and went into depth. He was one of the few)."

In 2015, journalist Giuliano Vaciago wrote: "The first instance ruling of Casoria and the famous Palazzi report (the one in which the public prosecutor of the FIGC considers Inter Milan liable to sporting offences in light of the new interceptions) would be enough to appear in front of the FIGC and reopen the 2006 folders. There's no need to reopen the sentences of the Supreme Court to rewrite history, just read well the first instance one and listen to the trial that produced it. And nothing remains of the sporting trial." In response to former Juventus' player Alessandro Del Piero, who dubbed Calciopoli as "[a] bit crazy and unusual, strange from many points of view", journalist and Juventus supporter Marcello Chirico stated that "Del Piero is right to be amazed again, even 14 years later. Something anomalous happened that summer, and the anomaly was also perpetrated in the years to come with the ordinary process and subsequent appeals. The most compromising phone calls with the [referee] designators (authorized by the system of the time, it's always good to remember) were made by other clubs, and not by Juve. It's all documented. However, Juventus was sent to Serie B all the same and someone else, who explicitly asked to be able to win a match and pilot the referee draw, received a scudetto as a gift. All this is also documented through very explicit phone call records." Journalist Roberto Renga, who was also active as a journalist during the Totonero scandal in the 1980s, sees Calciopoli as an injustice, in regards to Juventus' treatment. In 2018, he commented: "As you know, I'm not a Juventus fan, but I'm a football fan, of teams that work and do well. And I get attached to those who have suffered abuse."

=== Defendants and referees ===
Moggi always declared himself innocent, and in his appeals to the European courts stated that "if they give me a pardon, I renounce it. Pardon is for those who are guilty, I'm not guilty [of the 'criminal association' charge], I didn't do anything [criminal]. They weren't angry at me, they were angry at Juventus because it won too much." About those who said his declarations of innocence were based on the view that everyone was guilty, he clarified: "I have never said that everyone is guilty and therefore there is no one to blame. There is a practice, you have to ban Carraro when he says in wiretaps that you have to save Fiorentina and Lazio." About his actions, Moggi stated that they were criticizable, and he was wrong from an ethical standpoint but did not commit any illicit; (Note: As was widely acknowledged at the time, having relations with referee designators was not only not prohibited but was actively encouraged by FIGC higher-ups, such as then-FIGC president Carraro, to keep good relations among all, and avoid controversies and disputes, and everyone felt it was not perceived as illegal; notable was the Christmas dinner between the FIGC, club executives, and referees. The rules were made harsher only after the scandal, including the addition of the much-disputed associative illicit for which Juventus would be relegated even without any Article 6 (relegation) violation, and make it illegal to have such relations again. In addition, even giving gifts to referees was not explicitly prohibited; notably, Roma gave golden Rolexes as gifts to referees. Moggi was alleged to give referees Maseratis through Fiat Chrysler Automobiles, which is owned by the Agnelli family through Exor; this claim was later proved to be untrue and dismissed by Turin magistrate Marcello Maddalena; Inter Milan and Milan's gifts, such as Rolexes, tickets, and merchandising, were found to be true and damaging. Other implicated clubs included Bari, Genoa, Empoli, Lazio, Perugia, Siena, and Torino. It became a scandal when it was known about the gifts of Roma, which at that time had won the 2001 championship to Juventus' disadvantage, and referees were offered gifts, such as gastronomic specialities, by Lazio president at a time when the club was first and eventually won the 2000 championship, again to Juventus' disadvantage in the final match. Moggi did not directly spoke to referees, only Inter Milan's Facchetti and Milan's Mean did so, such as with De Santis and Puglisi.) Moggi said that "[t]he sports court, at the end of the trial, ruled as follows: 'Regular championship, no match altered.' Therefore Juventus [is] exempt from crimes referred to in Art. 6. The final ruling of the ordinary justice instead spoke of 'early consummation' crimes, which are nothing more than the fruit of hypotheses and inferences of that prosecutor who in the courtroom had asserted 'there were no other phone calls, if not those of the suspects in the trial', while the [Italian Football] Federation Prosecutor asserted that 'Inter Milan was the club that risked most of all for the illegal behavior of its President Facchetti." About the Swiss sim cards, Moggi stated that he used them to circumvent "those [such as Inter Milan and Inter Milan's Telecom] who intercepted us", with reference to transfer operations. He commented: "We had bought Stanković and we also had the contract ready to be presented to the [Italian Football] Federation. After two months the player and his agent disappeared, we found them at Inter Milan." About the wiretaps, Moggi said that he never intruded on the designation of referees, and spoke of incomplete wiretaps for the prosecution. Moggi also reiterated that "[t]hey accused me of going to the referees' locker room but that's not true; others did. Paparesta's kidnapping never happened, it was just a joke." In 2014, Agnelli stated: "Moggi represents a beautiful and important part of our history. We are the country of Catholicism and forgiveness. We can also forgive people, can't we?" Moggi responded: "Nice words. I thank Andrea Agnelli, but I don't need forgiveness. If anything, I deserve praise for [the 16 trophies won on the pitch for the club]. ... There were twenty clubs and they behaved in the same way but only Juve paid because it bothered."

The defendants implicated with Moggi were stunned by the charges and conviction of criminal association. Of the alleged seven-consecutive falsified championship, they mentioned that Juventus controversially lost out two, both of which were consecutively won for the first time in Italian football history by two Southern clubs (the first by Lazio in 2000 during the Jubilee in the Catholic Church, and the second by Roma during the Passaportopoli scandal, which did not involve Juventus, upset that rules were changed and not respected), and only won another championship (that of 5 May 2002) due to what was called "Inter Milan's [football] suicide". Bergamo, one of the referee designators implicated, stated: "But I talked to everyone, that's what [then-FIGC president] Carraro wanted. And I dined with everyone: with the late Franco Sensi, with Tanzi and Sacchi, with Spalletti, Spinelli, [and] Aliberti. Then I invite home Facchetti, Galliani, and those of Juve, when the championship is now over but only with the Bianconeri do I find myself at home surrounded by the Carabinieri, the photo stalking, [and] the wiretapping. Yet the invitation to Facchetti and Galliani I did by phone! Nothing, nothing comes back to me in this investigation and its shortcomings; my wife used the Swiss [phone] card. With Nucini's fabrication of history: he meets Moggi, he becomes a partner, and we no longer put him in Serie A. There was no [criminal] affiliation: he was [simply] mediocre!" Like fellow referees Pierluigi Collina and Roberto Rosetti, Paolo Tagliavento stated to have never received any pressure, and testified: "I was never pressured by the [referee] designator or De Santis. For a referee it's easier to reff a derby than being in a courtroom, I'm not at ease here."

Former referee and defendant De Santis, convicted of criminal association as a simple associate with Moggi, was also upset by the rulings, and feel that Italian football is no better today than it was at that time. De Santis recalled that he was called a juventino for disallowing Fabio Cannavaro's regular goal in a Juventus–Parma match of the 1999–00 Serie A that was won by the former 1–0, (Note: Some observers said that the championship was lost to Juventus' disadvantage, as the subsequent clamour for alleged decisions in favour of Juventus resulted in the club being disadvantaged in the next match, which suspended for over an hour and not postponed, losing the championship. In addition, some analysts stated that Cannavaro's disallowed goal was the result of a non-existent corner kick, and some critics, such as Ju29ro, described the Juventus–Parma aftermath as "the first stone of [what would become] Calciopoli" for its clamour against Juventus. De Santis himself stated that he had doubts about assigning the corner kick to Parma, and commented that "I, as a referee in Rome, should not have been designated in that match, as someone from Turin should not have done for Lazio." Cannavaro recalled: "So many controversies surrounding that match. The referee [just] made a mistake and it can happen. They remain really exciting challenges.") for which he made mea culpa and stated it was one of many honest, good-faith mistakes in his career, which he realized upon re-watching the events, but that he was never a Juventus supporter, and he was not favoured by Moggi. (Note: De Santis stated that he was an Inter Milan supporter but he stopped to do so for any club when he became a professional referee. About the wiretaps, De Santis said that he never heard from Moggi, but he had many from Inter Milan's Giacinto Facchetti, as well as Milan's Leonardo Meani, stating: "I often spoke with Facchetti and Meani. I had a very good relationship with Giacinto Facchetti, and I must say that in many circumstances he was very obsessive. His requests sometimes went even beyond the lawful. But I never took them into consideration because when I went out on the pitch I only thought about managing the matches correctly. Moratti knows these things very well. I'm sorry to talk about a person who unfortunately is no longer here, but I'm very willing to make my phone records public, so that everyone knows these reports were real. I felt very often with [Meani] too and I have to smile when he is treated like a delivery boy or a caregiver." About former Inter Milan owner Moratti, who ordered from Telecom a dossier on him, De Santis said: "Just one thing: why didn't he tell me what he thought of me to my face? He came to the locker room many times, before or after the matches, he could have calmly told me that he thought I was in Juve's pockets. But no, on the contrary, it seemed he respected me." De Santis also stated that there was a prejudice towards him, and he did not help Juventus but, on the contrary, disadvantaged them by making them lose points; De Santis was the referee of the 2005 Supercoppa Italiana between Juventus and Inter Milan, which was won by the latter 1–0 in extratime, after Juventus' David Trezeguet scored a regular goal not allowed due to a non-existent offside. On the origins of Calciopoli, De Santis stated: "I think it originated in an area that sees Inter Milan, Pirelli, and Telecom connected." Like then-Inter Milan player Christian Vieri, De Santis accused Inter Milan of harassment and spying on him, and sued Inter Milan asking €21 million in damage, which was rejected in 2013. De Santis commented: "It's a sentence that took me by surprise. We brought so many statements as sources of evidence and it was clear to everyone that there had been an illegal activity of espionage. I'm curious to understand what this decision is due to, I wait [for] the motivations. If stalking a person and his family and checking the telephone records is lawful, then I wonder what is lawful or not in Italy." In 2015, the Supreme Court confirmed what was established by the court of first instance in civil proceedings because the documents stated that they were in the name of Pirelli.) De Santis felt that he was the sole referee to pay, as he was the only convicted referee, and stated: "The 2004–2005 championship was regular. The sentences are clear: no match [was] altered. All the referees were acquitted. The only three matches that ended up as 'fixed' have never been tried but only theorized. There were flaws that neither the Court of Appeal nor that of Cassation wanted to discover, [only] following the initial theory [of Moggi's criminal association] instead of seeking the truth. I have never had any [Swiss SIM], I have proved it in the documentation presented to the trials. Am I the only referee who has not freed myself from the shoals of the prosecution? At first, I was seen as a promoter of the association, then only as a simple associate. It was necessary to ascertain the truth, not to frame people in a theorem that is the child of the Pirelli files."

About Berlusconi, Moggi said: "I thanked him and I thank him for his esteem for me, maybe I reserve him a criticism for what he didn't do to the Calciopoli explosion: he knew that innocent people would be penalized, obviously for him too it was a priority to demolish Juventus' domain." Moggi also said that Berlusconi wanted him at Milan, and during a private meeting to discuss the matter revealed to him that "the FIGC possessed some of [Moggi's] wiretaps without any criminal value, of which Galliani (then-vice-president of Milan and president of Lega Calcio), Carraro (then-president of the FIGC), [and] General Pappa, head of the investigations office of the FIGC, were also aware." Moggi stated that those same wiretaps were made public just a few days after. Moggi had earlier said that Galliani made Calciopoli come out because Berlusconi wanted him at Milan. In regard to the dispute between the FIGC and Juventus, Moggi responded to then-FIGC president Carlo Tavecchio: "From the trials, it turns out that there has been no alteration of the championship, there has been no alteration of the referee grids, even 30 referees were acquitted of the charges. I've helped some of these acquitted referees, I've helped many financially. Poor boys, I felt sorry for them, they didn't know how to pay the lawyer. They were ruined by Calciopoli." About the Supreme Court's sentence, Moggi reiterated his innocence of the criminal association charge, and added: "The Supreme Court speaks of power. But power isn't a crime. I had power because I worked well, it was power because of the quality of the work [as general director] I did." Apart from Milan, Moggi stated that he was also sought by Inter Milan. Citing Gianni Agnelli's quote that "the king's groom must have known all the horse thieves", Moggi discussed how "Agnelli said that because during my time it was full of sons of bitches. And he wanted an expert, one who could stand up to these here. For me it's a compliment."

In 2017, Moggi said that "VAR was supposed to be the end of the controversy, [but] nothing has changed. Calciopoli would have broken out anyway. Five referees were acquitted, Racalbuto had the statute of limitation, and only De Santis was convicted; as the rulings say, the matches and the leagues have not been altered. What happened on the pitch was just a pretext used to take out those who at that moment had the most skills and obtained the most successes." When Agnelli, among others, was investigated by the public prosecutor's office of Turin on the management of tickets at the Juventus Stadium about the alleged infiltration of the 'Ndrangheta in the commercial management of the club's tickets, Moggi stated: "For those who know Andrea, it's an accusation that would make people laugh rather than cry, [which was] bounced on all the newspapers despite the denials of the Federal Prosecutor, Giuseppe Pecoraro. Juve is again under attack from those who can't beat them on the pitch. What happened in 2006 wasn't enough." By March 2020, both Moggi and Giraudo appealed to the European Court of Human Rights for the conduct of the trials and the few time given to legal defences; Giraudo's appeal was accepted in September 2021, and he is being represented by Amedeo Rosboch, the same lawyer who defended Jean-Marc Bosman in the revolutionary Bosman ruling in association football.

== FIGC–Inter Milan–Juventus controversy ==
=== Inter Milan and Juventus ===
Before later developments and investigation implicated Inter Milan, among other clubs, Inter Milan felt vindicated by the trial's first phase, as in their view that was the reason why the club did not win in Italy, having at that time most recently won the 1988–89 Serie A championship. Upon being assigned the 2006 scudetto, Inter Milan and their supporters called it scudetto degli onesti ("scudetto of the honests"). With Juventus' relegation, Inter Milan boasted of becoming the only Serie A club to have never been relegated. (Note: Prior to Calciopoli, Inter Milan and Juventus were the only two Serie A clubs to have never been relegated. The 1912–13 Prima Categoria was the first Italian championship to include promotion and relegation, as Southern clubs were admitted for the first time; Juventus finished last in the Piedmont group but the FIGC annulled Juventus's relegation, deciding for the 1913–14 Prima Categoria that "two places in Lombardy are [to be] occupied by two teams from the Ligurian–Piedmontese nation, and precisely by Novara and Juventus." The 1921–22 Prima Divisione, which was organized by the Italian Football Confederation in diatribe with the FIGC, Inter Milan finished last in the Lega Nord group but was saved by winning two playoff matches; Inter Milan won the first match against Nazionale Lombardia due to forfait, and the second one against Fiorentina Libertas after winning the first leg 3–0 and drawing the second leg 1–1.) Then-Inter Milan owner Massimo Moratti would later state that he did not disdain the 2006 scudetto, as he thought it was just; of the five consecutive championship won by Inter Milan between 2006 and 2010, Moratti stated that the 2006 title was "the most beautiful", and he was proud of it. In response to Moratti's statements, Juventus president Andrea Agnelli stated: "It must be recognized he has a great love for Inter Milan, a great love that led him to accept some follies such as accepting a scudetto that he didn't win." In spite of the diatribe, when expressing satisfaction at the 2015 Supreme Court ruling, Moratti also stated that he was always friend with Agnelli. Despite more cordiality outside football between the Agnelli family and the Moratti family, relations remain damaged by Calciopoli, and the football rivalry increased. Dating back to the 1960s, it represented the battle of oil manufacturer Pirelli and automobile manufacturer FIAT, Milan versus Turin as the battle of the Italian triangle industrial north, and an intra-capitalist conflict. Calciopoli only strengthened the rivalry, and the Derby d'Italia became even bigger than Milan's Derby della Madonnina, or the Juventus–Milan rivalry in the 1990s and early 2000s. In 2013, Moratti was succeeded as president by Indonesian businessman Erick Thohir, to whom he sold all his stakes. Relations did not improve, as Juventus continued to appeal and ask for the revision of the proceedings, all the while former Inter Milan board of director and then-FIGC president Carlo Tavecchio's declared sympathy for Inter Milan surfaced, amid photos with Inter Milan's executives and future Chinese ownership. Relations between the two clubs only improved in 2018, as Zhang Kangyang, the son of new Chinese owner Zhang Jindong through the Suning Holdings Group, became Inter Milan president. In 2021, Juventus and Inter Milan were two of three Italian clubs (the other was Milan) to take part to the European Super League project.

Some Inter Milan players, such as Julio Cruz, Ronaldo, and long-time captain Javier Zanetti, felt vindicated by the rulings but said that Juventus was among the best teams. Alvaro Recoba and Christian Vieri (former Juventus player) were one of the few Inter Milan players who did not feel the 2006 scudetto as theirs, stating that Juventus was the better team, and the 2006 scudetto belonged to Juventus. In a 2012 interview, Recoba stated: "For my part, I think that Juventus won that scudetto because they had great players and ... [w]hen it turned out that the scudetto was awarded to Inter Milan, I thought the players didn't feel it was theirs." Then-Juventus captain Alessandro Del Piero, who testified that "referee De Santis didn't penalize Ibra[himovic] but was later disqualified with the TV proof for a foul on Cordoba and missed the championship match with Milan", and there was general agreement to play the contested Lecce–Juventus match, stated to have won 17 titles, not 15. He commented: "All the scudetti won since I have played football have been deserved, be it those of our club or others. At the time, Juve was a very strong team built to win." In 2019, Fabio Capello, Juventus coach from 2004 to 2006, stated: "It seems right to me [that Juventus appealed to the 2006 decision], it's funny that it was assigned to Inter Milan, which finished third and was also under investigation. Guido Rossi decided very hastily because we needed a team that would play in the Champions League. It was unfair, the rules weren't respected, and sports justice couldn't investigate thoroughly."

About the scandal and subsequent trials, Agnelli said: "In 2006, the problem was equal treatment. In a circle of twenty clubs there was a way of behaving that emerged from the proceedings, but now the Juventus fan thinks he was the only one to pay because the others did the same things. And those [like Inter Milan] who have behaved in the same way can't go out with a scudetto in their pocket. We can't forget about all this. In Naples there're two criminal proceedings that are coming to an end, then there will be other degrees of judgment, but the court papers give an idea of what happened. When the whole process is completed, we will make a decision. Certainly, however, it makes no sense to speak of a statute of limitation if new facts emerge in the meantime." In 2018, Giovanni Cobolli Gigli, who became Juventus president after the scandal, stated that Inter Milan "deserved to be punished" for Calciopoli, and expressed regrets for the sporting trials, about which he said: "We were demoted to play the 2006–07 season in Serie B and accepted the ruling. The regret remains for a sporting trial that was, in my view, not conducted in the best way. Certain pieces of evidence were ignored, actually it's more accurate to say hidden, and the existence of other telephone wiretaps regarding different clubs wasn't made known at the time. Inter [Milan] too deserved to be punished for what emerged in the various conversations. The FIGC Prosecutor Palazzi said so. It all emerged when the matter missed the statute of limitations and it ended like that."

The diatribe between Moratti and Moggi never ended, and continues to this day. In 2020, Moratti said: "Everything served to create the conditions to triumph, even the misadventures due to having to face a Juve who behaved as they did and fight against a wall that seemed unshakable. Then we managed to break through it, and thus find those satisfactions in which I had always believed but which at a certain point seemed impossible." Moggi recalled a sentence of the Court of Appeal stating that Inter Milan's Facchetti lobbied with the referees, and Palazzi, the federal prosecutor of the time, wrote that Inter Milan was the club that risked most of all, Moggi adding: "Moratti has lost another opportunity to shut up. He could celebrate in another way, and maybe those who asked him could ask him if one ruling counts more than another or if the law is really the same for everyone." Appealing to the code, Moggi stated: "Inter Milan was liable for Article 6, which is a sporting offence, Juventus was never liable for Article 6. It's good to remind the gentleman because nobody ever speaks for Juventus, so I do it. There're wiretaps in which Facchetti and Moratti ask a referee to let them win the match, I have never done these things."

=== Juventus' appeals and damage claims ===
After Calciopoli bis implicated almost every Serie A club and the Court of Appeal confirmed the extraneousness of Juventus, the club asked the two championships back in 2011 and sued the FIGC over €443 million in damage claims, updated to €581 million by 2016, due to being unable to participate UEFA competitions, major money loss from TV rights, as the club was relegated to Serie B, and had to sell major players at cheap prices. Observers, such as Fulvio Bianchi, said that at that time "Juventus was ... stronger than all those that came after, and had €250 million in revenue, being at the top of Europe, and 100 sponsors. It took ten years to recover and return to the top Italians, not yet Europeans: now the club makes over €300 million, but in the meantime Real, Bayern, and the others have taken off."

In 2015, Carlo Tavecchio, a former Inter Milan's board of director member for four years and former FIGC president from 2014 to 2017, admitted, "as a good, old interista", that "Juventus was clearly the strongest team on the pitch, they won 32 championships: the team didn't steal anything." He expressed frustration at the club's repeated appeals and damage claims to the FIGC, which he described as absurd, and added that "Juve's cause is reckless and, you will see, the FIGC will ask for damages." Tavecchio, who in later years stated to be in good relations with Agnelli and Juventus despite the multimillion-dollar lawsuit, offered to discuss reinstatement of the lost scudetti, as well as reforms in Italian football, in exchange for Juventus dropping the lawsuit. The diatribe between the FIGC and Juventus intensified when Juventus won the club's first championship since the scandal, and continued to add, on both its website and stadium, the two championships from 2005 and 2006 during the club's record streak of nine-consecutive league titles; this caused some skirmishes between the FIGC and Juventus when Italy football team had to play at the Juventus Stadium, and the club's number of scudetti had to be covered. About the incident, Tavecchio stated that "the Calciopoli ruling, which sanctioned the club's behavior off the pitch, is law and we are here to enforce it."

== In popular culture ==
The vicissitudes of Calciopoli have found ample space in the national and international mass media, influencing the popular imagination and acting as the subject for various types of audiovisual productions. In summer 2006, comedian Checco Zalone released the song "Siamo una squadra fortissimi" ("We are a very strong team"), a tribute to the Italy national team in the FIFA World Cup in Germany. In the same year, Zalone recorded the song "I juventini" about Juventus' relegation to Serie B. In 2009, the documentary film Operation Off Side was released about the investigations by the Carabinieri between 2004 and 2005, while the documentary Nel paese di Giralaruota: il grande inganno di Calciopoli and the comic series Forza Italia recount the various part of the scandal. In 2013, the Rai 3 criminological program Un giorno in pretura showed the depositions provided by prosecution witnesses in the Naples criminal trial and explored the various strands of the investigations that then led to the proceedings. In 2021, a chapter of the Netflix series Il lato oscuro dello sport is focused on the Calciopoli investigation from the prosecutor's side. The following year, the documentary Calciopoli – Anatomia di un processo, where the stages of the investigations and the criminal trial in Naples are recalled, was available through Italy's History channel from the prosecutor's side and focused in the sporting trials.

The scandal was instrumental in coining and popularize several neologisms, such as Farsopoli (by critics of the trials), scudetto degli onesti (by Inter Milan supporters upon being assigned the 2006 scudetto), (Note: Also known as scudetto della correttezza ("scudetto of correctness"), it was coined by Inter Milan owner Massimo Moratti in July 2006.) scudetto di cartone (by critics of the title's assignment to Inter Milan), Rubentus, and prescritti. The former was coined by supporters of the trials in reference to Juventus' involvement in the scandal, while the latter is used by critics of the trials in reference to Inter Milan's involvement in the scandal, and the club's other scandals resulting, like Calciopoli and accounting fraud investigations, in the statute of limitation. Antijuventino and antijuventinità, terms used to describe Juventus' hatred, which intensified during those years, were also popularized. (Note: While both terms date back as early as 1975, they have been widely used during and after the scandal to criticize the trials, described as one-sided against Juventus, which was punished through sentimento popolare ("i gobbi ["the Hunchbacks, Juventus' nickname most accredited dating back to the 1950s] cheat, everyone knows it") what some observers described as "to transform a series of unproven allegations of unsportsmanlike offences into an elusive structural sporting offence".) Both of those terms are included in Treccani's website as neologisms; in addition, the period after Calciopoli is termed post-Calciopoli.

== See also ==
- SISMI-Telecom scandal
- Tangentopoli

== Bibliography ==
=== English ===
==== 2000s ====
- "Buffon cleared of illegal gambling". ABC. 30 December 2006.
- Burke, Jason (30 July 2006). "Paradiso to inferno". The Observer.
- Burke, Jason (30 July 2006). "Paradiso to inferno (part two)". The Observer.
- Casula, Andrea (9 May 2007). "Looking 'Inter' Calciopoli – A Juve Fan Wants Justice". Goal.com. Archived from the original on 12 May 2007.
- Eve, James (27 June 2006). "Italy's elite prepare defences ahead of tribunal". Reuters.
- "Former Juventus chief gets jailtime: Report". Associated Press. 14 December 2009 – via CBC.
- Gladwell, Ben (24 March 2015). "Calciopoli Italian match-scandal case expires after nine-year investigation". ESPN.
- Hooper, John (15 July 2006). "Juventus hit rock bottom as Italy's cheats are relegated". The Guardian.
- "Inter assigned the 2005/2006 league season title". FIGC. 26 July 2006. Archived from the original on 27 August 2007.
- "Italian Giants Stunned by Match-fixing Punishments". Deutsche Welle. 15 July 2006.
- "Italians withdraw World Cup ref". BBC. 13 May 2006. Archived from the original on 3 January 2007.
- "Italian trio relegated to Serie B". BBC. 14 July 2006. Archived from the original on 14 July 2006.
- "Italy's football chief resigns". World Soccer. 9 May 2006.
- "Italy prosecutor wants Reggina relegated". Reuters. 13 August 2006. Archived from the original on 16 August 2006 – via The Guardian.
- "Juve formally withdraws TAR appeal". ANSA. 1 September 2006.
- "Juventus fined again". RTÉ Sport. 18 June 2008. Archived from the original on 15 July 2011.
- "Juventus to appeal sentence despite FIFA threats". ESPN FC. 24 August 2006. Archived from the original on 29 October 2006.
- Kock, Jesper; Sparre, Kirsten (26 May 2006). "TV host felled for his part in Juventus scandal". Play the Game.
- Kuper, Simon (7 July 2006). "Azzurri's quest consoles nation rocked by scandals". Financial Times. Archived from the original on 15 July 2006.
- Lawton, James (27 January 2007). "Fallen gods of Calcio". The Independent.
- "Lippi meets Juve probe magistrates". CNN. 19 May 2006.
- "Minnows face Calciopoli probe". Channel 4. 20 July 2006. Archived from the original on 21 July 2006.
- Nieddu, Gavino (6 May 2006), "Wiretap: Where's The Balanced Reporting?", Goal.com.
- O'Brien, Jonathan (16 July 2006). "The Italian Job". The Sunday Business Post. Archived from the original on 24 June 2008.
- "Punishments cut for Italian clubs". BBC. 25 July 2006. Archived from the original on 22 August 2006.
- "Reggina suffer 15-point deduction". BBC. 17 August 2006.
- "Reggina to stay in Serie A". Reuters. 18 August 2006. Archived from the original on 20 August 2006 – via The World Game.
- "Serie A quartet will stand trial". BBC. 23 June 2006.
- Sparre, Kirsten (26 May 2006). "Disgraced Italian soccer president can still work for FIFA". Play the Game. Danish Institute for Sports Studies.
- Warren, Dan (14 July 2006). "Italian football's tangled web". BBC.

==== 2010s ====
- Al-Hendy, Mohamed (4 June 2012). "Italy's Match-Fixing Scandal: 5 Things You Need to Know". Bleacher Report.
- Allen, Richard (19 July 2011). "Inter Milan declared 2006 Serie A champions". Stuff.
- Assem, Ahmed (24 March 2015). "Moggi cleared of two counts of sporting fraud in final Calciopoli verdict". Forza Italia Football. Archived from the original on 2 April 2015.
- Basu, Rangan (30 October 2015). "Calciopoli 2006: The match-fixing scandal that got Juventus relegated". Sportskeeda.
- "'Borse e orologi Adidas dal Milan, cachemire dall'Inter', Ceniccola inchioda le milanesi! Ma anche Nucini ('Ero la 'talpa' dell'Inter nel sistema-Moggi') e De Santis dicono tutto..." Goal.com (in Italian). 12 January 2011.
- Bufi, Fulvio (24 March 2015). "Supreme Court Acquits Moggi, Giraudo and Referees". Corriere della Sera (in Italian). Translated by Watson, Giles. Archived from the original on 27 March 2015.
- "Calciopoli: Del Piero 'I won 17 titles, all deserved'". Calciomercato.com. 19 October 2010.
- "Calciopoli: 10 luoghi comuni che 10 anni fa suonavano così bene". Calciomercato.com (in Italian). 23 April 2016.
- Campanale, Susy (17 December 2013). "Moggi Calciopoli sentence cut". Football Italia.
- Campanale, Susy (11 May 2018). "Cobolli Gigli: 'Inter in Calciopoli Too'". Football Italia.
- Campanale, Susy (12 June 2021). "Moggi: 'Calciopoli is not over'". Football Italia.
- Garganese, Carlo (17 June 2011). "Revealed: The Calciopoli evidence that shows Luciano Moggi is the victim of a witch-hunt". Goal.com.
- Hafez, Shamoon (5 October 2019). "Calciopoli: The scandal that rocked Italy". BBC.
- "Juventus €444m lawsuit rejected". Football Italia. 6 September 2016.
- "Juventus have Calciopoli appeal rejected". Football Italia. 13 December 2018.
- "Juventus in new Calciopoli appeal". Football Italia. 12 January 2019. Archived from the original on 23 January 2021.
- "Juventus reveal star-less shirts". Football Italia. 11 July 2012.
- Landolina, Salvatore (10 October 2010). "Calciopoli Watch: Del Piero On Revoked Scudetti; Tagliavento Insists No Pressure On Referees". Goal.com (in Italian).
- Mahoney, Tony (31 March 2015). "Tavecchio tells Juventus: Drop €443m lawsuit and we will talk about your two Scudetti". Goal.com.
- "Moggi ban confirmed". Football Italia. 16 March 2017.
- "Moggi had unjustified and excessive power reveals court". Gazzetta World. 9 September 2015. Archived from the original on 9 October 2015.
- "No Moggi Calciopoli absolution". Football Italia. 23 March 2015.
- Piccioni, Valerio (1 January 2011). "Calciopoli, si parla di regali, 'Milan e Inter più della Juve'". La Gazzetta dello Sport (in Italian).
- Piccioni, Valerio (5 December 2012). "Calciopoli: Giraudo condannato" [Calciopoli: Giraudo convicted]. La Gazzetta dello Sport (in Italian).
- "Stalemate sees Juventus become first team in Serie A history to win four doubles in a row". The 42. 13 May 2018.
- "Tavecchio: 'Calciopoli crimes were real'". Football Italia. 25 March 2015.
- Tigani, Frank (19 January 2010). "Calciopoli: Who Was Really Responsible?". Bleacher Report.
- Tigani, Frank (2 April 2011). "Calciopoli: Another Look at Who Might Have Really Been Responsible". Bleacher Report.
- Voakes, Kris (7 May 2012). "The end of a long, dark road: A timeline of Juventus' recovery from Calciopoli relegation to Serie A champions". Goal.com. Archived from the original on 9 May 2012.
- West, Aaron (15 July 2016). "10 years on: Juventus' relegation from Serie A, the Calciopoli scandal, and the redemption". Fox Sports.

==== 2020s ====
- Berkbeck, Tim (11 January 2021). "The aftermath of Calciopoli: Redemption in Turin". Football Pink.
- Erözden, Can (29 July 2020). "Juventus owns Italy, winning 9 straight league titles in row". Anadolu Agency.
- "Former Juventus director appeals ban to European Court". Associated Press. 23 March 2020 – via Sportsnet.
- Gastelium, Andrew (2 May 2021). "Inter Milan Wins Serie A Title, Breaking Juventus's Nine-Year Run". Sports Illustrated.
- Ingram, Sam (20 June 2021). "Calciopoli Scandal: Referee Designators As Desired Pawns". Zico Ball.
- Jabbar, Nashir (3 May 2021). "Antonio Conte Started Juventus' Serie A Dominance And Ended It With Inter Milan". SPORTbible.
- "What happened next? The Juventus stars who left after relegation to Serie B in 2006". Squawka. 7 January 2021.

=== Italian ===
==== 2000s ====
- "Accuse Juve: griglie, sorteggi e designazioni pilotate". Ju29ro.com (in Italian). 10 October 2006.
- Anelli, Diego (4 August 2007). "Luciano Moggi: 'Calciopoli? Un regolamento di conti'". La Stampa (in Italian) – via TuttoMercatoWeb.com.
- "Appello: Juve in B a meno 17 Milan, Fiorentina e Lazio in A". La Gazzetta dello Sport (in Italian). 25 July 2006.
- "Arbitri, De Santis e Rosetti mondiali". La Repubblica (in Italian). 1 April 2006.
- "A Sinistra l'Amnistia Diventa 'Idiozia'". Corriere della Sera (in Italian). 8 July 2006. Archived from the original on 23 May 2022.
- "Berlusconi: 'Calciopoli? Tutta una montatura' La politica si divide. Anche per tifoserie". La Repubblica (in Italian). 17 December 2007.
- Bianchi, Fulvio (12 April 2004). "Fuorigioco e rigori, bufera sul calcio. I designatori: 'Accuse assurde'". La Repubblica (in Italian).
- Biasin, Fabrizio (14 December 2006), "Lo studio statistico", Libero (in Italian).
- "Blatter incastra Montezemolo". Ju29ro.com (in Italian). 22 December 2007.
- Bocci, Alessandro (1 September 2006). "La Juve ritira il ricorso al Tar". Corriere della Sera (in Italian).
- Boffi, Emanuele (29 July 2006). "Calciopoli. E se lo scandalo fosse il modo con cui ce l'hanno raccontato?". Tempi (in Italian).
- Bogo, Fabio (21 July 2007). "Giuliano Tavaroli e lo scandalo Telecom-Sismi: 'in Italia un network eversivo, mentono tutti'". Blogo (in Italian). Archived from the original on 31 May 2022.
- Buccheri, Gugglielmo (10 January 2009). "Assolti in aula? Per lo sport restano colpevoli". La Stampa (in Italian). Archived from the original on 16 April 2009.
- "Calciopoli, Blatter all'ANSA: Montezemelo bravo mediatore". La Repubblica (in Italian). 22 December 2007.
- "Calcio: spettatori allo stadio +6,8%, Juve campione audience". La Repubblica (in Italian). 10 June 2009. Archived from the original on 25 June 2021.
- "Calciopoli, tutte le telefonate: così Moggi gestiva il potere". La Repubblica (in Italian). 26 April 2007.
- Capasso, Stefano (7 February 2012). "Motivazioni sentenza Calciopoli: 'Il campionato 2004/2005 è stato regolare'". Calcio Blog (in Italian). Archived from the original on 25 January 2023.
- "Capello: 'Altro che scudetto degli onesti... Il titolo alla Roma? Sarebbe troppo bello'". La Repubblica (in Italian). 21 June 2007.
- "Capello: 'La Juve paga Calciopoli, il ciclo dell'Inter ha quel vizio di origine'". La Repubblica (in Italian). 22 May 2009 – via Goal.com.
- Carotenuto, Angelo (18 December 2007). "Ecco come lo squalificato Moggi continuava a guidare il calcio". La Repubblica (in Italian).
- "Collina allo scoperto: 'Tifo per la Lazio'". Corriere della Sera (in Italian). 11 November 2005.
- "Collina lascia il fischietto: 'Mi dimetto'". Corriere della Sera (in Italian). 8 August 2005.
- "'Consigli' agli arbitri e minacce, le telefonate dei potenti del calcio". La Repubblica (in Italian). 12 May 2006.
- "Cossiga: 'Calciopoli? Fa solo danni'". La Gazzetta dello Sport (in Italian). 1 July 2006.
- Damascelli, Tony (3 December 2009). "Moratti&Agnelli, parenti, soci, soprattutto nemici". Il Giornale (in Italian).
- D'Avanzo, Giuseppe (21 July 2008). "'E Tronchetti mi disse: Le abbiamo chiesto troppo'". La Repubblica (in Italian).
- "De Santis in tv, la testimonianza di un nostro utente". Calciomercato.com (in Italian). 1 May 2007. Archived from the original on 3 May 2007.
- "De Santis: 'Mai sentito Moggi in vita mia'". Corriere della Sera (in Italian). 21 June 2006.
- Di Santo, Giampiero (27 April 2007). "Calciopoli, la Cupola era una bufala". Italia Oggi (in Italian).
- "Disciplinare: chiusi i procedimenti per Juventus, Messina e Paparesta" (in Italian). FIGC. 18 June 2008. Archived from the original on 28 January 2016.
- "E Moggi, dopo Reggina-Juventus sequestrò Paparesta e i guardalinee". La Repubblica (in Italian). 12 May 2006.
- "'Eravamo da C, chiesta la B'". La Gazzetta dello Sport (in Italian). 26 October 2006.
- "'Faccio questa scelta nell'interesse del calcio'". La Repubblica (in Italian). 8 May 2006.
- "Giudice di pace assolve Moggi: Non c'è stato illecito sportivo". Tuttosport (in Italian). 10 June 2009. Archived from the original on 13 June 2009.
- "I bianconeri fanno il botto a 90° minuto". Tuttosport (in Italian). 22 January 2007.
- "Indagini illegali, 'Panorama': Tavaroli proteggeva Montezemolo" (in Italian). ANSA. 8 November 2007.
- "I libri di controinformazione sulla Juve". Ju29ro.com (in Italian). 7 November 2007.
- "Il sorteggio arbitrale non era truccato". Ju29ro.com (in Italian). 29 September 2007.
- Imparato, Ilario (13 July 2006). "Berlusconi su Calciopoli: 'Ingiusto penalizzare i tifosi con la B'". TuttoMercatoWeb.com (in Italian).
- "Intercettazioni, Carraro si dimette 'Mai violato regole, ma ora c'è emergenza'". La Repubblica (in Italian). 8 May 2006.
- "Io do una cosa a te, tu ne dai una a me?". Ju29ro.com (in Italian). 14 November 2008.
- "I pm hanno scoperto la cupola usando i sistemi anticamorra". Il Giornale (in Italian). 18 April 2007.
- "Juve-Inter, storia di una rivalità". Tuttosport (in Italian). 22 September 2008. Archived from the original on 30 September 2009.
- "Juve, momento difficile" (in Italian). Eurosport. 12 February 2007.
- "La Gazzetta dello Sport: minchia che rridere". Ju29ro.com (in Italian). 13 January 2009.
- "La Juve, 'squadra gloriosi'", La Gazzetta dello Sport (in Italian), 10 October 2006.
- "La Pro Vercelli: 'Quando l'Inter ci scippò lo scudetto'". Goal.com. 15 April 2009.
- "Le 19 partite di A sotto inchiesta". La Gazzetta dello Sport (in Italian). 15 May 2006.
- "L'inno per gli azzurri nato da Zelig". La Gazzetta dello Sport (in Italian). 7 July 2006.
- Loffredo, Ermenegildo (22 November 2009). "Calciopoli: Controesame Zeman". Giù le mani dalla Juve (in Italian).
- "Lo strano connubio Telecom-Sismi". La Stampa (in Italian). 22 September 2006.
- Malpica, Massimo (16 April 2007). "Moggi e le sim segrete su 107 partite". Il Giornale (in Italian).
- Mauro, Alberto (31 August 2006). "La Juve rinuncia al ricorso Tar". La Gazzetta dello Sport (in Italian).
- Meloni, Francesco (26 June 2006). "Mondiali 2006: Rosetti da record, dirigerà per la quarta volta" (in Italian). FIGC.
- Mensurati, Marco (27 April 2007). "Calciopoli, schede svizzere è caccia al dirigente". La Repubblica (in Italian).
- Mensurati, Marco (19 December 2007). "Quell'arbitro nella stanza 404: 'Prendila, è la sim card segreta'". La Repubblica (in Italian).
- "Moggi, addio al calcio 'Mi hanno ucciso l'anima'". La Repubblica (in Italian). 14 May 2006.
- "Moggi: 'La cupola? C'è ancora'". Corriere della Sera (in Italian). 5 August 2007.
- "Montezemolo: 'Tronchetti Provera è parte lesa nel caso Telecom'". Il Sole 24 Ore (in Italian). 9 February 2007.
- Monti, Fabio (10 July 2002). "Divisi alla meta: Galliani presidente della Lega, Matarrese vice". Corriere della Sera (in Italian). Archived from the original on 29 October 2010.
- Monti, Fabio (11 July 2002). "'Galliani in Lega? Meglio il commissario'". Corriere della Sera (in Italian). Archived from the original on 29 October 2010.
- "Moratti: 'Scudetto: siamo fieri". La Gazzetta dello Sport (in Italian). 27 July 2006.
- Moretti, Alvaro (10 January 2009). "Sandulli: 'La sentenza Gea ha smontato l'accusa'". Tuttosport (in Italian). Archived from the original on 6 November 2013.
- Olivaro, Stefano (12 November 2009). "Perché non si parla di Carraro". Indiscreto (in Italian).
- Pelucchi, Roberto; Vernazza, Sebastiano (27 June 2006). "Moggi e i pm, ecco i verbali". La Gazzetta dello Sport (in Italian).
- Perotto, Paolo (20 May 2006). "Calciopoli: le spiegazioni di un agente FIFA". Corriere della Sera (in Italian).
- "Processo a Calciopoli, il verdetto non assolve". La Repubblica (in Italian). 31 October 2008.
- Ripani, Alessia (16 May 2006). "Moggi-Padrino o come Tom Cruise, gli sfottò impazzano su internet". La Repubblica (in Italian).
- Rocca, Christian (9 May 2006). "L'incredibile caso Moggi". Il Foglio (in Italian). Archived from the original on 18 September 2007.
- "Sandulli: 'Il campionato era regolare'". Corriere della Sera (in Italian). 27 July 2006.
- Sannucci, Corrado (15 May 2003). "Juve e Milan, la sfida infinita storia di rivalità e di campioni". La Repubblica (in Italian).
- "Sempre alta la stima di Moggi per Moratti: 'E' la faccia di un c..., Marcello!'. Ma anche Lippi... 'Mancini ha bisogno di una bella lezione!'". Goal.com (in Italian). 20 April 2007. Archived from the original on 1 May 2007.
- Sgambati, Stefano (20 July 2007). "Uno studio ha contato i torti arbitrali dell'ultimo campionato". Sport News (in Italian). Archived from the original on 8 August 2007.
- Sorrentino, Andrea (13 May 2005). "Zola-Martins, tutto in un minuto ma il Cagliari contesta l' arbitro". La Repubblica (in Italian).
- "Testo della decisione relativa al Comm. Uff. N. 1/C – Riunione del 29 giugno / 3 - 4 - 5 - 6 - 7 luglio 2006" (PDF) (in Italian). Federal Appeals Commission. 14 July 2006 – via Ju29ro / La Gazzetta dello Sport.
- "Telecom sponsor Ferrari". Il Giornale (in Italian). 18 May 2006.
- "Tifosi della Juve scatenati sul web: 'Mourinho uno di noi'". Sky Sport (in Italian). 22 January 2009.
- "Tutte le motivazioni". La Gazzetta dello Sport (in Italian). 10 October 2006.
- "'Uno Scudetto in segreteria, l'altro perché soli...': Mou ammette, è tutto vero!". Goal.com (in Italian). 2 April 2009.
- Zunnino, Corrado (27 July 2006). "Salvati perché la gente voleva così". La Repubblica (in Italian).
- Zunino, Corrado (25 April 2007). "Le intercettazioni di Calciopoli. Dal vivo il sistema Moggi". La Repubblica (in Italian).

==== 2010s ====
- Abbate, Aniello (11 May 2010). "Live Calciopoli – Ancelotti: 'Perugia-Juve? Accadde un fatto strano'". TuttoMercatoWeb.com (in Italian).
- Abruzzese, Stefano (8 October 2013). "Speciale Calciopoli: G+I /1, la 'dottrina Meani'". Ju29ro.com (in Italian).
- "Agnelli saluta Thohir con una battuta: 'La capitale dell'Indonesia? Jakartone'. E chi vuol capire all'Inter..." Goal.com (in Italian). 16 October 2013.
- Agresti, Stefano (23 April 2016). "Calciopoli 10 anni dopo: non è stata Farsopoli, ma qualcosa non torna". Calciomercato.com (in Italian).
- Agresti, Stefano (12 May 2017). "Auguri Zeman, juventino anti-Juve: 70 anni di bel calcio, coraggio e spaccature". Calciomercato.com (in Italian).
- "Aigner su Calciopoli: 'Milan e Juve colpevoli. L'Inter e le altre solo vittime'". Jmania (in Italian). 15 April 2010.
- "All'Inter lo Scudetto 2006; Moratti 'Caso chiuso'; Juve 'Palmares non si prescrive'". Calciomercato.com (in Italian). 1 July 2011.
- "Altro che riapertura, per Sandulli siamo davanti a Calciopoli-bis: 'Con queste intercettazioni avremmo punito anche l'Inter all'epoca". Goal.com. 7 April 2010.
- "Anche i migliori sbagliano. Travaglio gravemente impreciso su Calciopoli". Sconfini (in Italian). July 2011.
- "Anche lo juventino Travaglio assolve l'Inter ('Non esistono illeciti'), ma sullo scudetto 2006 non è morbido: 'Va restituito'". Goal.com (in Italian). 11 April 2010.
- "Ancora intercettazioni, Collina si complimenta con Meani: 'Ora sei potente!". Goal.com. 7 April 2010.
- Arpino, Felix (29 May 2018), "Calciopoli: l'illecito sportivo della Juventus", Il calcio è uguale per tutti (in Italian).
- Arpino, Felix (29 January 2018), "Calciopoli: l'imputazione che non c'è", Il calcio è uguale per tutti (in Italian).
- Arpino, Felix (9 March 2019), "La posizione processuale di Paolo Bergamo", Il calcio è uguale per tutti (in Italian).
- Arpino, Felix (22 March 2019), "Calciopoli: il mancato risarcimento a Gazzoni", Il calcio è uguale per tutti (in Italian).
- Arpino, Felix (26 April 2019), "Calciopoli: la radiazione di Moggi, Giraudo e Mazzini", Il calcio è uguale per tutti (in Italian).
- Bassi, Alessandro (7 April 2017). "1910, quando l'Inter vinse il suo primo titolo, contro i ragazzini di 11 anni". Calciomercato.com (in Italian).
- Bassi, Alessandro (28 April 2018). "1913 e 1922, Juventus e Inter in Serie B? Ecco come andò veramente". Calciomercato.com (in Italian).
- Beccantini, Roberto (2 June 2010). "Non proprio il Massimo, quel trio..." La Stampa (in Italian).
- Beha, Oliviero (12 April 2011). "Beha: 'L'ombra della prescrizione su Calciopoli'". Il Fatto Quotidiano (in Italian).
- Beha, Oliviero (10 November 2011). "Calciopoli, Oliviero Beha 'A Napoli con il machete'". Il Fatto Quotidiano (in Italian). Archived from the original on 11 November 2011.
- Beha, Oliviero (10 November 2011), "Chi ha ancora paura di Moggi?", Oliviero Beha (in Italian).
- Beha, Oliviero (11 November 2011). "La presa (per i fondelli) di Calciopoli: tutto ridotto al tifo per Inter e Juventus, con il concorso dei media". Tiscali (in Italian). Archived from the original on 13 November 2011.
- Beha, Oliviero (7 February 2012). "Il 'caso Moggi' e le colpe della stampa: non fa inchieste, (di)pende dai verbali, non sa leggere le sentenze". Tiscali (in Italian). Archived from the original on 12 March 2012.
- Bertacchini, Thomas (3 April 2010). "Lo aveva detto anche Ezio Biagi..." TuttoMercatoWeb.com (in Italian).
- Bertagna, Sabine (14 June 2012). "'Calciopoli, la vera storia': il libro di Narducci. Travaglio: agli smemorati". Calciomercato.com (in Italian).
- Bianchi, Stefano (1 July 2015). "Scudetti bianconeri: 33 o 35?". Giù le mani dalla Juve (in Italian).
- Buccheri, Guglielmo (7 June 2012). "'Fu Moratti il mandante del dossier De Santis'". La Stampa (in Italian).
- "Calciopoli". Treccani (in Italian). 18 March 2011.
- "Calciopoli, altre intercettazioni. In una telefonata Bergamo si 'scopre' super-tifoso del Milan". Goal.com. 6 April 2010.
- "Calciopoli, anche il legale bianconero è possibilista: 'Se ci sono novità e la Juve me lo chiede, riapriamo il processo'". Goal.com. 6 April 2010.
- "Calciopoli/Audio: intercettazioni sull'Inter: Bergamo, Facchetti, Bertini. Leggi il testo integrale". Il Sussidario (in Italian). 29 May 2010.
- "Calciopoli, Capello: 'Una comica lo scudetto del 2006 all'Inter'". La Repubblica (in Italian). 14 January 2019.
- "Calciopoli, Cassazione: 'Moggi? Strapotere su Figc e tv'". La Gazzetta dello Sport (in Italian). 9 September 2015.
- "Calciopoli, clamorosa intercettazione! Racalbuto: 'Nel dubbio contro la Juventus'". Goal.com (in Italian). 16 December 2013.
- "Calciopoli, De Santis: 'Facchetti mi chiamava come gli altri'". La Stampa (in Italian). 30 March 2015.
- "Calciopoli, durissimo colpo all'accusa e all'Inter da parte dell'avvocato di Racalbuto". TuttoMercatoWeb.com (in Italian). 20 September 2011.
- "Calciopoli, De Santis è incredulo: 'Io unico arbitro condannato, voglio capire'". Goal.com. 24 March 2015.
- "Calciopoli in Cassazione ma il 2006 è già smontato". Ju29ro.com (in Italian). 23 January 2015.
- "Calciopoli, la Cassazione: l'Inter non spiò De Santis". Tuttosport (in Italian). 5 September 2015.
- "Calciopoli: la squalifica di Moggi I regali, dai prosciutti ai Rolex". La Repubblica (in Italian). 14 April 2010.
- "Calciopoli, l'ex arbitro De Santis: 'Tifavo Inter'". Calciomercato.com (in Italian). 19 December 2015.
- "Calciopoli, l'ex procuratore federale Porceddu: 'Assegnare lo scudetto all'Inter fu un errore gravissimo'". L'Unione Sarda (in Italian). 17 February 2017.
- "Calciopoli, Moggi: 'Atti criticabili, mai illeciti'. E sulle schede coinvolge l'Inter". La Gazzetta dello Sport (in Italian). 3 December 2013.
- "Calciopoli, Moggi condannato a Napoli: 5 anni e 4 mesi, associazione a delinquere". Corriere della Sera (in Italian). 8 November 2011.
- "Calciopoli: Moggi vs Facchetti e Thohir". Calciomercato.com (in Italian). 6 November 2014. Archived from the original on 24 December 2014.
- "Calciopoli, Moratti: 'I tifosi della Juventus accettino la sentenza'". Corriere dello Sport (in Italian). 13 December 2018.
- "Calciopoli, nuova intercettazione Racalbuto–Meani: nel dubbio sfavorire la Juventus". Jmania (in Italian). 16 December 2013.
- "Calciopoli, parla Porceddu: 'Che errore assegnare titolo 2006 all'Inter, ma Rossi coi suoi amici...'". Goal.com (in Italian). 18 February 2017.
- "Calciopoli, parla un saggio: 'Con elementi nuovi...'". La Gazzetta dello Sport (in Italian). 7 April 2010.
- "Calciopoli: per il 70% degli italiani la Juventus è capro espiatorio", Mediaset (in Italian), September 2010
- "Calciopoli, PM: Moggi con SIM segrete per parlare di arbitri". La Repubblica (in Italian). 10 May 2011.
- "Calciopoli, Roberto Beccantini 'Un altro complotto? No Grazie'". Il Fatto Quotidiano. 10 November 2011. Archived from the original on 3 November 2012.
- Cambiaghi, Emilio; Dent, Arthur (2007). Il processo illecito (PDF) (1st ed.). Stampa Indipendente – via Ju29ro, 15 April 2010.
- Capuano, Giovanni (17 March 2015). "Calciopoli, ricorso al Tar e dialogo possibile tra Juventus e Tavecchio". Panorama (in Italian).
- Capuano, Giovanni (17 March 2015). "La memoria ritardata di Carraro: 'Campionato '98 falsato'. Quando era nº1 di Lega..." Panorama (in Italian).
- Capuano, Giovanni (24 March 2015). "La prescrizione cancella Calciopoli. Juve, Moggi e scudetti: cosa succede adesso?". Panorama (in Italian).
- Capuano, Giovanni (10 September 2015). "La Cassazione e l'assist a Tavecchio: ora la Figc attende il ritiro della causa". Panorama (in Italian).
- Caracciolo, Nino (2 November 2017). "Calciopoli, verità clamorosa di Carraro: 'scudetto a tavolino all'Inter e Guido Rossi, dico questo'". Sport Fair (in Italian).
- Caracciolo, Nino (8 December 2017). "Moggi shock: 'Ecco perché l'Inter meritava la retrocessione in Serie B. Il rigore Ronaldo-Iuliano? Ecco la verità su Calciopoli'". Sport Fair (in Italian).
- "'Caro Silvio, grazie di tutto anche se potevi salvarmi'". La Gazzetta dello Sport (in Italian). 15 April 2017.
- "Caso Kroll, Tronchetti rinuncia alla prescrizione". Il Sole 24 Ore (in Italian). 18 April 2015.
- "Ceccarini: 'Episodio Ronaldo-Iuliano? Non era rigore'". La Repubblica (in Italian). 6 April 2018.
- Chies, Carlo (May 2012). "La grande storia del calcio italiano". Guerin Sportivo (in Italian). pp. 24–33.
- Cicconfri, Paola (19 June 2012). "La Repubblica della mistificazione". Giù le mani dalla Juve (in Italian).
- Cingolani, Stefano (21 August 2017). "Guido Rossi, borghese di lotta e di governo che criticava la finanza. Sguazzandoci". Il Foglio (in Italian).
- "Ci risiamo: Il giudice Sandulli (tifoso della Lazio) che condannò Luciano Moggi e la Juventus in Calciopoli, accusa il Toro di slealtà sportiva". L'Arena del Calcio (in Italian). 31 March 2021.
- "Cobolli Gigli, l'ex presidente della Juventus chiarisce: 'Non patteggiammo per Calciopoli, da vigliacchi'". Goal.com (in Italian). 25 February 2019.
- "Come doveva andare per essere Calciopoli". Ju29ro (in Italian). 15 September 2010.
- "Comunicato ufficiale N. 96/CDN (2010/2011)" (PDF) (in Italian). FIGC. 15 June 2011. Archived from the original (PDF) on 15 September 2011.
- "Corte Figc: 'Moggi è radiato' 'Si dovrebbero vergognare'". La Gazzetta dello Sport (in Italian). 28 April 2010.
- Corsa, Antonio (28 February 2011). "Calciopoli. Tutti gli uomini di Leonardo Meani". AntonioCosta.it (in Italian).
- Corsa, Antonio (31 October 2010). "Calciopoli. Le telefonate del Milan/1 – La nona di ritorno". AntonioCosta.it (in Italian).
- Corsa, Antonio (9 November 2010). "Calciopoli. Le telefonate del Milan/2 – La morte del Santo Papa". AntonioCosta.it (in Italian).
- Corsa, Antonio (15 November 2010). "Calciopoli. Le telefonate ignorate di Galliani". AntonioCosta.it (in Italian).
- Corsa, Antonio (15 April 2010). "Calciopoli. Meani e la designazione di Puglisi (art. 6 sparato)". AntonioCosta.it (in Italian).
- Corsa, Antonio (10 April 2010). "Il cassetto mai aperto di Collina". AntonioCosta.it (in Italian).
- "Cruz: 'Calciopoli pagina scura del calcio italiano. Tanti pensavano che c'era qualcosa che non andava...'". TuttoMercatoWeb.com (in Italian). 19 March 2021.
- "Da Calciopoli a Ribaltopoli? 'Il processo è un imbroglio'". Sky Sport (in Italian). 27 September 2011.
- De Felice, Alessandro (6 July 2011). "Travaglio: 'Abissale differenza tra Moggi e Facchetti. Prescrizione? rinunci la Juve'". La Gazzetta dello Sport (in Italian).
- "De Santis: 'Anche Moratti da me negli spogliatoi'". QN Quotidiano Nazionale (in Italian). 12 October 2011.
- "De Santis chiede 21 milioni a Moratti". La Stampa (in Italian). 11 October 2011.
- "De Santis: 'Farsa Calciopoli, Moggi mi odiava, c'è dentro mezza A'". Calciomercato.com (in Italian). 5 March 2012.
- "De Santis: 'Ho fatto perdere la Juve; Moratti? Non si può certo lamentare'". Calciomercato.com (in Italian). 23 April 2013.
- "De Santis insiste: 'Calciopoli nata per colpire Moggi, ma lui non mi voleva'". Goal.com. 9 April 2016.
- "Dichiarato inammissibile il ricorso della Juventus per lo scudetto 2005-2006" (in Italian). CONI. 6 May 2019.
- Discreti, Stefano (26 April 2010). "Moggi: 'Juve in B per colpa di Montezemolo. Balotelli? Datelo a me'". TuttoMercatoWeb.com (in Italian).
- "Dossier illegali, parla Tavaroli: 'Io e Tronchetti, ecco la verità'". La Repubblica (in Italian). 5 June 2010.
- D'Ottavi, Marco (4 October 2019). "Storia orale del contatto tra Ronaldo e Iuliano". L'Ultimo Uomo (in Italian). Sky Sport Italia.
- "Ecco perchè la Juve è stata assolta a Napoli dalla responsabilità per l'operato di Moggi: Lucianone aveva agito per favorire Lazio e Fiorentina. Ma in appello..." Goal.com (in Italian). 16 November 2011.
- "Elkann, Zaccone, Montezemolo: spiegate". Ju29ro (in Italian). 7 April 2010. Archived from the original on 10 December 2022.
- "E ora Moggi getta ombre su Collina". Il Tirreno (in Italian). 22 April 2011.
- "Esce la biografia di Luciano Moggi, ecco alcuni segreti". TuttoMercatoWeb.com (in Italian). 8 May 2014.
- Fiorito, Giusy (22 December 2010). "GLMDJ – La calciopoli rossonera/1, il 2006". TuttoMercatoWeb.com (in Italian).
- Fornara, Luca (29 May 2012). "I Campionati vinti dalla Juventus nel 1908 e 1909: la storia e i tabellini completi". Storico 30 (in Italian) – via Juworld.net.
- Galdi, Maurizio; Piccioni, Valerio (12 October 2010). "Il perito: 'Il nome di Collina lo fece Bergamo, non Facchetti'". La Gazzetta dello Sport.
- Garganese, Carlo (5 July 2011). "Inter will almost certainly be stripped of 2006 Scudetto". Goal.com.
- "Gazzetta, non così!". Ju29ro.com (in Italian). 26 November 2010.
- Gentile, Marco (13 December 2018). "Moratti fiero: 'Scudetto del 2006 all'Inter? Ora gli juventini lo accettino'". Il Giornale (in Italian).
- "Gli 80 anni di Luciano Moggi (ma su Calciopoli restano le ombre)". la Repubblica (in Italian). 9 July 2017.
- "Gli italiani e il calcio" (PDF) (in Italian). Demos & Pi. September 2011.
- Giambertone, Francesco (1 July 2015). "Juve, svelate le nuove maglie Adidas: terza stella e seconda divisa rosa". Calcio e Finanza (in Italian).
- Gottero, Federico (2 December 2016). "Calciopoli non finirà mai, Dondarini querela il pm Narducci: ecco il motivo". CalcioWeb (in Italian).
- Gregorace, Francesco (2 April 2014). "Calciopoli – Tifosi juventini contro Cobolli Gigli: se solo non avesse ritirato il ricorso..." CalcioWeb (in Italian).
- Guarnieri, Daniele (7 July 2011). "Sironi: 'Lo scudetto del 2006 dato all'Inter non è più così 'etico'". Tempi (in Italian).
- Iaria, Marco (14 July 2011). "Guido Rossi e quel comunicato estivo". La Gazzetta dello Sport (in Italian).
- "'I cartonati mi danno fastidio', giornalista preso di mira sul we". Virgilio (in Italian). 8 November 2019.
- "Il designatore a Facchetti: 'Va bene l'arbitro Mazzoleni?'". BergamoNews (in Italian). 5 May 2010.
- "'Illecito sportivo dell'Inter', ecco le carte di Palazzi". La Gazzetta dello Sport (in Italian). 4 July 2011.
- "Intercettazione ingombrante: Pronto, parla Galliani". Calciomercato.com (in Italian). 16 November 2010.
- "Intercettazioni Bergamo e Bertini – Facchetti nello spogliatoio dell'arbitro". Juventus News (in Italian). 25 May 2010.
- "I testi della telefonate". La Repubblica (in Italian). 3 April 2010.
- "Inter, Moratti: 'Scudetto più bello? Quello del 2006'". Corriere dello Sport (in Italian). 26 August 2015.
- Iuliano, Raffaella (3 February 2015). "Moratti: 'Andare dagli arbitri prima e dopo la partita era prassi'". Ju29ro.com (in Italian).
- Jacobelli, Xavier (1 July 2011). "Calciopoli: Il peccato originale di Guido Rossi si ritorce contro l'Inter, ora la Figc vuole togliere lo scudetto 2006". Calciomercato.com (in Italian).
- Jacobelli, Xavier (24 March 2015). "Jacobelli: no, Moggi, purtroppo Calciopoli non è stata uno scherzo". Calciomercato.com (in Italian).
- "Ju29ro – La Gazzetta s'inkazza". TuttoMercatoWeb.com (in Italian). 7 July 2010.
- "Juve, arrivano le tre stelle sulla maglia". Blasting News (in Italian). 15 November 2014.
- "Juve–Inter amici mai. Agnelli, Moratti e il potere". Positano News (in Italian). 9 December 2017.
- "Juve-Inter e lo scudetto 2006: la Cassazione chiude il caso. 'L'ha vinto l'Inter'". Sportmediaset (in Italian). 13 December 2018.
- "Juventus, Calciopoli: 45 giorni perché il Tar del Lazio pubblichi la sentenza". Corriere dello Sport (in Italian). 18 July 2016.
- "Juve, Paparesta: 'Chiuso nello spogliatoio da Moggi? Mai successo'". Calciomercato.com (in Italian). 5 January 2018.
- "Juve-Parma '00: la prima pietra di Calciopoli". Ju29ro.com (in Italian). 26 March 2014.
- "Juve, per Moggi è sempre Calciopoli: 'Restituire gli scudetti a chi li ha vinti! Inter? Moratti parlava con Pairetto e...'". Calciomercato.com (in Italian). 3 January 2019.
- "La bomba del TAR e chi l'ha disinnescata". Ju29ro (in Italian). 3 January 2011. Archived from the original on 10 December 2022.
- Zamboni, Alberto (15 October 2011). "La bufala di Paparesta e l'attenzione dell'Alta Corte". Jmania (in Italian).
- "La Confessione, Luciano Moggi su Nove: 'Usavo telefoni esteri per non essere spiato'. Gomez: 'Sentenza dice che erano per gli arbitri'". Il Fatto Quotidiano (in Italian). 1 March 2019.
- "La giustizia sportiva pre e post Calciopoli". Ju29ro (in Italian). 27 August 2010.
- "La grigliata milanista non interessava". Libero Quotidiano (in Italian). 29 February 2012.
- "La Juventus attacca Tuttosport. De Paola risponde". Ju29ro (in Italian). 14 March 2011.
- "La Juventus e la 'terza stella'". Il Post (in Italian). 7 May 2012.
- La Neve, Domenico (19 February 2019). "Cucci: 'Marotta come Moratti, i pessimi rapporti con Andrea Agnelli hanno fatto riesplodere la rivalità Inter–Juve'". Tribuna.com (in Italian).
- "La storia per 'La Gazzetta dello Sport'". Ju29ro.com (in Italian). 24 July 2011.
- "Le nuove intercettazioni con Galliani e Moratti". La Gazzetta dello Sport (in Italian). 15 April 2010.
- "Le nuove intercettazioni con Moratti, Meani e Cellino". La Gazzetta dello Sport (in Italian). 9 April 2010.
- "L'informativa che non c'è". Ju29ro.com (in Italian). 18 September 2010.
- "L'Inter si salva ancora: dopo la prescrizione (su Calciopoli) arriva un altro patteggiamento". Gioco Pulito (in Italian). 27 July 2016.
- Lippi, Gabriele (13 December 2018). "Sullo scudetto del 2006 Juve e Inter sono entrambe in torto". Lettera43 (in Italian).
- Lombardi, Leandro (20 March 2014). "Calciopoli: 'Moggi ha falsato sette campionati'". Blasting News (in Italian).
- "Lo scudetto del 2006? Recoba non lo sente suo, anzi... 'É della Juve'". Goal.com.
- "Luna, l'esperto di Internet che svelò le carte di Calciopoli, sarà il direttore L'Unità". Calcio e Finanza (in Italian). 17 May 2016.
- "Manchester United, caduta di stile: 'La chiamano Rubentus'". Tuttosport (in Italian). 23 October 2018.
- "Manchester United, sul sito la Juventus diventa 'Rubentus' citando Calciopoli". Sportmediaset (in Italian). 23 October 2018.
- Mari, Daniele (8 July 2011). "Avv. Prioreschi: 'Facchetti illecito, Moggi no'. Travaglio: 'Ci prendete per fessi?'". La Gazzetta dello Sport (in Italian).
- Mari, Daniele (10 August 2011). "Agnelli: 'Scudetto degli onesti? No, scudetto dei prescritti'". La Gazzetta dello Sport (in Italian).
- Mastroluca, Alessandro (1 May 2016). "Calciopoli dieci anni dopo: cosa resta dello scandalo?". Fanpage (in Italian).
- Mensurati, Marco (27 March 2015). "La Cupola del calcio secondo Carraro: 'Lo scudetto del '98 falsato per la Juve'". La Repubblica (in Italian).
- "Milan sulla griglia, spunta una telefonata Meani-Bergamo". Sky Sport (in Italian). 3 April 2010.
- Minchiotti, Gianluca (7 September 2016). "Calciopoli deve finire: Thohir, Zhang e Tavecchio invitino Agnelli vicino a loro". Calciomercato.com (in Italian).
- "Moggi a Bari: 'Mancavo dalla famosa Reggina-Juventus del 2006'". Tuttosport (in Italian). 12 May 2015.
- "Moggi ammette: 'Iuliano-Ronaldo, era rigore'. E svela perché non andò all'Inter". Calciomercato.com (in Italian). 8 May 2014.
- "Moggi assolto: fu 'ritorsione' contro Zeman, non diffamazione". Blitz Quotidiano (in Italian). 21 December 2012.
- "Moggi: Gianni e Umberto Agnelli non avrebbero permesso la farsa di Calciopoli". Ju29ro.com (in Italian). 6 July 2013. Archived from the original on 8 February 2023.
- "Moggi: 'Juve sotto attacco di chi non sa batterla. De Laurentiis stia zitto'". Il BiancoNero (in Italian). 10 March 2017.
- "Moggi lancia l'allarme: 'Attenta Juve, come nel 2006 sei sotto attacco mediatico'". SpazioJ (in Italian). 10 March 2017.
- "Moggi rivela: 'Galliani fece scoppiare Calciopoli perché Berlusconi mi voleva al Milan'". Corriere dello Sport (in Italian). 28 April 2016.
- "Moggi: 'Var inutile, l'Inter andava retrocessa'". Virgilio (in Italian). 8 December 2017. Archived from the original on 31 May 2022.
- "Moratti: 'Calciopoli, truffa per l'Inter. Il Fair play finanziario? Con aperture'". La Stampa (in Italian). 24 January 2011.
- "Moratti: 'Scudetto del 2006 tra i miei preferiti. Fu giusto'". Tuttosport (in Italian). 26 August 2015.
- Moretti, Alvaro (30 July 2011). "Tre baffi rossi. Di vergogna". Libero Quotidiano (in Italian).
- "Napoli: Tribunale 5, Moggi 0". Famiglia Cristiana (in Italian). 8 November 2011.
- Nardo, Sandro (1 May 2016), "Calciopoli (o Farsopoli?) dieci anni dopo", WeMadeHi5tory (in Italian).
- "Nel caos-intercettazioni spunta anche il Milan! Meani a Bergamo: 'A Trefoloni fai un bel discorsetto, altrimenti gli tagliamo la testa...'". Goal.com (in Italian). 3 April 2010..
- "Nel paese di Giralaruota: il film su Calciopoli". La Repubblica (in Italian). 4 May 2012.
- Nicolino, Mirko (26 August 2015). "Moratti: 'Giusto assegnare lo scudetto 2006 all'Inter'". Calcio Blog (in Italian).
- Nicolino, Mirko (9 April 2016). "De Santis: 'Calciopoli? Ho pagato solo io, dovevano colpire Moggi e Giraudo'". Calcioblog (in Italian).
- Oliva, Alessandro (16 October 2015). "Inter-Juventus, amici mai". Linkiesta (in Italian).
- "Ora l'Inter è davvero nei guai! Ecco l'intercettazione shock con Facchetti nello spogliatoio di Bertini!". Goal.com (in Italian). 25 May 2010.
- Palazzi, Stefano (1 July 2011). "Relazione del Procuratore Federale FIGC" (PDF) (in Italian). FIGC – via Ju29ro.com.
- Palombo, Ruggiero (22 April 2016). "Dieci anni dopo 'Calciopoli' la lezione è servita?". La Gazzetta dello Sport (in Italian).
- Pambianchi, Matteo (10 November 2011). "Marco Travaglio: 'L'Inter tentò invano di entrare nel giro'". TuttoMercatoWeb.com (in Italian).
- Pampinella, Gianni (13 December 2019). "Cruz: 'L'Inter non vinceva per Calciopoli, che strano quel Bologna-Juve! Balo? Fu montato'". La Gazzetta dello Sport (in Italian).
- "Parla Tavaroli: 'Su ordine di Tronchetti ho salvato Montezemolo e pedinato Moggi'". Jmania (in Italian). 5 June 2010.
- Parlongo, Ivan (5 July 2011). "Le intercettazioni che incastrano Facchetti e l'Inter". Il Pallonaro (in Italian).
- Pavan, Massimo (24 August 2012). "Rileggendo Sandulli rabbrividiamo..." TuttoMercatoWeb.com (in Italian).
- Pediglieri, Alessio (31 May 2011). "Inter: 6 anni di vittorie nerazzurre e 15 trofei, tra grandi e piccoli Triplete". Fanpage (in Italian).
- "Penale Sent. Sez. 3 Num. 36350 Anno 2015" (PDF) (in Italian). Corte Suprema di Cassazione, Terza Sezione Penale. 24 March 2015. Archived from the original (PDF) on 15 January 2016.
- "Perché gli juventini vengono chiamati 'gobbi'". Il Post (in Italian). 24 November 2014.
- Pisapia, Luca (14 June 2012). "Calciopoli, Tavaroli accusa ancora: 'L'Inter mi chiese di spiare Moggi'". Il Fatto Quotidiano (in Italian).
- Porro, Nicola (6 June 2010). "Tronchetti Provera: 'Ecco la verità su Telecom'". Il Giornale (in Italian).
- Provenzano, Eva A. (5 January 2014). "Recoba: 'Calciopoli? La Juve poteva vincere lo stesso. E lo scudetto del 2006...'". La Gazzetta dello Sport (in Italian).
- "Post-Calciopoli". Treccani (in Italian). 22 April 2019.
- "Rai Tre Un Giorno in Pretura – Calciopoli" (in Italian). RAI. June 2013.
- Ramazzotti, Andrea (21 November 2014). "Padre Agnelli assolve Lucianone". Corriere della Sport (in Italian).
- Ravelli, Arianna (29 October 2016). "Juventus, Agnelli riabilita Tavecchio, ma lo riporta comunque in tribunale". Corriere della Sera (in Italian).
- "Recoba si dimentica della sua Inter 'Lo Scudetto 2006 l'ha vinto la Juve'". Calciomercato.com (in Italian). 5 October 2012.
- "Roberto Renga a #RadioVS: 'La Juve con Calciopoli subì un sopruso! Milinkovic-Savic è super, i bianconeri per arrivarci hanno offerto due giocatori. Golovin ha grandi colpi, ecco cosa gli direbbe Allegri se arrivasse. Su Higuain e Icardi...'". TuttoMercatoWeb.com (in Italian). 16 February 2018.
- Romano, Luigi Maria (26 October 2014). "Calciopoli, tra Juve e Inter è guerra aperta: clamorosa idea di Andrea Agnelli". CalcioWeb (in Italian).
- Romano, Luca (19 February 2017). "Calciopoli, Porceddu: 'Un errore dare scudetto all'Inter'". Il Giornale (in Italian).
- Rossini, Claudio (5 March 2014). "Calciopoli e la verità di comodo". Blasting News (in Italian).
- Russo, Luca (8 December 2018). "Juventus-Inter, Calciopoli è archiviata: ottimi rapporti tra Agnelli e Zhang". 90min (in Italian). Archived from the original on 31 May 2022.
- Salvetti, Marina (29 October 2010). "Calciopoli, caccia agli scudetti. 'Juve, puoi già chiederli'". Tuttosport (in Italian). Archived from the original on 1 November 2010.
- Sarica, Federico (10 July 2011). "Calciopoli, il sentimento popolare". Rivista Studio (in Italian).
- "Sconcerti: 'Calciopoli ha fatto scoppiare Milan e Inter, fossi la Juve mi arrabbierei! Ventura? Tutto calcolato'". Calciomercato.com (in Italian). 12 November 2018.
- "Scudetto 2006, Aigner: 'L'Uefa premeva per la classifica'". Sky Sport (in Italian). 8 July 2011.
- "Scudetto 2006: il parere dei 3 saggi". Corriere della Sera (in Italian). 1 July 2011.
- "Scudetto 2006: ufficiale, resta all'Inter; Juve 'Chiediamo i danni'". Calciomercato.com (in Italian). 18 July 2011.
- "Scudetto 'degli onesti' o 'di cartone'?". Calciomercato.com (in Italian). 10 February 2011.
- Segreto, Michele (5 October 2012). "Recoba dice la sua sullo scudetto del 2006". Calcioblog (in Italian). Archived from the original on 27 June 2021.
- "Sentenza Moggi" (PDF) (in Italian). Italian Supreme Court of Cassation, Criminal Section III. 23 March 2015.
- "Sentenza Moggi/ Beccantini: l'atteggiamento della Juventus è incomprensibile (esclusiva)". Il Sussidario. 10 November 2011. Archived from the original on 22 January 2022.
- "Servizio Pubblico lancia 'Forza Italia', inchiesta a fumetti sul calcioscommesse". Il Fatto Quotidiano (in Italian). 2 July 2012.
- Siragusano, Antonio (29 August 2018). "Moggi: 'Ronaldo-Iuliano? Probabilmente era rigore. Moratti mi aveva preso all'Inter, avevo già venduto Moriero, ma poi...'". La Gazzetta dello Sport (in Italian).
- "'Speravo che l'Inter rinunciasse alla prescrizione'". La Repubblica (in Italian). 18 July 2011.
- "Sorteggio regolare. E la Gazzetta tace". Ju29ro.com (in Italian). 2 June 2010.
- "Su Moggi, la Triade e la Juve, l'ex designatore Bergamo racconta un'altra storia... 'Calciopoli? C'era un gruppo – Elkann e Montezemolo – che lavorava per disintegrare Giraudo'". Goal.com (in Italian). 26 October 2011.
- "Supercoppa Italiana – Nono titolo per la Juve, è record! L'albo d'oro completo". La Gazzetta dello Sport (in Italian). 21 January 2021.
- Surano, Angelo Dino (10 May 2018). "Juventus, 4° double consecutivo: rivoluzione con o senza Allegri oppure solo qualche ritocco". Stadio Sport (in Italian).
- "Tavecchio ad Agnelli: ritira la causa". Calciomercato.com (in Italian). 12 September 2015.
- "Tavecchio: 'Calciopoli? Assurda la causa alla Figc ma quella Juve avrebbe vinto comunque'". La Repubblica (in Italian). 6 February 2015.
- "Tavecchio: 'Io interista? Ho sempre avuto simpatia...'". Tuttosport (in Italian). 19 September 2016.
- "Telefonata inequivocabile tra Facchetti e Bergamo: 'Bertini? Con lui abbiamo quattro vittorie', 'Facciamo cinque...'". Goal.com (in Italian). 5 May 2010.
- "Telelombardia – Calciopoli: il punto di vista di Sandulli". TuttoMercatoWeb.com (in Italian). 13 April 2010.
- Toscano, Francesco (19 June 2015), "Massimo De Santis: il condannato di Calciopoli (1)", Il calcio è uguale per tutti (in Italian).
- Toscano, Francesco (26 December 2017), "La Calciopoli di Guido Rossi ovvero: Calciopoli è interista?", Il calcio è uguale per tutti (in Italian).
- "Travaglio attacca: 'Da juventino ho sempre saputo chi fosse Moggi. Questi signori dovrebbero ringraziare di averla fatta franca. Campionati irregolari per la giustizia ordinaria'". TuttoMercatoWeb.com (in Italian). 24 March 2015.
- "Tuttosport e Juventus contro: 'Basta, fate troppe critiche'. 'Avete fallito, cosa volete?'". Blitz Quotidiano (in Italian). 14 March 2011.
- Vaciago, Guido (28 July 2015). "Cassazione: 'Sistema inquinato'. Ma non spiega i misteri di Calciopoli". Tuttosport (in Italian).
- Vaciago, Guido (21 September 2015). "Calciopoli: Ju29ro si ferma, la controinformazione resiste". Tuttosport (in Italian).
- Vaciago, Guido (18 February 2017). "Juventus, il giudice Porceddu: 'Che errore assegnare lo scudetto 2006 all'Inter'". Tuttosport (in Italian).
- Vessicchio, Sergio (1 May 2021). "Inter è scudetto ma c'è chi pensa di far riaprire Calciopoli per i nerazzurri". Calcio Goal (in Italian).
- "Vieri: via lo Scudetto 2006 all'Inter. Moratti intercettato". Sky Sport (in Italian). 2 April 2010.
- Vignati, Alessandro (17 July 2016). "Fulvio Bianchi: 'La Juve e la Figc e quello Scudetto del 2006...'". TuttoMercatoWeb.com (in Italian).
- Weatherhill, Anthony (5 October 2018). "Moratti e Agnelli: una volta nemici". La Gazzetta dello Sport (in Italian).
- Ziliani, Paolo (20 March 2014). "Calciopoli, per la Corte d'Appello di Napoli sette anni di campionati falsati". Il Fatto Quotidiano (in Italian).

==== 2020s ====
- "Agnelli: 'Moggi? si può perdonare' E lui: Non serve. Semmai elogiatemi". Corriere della Sera (in Italian). 14 November 2021.
- "Antonio Conte, dai successi con la Juve allo scudetto con l'Inter". Sky TG24 (in Italian). 2 May 2021.
- Baiocco, Francesco (7 May 2020). "20 anni fa il gol fantasma di Cannavaro". Momenti di Calcio (in Italian).
- Beltrami, Marco (24 October 2020). "Javier Zanetti: Del Piero e co. meritavano sul campo, ma con calciopoli non vincevamo mai". Fanpage (in Italian).
- Biscotti, Giuseppe (9 March 2020). "Moggi: 'Calciopoli? Una farsa. La Juventus dava fastidio perché vinceva troppo'". SuperNews (in Italian).
- "Branca: 'Inter facilitata da Calciopoli? Quando una squadra apre un ciclo dà sempre fastidio'". L'Arena del Calcio (in Italian). 22 August 2020.
- "Calciopoli, 9 anni fa la vera vergogna del calcio italiano: Illeciti dell'Inter caduti in prescrizione e scudetto regalato ai nerazzurri. E quei faldoni spariti..." L'Arena del Calcio (in Italian). 18 July 2020.
- "'Calciopoli – Anatomia di un processo', una produzione originale in tv". Corriere dello Sport (in Italian). 26 May 2022.
- "Calciopoli, clamorosa svolta per Giraudo: la Corte Europea accetta il ricorso, ecco cosa può succedere". Calciomercato.com (in Italian). 9 September 2021.
- "Calciopoli, Luciano Moggi cita il giornalista Guido Vaciago: 'Non servono le sentenze di Cassazione per riscrivere la storia'". L'Arena del Calcio (in Italian). 26 January 2020.
- "Calciopoli, Moggi: 'Se la Corte Europea ha accettato il ricorso significa che ci sono elementi di cui parlare'". L'Arena del Calcio (in Italian). 1 October 2021.
- "Calciopoli, il TAR dichiara inammissibile il ricorso della Juventus". Sportmediaset (in Italian). 28 October 2022.
- Cardinali, Thomas (7 March 2020). "Luciano Moggi a Snaps: 'Calciopoli? No, Farsopoli'". Giornalettismo (in Italian).
- "Carraro: Calciopoli colpa mia ma Juve avrebbe vinto uguale". Sport e Vai (in Italian). 12 December 2020.
- "Carraro: 'Simpatizzo ancora Milan, ma da quando sono andati via Berlusconi e Galliani...'". La Gazzetta dello Sport (in Italian). 29 March 2020.
- Censoni, Mattia (27 May 2020). "Uno schiaffo in faccia a tutti gli antijuventini! Altro che favoriti: l'elenco dei 10 'furti' storici subiti dai bianconeri". Tribuna.com.
- Cirillo, Luca (10 November 2021). "Forgione: 'Calciopoli, Moggi non è l'unico. Sapete perché ora dice di tifare Napoli?'". Arena Napoli (in Italian).
- "Chirico: 'Sandulli unica voce nel silenzio di Calciopoli: lo scudetto all'Inter non andava assegnato'". Arena Calcio (in Italian). 1 May 2021.
- Ciccù, Consolato (7 March 2020). "Moggi: 'Facile attaccare la Juve dopo la morte di Agnelli. Ce l'avevano con noi perché vincevamo troppo'". CalcioWeb.
- Cimini, Luca (23 January 2020). "Chirico ai tifosi dell'Inter: 'Perché vi arrabbiate se vi diciamo che siete prescritti?'". Blasting News (in Italian).
- Cimini, Luca (12 March 2020). "Moggi su Calciopoli: 'Si trattò di Farsopoli, Juventus debole dopo morte di Agnelli'". Blasting News (in Italian).
- "Cruciani: 'Simpatizzo Juve perché Calciopoli è stata un'ingiustizia. Ce l'ho con gli antijuventini'". OneFootball (in Italian). 11 January 2021.
- Coccia, Pasquale (18 January 2020). "Il contado tifa per la zebra". Il manifesto (in Italian).
- "Da Moggi bordate su Moratti, Calciopoli non finisce mai". Virgilio (in Italian). 20 February 2020.
- De Felice, Alessandro (21 January 2023). "Calciopoli 2006: cosa è successo, squadre coinvolte e penalizzazioni". Goal.com (in Italian).
- Demichelis, Benedetta (12 January 2021). "Cruciani: 'Simpatizzo per la Juventus perché Calciopoli è stata un'ingiustizia'". Blasting News (in Italian).
- Donato, Lelio (2 May 2021). "I 9 Scudetti della Juventus: la storia di un ciclo irripetibile". Goal.com (in Italian).
- D'Ottavi, Marco (1 April 2020). "L'anno in cui la Juventus giocò in Serie B". L'Ultimo Uomo (in Italian). Sky Sport Italia.
- "Ex Juve, Moggi attacca Carraro: 'Ricordi quando Collina e Galliani...'". Calciomercato.com (in Italian). 6 August 2020.
- Fava, Marco (24 March 2020). "Il 'Totonero' del 1980: quando il calcio finì in manette". PokerStars News (in Italian).
- Fava, Marco (21 April 2020). "Calciopoli 2006: lo scandalo che rivoluzionò la Serie A". PokerStars News (in Italian).
- Galanto, Massimo (8 November 2021). "Oliviero Beha, Rai deve risarcire famiglia per 180mila euro". TvBlog (in Italian).
- "Il giornalista e amico di Beha, Angelo Forgione: 'In Calciopoli l'Inter colpevole. Questo non lo dico io ma lo fece capire Paolo Bergamo'". Stile Juve (in Italian). 11 November 2021.
- "(Inter)nazionale: da quanto tempo lo scudetto non era così azzurro". Sky Sport (in Italian). 2 May 2021.
- "Juventus-Parma del 2000, le parole di De Santis sul gol annullato a Cannavaro". La Gazzetta dello Sport (in Italian). 12 June 2020.
- "La Juve non dimentica gli Scudetti revocati: 'Ogni tentativo per la riassegnazione'". Goal.com (in Italian). 14 October 2020.
- Lamorte, Vito (8 March 2022). "Dopo 16 anni la Juventus rivuole ancora lo Scudetto di Calciopoli: ricorso al TAR". Fanpage (in Italian).
- "L'avvocato Zaccone: 'Tifo Toro, ma ho difeso la Juve in Calciopoli. Mi hanno pagato bene...'". La Repubblica (in Italian). 19 September 2020 – via TuttoMercatoWeb.com.
- Masiello, Gaetano (8 May 2020). "Moggi: 'Moratti si tenga lo scudetto di cartone ma la Juventus è stata truffata'". SuperNews (in Italian).
- Minchiotti, Gianluca (21 April 2021). "'Siete come la Juve': Inter e Milan al traino di Agnelli sulla Superlega, senza metterci la faccia, ora sono uguali". Calciomercato.com (in Italian).
- "Moggi su Calciopoli: 'La morte dell'avv. Agnelli ci aveva resi orfani e deboli, facile attaccare la Juve e distruggerla inventando le cose'". Arena Calcio (in Italian). 11 March 2020.
- Morrone, Daniel V. (5 May 2020). "Il cinque maggio". L'Ultimo Uomo (in Italian). Sky Sport Italia.
- Palazzo, Silvana (25 October 2021). "Paolo Ziliani vs Juventus/ 'Montero e mia moglie? Messo alla gogna dopo Calciopoli...'". Il Sussidario (in Italian).
- Panzone, Antonio (22 October 2021). "Il lato oscuro dello sport: Calciopoli raccontato da Netflix". Corriere di Napoli (in Italian).
- Passacantando, Sergio (4 April 2009). "La risposta agli anti juventini". TuttoMercatoWeb.com (in Italian).
- "Perugia-Juventus: e lo scudetto piovve dal cielo". Storie di Calcio (in Italian). 24 February 2020.
- "Pistocchi accusa: '7 maggio 2000, De Santis annullò gol per fallo che nessuno ha visto'. Chirico lo smonta: 'Gol nato da calcio d'angolo inesistente. Bugie peggio del virus'". L'Arena del Calcio (in Italian). 10 May 2020.
- "Ronaldo, Juve-Inter 1998 e il fallo di Iuliano: 'Che bisogno avevano di quegli aiuti?'. Del Piero: 'Anni macchiati'". Corriere della Sera (in Italian). 9 May 2020.
- Rossi, Mario (11 June 2020). "L'ex arbitro De Santis fa mea culpa su un suo celebre errore a favore della Juve, poi spiazza tutti: 'Ero interista'". Tribuna.com.
- Svoboda, Martin (21 May 2020). "Elio Corno frase #196875". Le citazioni (in Italian).
- "Tavecchio: 'Risarcimento Figc? Ottimi rapporti con la Juve, ma nel 2006 chiesero loro la Serie B. Su Conte...'". Calciomercato.com (in Italian). 1 June 2020.
- Vendemiale, Lorenzo (26 July 2020). "Juventus campione d'Italia per la nona volta di fila: lo 'scudetto di cartone' conta solo per il futuro bianconero". Il Fatto Quotidiano (in Italian).
- Vessicchio, Sergio (10 September 2021). "La Corte Europea riapre clamorosamente Calciopoli, ammesso il ricorso di Giraudo". Calcio Goal (in Italian).

=== Previous scandals and controversies ===
- Arduini, Stefano (24 September 2003). "La commedia del calcio: attore per attore". Vita (in Italian).
- Candido, Cannavò (8 January 2000). "Rolex d' oro della Roma ai designatori degli arbitri". La Gazzetta dello Sport (in Italian).
- Curzi, Matteo (8 September 2020). "Storia di passaporti e complottismo". Sportellate.it (in Italian).
- Foot, John M. (December 1999). "From boomtown to bribesville: the images of the city, Milan, 1980–97". Urban History. 26 (3): 393–412. doi:10.1017/S0963926899000346. JSTOR 44613087.
- Gaetani, Marco (2 March 2018). "Uomini Scudetto". L'Ultimo Uomo (in Italian). Sky Sport Italia.
- "Juve furibonda, Roma soddisfatta Bettega: Come giocare a 3 porte". La Repubblica (in Italian). 5 May 2001.
- "Lucchesi: 'Gli orologi erano solo un regalo, lo fecero anche Inter e Milan'". Pagine Romaniste (in Italian). 5 January 2014.
- Onorato, Liliana (13 September 2016). "Tangentopoli (Italy)". Global Informality Project.
- "Orologi, champagne e... salumi: che storia quella dei regali agli arbitri". Blitz Quotidiano (in Italian). 14 April 2010.
- "Dai Rolex allo champagne tutti i doni del presidente". La Repubblica (in Italian). 8 January 2000.
- "Rolex agli arbitri bufera sulla Roma". La Repubblica (in Italian). 8 January 2000.
- Ruta, Alessandro (7 October 2020). "All'origine dello scandalo 'Passaportopoli'". L'Ultimo Uomo (in Italian). Sky Sport Italia.
- "Serie A, Calciopoli infinita: nuovo ricorso della Juventus al TAR contro lo scudetto dato all'Inter". Eurosport (in Italian). 8 March 2022.
- "Tangènte". Treccani (in Italian). 12 March 2013.
- "Un tifoso del Torino nemico per un giorno". La Stampa (in Italian). 19 December 1975. p. 20.

=== Previous and subsequent controversies ===
- "Boggi, che attacco a Nicchi: 'Si rischia un'altra Calciopoli'". Corriere dello Sport (in Italian). 4 February 2020.
- Cecino, Carlo (25 February 2019). "Il naufragio della Juventus nel diluvio di Perugia". Catenaccio e Contropiede (in Italian).
- "Chirico provoca: Chi vuole una nuova Calciopoli". Virgilio (in Italian). 22 February 2020.
- De Santis, Maurizio (5 May 2020). "Audio sparito di Inter-Juventus 2018, De Santis: 'Può nascere una nuova Calciopoli'". Fanpage (in Italian).
- Fiorenza, Paolo (15 May 2021). "La Juventus non fa il 'pasillo' d'onore all'Inter: nessun omaggio per lo Scudetto". Fanpage (in Italian).
- "Il Parma: 'Gol valido' La rabbia della Lazio". La Repubblica (in Italian). 7 May 2000.
- "Inter-Juve 2018, De Santis: 'Pecoraro? Può nascere una nuova Calciopoli'". Corriere dello Sport.it (in Italian). 5 May 2020.
- "Juventus-Inter, 'pasillo' d'onore per i nerazzurri? Tifosi in rivolta". Goal.com (in Italian). 14 May 2021.
- Mocciaro, Gaetano (5 May 2019). "5 maggio 2002, l'Inter perde lo scudetto all'ultima curva. Juve campione". TuttoMercatoWeb.com (in Italian).
- Munno, Mauro (13 April 2018). "Calori: 'Collina? A Perugia non scelse da solo: quei casini nella penultima giornata...' – Esclusiva". Juventus News 24 (in Italian).
- Nigro, Giuseppe (14 May 2021). "Storia di omaggi ai vincitori: Juve, farai il pasillo' all'Inter? I precedenti tra i club..." La Gazzetta dello Sport (in Italian).
- Pizzimenti, Marcello (10 February 2020). "Serie A, ombre di una nuova calciopoli: l'affondo del giornalista". TuttoMotoriWeb (in Italian). Archived from the original on 1 July 2021.
- Pratesi, Riccardo (20 August 2005). "Supercoppa, trionfo Inter". Gazzetta dello Sport (in Italian).
- Quadarella, Francesco (28 December 2018). "Ei fu, siccome immobile, dato il gol della Lazio". Catenaccio e Contropiede (in Italian). Archived from the original on 30 July 2021.
- "Rivelazione choc di Calori sul famoso Perugia-Juve: 'Gaucci ci minacciò perché...'". Blasting News (in Italian). 14 November 2014.
- "Supercoppa, all'Inter il primo trofeo". Corriere della Sera (in Italian). 21 August 2005.
