= Calciopoli trials =

Criminal proceedings in Italian football

Sports proceedings began soon after Calciopoli, an association football scandal, was made public in May 2006. In July 2006, the Italian Football Federation's (FIGC) Federal Court of Justice started the sports trial. Juventus was relegated to Serie B with points-deduction, while other clubs (Arezzo, Fiorentina, Lazio, Milan, Pescara, Reggina, Siena, and Triestina) only received points deductions. Most of implicated club's presidents and executives, as well as referees, referee designators, referee assistants, and FIGC higher-ups were initially proposed to be banned for life but only Juventus CEO Antonio Giraudo and Juventus general director Luciano Moggi were confirmed to be banned for life. Two criminal trials took place in Naples, the first related to Calciopoli proper, while the second involved consultancy company GEA World, which was alleged to hold power over all transfers and Italian football players and agents; all defendants were acquitted of the stronger charges. Moggi's legal defence attempted to present those new developments at the Naples court but they were refused because the court ruled that it was there to determinate whether Moggi's lifetime ban should be confirmed and the gravity of his actions, as was sentenced in the controversial 2006 sports trial.

The Naples trial much reduced Moggi's power and that of his charged criminal association (la Cupola, literally "the Dome"); nonetheless, based on the 2006 sports trial, the Naples Court of Appeal confirmed Moggi and Giraudo's lifetime ban, and Moggi's criminal association charge. In 2015, the Supreme Court ruled in its final resolution that Moggi was acquitted of "some individual charges for sports fraud, but not from being the 'promoter' of the 'criminal conspiracy' that culminated in Calciopoli", although there were only 6 convictions (including Moggi and Giraudo) out of the initial 37 defendants; Massimo De Santis was the only referee to be convicted, while the other five's charges were annulled because of the statute of limitations. In 2018, the Supreme Court rejected Juventus's appeal, ending the dispute in the ordinary justice system. In 2020, the CONI's College of Guarantee declared the latest Juventus's appeal to not be admissible, also exhausting all the levels of judgment, and ending the dispute in the sports justice system. Both Moggi and Giraudo appealed to the European Court of Human Rights for the conduct of the trials, which remain a debated and controversial topic.

== Overview ==
=== Sports trial, 2006–2012 ===
In July 2006, the FIGC's Federal Court of Justice started the sports trial. Juventus was originally to be relegated to Serie C, even though relegation is always for the immediately lower division according to the Italian sports law, for sports illicit (Italian: illecito sportivo), while three other clubs (Fiorentina, Lazio, and Milan) were to be relegated to Serie B. The FIGC prosecutor Stefano Palazzi called for all implicated four clubs to be thrown out of Serie A. Palazzi called for all four clubs to be relegated to Serie B with points-deduction (6 points for Juventus, 3 points for Milan, and 15 points for both Fiorentina and Lazio). Palazzi also called for Juventus to be stripped of the 2004–05 Serie A title, and to be downgraded to the last place in the 2005–06 Serie A championship. In August 2006, Palazzi called for Reggina to be relegated to Serie B with a 15-point penalty; this was later changed to the same 15-point penalty without relegation, a €30,000 fine, and club president Pasquale Foti fined €30,000 and banned from football for 2 1/2 years.

After appeals, punishment for Fiorentina, Lazio, and Milan was changed to points penalty and one or two home matches behind closed doors; Milan was also admitted to the 2006–07 UEFA Champions League, which the club went on win, despite UEFA's initial opposition due to its involvement in the scandal. Juventus controversially dropped its appeal and was the only club to be relegated to the 2006–07 Serie B, starting with a 30-point penalty, later reduced to 17, and to 9. Most of implicated club's presidents and executives, as well as referees, referee designators, referee assistants, and FIGC higher-ups, were initially proposed to be banned for life. By October 2006, they were handed a ban for a few years, fined, or warned. Several of them, such as Lazio president Claudio Lotito and then-Milan vice-president and Lega Calcio president Adriano Galliani, later returned to old or new positions in their own clubs and in Italian football institutions; Juventus's CEO Antonio Giraudo and general director's Luciano Moggi were the only executives to be banned. In June 2011, six months before the end of the initial five-year ban, the FIGC announced that Moggi and Giraudo were banned for life, which was confirmed by the FIGC's Federal Court of Appeal in July 2011. In April 2012, CONI's High Court of Sports Justice upheld bans for Moggi, Giraudo, and former FIGC vice-president Innocenzo Mazzini.

=== Criminal trials, 2008–2015 ===
Two criminal trials took place in Naples, the first related to Calciopoli proper, while the second involved GEA World, a consultancy company with offices in Rome, Dubai, and London, operating in sports business industry, which was alleged to hold power over all transfers and Italian football players and agents. Some analysts commented that the ordinary and criminal trial, which would be held in Naples, should have been held Turin due to the latter having territorial jurisdiction, as was the case in the sports doping investigation started in 1998; Turin's Office of the Judge for Preliminary Investigations twice rejected, when the sports doping investigation was coming to an end in 2004, telephone tapping due to no legal relevance being found for the charge of association for sporting delinquency (associazione per delinquere finalizzata alla frode in competizione sportiva, literally association for delinquency aimed at fraud in sports competition, henceforth criminal association) and for insufficient evidence, respectively. Critics question why two judges specialized in the fight against Camorra would take up a football case. Moggi's legal defence said both Turin and Rome, where the investigation started, were more appropriate territorial jurisdictions than Naples. The GEA World criminal trials also involving Alessandro Moggi concluded with all defendants acquitted of the criminal association charge, and the Moggis were only charged of duress and attempted duress, which were annulled and declared by the Supreme Court of Cassation in 2014 due to the statute of limitations.

The Naples trial resulted in Calciopoli bis, which implicated almost every Serie A club, including Inter Milan, to which it was awarded the 2006 scudetto; the FIGC prosecutor Palazzi charged Inter Milan, Livorno, and Milan to have violated both Article 1 and Article 6 of the Code of Sports Justice, which could have resulted in their demotion to Serie B; the statute of limitations did not allow Palazzi's charges to be confirmed. Palazzi's 2011 report stated that Inter Milan would have been the club to risk the most, as the charged illicits were committed by its own president, the late Giacinto Facchetti, whose son Gianfelice Facchetti later sued Moggi for his statements about Facchetti's involvement but the Milan court ruled that Moggi's statements about Facchetti lobbying for referees were truthful. Moggi's legal defence attempted to present those new developments at the Naples court but they were refused because the court was there to rule whether Moggi's lifetime ban should be confirmed and the gravity of his actions, as sentenced in the 2006 sports trial, which has been criticized for its hastiness and sentences, based on evidence and arguments later found to be discredited due to newly emerging wiretaps.

The Naples trial much reduced Moggi's power and that of his criminal association charge, with several allegations charged by the prosecution, such as locking referees in dressing rooms, controlling the referee selection processes, influencing referees, bribery, lavish gift-offerings, player agency control, accounting fraud, undetectable web of communication, direct referee contact, match-fixing, and attempted match-fixing, being discredited. The criminal trial confirmed Juventus's extraneousness, that Moggi had acted for his personal interest in saving Fiorentina from relegation, and the two championships won by the club were regular (as stated in the first instance sports trial, which investigated the 2004–05 championship) and no fixed or altered match was found. Then-FIGC president Franco Carraro, who in one wiretap stated to then-referee designator Paolo Bergamo that Fiorentina and Lazio needed to be helped in order to avoid their relegation, was not prosecuted in Naples. In 2015, the Supreme Court ruled in its final resolution that Moggi was acquitted of "some individual charges for sports fraud, but not from being the 'promoter' of the 'criminal conspiracy' that culminated in Calciopoli". Five of the six convictions from the Naples trial were annulled due the statute of limitations; only the referee Massimo De Santis, out of the initial 37 defendants, was convicted with a reduced sentence.

=== Reactions and aftermath ===
Supporters of the trials and antijuventini, the latter a term to describe Juventus's hatred, felt vindicated by the rulings that the Dome was real. Critics including journalists and judges, among others, said that there remains several inconsistencies and other aspects not fully clear, which is also conceded by supporters of the trials. Ultimately, 30 out 36 referees were acquitted of the charges, with the criminal association being reduced to Moggi, Giraudo, Mazzini, referee designator Pierluigi Pairetto, and referee Salvatore Racalbuto. De Santis, the only other referee to be convicted, originally as promoter of the criminal association and later reduced to simple associate, and the only defendant to be convicted, as he renounced to the statute of limitations, was upset after the ruling. In its final judgments in 2015, the Supreme Court said that the system was rather widespread and that the developments in the behavior of other Serie A clubs, that of Inter Milan and Milan in particular, which could not be taken in account due to the statute of limitations in the ruling against Moggi and the defendants, were not deepened by the investigations.

As a club, Juventus was found extraneous from Moggi and Giraudo. Juventus was not found to have violated both Article 1 and Article 6, and instead was retroactively relegated due to a newly created rule, referred to in the court as an associative illicit (illecito associativo) but best known as structured illicit (illecito strutturato), a term that was added to the Code of Sport Justice after the scandal became public. As this was based on the theory that Juventus had a privileged or exclusive relationship with referee designators, which was later discredited, the club appealed to get the two championship back. The 2006 scudetto was assigned ad personam by then-FIGC commissioner Guido Rossi, who was involved in both Inter Milan and Inter Milan's main sponsor TIM Group, and not by the FIGC or Lega Calcio, on the basis of a joint decision of Three Sages (tre saggi), one of whom voted in favour, while the other two abstained and voted against the re-assignation to another club, respectively; the other championship, that of 2005–06, was not object of investigation in the sports and ordinary trials, which confirmed there were not irregularities in the two championships. Juventus asked for the 2005–06 championship to be revoked from Inter Milan, wanting both championships back, and sought a €444 million lawsuit for damage claims due to unequal treatment (disparità di trattamento); all its appeals were rejected due to the courts declaring themselves not competent on technical issues rather than juridical grounds.

Like the scandal proper, which originated not from the major sports press or investigative journalism press but from Il Romanista, a newspaper entirely dedicated to Roma supporters, and soon after popularized by Milan-based La Gazzetta dello Sport, the trials remain debated and a controversial topic; the 2006 SISMI-Telecom scandal is related with this case due the group accused of industrial espionage in both cases being the Tiger Team led by major Inter Milan shareholder Marco Tronchetti Provera, which some critics questioned for the case's heavy reliance on wiretaps and their legality. The trials themselves are criticized for giving legal defence only 7 days to read a 7,000-page dossier, for being one-sided against Juventus and Moggi, and for not hearing all witnesses or the wiretaps, which emerged only years later; critics have since questioned why they were hidden in the first place, when they have always been at the FIGC headquarters since 2006, and why they were not used in the sports trial, or why of the 170,000 wiretaps, the FIGC's Federal Prosecutor's Office listened to 80 of them, most of which involving Moggi, and this process lasted only a couple of weeks.

The sentences themselves are object of controversy and criticism, among them the many loopholes and the fact they were reported in advance by La Gazzetta dello Sport. Of particular criticism is Juventus's relegation and harsher punishment; even though no match was altered or fixed, this was based on sentimento popolare ("people's feelings") that Juventus was favoured, which was mentioned in the sports sentence; sudditanza psicologica ("psychological subjection"), something to which referees were subjected that cannot be proven and is subjective; and the ad hoc rule to relegate Juventus through repeated Article 1 violations without committing an Article 6 violation. Although several sports law experts said that the scandal would have taken months to resolve the case, including appeals to Lazio's Regional Administrative Court (TAR) and a potential appeal to the Court of Arbitration for Sport, to favour the start of the next championship, the 2006–07 Serie A, which risked to be postponed sine die, the FIGC eliminated an instance degree of the trial.

In December 2018, the Supreme Court rejected Juventus's appeal against Rome's Court of Appeal, ending the dispute through ordinary justice system. In January 2020, the CONI's College of Guarantee declared that Juventus's appeal was not admissible, exhausting all the levels of judgment, and sanctioning the de facto end of the dispute in the sports justice system. By March 2020, both Moggi and Giraudo appealed to the European Court of Human Rights for the conduct of the trials and the few time given to legal defences; Giraudo's appeal was accepted in September 2021, and he is being represented by Amedeo Rosboch, the same lawyer who defended Jean-Marc Bosman in the revolutionary Bosman ruling in association football. In March 2022, Juventus presented a new appeal to the TAR. By October 2022, both the March and another June appeal were declared inadmissible.

== Sports trial, 2004–2006 ==
=== Background ===
The first signs of Calciopoli emerged in 2005 through some press rumors relating to football investigations conducted by the Turin prosecutor; the investigation, conducted by the prosecutor Raffaele Guariniello, ended with a dismissal due to the non-existence of criminally relevant situations but also with the simultaneous sending of material, deemed relevant on a disciplinary level, to the FIGC. The investigation followed a few months later another called Offside (named after the English football term in reference to the offside position), started in the summer of 2004 by the Naples Prosecutor's Office and focused on betting in association football.

The press rumors multiplied in the spring of 2006 and the scandal came to light, first with the news that the FIGC had begun to investigate episodes of alleged corruption in the football and refereeing worlds on 2 May 2006, and then with the publication of the first wiretaps starting from 4 May 2006, which was a few days after the end of the 2005–06 Serie A, even if those wiretaps were all related to the 2004–05 Serie A. The first names that emerged from the wiretaps were those of former referee designator Pierluigi Pairetto, Luciano Moggi and Antonio Giraudo, general director and CEO of Juventus, respectively, and FIGC vice-president Innocenzo Mazzini. In the following weeks, the names of other club executives, referees, and FIGC officials appeared, including the-then FIGC president Franco Carraro.

The wiretaps included some journalists and opinion leaders of television and print media in contact with Moggi, such as Aldo Biscardi and former referee and designator Fabio Baldas (conductor and moviolista, respectively, of Il processo di Biscardi on La7), Tony Damascelli (il Giornale), Guido D'Ubaldo (Corriere dello Sport), Franco Melli (Il Tempo and guest at Biscardi's talk show), Lamberto Sposini (TG5 and guest at Biscardi's talk show), Giorgio Tosatti (Rai Sport), Ignazio Scardina (Rai Sport), and Ciro Venerato (Rai Sport). The position of almost all the reporters under the criminal profile was to closed in 2007, even if some of them were to be suspended for some time by the Italian Order of Journalists; they were accused of being advised by Moggi what to say on television or what to write about their newspapers. The only one to be investigated and tried for criminal association was Scardina, who was later acquitted in the first instance by the court of Naples. Among the intercepted, there was also the then Minister of the Interior Giuseppe Pisanu, who asked through Moggi refereeing favours for Sassari Torres, which at that time was in Serie C1.

=== First consequences ===
After the publication of the first wiretaps, Carraro resigned as president of the FIGC on 8 May 2006, and was followed two days later by that of Mazzini, who was one of his deputies as the FIGC vice-president. On 11 May, Juventus's board of directors resigned.

On 12 May, it was announced that the Naples Public Prosecutor's Office had entered 41 people in the register of suspects, including club executives, FIGC officials, referees, referee designators, referee assistants, a journalist, and DIGOS agents. Among them were FIGC higher-ups Carraro and Mazzini, Moggi and Giraudo of Juventus, Fiorentina president Andrea della Valle, Fiorentina's honorary president Diego Della Valle, Fiorentina executive director Sandro Mencucci, Lazio president Claudio Lotito, A.C. Milan's employee Leonardo Meani, GEA director Alessandro Moggi, former referee designators Paolo Bergamo and Pierluigi Pairetto, AIA president Tullio Lanese, and referees Massimo De Santis, Pasquale Rodomonti, Paolo Bertini, Paolo Dondarini, Marco Gabriele, Domenico Messina, Gianluca Rocchi, Salvatore Racalbuto, and Paolo Tagliavento. In the invitations to appear, 13 were suspects of criminal association aimed at sports fraud, 24 for sports fraud, two for violation of office secrececy, and two for embezzlement. The club investigated were Juventus, Fiorentina, Lazio, and Milan, while the matches were 20, 19 of which were related to the 2004–05 season, and one was related to the 2004–05 Serie B. In April 2007, other matches of the 2004–05 Serie A were at the center of the investigation by the Naples Prosecutor's Office.

On 14 May 2006, Moggi announced his resignation as general director of Juventus, as the entire board of directors of Juventus had also done so a few days earlier. On the same day, Lanese suspended himself, while on May 18 the AIA cautiously suspended the nine referees reached by the guarantee notice. On 16 May, the CONI appointed the lawyer Guido Rossi as extraordinary commissioner of the FIGC. In the following weeks, Rossi appointed Francesco Saverio Borrelli as head of the FIGC Investigations Office, Luigi Agnolin as extraordinary commissioner of the AIA, and Cesare Ruperto as president of the FIGC's Federal Appeals Commission.

=== Matches under investigation ===
The nineteen matches of the 2004–05 championship under investigation by the Naples prosecutor were the following:

- Reggina–Juventus 2–1 (6 November 2004)
  Referee: Gianluca Paparesta
- Lecce–Juventus 0–1 (14 November 2004)
  Referee: Massimo De Santis
- Juventus–Lazio 2–1 (5 December 2004)
  Referee: Paolo Dondarini
- Fiorentina–Bologna 1–0 (5 December 2004)
  Referee: Massimo De Santis
- Bologna–Juventus 0–1 (12 December 2004)
  Referee: Tiziano Pieri
- Juventus–Udinese 2–1 (13 February 2005)
  Referee: Pasquale Rodomonti
- ChievoVerona–Lazio 0–1 (20 February 2005)
  Referee: Gianluca Rocchi
- Lazio–Parma 2–0 (27 February 2005)
  Referee: Domenico Messina
- Roma–Juventus 1–2 (5 March 2005)
  Referee: Salvatore Racalbuto
- Inter Milan–Fiorentina 3–2 (20 March 2005)
  Referee: Paolo Bertini
- Fiorentina–Juventus 3–3 (9 April 2005)
  Referee: Pierluigi Collina
- Milan–Brescia 1–1 (10 April 2005)
  Referee: Pasquale Rodomonti
- Bologna–Lazio 1–2 (17 April 2005)
  Referee: Paolo Tagliavento
- Siena–Milan 2–1 (17 April 2005)
  Referee: Pierluigi Collina
- Milan–ChievoVerona 1–0 (20 April 2005)
  Referee: Gianluca Paparesta
- ChievoVerona–Fiorentina 1–2 (8 May 2005)
  Referee: Paolo Dondarini
- Livorno–Siena 3–6 (8 May 2005)
  Referee: Massimo De Santis
- Lazio–Fiorentina 1–1 (22 May 2005)
  Referee: Roberto Rosetti
- Lecce–Parma 3–3 (29 May 2005)
  Referee: Massimo De Santis

=== Sports justice investigations and disciplinary proceedings ===
On 19 June 2006, the head of the FIGC Investigations Office Francesco Saverio Borrelli closed the first part of his investigations, handing the outcome of the investigation to the FIGC's prosecutor Stefano Palazzi. Charges by Palazzi in relation to the first and most important investigation, which involved the companies that in the 2005–06 Serie A championship standings were in a useful position for qualifying for the UEFA European cups in 2006–07, arrived on 22 June. Since the charges had concerned not only members of the Lega Calcio but also FIGC higher-ups and members of the AIA, the first degree sports trial could not be held at the respective disciplinary commissions, as at that time the National Disciplinary Commission (CDN) did not yet exist, and was carried out at the FIGC's Federal Court of Appeal (CAF), the historic body usually called to decide at second instance. The appeal proceedings were consequently held in the FIGC's Federal Court that was usually called into question only for formal defects or to provide opinions and interpretations.

The two proceedings were closed on 14 and 25 July 2006, respectively, making it possible to draw up a definitive standing of the 2005–06 Serie A to determine the Italian clubs qualified for the 2006–07 UEFA Champions League and the 2006–07 UEFA Cup. On the basis of the same standings, after having heard the opinion of a commission of three essays specifically appointed on 26 July 2006, the FIGC issued a press release in which it acknowledged Inter Milan, first classified after the penalties imposed on Juventus and Milan, as the 2005–06 Italian football champion. A second line of investigations involved Reggina and Arezzo, the latter of which was in Serie B at that time. The sports trials related to this further trend closed in August 2006.

=== Appeals ===
Between August 2006 and June 2007, further appeals were discussed before the Conciliation and Arbitration Chamber for Sport, a body established at that time by the CONI. Once all the attempts at conciliation between the parties had failed, the arbitration awards allowed various defendants reduced penalty charges, even considerable ones on the inhibition periods imposed by the FIGC's Federal Court, while some clubs saw reduced penalty points in the standings. Only Arezzo subsequently tried to appeal to the TAR, risking to violate the arbitration clause that prohibited recourse to ordinary justice; the appeal was rejected. The appeal to the TAR was initially also advanced by Juventus even before the arbitration, but it was then controversially withdrawn due to threats from FIFA.

=== Final sanctions ===
The club most affected by sports justice was Juventus, which was found guilty of a type of associative illicit (una fattispecie di illecito associativo), a term that was not envisaged at that time by the Italian sports legal system but was judged by the Federal Court of Justice as a violation of Article 6 of the-then Code of Sports Justice concerning cases of sports illicit, later translated into structured illicit (illecito strutturato). Juventus's title as 2004–05 Italian football champion was put sub judice and de iure revoked, while the club was also not awarded the 2005–06 title, as they were officially relegated to last place in the standings, although the outcome of the 2005–06 season was never under investigation.

Juventus was relegated to Serie B for the first time and also had to suffer a further penalty of points, originally 30 but then reduced to 17 and finally to 9, in the 2006–07 Serie B. Penalties of various entities were also imposed on Fiorentina, Milan, Lazio, Reggina, and Arezzo, to be served in part in the 2005–06 Serie A and in part in the 2007–08 Serie A. Among the defendants, the heaviest penalties hit Moggi and Giraudo, as well as Mazzini, who all received the maximum penalty of five years of inhibition with a proposed ban. This proposal was subsequently accepted by the competent bodies, effectively transforming the sanction into a lifetime ban.

== Criminal trial and sports implications ==
The first degree criminal trial on Calciopoli took place between 2008 and 2011 at the Naples court. During this trial, new wiretaps emerged mainly through the work of Moggi's legal team that had not been considered relevant in the 2006 investigations. The new evidential material involved, among others, the top two executives of Inter Milan at the time of the events, namely the president Giacinto Facchetti, who died in 2006, and the owner Massimo Moratti, who was Inter Milan's majority stakeholder and Facchetti's successor.

In May 2010, Juventus presented a complaint to both CONI and the FIGC asking for the review of the decision to assign Inter Milan the 2005–06 title of Italian football champion. At the same time, the FIGC prosecutor Palazzi had already launched new investigations in this regard, which closed in June 2011 with the complaint of violations of the rules of loyalty, correctness, and probity to various clubs and employee who had not been involved in the 2006 sports trials. The sports illicit was contested at Inter Milan and in the person of Facchetti; however, Palazzi did not proceed to any charges because the facts had by now lapsed due to the statute of limitations.

The FIGC took note of Palazzi's report approving by majority a resolution of the president Giancarlo Abete with which the FIGC's Federal Council declared itself not competent on the application presented by Juventus. The subsequent appeal by Juventus to the National Court of Arbitration for Sport (TNAS), a body that in the meantime had been established by the CONI to replace the Conciliation and Arbitration Chamber for Sport, was also useless; the TNAS also declared itself not competent regarding the revocation of the 2006 championship assigned to Inter Milan. The new wiretaps did not get any effect even in the criminal trial in Naples, which ended in November 2011 with a substantial acceptance of the prosecution; heavy sentences were inflicted in particular on Bergamo, Moggi, and Pairetto, while Giraudo was sentenced in 2009 with a summary judgment.

After the outcome of the Naples trial in the first instance and the declaration of non-competence of the TNAS, Juventus filed an appeal to the TAR against the FIGC and Inter Milan in November 2011, asking for damages of approximately €444 million. According to Juventus's thesis, there was a difference in treatment on the facts of Calciopoli between the events of 2006 and those of 2011. The club also cited the fact that the Naples first instance trial had already excluded their responsibility for the violations committed by its executives. The appeal to the TAR aroused critical reactions from Abete and CONI president Gianni Petrucci, to whom Juventus president Andrea Agnelli replied with the proposal to convene a discussion table to resolve the issue. For a few weeks, the possibility of a peaceful solution to the controversy hovered, as Petrucci convened what was called a peace table for 14 December 2011; however, the meeting did not resolve the controversy, and both Abete and Petrucci had to admit that the positions of the parties were too far apart.

=== Sports trial, July–August 2006 ===
==== Charges ====
According to the indictments, the executives of the clubs involved had relationships with referee designators to influence their team's match designations in order to obtain referees considered favourable. They were often supported or backed up by members of the federation involved in the investigation. Also according to the prosecution, it was common practice to forward recriminations and veiled threats against the referees considered unfavourable through the referee designators or the FIGC. The violations that the FIGC prosecutor Palazzi contested against the accused ranged from the violation of the rules of loyalty, fairness, and sports probity (Article 1 of the Sports Justice Code in force at that time) to sports offenses (Article 6 of the same code). Among the prominent names involved were Moggi and Giraudo for Juventus, charged of violating both Article 1 and Article 6; the brothers Della Valle for Fiorentina, charged of violating Article 6; Lotito for Lazio, accused of violating Article 6; Adriano Galliani, charged of violating Article 1, and Meani, charged of violating both Article 1 and Article 6, for Milan; and Pasquale Foti for Reggina, accused of violating both Article 1 and Article 6. Bergamo and Pairetto, the two CAN referee designators, were also involved in the scandal, as were several referees, such as Bertini, De Santis, Dondarini, Messina, Paparesta, Rocchi, Rodomonti, and Tagliavento. FIGC higher-ups, among them president Carraro and vice-president Mazzini, and Lanese were also charged.

In regards to the clubs, Juventus was charged of having had direct responsibility in the violation of Article 2, Article 6, and Article 9 of the old Code of Sports Justice; Fiorentina was charged of having violated Article 2 for objective and direct responsibility, and Article 6; Lazio was charged of direct and presumed responsibility in the violation of Article 6, Article 2, and Article 9; Milan was charged of the violation for direct and objective responsibility of Article 2, and for objective responsibility of Article 6; and Reggina was charged with the violation of Article 6.

==== Indictment requests ====
===== First line of investigation, 4 July 2006 =====
Requests announced on 4 July 2006 in the first instance sports trial at the CAF by the FIGC prosecutor Stefano Palazzi were the following:

Clubs

- Juventus: exclusion from Serie A and relegation to Serie C1 with 6 penalty points, revocation of the 2004–05 title, and non-assignment of the 2005–06 title
- Fiorentina: relegation to Serie B with 15 penalty points
- Lazio: relegation to Serie B with 15 penalty points
- Milan: relegation to Serie B with 3 penalty points

Club executives

- Antonio Giraudo (Juventus CEO): 5 years with proposed ban
- Luciano Moggi (Juventus general director): 5 years with proposed ban
- Diego Della Valle (Fiorentina owner): 5 years with proposed ban
- Andrea Della Valle (Fiorentina president): 5 years with proposed ban
- Claudio Lotito (Lazio president): 5 years with proposed ban
- Leonardo Meani (Milan employee): 5 years with proposed ban
- Sandro Mencucci (Fiorentina executive): 5 years with proposed ban
- Adriano Galliani (Milan vice-president and CEO, and LNP president): 2 years

Referees and referee assistants

- Paolo Bertini: 5 years with proposed ban
- Massimo De Santis: 5 years with proposed ban
- Paolo Dondarini: 5 years with proposed ban
- Domenico Messina: 5 years with proposed ban
- Pasquale Rodomonti: 5 years with proposed ban
- Gianluca Rocchi: 5 years with proposed ban
- Paolo Tagliavento: 5 years with proposed ban
- Duccio Baglioni (referee assistant): 3 years
- Gianluca Paparesta: 1 year
- Fabrizio Babini (referee assistant): 1 year
- Claudio Puglisi (referee assistant): 1 year

Referees and FIGC executives

- Paolo Bergamo (referee designator): 5 years with proposed ban
- Franco Carraro (FIGC president): 5 years with proposed ban
- Innocenzo Mazzini (FIGC vice president): 5 years with proposed ban
- Tullio Lanese (AIA president): 5 years with proposed ban
- Pierluigi Pairetto (referee designator): 5 years with proposed ban
- Gennaro Mazzei (referee assistant designator): 2 years
- Pietro Ingargiola (pitch commissioner): 1 year

===== Second line of investigation, 8–9 August 2006 =====
Requests announced on 8–9 August 2006 in the first instance sports trial at the CAF by the prosecutor Palazzi were the following:

Clubs

- Reggina: relegation to Serie B with 15 penalty points
- Arezzo: relegation to Serie C1 with 3 penalty points

Club executives

- Pasquale Foti (Reggina president): 5 years with proposed ban
- Leonardo Meani (Milan employee): 3 years

Referees and referee assistants

- Stefano Titomanlio (referee assistant): 3 years
- Paolo Dondarini: 6 months
- Tiziano Pieri: 6 months

Referee executives

- Gennaro Mazzei (referee assistant designator): 3 years

=== Judgments of first instance (Federal Appeals Commission) ===
==== First line of investigations, 14 July 2006 ====
The first line of investigations was pronounced on 14 July 2006 and sanctioned the following:

Clubs

- Juventus: relegation to Serie B with 30 penalty points, revocation of the 2004–05 championship, non-assignment of the 2005–06 championship, and €80,000 fine
- Fiorentina: relegation to Serie B with 12 penalty points and €50,000 fine
- Lazio: relegation to Serie B with 7 penalty points and €40,000 fine
- Milan: 44 penalty points in the 2005–06 championship, 15 penalty points in the 2006–07 championship, and €30,000 fine

Club executives

- Antonio Giraudo (Juventus CEO): 5 years with ban request and €20,000 fine
- Luciano Moggi (Juventus general director): 5 years with ban request and €50,000 fine
- Diego Della Valle (Fiorentina owner): 4 years and €30,000 fine
- Andrea Della Valle (Fiorentina president): 3 years and 6 months and €20,000 fine
- Claudio Lotito (Lazio president): 3 years and 6 months and €10,000 fine
- Leonardo Meani (Milan employee): 3 years and 6 months
- Sandro Mencucci (Fiorentina executive): 3 years and 6 months
- Adriano Galliani (Milan vice-president and CEO, and LNP president): 1 year

Referees

- Massimo De Santis: 4 years and 6 months
- Paolo Dondarini: 3 years and 6 months
- Gianluca Paparesta: 9 months
- Paolo Bertini: acquitted
- Domenico Messina: acquitted
- Gianluca Rocchi: acquitted
- Pasquale Rodomonti: the CAF declared itself not competent
- Paolo Tagliavento: acquitted

Referee assistants

- Fabrizio Babini: 1 year
- Claudio Puglisi: 1 year
- Duccio Baglioni: acquitted

Referee designators and FIGC executives

- Innocenzo Mazzini (FIGC vice-president): 5 years with ban request
- Franco Carraro (FIGC president): 4 years and 6 months
- Tullio Lanese (AIA president): 2 years and 6 months
- Pierluigi Pairetto (referee designator): 2 years and 6 months
- Gennaro Mazzei (assistant referee designator): 1 year
- Pietro Ingargiola (pitch commissioner): admonished
- Paolo Bergamo (referee designator): not judged because he resigned

==== Second line of investigations, 16 August 2006 ====
The second sentence was pronounced on 16 August 2006 and sanctioned the following:

Clubs

- Reggina: 15 penalty points in the 2006–07 championship and €100,000 fine
- Arezzo: 9 penalty points in the 2006–07 championship

Club executives

- Leonardo Meani (Milan employee): 3 years and €30,000 fine
- Pasquale Foti (Reggina president): 2 years and 6 months, and €30,000 fine to be paid to Milan

Referees

- Paolo Dondarini: acquitted
- Tiziano Pieri: acquitted

AIA members

- Gennaro Mazzei (referee assistant designator): 3 years
- Stefano Titomanlio (referee assistant): 3 years

=== Appeal judgments (FIGC's Federal Court of Appeal) ===
==== First line of investigations, 25 July 2006 ====
The CAF issued its appeal ruling on 25 July 2006 with the following results:

Clubs

- Juventus: relegation to Serie B with 17 penalty points, revocation of the 2004–05 title, non-assignment of the 2005–06 title, €120,000 fine, and pitch disqualification (3 rounds)
- Fiorentina: 30 penalty points in the 2005–06 championship, 19 penalty points in the 2006–07 championship, €100,000 fine, and three rounds of disqualification of their own pitch
- Lazio: 30 penalty points in the 2005–06 championship, 11 penalty points in the 2006–07 championship, €100,000 fine, and two rounds of disqualification of their own pitch
- Milan: 30 penalty points in the 2005–06 championship, 8 penalty points in the 2006–07 championship, €100,000 fine, and one-round disqualification of their own pitch

Club executives

- Antonio Giraudo (Juventus CEO): 5 years with ban request
- Luciano Moggi (Juventus general director): 5 years with ban request
- Diego Della Valle (Fiorentina owner): 3 years and 9 months
- Andrea Della Valle (Fiorentina president): 3 years
- Claudio Lotito (Lazio president): 2 years and 6 months
- Leonardo Meani (Milan employee): 2 years and 6 months
- Sandro Mencucci (Fiorentina executive): 2 years and 6 months
- Adriano Galliani (Milan vice-president and CEO, and LNP president): 9 months

Referees

- Massimo De Santis: 4 years
- Gianluca Paparesta: 3 months
- Paolo Bertini: acquitted
- Paolo Dondarini: acquitted
- Paolo Tagliavento: acquitted
- Gianluca Rocchi: acquitted
- Pasquale Rodomonti: not to be judged

Referee assistants

- Fabrizio Babini: 3 months
- Claudio Puglisi: 3 months
- Duccio Baglioni: acquitted

Referee designators and FIGC executives

- Innocenzo Mazzini (FIGC vice-president): 5 years with ban request
- Pierluigi Pairetto (referee designator): 3 years and 6 months
- Tullio Lanese (AIA president): 2 years and 6 months
- Gennaro Mazzei (referee assistant designator): 6 months
- Franco Carraro (FIGC president): €80,000 fine with warning
- Pietro Ingargiola (pitch commissioner): reprimanded

In July 2006, the 2005–06 Serie A championship was awarded to Inter Milan, as the FIGC accepted the opinion of the commission known as "The Three Sages" (composed of Gerhard Aigner, former secretary general of the UEFA; Massimo Coccia, lawyer and sports law expert; and Roberto Pardolesi, professor of comparative private law), which was created by Guido Rossi, the FIGC's extraordinary commissioner, to settle the issue after the non-assignment of the title to Juventus.

==== Second line of investigations, 26 August 2006 ====
The second line of investigations was pronounced on 26 August 2006 and sanctioned the following:

Clubs

- Reggina: 15 penalty points in the 2006–07 championship and €100,000 fine
- Arezzo: 6 penalty points in the 2006–07 championship

Club executives

- Leonardo Meani (Milan employee): 3 years and €30,000 fine to be paid to Milan
- Pasquale Foti (Reggina president): 2 years and 6 months, and €30,000 fine

Referees

- Paolo Dondarini: acquitted
- Tiziano Pieri: acquitted

AIA members

- Gennaro Mazzei (referee assistant designator): 3 years
- Stefano Titomanlio (referee assistant): 3 years

=== Final judgments (CONI Sports Conciliation and Arbitration Chamber) ===
Following the heavy penalties imposed by the FIGC's Federal Court of Justice, which was the last instance of judgment within the FIGC, all the clubs and defendants filed an appeal to the Conciliation and Arbitration Chamber established at CONI. As no conciliation was reached, an arbitration committee had to be set up on a case-by-case basis. Pending the clarification of the disputes, the FIGC suspended the accessory penalties, such as fines and disqualifications of the pitch; Carraro was acquitted by the arbitration. At first, the management of Juventus alone had instead filed an appeal with the TAR, thereby risking sanctions by the FIGC for violation of the arbitration clause that prohibited complaints to the ordinary courts: the request was the reassignment in Serie A (with a maximum penalty of 20 points) and the return of the two championships in question to the club. This request was based on the disproportion between the penalty inflicted on Juventus and those inflicted on the other clubs involved, a disproportion that had been quantified by the club's lawyers, after an assessment of the economic damage caused by the relegation, at €130 million. Through a letter, FIGC extraordinary commissioner Rossi distanced himself from the decisions of the club and announced with CONI a request for compensation against Juventus for having damaged the image of Italian football. Subsequently, Juventus's board of directors decided to withdraw the appeal to the TAR, avoiding a possible postponement of the start of the 2006–07 Serie A and Serie B championships, in order to try to obtain a reduction in the penalty in sports arbitration.

The reverse of the Juventus management was controversial due to the threats by FIFA president Joseph Blatter to exclude the entire FIGC from all international club and national team competitions for five years; the international regulations provided that if a club had resorted to an ordinary court, and the federation to which they belong had not prevented it, the latter would have been excluded from all foreign competitions. While the sanctions against the clubs's executives were issued on various dates in December 2006–June 2007, the CONI Chamber of Conciliation and Arbitration issued the definitive sanctions against the four clubs involved in the first line of investigations on 27 October 2006, and those of Arezzo and Reggina on 12 December 2006.

Clubs

- Juventus: revocation of the 2004–05 title of Italian football champion (confirmed), non-assignment of the 2005–06 title of Italian football champion (confirmed), relegation to last place in the 2005–06 Serie A (confirmed), and 9 points penalty in the 2006–07 Series B (instead of the 17 imposed by the CAF)
- Fiorentina: 30 penalty points in 2005–06 Serie A (confirmed) and 15 penalty points in the 2006–07 Serie A (instead of the 19 imposed by the CAF)
- Milan: 30 penalty points in 2005–06 Serie A (confirmed) and 8 penalty points in 2006–07 Serie A (confirmed)
- Lazio: 30 penalty points in 2005–06 Serie A (confirmed) and 3 penalty points in 2006–07 Serie A (instead of the 11 imposed by the CAF)
- Reggina: 11 penalty points in 2006–07 Serie A (instead of the 15 imposed by the CAF) and €100,000 fine (confirmed)
- Arezzo: 6 penalty points in the 2006–07 Serie B (confirmed)

Club executives

- Claudio Lotito (11 December 2006): 4 months (against 2 years and 6 months in the sentence of the CAF)
- Adriano Galliani (18 December 2006): 5 months (against 9 months in the sentence of the CAF)
- Luciano Moggi (7 March 2007): confirmed the 5 years with proposed ban (CONI declared itself incompetent, as Moggi was no longer a FIGC member)
- Diego Della Valle (27 March 2007): 8 months (against 3 years and 9 months in the sentence of the CAF)
- Andrea Della Valle (27 March 2007): 1 year and 1 month (compared to 3 years in the sentence of the CAF)
- Sandro Mencucci (27 March 2007): 1 year and 5 months (against 2 years and 6 months in the sentence of the CAF)
- Antonio Giraudo (28 May 2007): confirmed the 5 years with proposed ban (CONI declared itself incompetent)
- Leonardo Meani (28 May 2007): 2 years and 2 months (against 2 years and 6 months in the sentence of the CAF)
- Pasquale Foti (5 June 2007): 1 year and 1 month (compared to 2 years and 6 months in the sentence of the CAF)

Referees

- Massimo De Santis (10 May 2007): 4 years confirmed

Referee designators and FIGC executives

- Franco Carraro (8 November 2006): €80,000 fine (fine confirmed but notice removed)
- Pierluigi Pairetto (28 March 2007): 2 years and 6 months (against 3 years and 6 months in the sentence of the CAF)
- Innocenzo Mazzini (12 April 2007): 5 years confirmed with proposed ban
- Tullio Lanese (6 July 2007): 1 year (against 2 years and 6 months in the sentence of the CAF)
- Gennaro Mazzei (11 June 2007): 2 years (against 3 years in the sentence of the CAF)

=== Lifetime bans ===
On 15 June 2011, more than four years after the final rulings of the CONI arbitration, the CDN of the FIGC accepted the requests of a lifetime ban for Giraudo, Mazzini, and Moggi, who a month later would have finished serving the five-year ban. The long timing was due to the changes in the meantime in the FIGC's statute, not without controversy, which had transferred the power to decide on the requests for foreclosure from the FIGC president to the CDN. The lifetime ban, defined as the "foreclosure to stay in any rank and category of the FIGC", was also confirmed in the subsequent stages of judgment on 9 July 2011 by the FIGC's Federal Court of Justice, and on 4 April 2012 by the High Court of Sports Justice established at the CONI. On 3 August 2012, the III Section of the TAR rejected the instance with which Moggi requested the suspension of the provision of the CONI High Court of Justice.

=== Situation after the CONI ruling ===
Following the rulings, the accepted clubs and relative point-deductions for the Serie A and Serie B championships in the 2006–07 season were as follows:

Serie A

- Ascoli
- Atalanta
- Cagliari
- Catania
- ChievoVerona (2006–07 UEFA Champions League)
- Empoli
- Fiorentina (–15 points)
- Inter Milan (2006–07 UEFA Champions League)
- Lazio (–3 points)
- Livorno (2006–07 UEFA Cup)
- Messina
- Milan (–8 points, 2006–07 UEFA Champions League)
- Palermo (2006–07 UEFA Cup)
- Parma (2006–07 UEFA Cup)
- Reggina (–1 points)
- Roma (2006–07 UEFA Champions League)
- Sampdoria
- Siena (–1 point)
- Torino
- Udinese

Serie B

- AlbinoLeffe
- Arezzo (–6 points)
- Bari
- Bologna
- Brescia
- Cesena
- Crotone
- Frosinone
- Genoa
- Hellas Verona
- Juventus (–9 points)
- Lecce
- Mantova
- Modena
- Napoli
- Pescara (–1 point)
- Piacenza
- Rimini
- Spezia
- Treviso
- Triestina (–1 point)
- Vicenza

=== Consequences of sports sanctions ===
Without the 15 penalty points, Fiorentina would have finished the season in third place instead of sixth and would have qualified for the 2006–07 UEFA Champions League qualifying rounds ahead of Milan (fourth with 69 points without –8) and Lazio, which started with –11 and remained –3 after the sentence of CONI, would have played in the UEFA Cup. Without the 11 penalty points, Reggina would have finished the championship in eighth place; the club had started from –15 but had a reduced penalty of four points due to the CONI ruling during the championship. Without those four removed penalty points, Reggina would have been relegated to Serie B in place of ChievoVerona. Without the 6 penalty points, Arezzo would have finished in mid-table, while Spezia would have been directly relegated Lega Pro Prima Divisione, with Hellas Verona and Cesena playing in the playout. For Juventus, relegation to Serie B was the first in its history. The mathematical return to Serie A took place on 19 May 2007 after defeating Arezzo 5–1 away on the fourth last day of the championship. The 30 penalty points did not affect Milan's qualification for the 2006–07 Champions League, which they would go on to win, even though they had to play the summer qualifying rounds; UEFA had expressed many doubts about the possibility of involving a club involved in a scandal in an international competition.

== Calciopoli bis ==
=== New wiretaps investigation and Juventus's appeals to sports justice ===
Between 2010 and 2011, the FIGC's prosecutor Palazzi carried out new investigations relating to the further wiretaps that emerged during the criminal proceedings underway at the Naples court and deemed irrelevant in the 2006 sports trial. On 10 May 2010, in light of the new evidential material, Juventus presented an application to the presidents of CONI and FIGC, the FIGC prosecutor, and the FIGC chief prosecutor to request a review of the decision to assign the title of champion of Italy 2005–06 to Inter Milan and the revocation of the same assignment.

=== Palazzi Report ===
At the end of the investigation, Palazzi sent a report to the FIGC, made public on 1 July 2011, in which charges were contested against various club's employee, many of whom were not involved in the 2006 sports provision. In particular, they were involved in violations of the Article 6 of the then-current Code of Sports Justice (CGS) Inter Milan and Livorno, plus nine other clubs for violations of Article 1 of the CGS, namely Brescia, Cagliari, ChievoVerona, Empoli, Milan, Palermo, Reggina, Udinese, and Vicenza.

In Inter Milan's case, which was the most important from a media standpoint, those involved included the late then-president Facchetti and to a lesser extent the owner Moratti, Facchetti predecessor and successor as president. In his report, Palazzi contested the sports illicit to Facchetti, and to illustrate the reasons for the decision on Juventus's instance, he also assumed that the conduct implemented by the top management of Inter Milan, consisting of "a consolidated network of relationships, of a non-regulatory nature, aimed at altering the principles of impartiality, impartiality, and independence of the refereeing sector", had violated Articles 1 and 6 of the old CGS, as they were "certainly aimed at ensuring an advantage in the standings". At the same time, Palazzi cited the statute of limitations for all the violations contested both to Inter Milan and to the other subjects under investigation, including presidents (Massimo Cellino of Cagliari, Luca Campedelli of ChievoVerona, and Fabrizio Corsi of Empoli), executives (Rino Foschi of Palermo and Sergio Gasparin of Vicenza), collaborators (Nello Governato, ex-Brescia and Lazio), and coaches (Luciano Spalletti of Udinese), and consequently the impossibility of ascertaining the facts in a trial.

=== Lack of jurisdiction of sports justice ===
On 18 July 2011, as a consequence of the statute of limitations of the alleged illecits charged to Inter Milan on 4 July 2011, the FIGC's Federal Council approved by majority a resolution of the president Abete and rejected, due to lack of legal conditions, the request revocation of the scudetto presented by Juventus; in the circumstance, Abete said that he would have preferred to see Inter Milan renounce the statute of limitations, a possibility also made explicit by the prosecutor Palazzi in his report. During the Federal Council, a message was also read from Rossi, the former FIGC commissioner, who explained how at the time of the assignment of the 2005–06 championship to Inter Milan, the FIGC could not have been aware of the wiretaps concerning the club's management, which came to light after the Naples trial.

Andrea Agnelli, who in the meantime had risen to the presidency of Juventus since May 2010, criticized the FIGC's failure to take a position, accusing it of "unequal treatment" in similar situations, and on 10 August he announced an appeal to the TNAS against the Federal Council's resolution. Agnelli also said that his club was ready to pursue the path of ordinary justice if they were not satisfied by the CONI justice body. In the following months, the TNAS admitted in two distinct moments its incompetence on the appeal presented by Juventus; on 9 September 2011, although the court declared itself competent to decide on part of the appeal, its president Alberto De Roberto affirmed the lack of competence regarding the economic request for damages. On 15 November 2011, the arbitration panel, having acquired the briefs of Juventus and the FIGC and Inter Milan counterparts, declared the non-competence of the TNAS on the resolution of the Federal Council of 18 July 2011.

On 12 January 2019, Juventus filed an appeal with the Sports Guarantee College, a body of CONI, asking for the annulment of the award with which the TNAS had declared itself incompetent to decide on the application presented by Juventus against the failure to revoke the 2005–06 championship; on 6 May 2019, the body declared this appeal non-admissible and CONI excluded from formulating a judgment on the matter. On 11 July 2019, the FIGC's Federal National Court further rejected the suspension motion filed by Juventus and declared the club's appeal against the non-revocation of the 2005–06 title to be non-admissible, once it was established that this procedure was identical to the one already filed before the College of Guarantee; it also established how the matter relating to the awarding of the aforementioned championship was to be considered concluded with the sports judiciary, having reached the end of its procedural procedure. On 6 August 2019, the Federal Court of Appeal rejected Juventus's appeal against the rejection of the application for suspension and the declaration of inadmissibility issued by the TFN in the previous July; a subsequent appeal aimed at challenging the latter decision, presented by Juventus at the College of Guarantee, was declared non-admissible on 6 November 2019. On 8 January 2020, the CONI College of Guarantee declared the appeal of Juventus to not be admissible, exhausting all the levels of judgment and sanctioning the de facto end of the dispute in the sports justice system.

=== Peace table and Juventus's appeals to ordinary justice ===
On 14 November 2011, in regards to the compensation for the damages that would have been caused by the difference in treatment between the events of 2006 and those of 2011, Juventus filed an appeal against the FIGC and Inter Milan at the TAR, also based on the first degree criminal sentence of Naples, which inflicted heavy sentences on Moggi and Giraudo but excluded direct and objective responsibilities of the club. The alleged damage suffered was quantified by Juventus at around €443 million. The appeal to the administrative court aroused the critical reactions of FIGC president Giancarlo Abete and CONI president Gianni Petrucci, the latter of whom spoke, without directly mentioning Juventus, of legal doping.

In a press conference on 16 November 2011, Juventus president Andrea Agnelli proposed to Petrucci to convene a discussion table between the parties to settle the issue. Petrucci welcomed the proposal, which was already made in the summer by Fiorentina president Diego Della Valle, calling for what was billed "the table of peace" on 14 December 2011. The hopes for a peaceful solution to the controversy were disregarded, as the peace table, which was attended by Agnelli, Moratti, Galliani, Della Valle, and Napoli president Aurelio De Laurentiis, in addition to Petrucci and Abete themselves, CONI secretary general Raffaele Pagnozzi, and FIGC vice-president Antonello Valentini, resolved in a meeting lasting 4 hours and 36 minutes, at the end of which Petrucci and Abete had to admit that the positions had remained distant and that the injuries of Calciopoli were far from healed. In the days following the peace table, it was reported regarding the lack of agreement between the parties on the drafting of a document that would have described Calciopoli as having made summary justice, which was agreed by many but not all the parties, and was recorded the personal initiative of Della Valle, who filed a complaint against the former FIGC extraordinary commissioner Guido Rossi. On 10 February 2012, Juventus challenged the TNAS arbitration award of 15 November 2011 before the Court of Appeal of Rome, bringing before ordinary justice also the failure to revoke the 2005–06 championship.

The rulings came after almost five years, and they were both negative for Juventus, as the sentence of 18 July 2016 by the TAR rejected the claim for damages against FIGC and Inter Milan. On 22 November 2016, the Court of Appeal of Rome also rejected the request for Inter Milan's revocation of the 2005–06 championship. In both cases, the reasons were not legal but technical, and the TAR made it clear that it could not rule on a matter for which Juventus had already presented and then withdrew an appeal to the TAR itself in 2006, implicitly accepting the final judgments of the Conciliation and Arbitration Chamber of CONI, while the Court of Appeal declared its incompetence in the matter of assigning and revoking sports titles. In October 2016, Juventus appealed the TAR ruling before the Council of State, updating the claim for damages against the FIGC and Inter Milan to €581 million. On 13 December 2018, the Court of Cassation rejected the appeal of Juventus against the decision of the Court of Appeal of Rome on the basis of the "principle of autonomy of the national sports system", sanctioning de facto the end of the dispute linked to the assignment of the 2005–06 championship in the ordinary justice system.

== Criminal trials ==
Two criminal proceedings originated from the 2006 scandal: the one concerning Calciopoli proper at the court of Naples and the one concerning the sports attorney agency GEA World at the court of Rome. A third line of investigations, disclosed in the same period by the public prosecutor of Udine and concerning illegal sports betting with the alleged involvement of footballers, including the Juventus and national goalkeeper Gianluigi Buffon, ended with the acquittal of all the suspects.

As all three three contemporary scandals in May 2006 involved more or less directly Juventus (Luciano Moggi and his son Alessandro were involved in the investigation into the GEA, as well as Davide Lippi, son of the then coach of the national team Marcello Lippi, former Juventus coach), newspapers and televisions asked more or less explicitly the removal of Lippi and Juventus players (in particular Buffon, Fabio Cannavaro, and Alessandro Del Piero) before the 2006 FIFA World Cup that would later be won by Italy, also thanks to the many Juventus's players. All this greatly affected public opinion on the eve of the World Cup in Germany.

=== GEA World process ===
In November 2008, Luciano and his son Alessandro, along with Davide Lippi, Franco Zavaglia, Francesco Ceravolo, and Pasquale Gallo, were involved in the GEA trial in Rome. The accusation was that of association for delinquency (associazione per delinquere, a specific crime envisaged by Article 416 of the Italian Penal Code) and private violence (violenza privata, a specific crime envisaged by Article 610 of the Italian Penal Code that is similar to duress, concerned only the Moggis) and the prosecutors Luca Palamara and Maria Cristina Palaia at the conclusion of the investigations carried out by Colonel Giuseppe Magliocco of the Guardia di Finanza of Rome had 6 and 5 years of imprisonment required for Luciano and Alessandro Moggi, respectively, and from 1 to 2 years for all the others.

On 8 January 2009, the first degree ruling sentenced Luciano and Alessandro Moggi to 1 year and 6 months and 1 year and 2 months in prison, respectively, while the other four defendants were acquitted, as the accusation had fallen of conspiracy that concerned everyone, only that of private violence against the players Manuele Blasi and Nicola Amoruso remained standing.

On 25 March 2011, the second degree ruling from the first criminal section of the Court of Appeal of Rome reduced the sentences for Luciano (one year of imprisonment for private violence) and Alessandro Moggi (5 months of imprisonment for attempted violence private), while the acquittals already decided at first instance for the other defendants were also confirmed. The penalty reductions for the Moggi family derived from the statute of limitations relating to the power of attorney of Amoruso. Luciano Moggi was sentenced to pay approximately €10,000 in court costs and to compensate the civil party of Stefano Antonelli separately and the FIGC for damages. Matteo Melandri, lawyer of Luciano Moggi, announced the appeal to the Supreme Court.

At a sports level, the FIGC did not open an investigation into the GEA and consequently no disciplinary measures have been taken regarding this matter. The trial at GEA World ended on 15 January 2014 with the confirmation of the acquittal sentence issued in the two previous stages of the ordinary trial of the company from the accusation of criminal association and the annulment "for incorrect application of the law" without postponement for the statute of limitations of the verdict of sentence in second degree to Luciano and Alessandro Moggi for private violence.

=== Naples trial ===
The Naples trial began in autumn 2008 for the accused who had chosen the shortened procedure, including Antonio Giraudo and Tullio Lanese, and in January 2009 for all the others. The most serious charge was that of criminal association aimed at sports fraud. On 24 March 2009, the judges confirmed Naples as the site of the trial, ousting all the civil parties, including a Roman publishing company that had printed over a million stickers on the assumption that the championship had been lawfully won. On 14 December 2009, the rulings relating to the accused who had chosen the shortened procedure were issued and there were four sentences: 3 years of imprisonment for Giraudo, 2 years and 4 months for former referee Tiziano Pieri (later acquitted in the second degree of judgment), and 2 years each for the other former referee Paolo Dondarini and for Lanese. Seven defendants were acquitted: the referee Gianluca Rocchi and the former referees Stefano Cassarà, Marco Gabriele, and Domenico Messina, as well as the former referee assistants Duccio Baglioni, Giuseppe Foschetti, and Alessandro Griselli.

The trial with ordinary rite ended on 8 November 2011 with the conviction of sixteen other defendants: 5 years and 4 months of imprisonment for promoting the criminal association for Luciano Moggi, who also received a five-year ban of access to sports events, known as DASPO, and a lifetime ban from public offices), 3 years and 8 months for the former referee designator Paolo Bergamo (plus 5 years of ban from public offices), 2 years and 2 months for the former FIGC vice-president Innocenzo Mazzini (the latter two were also found guilty of promoting the association), 1 year and 11 months each for the other former referee designator Pierluigi Pairetto and for former referee Massimo De Santis, 1 year and 8 months for the other former referee Salvatore Racalbuto, 1 year and 6 months (plus a €30,000 fine) for Reggina president Pasquale Foti, 1 year and 5 months each for former referees Paolo Bertini and Antonio Dattilo, 1 year and 3 months each (plus a €25,000 fine) for executives Claudio Lotito (president of Lazio), Andrea and Diego Della Valle (former president and owner of Fiorentina, respectively), and Sandro Mencucci (CEO of Fiorentina), 1 year each (plus a €20,000 fine) for the former Milan collaborator Leonardo Meani, who as also the official companion of referees, as well as former assistant referees Claudio Puglisi and Stefano Titomanlio. Eight defendants were acquitted: the former Messina sporting director Mariano Fabiani, former referee Pasquale Rodomonti, former referee assistants Marcello Ambrosino, Silvio Gemignani, and Enrico Cennicola, former referee assistant designator Gennaro Mazzei, former CAN secretary Maria Grazia Fazi, and former RAI journalist Ignazio Scardina. It excluded all claims for damages against Juventus, cited in the trial as a civil party, as the court considered the club to not be objectively or civilly liable in the affair. On 14 November 2011, on the basis of the ruling and the contemporaneous developments of its appeal to the TNAS against the failure to revoke the 2005–06 championship from Inter Milan, Juventus announced the appeal to the TAR against the FIGC and Inter Milan to receive compensation for the damage suffered by the 2006 sports judgments.

The appeal process for the defendants who chose the shortened procedure ended on 5 December 2012 with the rulings for Giraudo to 1 year and 8 months of imprisonment for criminal association aimed at sports fraud and the acquittal of the other defendants: Pieri, who renounced the statute of limitations, Dondarini, and Lanese, as well as those who had already been acquitted in the first instance and for whom the prosecution had challenged the sentence.

On 17 December 2013, Moggi was sentenced in second instance to 2 years and 4 months of imprisonment, while Pairetto and Mazzini were sentenced to 2 years each for being the promoters of the criminal association, while the episodes of sports fraud for which they were accused have been declared extinguished due to the statute of limitations. Bertini, Dattilo, and De Santis waived the statute of limitations: the first was sentenced to 1 year in prison, and the other two to 10 months. In regards to the Della Valle brothers, Foti, Lotito, Meani, Mencucci, Puglisi, Racalbuto, and Titomanlio, the statute of limitations for the crimes charged to them was declared. The appeals of the public prosecutor against Fabiani and Mazzei were accepted for criminal association and for an episode of sports fraud, respectively, but their illicits have been declared extinguished due to the statute of limitations. The acquittals of Fazi, Rodomonti, and Scardina were confirmed. For Bergamo, the Court of Appeal annulled the previous conviction and ordered the conduct of a new judicial proceeding, as the right of defence was violated (the request for legitimate impediment presented by her lawyer Morescanti when she was pregnant was rejected) but the new trial was not disputed due to the statute of limitations. The Court of Appeal also ruled that in the affair no direct damages emerged against Atalanta, Bologna, Brescia, Lecce, and the financial company Victoria 2000 (at that time owner of Bologna), all their requests for damage due to the fact that no match in the 2004–05 championship was altered by non-football episodes, confirming the extraneousness of Juventus, which was alleged by the aforementioned clubs to have been responsible for the damage they suffered, both objectively and civilly in the affair, as already sanctioned in the trial at first instance.

On 24 March 2015, the Court of Cassation annulled the convictions previously established in the appeal phase regarding the subject of criminal association for Giraudo, Mazzini, Moggi, and Pairetto without referral on appeal due to the statute of limitations of the alleged crimes. In addition, two verdicts linked to the accusation of sports fraud for non-existence of crimes were annulled in Moggi. In regards to most of the charges of sports fraud, which had already been extinguished, their appeal was dismissed. Among those who renounced the statute of limitations, the second degree sentence of De Santis was confirmed (1 year), while the verdicts sentencing Bertini and Dattilo were annulled at the request of the Attorney General for non-existence of the sports fraud they contested in competition with Moggi and for the crime of association. The appeals of the Della Valle brothers, Foti, Lotito, Mazzei, Mencucci, and Racalbuto, whose charges had already been exstinguished on appeal, were rejected. The appeal of the Public Prosecutor's Office against the previous acquittals of Dondarini, Lanese, Pieri, and Rocchi was declared inadmissible. Also rejected were all appeals regarding the claims for damages presented in court by the clubs of Atalanta, Bologna, Brescia, Lecce, and Victoria 2000, confirming the reasons stated in the corresponding verdicts published at the end of the two previous phases.

On 21 July 2015, the Court of Cassation extinguished Giraudo's sentence due to the statute of limitations, as it already happened on 24 March 2015.

=== Sentences in the Supreme Court of Cassation ===
- Tullio Lanese: confirmation of the acquittal verdict in second instance in an abbreviated rite for the crime of criminal conspiracy.
- Paolo Dondarini: confirmation of the acquittal verdict in second instance in shortened rite for the crime of sports fraud.
- Tiziano Pieri: confirmation of the acquittal verdict in second instance in shortened rite for the crimes of criminal conspiracy and sports fraud.
- Gianluca Rocchi: confirmation of the acquittal verdict in second instance in shortened rite for the crime of sports fraud.
- Claudio Lotito: rejection of the appeal against the second degree verdict, as the crime of sports fraud was extinguished due to the statute of limitations in 2012.
- Andrea Della Valle: rejection of the appeal against the second degree verdict, as the crime of sports fraud was extinguished due to the statute of limitations in 2012.
- Diego Della Valle: rejection of the appeal against the second degree verdict, as the crime of sports fraud was extinguished due to the statute of limitations in 2012.
- Sandro Mencucci: rejection of the appeal against the second degree verdict, as the crime of sports fraud was extinguished due to the statute of limitations in 2012.
- Pasquale Foti: rejection of the appeal against the second degree verdict, as the crime of sports fraud was extinguished due to the statute of limitations in 2012.
- Gennaro Mazzei: rejection of the appeal against the second degree verdict, as the crime of sports fraud was extinguished due to the statute of limitations in 2012.
- Salvatore Racalbuto: rejection of the appeal against the second degree verdict, as the crimes of criminal conspiracy and sports fraud were extinguished due to the statute of limitations in 2012.
- Luciano Moggi: annulment of the verdict of conviction in second degree without postponement, as the crimes of sports fraid and criminal conspiracy and sports fraud were extinguished due to the statute of limitations in 2012 and 2014, respectively.
- Antonio Giraudo: annulment of the verdict of conviction in the second degree in an abbreviated rite without postponement, as the crimes of sports fraid and criminal conspiracy and sports fraud were extinguished due to the statute of limitations in 2014.
- Pierluigi Pairetto: annulment of the verdict of conviction in second degree without postponement, as the crimes of sports fraid and criminal conspiracy and sports fraud were extinguished due to the statute of limitations in 2012 and 2014, respectively.
- Innocenzo Mazzini: annulment of the verdict of conviction in the second degree without postponement, as the crimes of sports fraid and criminal conspiracy and sports fraud were extinguished due to the statute of limitations in 2012 and 2014, respectively.
- Massimo De Santis: confirmation of the verdict of sentence in second instance for the crimes of criminal association and sports fraud (sentence of 1 year of imprisonment suspended by the Supreme Court).
- Paolo Bertini: annulment of the verdict of conviction in second instance for the crimes of criminal association and sports fraud for non-existence of the crimes.
- Antonio Dattilo: annulment of the verdict of conviction in the second degree for the crimes of criminal association and sports fraud for non-existence of the crimes.

On 9 September 2015, the motivations for the verdicts were disclosed. According to the Supreme Court, Moggi was "the creator of an illegal system of conditioning the 2004–05 championship matches (and not only them)". For the judges, Moggi committed both the crime of criminal association and that of sports fraud "in favour of the club he belongs to (Juventus)", and also obtained "personal advantages in terms of increasing power (already in itself really considerable without any apparent justification)". From the opinions of Moggi on television and in the media, the judges wrote that "the fate of this or that player, of this or that referee could depend with all the consequences that could derive from it for the football clubs concerned from time to time". According to the Supreme Court, the criminal association directed by Moggi "was widely structured and widespread throughout the territory with the full awareness for individual participants, even in top positions (such as Moggi, Pairetto or Mazzini), to act in view of conditioning the referees through the formation of the grids considered as the first segment of fraudulent conduct."

As for De Santis, the Supreme Court wrote that the telephone records showed the "numerous contacts coinciding with the matches for which he had been designated" between him and Moggi, "proving the very close relationship between the subjection and the complicity that existed between two". As for the relations maintained by the top management of Fiorentina with Moggi, the Supreme Court said that by going "to Canossa" to meet Moggi, the Della Valle brothers and Mencucci "approach the system of power that had marginalized and ultimately damaged them: not therefore with the intention of guaranteeing the impartiality of refereeing decisions to right the alleged wrongs suffered previously (considered to be the basis of the deficient situation in the standings), but a sort of condescension towards a system of power that would guarantee them for the future through prudent referee choices piloted by the power group opecerating in part within the FIGC and Mazzini) and partly extraneous to the institution (Moggi), in perfect symbiosis with each other." With regard to Lotito, the Supreme Court found a "mass of compromising phone calls" and "unequivocal evidence" of the "pressures" he exerted "on the world of refereeing in a context of infighting for the appointment as president of the FIGC between the outgoing Carraro and the aspiring emerging Abete "to ensure the rescue" of Lazio. The Supreme Court also stated that the "preparation of the refereeing grids" was "managed" by Pairetto, together with his colleague Bergamo and "with the participation of Luciano Moggi and Antonio Giraudo".

== Court of Audit sentence ==
On 17 October 2012, the Court of Audit sentenced the referees involved in the scandal to compensate the FIGC on charges of damage to their image for a total of €3.97 million. The conviction involved fourteen people: the heaviest request (€1 million) was for Paolo Bergamo, former referee and referee designator, while the other referee designator Pierluigi Pairetto had to pay €800,000. Former FIGC vice-president Innocenzo Mazzini had to pay €700,000. Among the other penalties, both Massimo De Santis and Tullio Lanese received a €500,000 fine, while Salvatore Racalbuto had to pay a €500,000. Interested parties had the opportunity to appeal. The sentence was confirmed in February 2022.

== Other proceedings ==
In April 2007, a second line of investigation emerged based on the traffic of Swiss SIM cards between Luciano Moggi, Mariano Fabiani, (former Messina sporting director), and some referees concerning the 2004–05 Serie A. At the end of the investigation carried out by the FIGC, Juventus and Messina negotiated and were fined €300,000 (divided into three installments of €100,000 per year) and €60,000 (to be paid to the FIGC), respectively, while the referees involved (Paolo Bertini, Gianluca Paparesta, and Tiziano Pieri) were suspended as a precaution in April 2007 and then for the entire 2007–08 Serie A season, pending clarification of their positions. They were definitively suspended by the AIA in July 2008, while Fabiani was banned for 4 years in August 2008.

In May 2009, the justice of the peace of Lecce acquitted Moggi and referee Massimo De Santis of the charge of sports fraud and match fixing related to the Lecce–Juventus and Lecce–Fiorentina matches of the 2004–05 Serie A, as sanctioned by the sporting judgements. In particular, the judge established that "the fact described has not been proven in any way" and that "the Judge also does not consider the sentences rendered by the sports justice bodies fully usable since the latter judgment is structurally different from the ordinary judgement. Nor is it believed that the telephone interceptions referred to in the course of the proceedings can have probative value, since they cannot be used in a proceeding other than the one in which they are ordered.

In April 2012, the Supreme Court confirmed the disciplinary sanction of censorship against judge Teresa Casoria, president of the Ninth Section of the Court of Naples who had led the criminal branch of Calciopoli, and which had been imposed on her in April 2011 for a series of misconduct against her colleagues while presiding over the hearings of the aforementioned trial.

In 2015, the Milan court expressed itself in a libel trial concerning the Calciopoli events, brought by the Facchetti family against Moggi, who had publicly accused the late and then-Inter Milan president Giacinto Facchetti "of having also requested and obtained special treatment in the refereeing of Inter Milan's matches". The judge dismissed the lawsuit and acquitted Moggi, finding "with certainty a good truthfulness" in his statements and citing the existence of "a sort of lobbying intervention on the part of the-then president of Inter Milan towards the referee class ... , significant of a relationship of a friendly [and] preferential type, [with] heights that are not properly commendable." The sentence was upheld on appeal in 2018, and passed judgment in 2019.

In January 2019, the Naples Court of Appeal rejected the appeals for damages brought by Bologna through the parent company Victoria 2000 and by Brescia for unjust downgrading in the 2004–05 season; the judge ruled that there was no proof that the two teams were relegated due to any alleged wrongdoing.

In February 2021, the statute of limitations put an end to the trial against 23 Fiorentina fans who in July 2006, in protest against the sentence of the sports judge that condemned Fiorentina to relegation to Serie B, together with other 3,000 supporters, had occupied the tracks of the Florence–Rome line causing negative repercussions to national rail traffic; the accusation, with a first degree conviction in May 2014, was for interruption of public service.

In November 2021, the Supreme Court confirmed the sentence against RAI to compensate the relatives of sports journalist Oliviero Beha with €180,000 for having subjected him to demotion between 2008 and 2010 due to his critical positions on the Calciopoli criminal trial.

In February 2022, the Naples Court of Appeal established the right of the FIGC to be compensated economically by the convicts of the Calciopoli sports and criminal trials, as they were a civil party against them. The FIGC was to collect €200,000 from each Calciopoli convict.
