= UEFA competitions =

Set of international tournaments organised by UEFA

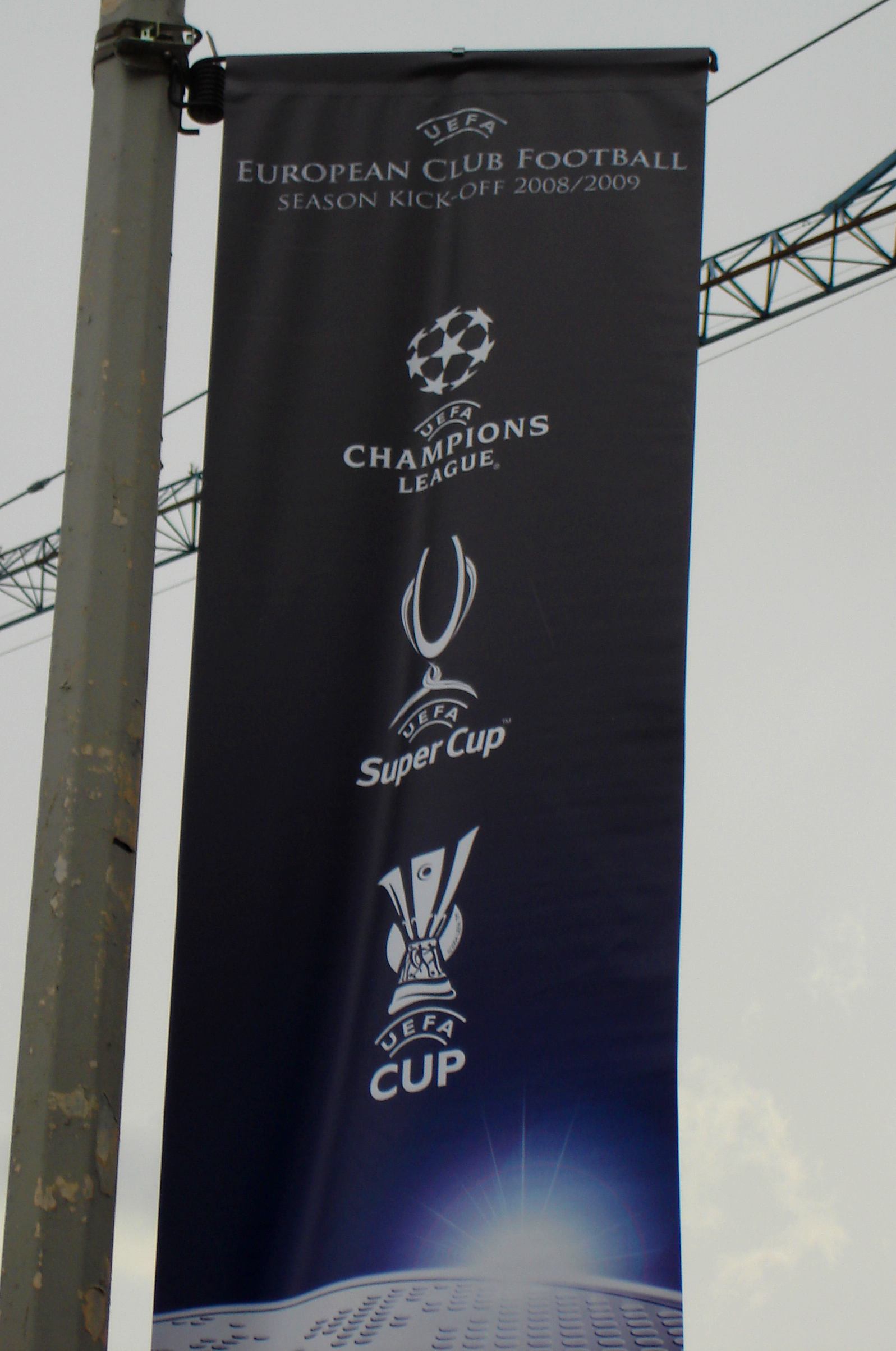
Flag showing the Champions League, the Super Cup and the UEFA Cup logos at Monaco (2008).

UEFA competitions (French: compétitions de l'UEFA), referred improperly by the mass media as European football, are the set of tournaments organised by the Union of European Football Associations (UEFA), generally in professional and amateur association football and futsal. The term was established in 1971 by the confederation to differentiate the men's football competitions under its administration, the first in history being held at a pan-European stage, from other international competitions carried out in the continent between 1960s and 1990s, such as the Inter-Cities Fairs Cup, International Football Cup and Karl Rappan Cup, Cup of the Alps, Balkans Cup and the restructured Mitropa Cup (as well as some which had already been discontinued by late 1950s such as the Latin Cup). All these tournaments were organised by private bodies and/or at least two national associations and concerning one of more regional areas of Europe, not being recognised by UEFA for historic-statistical purposes.

== History ==
After being recognised by FIFA in 1961 and defined its functions as governing body, UEFA laid down principles for the authorisation of other international club competitions, becoming the only organization with legal authority over international football in the continent. For that reason, it considers only results in its own competitions, in general terms and by single tournament, as the only valid for calculating and communicating confederation-level official records and statistics as long as setting combined values in inter-club football.

Until the first UEFA Europa Conference League final in 2022, the only team to have won every men's professional club competition was Juventus of Italy, while France is the sole national side to have won the European/South American Nations Cup, the Nations League and the men's European Championship. The governing body of the latter, French Football Federation (FFF), alongside its Czechoslovak, German, Italian, Soviet and Spanish counterparts in men's football, as well as German Football Association (DFB) in women's variant, is also the only association affilied to UEFA which representative teams have won, at least once, the senior Euro and the continental tournament in all age categories (under 17, under 19 and under 21).

FC Barcelona of Spain became the first women's club to follow its men's team of winning the Champions League, by winning the 2021 Women's Champions League final. The club's men's team won their first title in 1992. The beaten finalists Chelsea of England was also seeking to break that record as well, as its men's team won their maiden in 2012. They were already the first club ever to see its men's and women's teams reach the Champions League final in the same season, having qualified for the Champions League final as well. Barcelona is also the only club in the UEFA zone that has won men's and women's Champions League, the Youth League and the Futsal Champions League among these with active sections which can compete in all these tournaments.

== UEFA sanctioned tournaments ==
=== Active ===
==== For national teams ====
- UEFA European Championship, European football's premier competition, established in 1960.
  - UEFA European Under-21 Championship, established in 1978.
  - UEFA European Under-19 Championship, established in 1948 as an under-18 competition and reorganised in 2002 for the current age group.
  - UEFA European Under-17 Championship, established in 1982 as an under-16 competition and reorganised in 2002 for the current age group.
- UEFA Nations League, established in 2018.
- CONMEBOL–UEFA Cup of Champions (also known as Finalissima), organised jointly with CONMEBOL since 1985 and 1993, rebranded in 2022; the female counterpart of the match was established in 2022.
- UEFA Women's Championship, premier competition for women's national teams, established in 1984.
  - UEFA Women's Under-19 Championship, established in 1997 as an under-18 competition and reorganised in 2002 for the current age group.
  - UEFA Women's Under-17 Championship, established in 2007.
- UEFA Women's Nations League, established in 2022.
- UEFA Futsal Championship, established in 1996.
  - UEFA Under-19 Futsal Championship, established in 2019.
- UEFA Women's Futsal Championship, established in 2018.
- UEFA Regions' Cup, established in 1999.

==== For clubs ====
- UEFA Champions League, European football's premier club competition, established in 1955 as the European Champion Clubs' Cup and reorganised in 1992.
- UEFA Europa League, European football's second football club competition (originally third) established in 1971 as the UEFA Cup and reorganised in 2009.
- UEFA Conference League, European football's third football club competition, established in 2021 as the UEFA Europa Conference League and reorganised in 2024.
- UEFA Super Cup, match between the previous season's winners of the Champions League and the Europa League. Established in 1973 and until 1999 played between the European Champions' Cup and Cup Winners' Cup winners.
- UEFA Youth League, established in 2013.
- UEFA Women's Champions League, Europe's premier women's football club competition, established in 2001 and reorganised in 2009.
- UEFA Women's Europa Cup, founded in 2023, and first played in the 2025/26 season.
- UEFA Futsal Champions League, established in 2001 to replace the Futsal European Clubs Championship.

=== Defunct ===
==== For national teams ====
- UEFA Amateur Cup, organised in 1967, 1970, 1974 and 1978.
- UEFA European Under-23 Championship, organized in 1972, 1974 and 1976.
- UEFA–CAF Meridian Cup (1997–2007), organised jointly with the Confederation of African Football (CAF).
- UEFA Futsal Under-21 Championship, the only edition in 2008.

==== For clubs ====
- UEFA Cup Winners' Cup (1960–1999), formerly European football's second football club competition, disbanded with qualifying clubs being transferred to UEFA Cup in 1999, on only six occasions since then Domestic Cup winners have won the UEFA Cup/Europa League.
- UEFA Intertoto Cup (1961–2008), disbanded with qualifying clubs being transferred to the UEFA Europa League in 2009.
- Intercontinental Cup (1960–2004), organised jointly with the Confederación Sudamericana de Fútbol (CONMEBOL), was rebranded as Toyota European/South American Cup since 1980.

== See also ==
- List of association football competitions

== Notes ==
1. Although the mass media often define "European football" as comprising any international football competitions held exclusively in Europe (often excluding the Intercontinental Cup, held also in South America until 1980 and in Asia since then until 2004, and regarded by them as an inter-club world title since 1960), for UEFA it is "based on a system of domestic competitions and European competitions". UEFA competitions were defined as "complementary" with the national association competitions by the UEFA general secretary Gerhard Aigner in 2009.

== Bibliography ==
- "Vision Europe" (PDF). Nyon: Union des Associations Européennes de Football. April 2005. Archived (PDF) from the original on 21 March 2006.
- Vieli, André (2014). UEFA: 60 years at the heart of football (PDF). Nyon: Union des Associations Européennes de Football. doi:10.22005/bcu.175315. Archived (PDF) from the original on 3 August 2021.
