= Guido Rossi =

Italian jurist, laweyer, and politician (1931–2017)

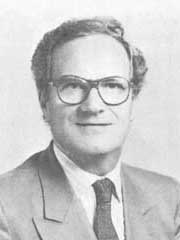
- Rossi in 1987

Member of the Senate of the Republic
- In office 2 July 1987 – 22 April 1992
- Constituency: Lombardia

Extraordinary commissioner of FIGC
- In office 16 May 2006 – 19 September 2006
- Preceded by: Franco Carraro (as president of FIGC)
- Succeeded by: Luca Pancalli

Personal details
- Born: 16 March 1931 Milan, Italy
- Died: 21 August 2017 (aged 86) Milan, Italy
- Party: Italian Communist Party
- Other party: Independent Left
- Spouse: Francesca
- Children: 3, including Sara and Livia
- Profession: Jurist, lawyer, politician

Guido Rossi (16 March 1931 – 21 August 2017) was an Italian jurist, lawyer, and politician.

== Biography ==
Rossi was born in Milan on 16 March 1931. He studied at the Ghislieri College from 1948 to 1953, and graduated in law from the University of Pavia. In 1954, he obtained a Master of Laws at Harvard University. As a former professor of commercial law, comparative private law, and philosophy of law in Trieste, Venice, Pavia, and Milan at the Statale, Bocconi, and Vita-Salute San Raffaele universities, he was appointed president of Consob, Italy's equivalent of the Securities and Exchange Commission, in 1981. A member of the Senate of the Republic for the Italian Communist Party and later the Independent Left in the Legislature X of Italy from 1987 to 1992, (Note: Rossi was elected as an independent politician within the Italian Communist Party's electoral list.) he was the promoter of antitrust legislation in Italy. He later led Ferruzzi-Montedison, and then Telecom Italia.

For a year in the 2000s, Rossi defended the Dutch bank Abn Amro. In 2003, he defended Cesare Geronzi, the president of Capitalia, who was involved in the Cirio and Parmalat scandals. In 2006, he was appointed extraordinary commissioner of the Italian Football Federation (FIGC) to manage the emergency situation created after the Calciopoli scandal. On 15 September 2006, following the resignation of Marco Tronchetti Provera, he was reappointed president of Telecom Italia, and told a parliamentary committee in Rome that the company would cut its debt to €38 billion by the end of the year from €41.3 billion in June. He held this position until 6 April 2007. In 2008, in an attempt to relaunch the company in crisis of sales, he became a consultant for Fiat.

Rossi was editor-in-chief of the magazines Rivista delle Società and Banca, Borsa e Titoli di Credito, as well as a columnist for il manifesto and Il Sole 24 Ore. On 4 May 2011, he was appointed ethical guarantor of Consob, a position from which he resigned on 26 October 2012. In 2013, he described Bitcoin as "a risky instrument", and compared it to derivatives, and said it "can overturn the rules of capitalism." Rossi died in Milan on 21 August 2017, aged 86. He is survived by his wife Francesca and their daughters Sara and Livia, as well as a daughter from his previous marriage, Alessandra. As an atheist and in line with his personal views, no funeral was held. In 2018, his name was inscribed in the Famedio inside the Monumental Cemetery of Milan.

== FIGC commissioner and Calciopoli ==
As the FIGC's extraordinary commissioner in the aftermath of the 2006 Calciopoli, amid calls to have Marcello Lippi, the then Italy national football team, replaced by the likes of Carlo Ancelotti, Claudio Gentile, and Dino Zoff, Rossi was given the final decision. From the beginning, he wanted to avoid any change, and he ultimately decided to keep Lippi; he said that he had full trust in Lippi. After Italy won the 2006 FIFA World Cup in July, and despite Rossi's attempts to convince him to stay, saying that "he should remain by popular acclamation because he is the right coach for this national team", Lippi decided to leave, citing insults to himself and his son. He resigned from FIGC on 19 September 2006, to become the president of Telecom Italia.

Rossi's stint as the FIGC's extraordinary commissioner during the Calciopoli scandal, as well as his role in the scandal's investigation, (Note: Rossi appointed Francesco Saverio Borrelli at the head of the investigation. Judge Corrado De Biase, 1980 Totonero chief investigator commented on the sentence of Borrelli, who spoke of a structured illicit, which was not part of the Code of Sports Justice, as a crime committed by Luciano Moggi and his associates. He said: "We're talking about a structured illicit. But what is it? It doesn't exist. They want to make it clear that there's something different, anomalous. But structured illicit, not at all. There's no sporting illicit. We can't talk about things that don't exist in the sports judicial system. I still haven't seen any proof of sporting illicit. Until now, what I see is the violation of Article 1 of the Sports Justice Code, which requires members to behave according to the principles of loyalty, correctness, and probity. But of what we have read to date, it doesn't prove to me that there was an attempt to alter a match." About Borrelli's role, journalist Giorgio Bocca stated: "The appointment of Borrelli to direct the investigation into the great football scandal is the litmus test, the chemical reagent, the proof of truth, the fall of lies, the naked king of the Berlusconi people who 'don't give up', who don't tolerate returns to justice, who conceive democracy only as an alliance of the strongest and richest clans.") and the 26 July 2006 decision to award third-placed Inter Milan the 2005–06 Serie A title after penalties for the other clubs, (Note: Several observers said that even though Rossi justified the decision due to UEFA needing which clubs would take part to its European competitions, UEFA only needed a final standing to known the seven clubs that would take part to its competitions, and there was no need to crown a champion. The decision itself was even more controversial because the 2005–06 title was assigned ad personam by Rossi, and not by the FIGC or Lega Calcio, on the basis of a joint decision of the Three Sages; one of them abstained and the other voted against the re-assignation to another team, while former UEFA general secretary Gerhard Aigner voted in favour. In 2010, Aigner said that Juventus and Milan were the main culprits, while referees and Inter Milan and the other clubs were the victims. Roberto Pardolesi, one of the three members of the commission chaired by Aigner, who with a legal opinion gave the green light to the reassignment of the 2006 title after the revocation from Juventus due to the Calciopoli events, stated: "If there are new elements, obviously the procedure would have to be re-instructed." The Calciopoli bis developments, as well as the Calciopoli trials in Naples, revealed the involvement of many other clubs and executives who were not punished in 2006. In 2011, the FIGC's public prosecutor Stefano Palazzi charged Inter Milan, Livorno, and Milan of direct Article 6 violations, the ones about sporting illicits; Juventus, which were acquitted by ordinary justice, were controversially relegated to Serie B, without a direct Article 6 violation, through a sum of Article 1 violations, because they were alleged to have exclusive relations with referee designators, a charge that was discredited when thousands of wiretaps not relied for the controversial 2006 sporting trial became public. As the statute of limitations time-barred Palazzi's charges, none of those clubs including Inter Milan were put on trial.) were controversial. (Note: In an interview to L'Unione Sarda regarding Rossi's decision, Carlo Porceddu, the FIGC's prosecutor from 1998 to 2001 and vice-president of the Federal Court of Appeal, stated: "Revoking the 2005/2006 scudetto from Juventus and assigning to Inter Milan was a serious mistake. The Calciopoli investigation should have been more thorough, so much so that we, as the Federal Court, had limited the penalty to Juventus not withdrawing the championship title due to insufficient evidence. In fact, that aspect had been neglected. Then, the special commissioner of the [Italian Football] Federation of that period had appointed a group of his friends, one of whom was also on the board of directors of Inter Milan, and that title was revoked from Juventus and given to Inter Milan. That was a grave error in my view." Purceddu also said how several aspects of the investigation needed to be clarified. In later years, Franco Carraro recalled how "a month later [after the decision] Rossi goes to be president of Telecom for the second time, whose largest shareholder is Marco Tronchetti Provera, vice-president of Inter Milan." Piero Sandulli, president of the FIGC's National Court of Appeal, was against giving the scudetto to Inter Milan, and stated to have been criticized at that time for it; in later years, Sandulli reiterated that the title should not have been assigned to Inter Milan. The decision was further condemned because of Inter Milan's involvement, among other clubs not originally implicated, which could not be put on trial due to the statute of limitations. This caused a dispute between the FIGC, Inter Milan, and Juventus.) Rossi was an avowed supporter of Inter Milan, an association football club of which he served as a member of the board of directors from 1995 to 1999. He was accused of partiality and conflict of interest, charges that Rossi denied. In an interview with the Corriere della Sera, former FIGC president Franco Carraro said that Rossi, with regard to the assignment of the title, had been badly advised by the experts, the Three Sages (Gerhard Aigner, Massimo Coccia, and Roberto Pardolesi), he appointed. Aigner denied this, saying that his task and that of the other two experts was to verify whether the statutes and regulations of UEFA, FIGC, and Lega Calcio allowed for the possibility of creating a different standings after the penalty of some clubs. According to Aigner, the rules granted this possibility and the task of experts was limited to confirming it to Rossi who, once he had acquired the legal opinion, autonomously decreed the assignment of the scudetto. (Note: Although it was deemed likely or certain that the FIGC would revoke Inter Milan's scudetto, and despite Juventus' appeals to have it revoked even without giving it back to Juventus, it did not happen; the FIGC's Federal Council voted to declare itself not competent.)

== Books ==
- Rossi, Guido (1956). Il fallimento nel diritto americano (in Italian). Padoa: CEDAM. ISBN 88-13-10663-7.
- Rossi, Guido (1957). Utili di bilancio, riserve e dividendo (in Italian). Milan: Giuffrè Editore.
- Rossi, Guido (1962). L'avallo come garanzia cambiaria tipica (in Italian). Milan: Giuffrè Editore.
- Rossi, Guido (1967). Persona giuridica, proprietà e rischio d'impresa (in Italian). Milan: Giuffrè Editore.
- Rossi, Guido (1982). Trasparenze e vergogna. Le società e la borsa (in Italian). Milan: Il Saggiatore.
- Rossi, Guido (1986). La scalata del mercato: la borsa e i valori mobiliari (in Italian). Bologna: Il Mulino. ISBN 88-15-01123-4.
- Rossi, Guido (2000). Il ratto del Sabine (in Italian). Milan: Adelphi Edizioni. ISBN 88-459-1559-X.
- Rossi, Guido (2003). Il conflitto epidemico (in Italian). Milan: Adelphi Edizioni. ISBN 88-459-1791-6.
- Rossi, Guido; Rampini, Federico (2005). Capitalismo opaco (in Italian). Bari: Editori Laterza. ISBN 88-420-7649-X.
- Rossi, Guido (2006). Il gioco delle regole (in Italian). Milan: Adelphi Edizioni. ISBN 88-459-2014-3.
- Rossi, Guido (2008). Il mercato d'azzardo (in Italian). Milan: Adelphi Edizioni. ISBN 88-459-2241-3.
- Rossi, Guido (2008). Perché filosofia (in Italian). Milan: Editrice San Raffaele. ISBN 88-86270-59-3.
- Rossi, Guido; Keynes, John Maynard (2009). Possibilità economiche per i nostri nipoti? (in Italian). Milan: Adelphi Edizioni. ISBN 978-8-8459-2374-6.
- Rossi, Guido; Prodi, Paolo (2010). Non rubare (in Italian). Bologna: Il Mulino. ISBN 978-8-8151-3778-4.
- Rossi, Guido (2010). Quei maniaci chiamati collezionisti (in Italian). Milan: Archinto Editrice. ISBN 978-8-877-68563-6.
