= Lars-Christer Olsson =

Swedish footballer

UEFA Chief Executive
- In office 7 November 2003 – 1 February 2007
- Preceded by: Gerhard Aigner
- Succeeded by: Gianni Infantino

Personal details
- Born: 6 February 1950 (age 76) Lövestad, Sweden

Lars-Christer Olsson (born 6 February 1950) is a Swedish sports official who served as UEFA chief executive from 7 November 2003 until he resigned on 1 February 2007.

== Career ==
Olsson served as chairman of the Swedish Professional Football Leagues from 2012 until his resignation at the organisation's Annual General Meeting in March 2021.

In March 2016, he was appointed chairman of the European Professional Football Leagues (EPFL), later renamed European Leagues. He stepped down as chairman of European Leagues in March 2021 due to retirement and was appointed the association's first Honorary President by acclamation.

Preceded by Gerhard Aigner	UEFA Chief Executive; 2003–2007	Succeeded by Gianni Infantino
