= UEFA European Championship =

Association football tournament

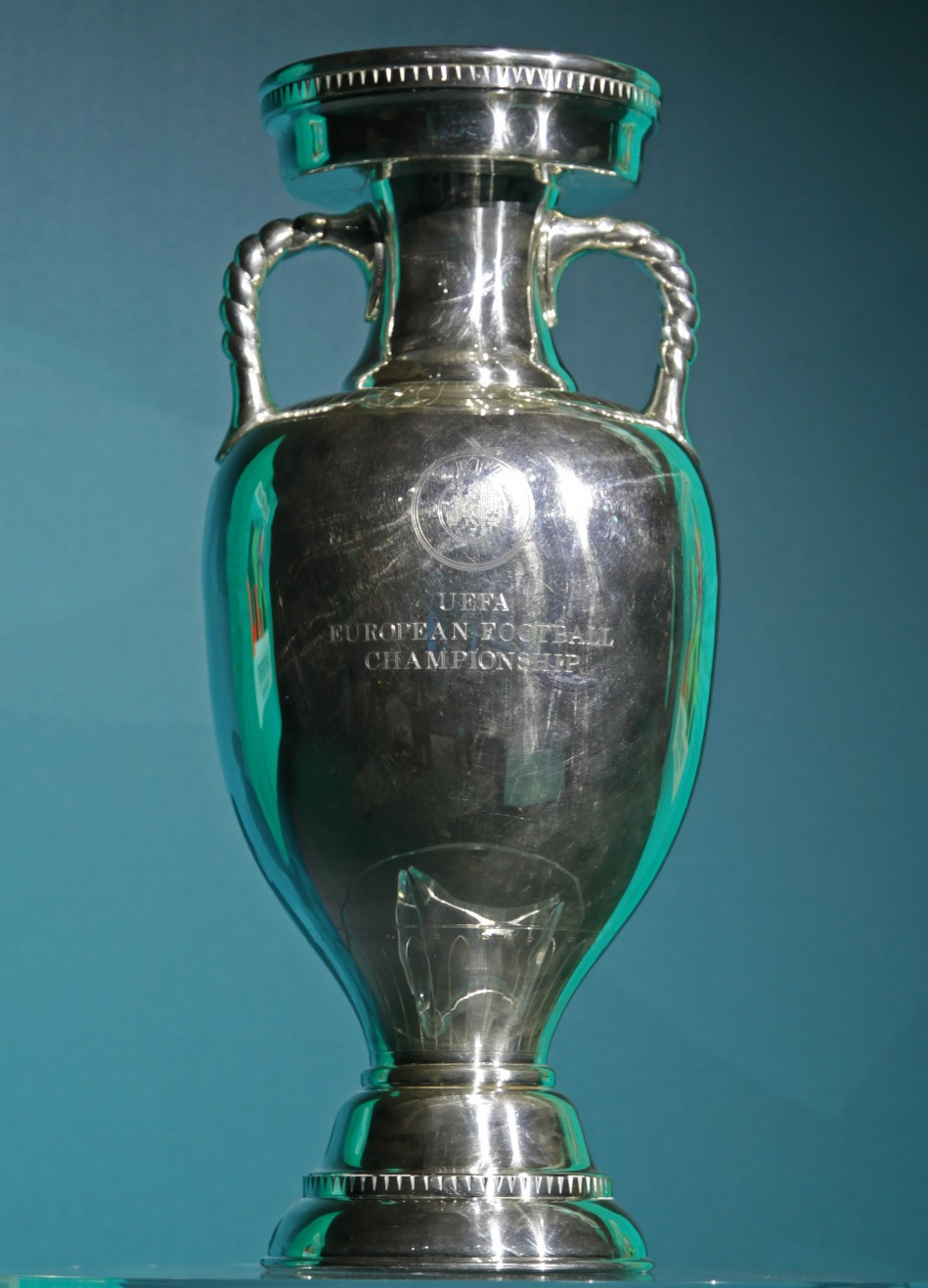
- The Henri Delaunay Trophy, awarded to the winner of the UEFA European Championship
- Organiser(s): UEFA
- Founded: 1958; 68 years ago
- Region: Europe
- Teams: 24
- Qualifier for: Finalissima
- Current champions: Spain (4th title)
- Most championships: Spain (4 titles)
- Website: uefa.com/uefaeuro

The UEFA European Football Championship, less formally the European Championship and informally the Euro or Euros, is the primary association football tournament organised by UEFA. The competition is contested by members' senior men's national teams, determining the continental champion of Europe. It is the second-most watched football tournament in the world after the FIFA World Cup. It was originally called the European Nations' Cup before changing to its current name in 1968.

The competition has generally been held every four years, scheduled to be in the even-numbered year between FIFA World Cup tournaments. It is staggered on an alternating two-year cycle with the UEFA Nations League. Before entering the tournament, all teams other than the host nations (which qualify automatically) compete in a qualifying process. From the 2020 edition onwards, the winner plays the Copa América champion in the Finalissima.

The seventeen European Championship tournaments have been won by ten national teams: Spain has won four titles; Germany has won three; Italy and France have won two titles; and the Soviet Union, Czechoslovakia, the Netherlands, Denmark, Greece, and Portugal have won one title each. To date, Spain is the only team to have won consecutive titles, doing so in 2008 and 2012.

== History ==
=== Beginnings (1960–1976) ===
Regional tournaments for national teams existed before the advent of an authentic pan-European competition. Starting in 1883, the British Home Championship was an annual competition contested between the United Kingdom's four national teams, England, Scotland, Wales, and Ireland. Until these national teams entered the FIFA World Cup in 1950, it was the most important international tournament these nations competed in. Similarly, from 1927 until 1960, the Central European International Cup was held six times. It brought together the national teams of Austria, Hungary, Italy, Czechoslovakia, Switzerland, and Yugoslavia. The idea for a pan-European football tournament was first proposed by the French Football Federation's secretary-general Henri Delaunay in 1927, but it was not until 1958 that the tournament was started, three years after Delaunay's death. In honour of Delaunay, the trophy awarded to the champions is named after him. The 1960 tournament, held in France, had four teams competing in the finals out of 17 that entered the competition. It was won by the Soviet Union, beating Yugoslavia 2–1 in a tense final in Paris. Spain withdrew from its quarter-final match against the Soviet Union because of two political protests. Of the 17 teams that entered the qualifying tournament, notable absentees were England, the Netherlands, West Germany and Italy.

Spain held the next tournament in 1964, which saw an increase in entries to the qualification tournament, with 29 entering; West Germany was a notable absentee once again and Greece withdrew after being drawn against Albania, with whom they were still at war. The hosts beat the title holders, the Soviet Union, 2–1 at the Santiago Bernabéu Stadium in Madrid.

The tournament format stayed the same for the 1968 tournament, hosted and won by Italy. For the first and only time, a match was decided on a coin toss (the semi-final between Italy and the Soviet Union) and the final went to be replayed, after the match against Yugoslavia finished 1–1. Italy won the replay 2–0. More teams entered this tournament (31), a testament to its burgeoning popularity.

Belgium hosted the 1972 tournament, which West Germany won, beating the Soviet Union 3–0 in the final, with goals coming from Gerd Müller (twice) and Herbert Wimmer at the Heysel Stadium in Brussels. This tournament would provide a taste of things to come, as the German senior team contained many of the key members of the 1974 FIFA World Cup-winning team.

The 1976 tournament in Yugoslavia was the last in which only four teams took part in the final tournament, and the last in which the hosts were chosen from the four qualified teams. Czechoslovakia beat West Germany in the newly introduced penalty shootout. After seven successful conversions, Uli Hoeneß missed, leaving Czechoslovak Antonín Panenka with the opportunity to score and win the tournament. An "audacious" chipped shot, described by UEFA as "perhaps the most famous spot kick of all time" secured the victory as Czechoslovakia won 5–3 on penalties.

=== Expansion to 8 teams (1980–1992) ===
The competition was expanded to eight teams in the 1980 tournament, again hosted by Italy. It involved a group stage, with the winners of the groups going on to contest the final, and the runners-up playing in the third place play-off. West Germany won their second European title by beating Belgium 2–1, with two goals scored by Horst Hrubesch at the Stadio Olimpico in Rome. Horst Hrubesch scored early in the first half before René Vandereycken equalised for Belgium with a penalty in the second half. With two minutes remaining, Hrubesch headed the winner for West Germany from a Karl-Heinz Rummenigge corner.

France won their first major title at home in the 1984 tournament, with their captain Michel Platini scoring nine goals in just five games, including the opening goal in the final, in which they beat Spain 2–0. The format also changed, with the top two teams in each group going through to a semi-final stage, instead of the winners of each group going straight into the final. The third place play-off was also abolished. The losing teams from the semi-finals win the bronze medal.

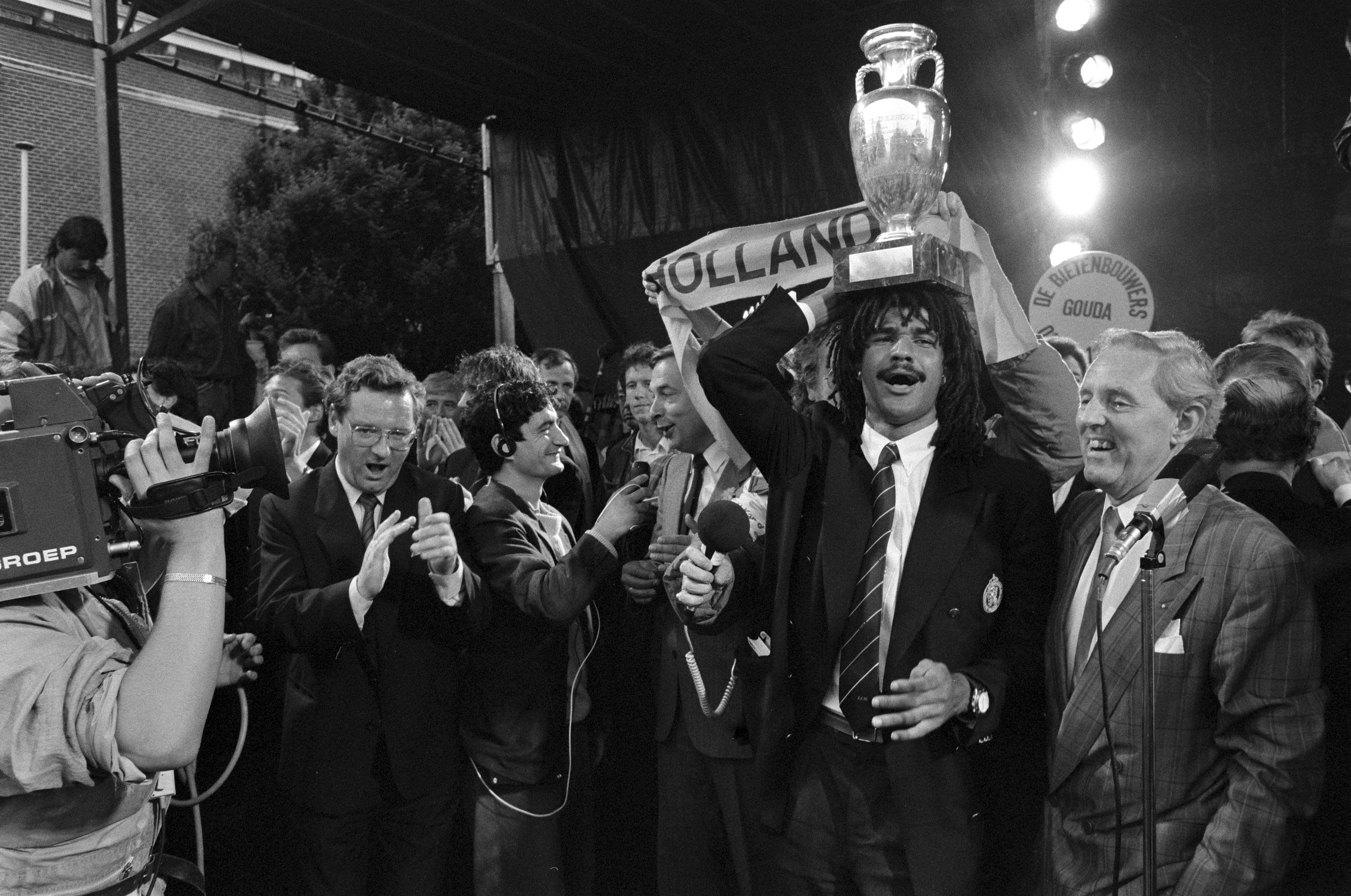
Ruud Gullit and the Netherlands team celebrating their victory in 1988

West Germany hosted UEFA Euro 1988, but lost 2–1 against the Netherlands, their traditional rivals, in the semi-finals, which sparked vigorous celebrations in the Netherlands. The Netherlands went on to win the tournament in a rematch of their first game of the group stage, beating the Soviet Union 2–0 at the Olympiastadion in Munich. Marco van Basten scored the second goal, a volley over the keeper from the right wing which is often considered one of the best goals ever scored.

UEFA Euro 1992 was held in Sweden and won by Denmark, which had been invited to the finals after UN sanctions prevented Yugoslavia's participation as some of the states constituting the Socialist Federal Republic of Yugoslavia were at war with each other. The Danes beat holders the Netherlands on penalties in the semi-finals, then defeated world champions Germany 2–0. This was the first tournament in which a unified Germany took part and also the first major tournament to have the players' names printed on their backs.

=== Expansion to 16 teams (1996–2012) ===
England hosted UEFA Euro 1996, the first tournament to use the nomenclature "Euro [year]" and would see the number of teams taking part double to 16. The hosts, in a replay of the 1990 FIFA World Cup semi-final, were knocked out on penalties by Germany. The surprise team of the tournament was the newly-formed Czech Republic, participating on its first international competition following the dissolution of Czechoslovakia, which reached the final after beating Portugal and France in the knockout stage. Germany won the final 2–1 due to the first golden goal ever in a major tournament, scored by Oliver Bierhoff five minutes into extra time. This was Germany's first title as a unified nation.

UEFA Euro 2000 was the first tournament to be held by two countries, in the Netherlands and Belgium. France, the reigning World Cup champions, were favoured to win, and they lived up to expectations when they beat Italy 2–1 after extra time, having come from being 1–0 down: Sylvain Wiltord equalised in the last minute of regular time and David Trezeguet scored the winning golden goal in extra time.

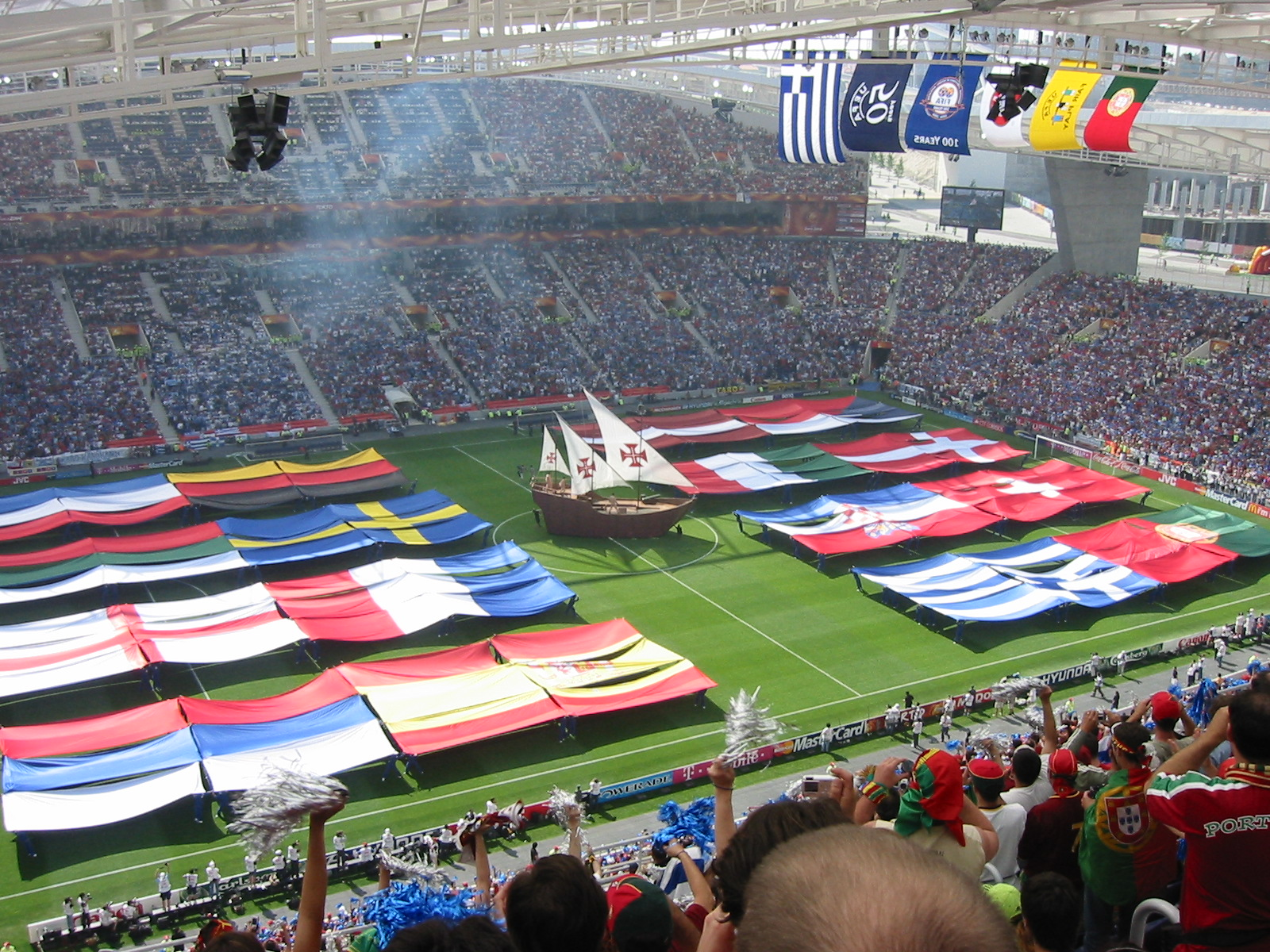
The UEFA Euro 2004 opening ceremony in Portugal.

Like the 1992 edition, UEFA Euro 2004 produced an upset: Greece, who had only qualified for one World Cup (1994) and one European Championship (1980) before, beat hosts Portugal 1–0 in the final (after having also beaten them in the opening game) with a goal scored by Angelos Charisteas in the 57th minute to win a tournament for which they were considered among the biggest underdogs. On their way to the final, they also beat holders France as well as the Czech Republic with a silver goal, a rule which replaced the previous golden goal in 2003, before being abolished itself shortly after this tournament.

The 2008 tournament, hosted by Austria and Switzerland, marked the second time that two nations co-hosted and the first edition where the new trophy was awarded. It began on 7 June and ended on 29 June. The final between Germany and Spain was held at the Ernst Happel Stadion in Vienna. Spain defeated Germany 1–0, with a goal scored by Fernando Torres in the 33rd minute, sparking much celebration across the country. This was their first title since the 1964 tournament. Spain were the highest scoring team with 12 goals scored and David Villa finished as the top scorer with four goals. Xavi was awarded the player of the tournament, and nine Spanish players were picked for the team of the tournament.

The UEFA Euro 2012 tournament was co-hosted by Poland and Ukraine. Spain defeated Italy 4–0 in the final, thus becoming the first nation to defend a European Championship title, as well as the first European team to win three consecutive major tournaments. In scoring the third goal of the final, Torres became the first player to score in two European Championship finals. He was equal top scorer for the tournament with three goals in total, along with Mario Balotelli, Alan Dzagoev, Mario Gómez, Mario Mandžukić, and Cristiano Ronaldo, despite only being used as a substitute player. The tournament was otherwise notable for having the most headed goals in a Euro tournament (26 out of 76 goals in total); a disallowed goal in the England versus Ukraine group game which replays showed had crossed the goal line, and which prompted President of FIFA Sepp Blatter to tweet, "GLT (Goal-line technology) is no longer an alternative but a necessity", thus reversing his long-held reluctance to embrace such technology; and some crowd violence in group games.

=== Expansion to 24 teams (2016–present) ===
In 2007, the Football Association of Ireland and Scottish Football Association proposed the expansion of the tournament, which was later confirmed by the UEFA Executive Committee in September 2008. Out of the 54 member associations of UEFA, only three, including England and Germany, opposed the expansion. On 28 May 2010, UEFA announced that UEFA Euro 2016 would be hosted by France. France beat bids of Turkey (7–6 in voting in the second voting round) and Italy, which had the fewest votes in the first voting round. Euro 2016 was the first to have 24 teams in the finals. This was the third time France have hosted the competition. Portugal, which qualified for the knockout phase despite finishing third in its group, went on to win the championship by defeating heavily favoured host team France 1–0 in the final, thanks to a goal from Eder in the 109th minute. Cristiano Ronaldo, Portugal's world-renowned striker, came out of the game due to injury in the 25th minute. This was the first time Portugal won a major tournament.

For the 2020 tournament, three bids were proposed, including a bid from Turkey, a joint bid from the Republic of Ireland, Scotland and Wales, and a joint bid from Georgia and Azerbaijan. However, in December 2012, UEFA announced that the 2020 tournament would be hosted in several cities in various countries across Europe, with the semi-finals and final being played in London. The venues were selected and announced by UEFA on 19 September 2014. However, Brussels was removed as a host city on 7 December 2017 due to delays with the building of the Eurostadium. On 17 March 2020, UEFA announced that Euro 2020 would be delayed by a year due to the COVID-19 pandemic in Europe, and proposed it take place from 11 June to 11 July 2021. The competition was postponed in order to reduce pressure on the public services in affected countries and to provide space in the calendar for the completion of domestic leagues that had been suspended. Before the Euro 2020, Dublin was also removed as one of the host cities due to its inability to guarantee spectators to the stadium, while Bilbao was replaced by Seville for the same reason. In the final, Italy defeated first time finalists England 3–2 on penalties, after the game was tied 1–1 after extra time, to win their second European Championship.

The 2024 tournament returned to its usual four-year cycle after the 2020 edition was postponed to 2021 due to the pandemic. Germany would beat Turkey for tournament hosting rights, marking the third time it would take place on German territory. Spain went on to win the tournament for a record fourth time after defeating England 2–1 in the final.

== Trophy ==
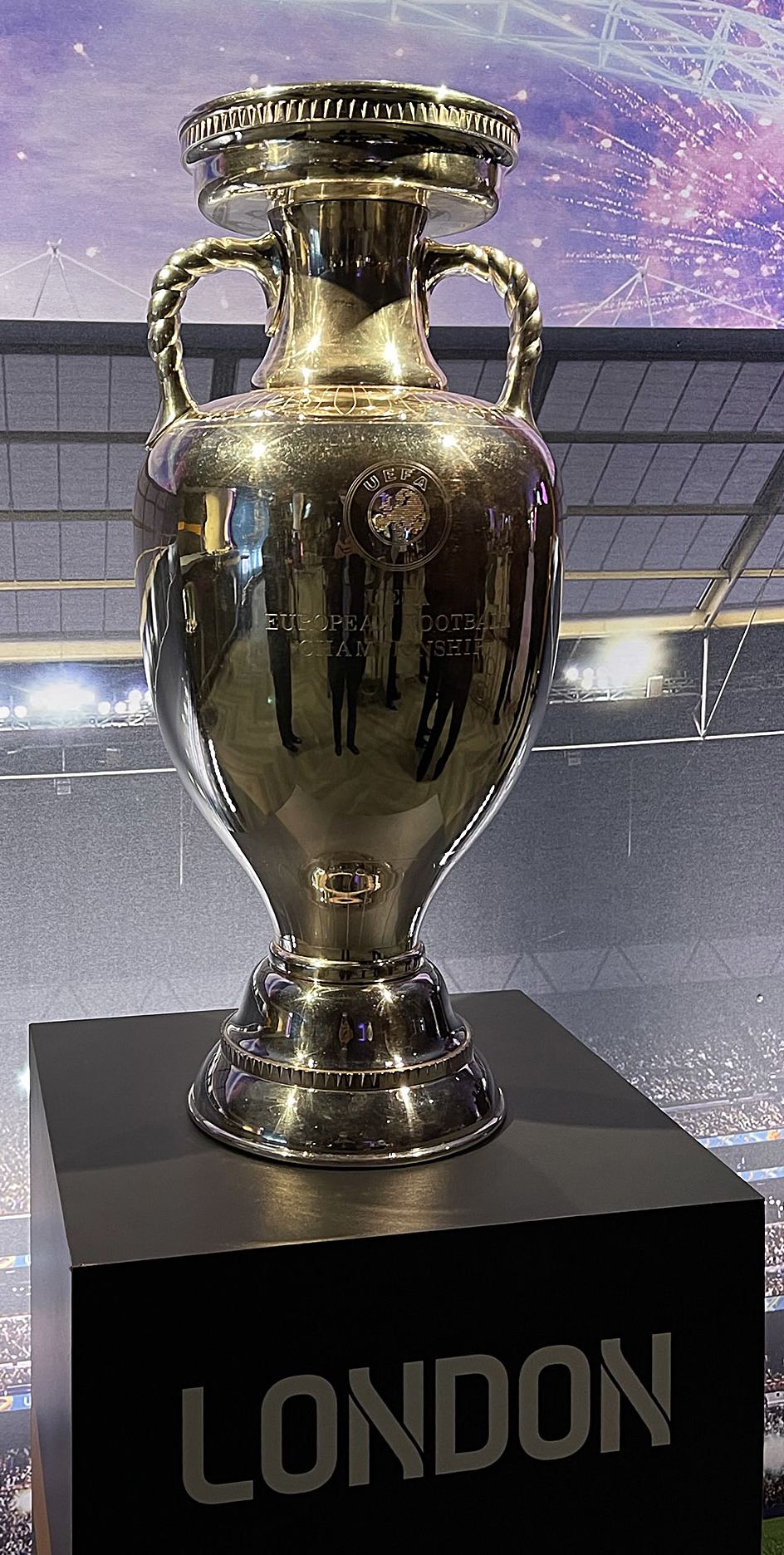
The trophy on display in 2021

The Henri Delaunay Trophy, which is awarded to the winner of the European Championship, is named in honour of Henri Delaunay, the first General Secretary of UEFA, who came up with the idea of a European championship but died five years before the first tournament in 1960. His son Pierre was in charge of creating the trophy. Since the first tournament it has been awarded to the winning team for them to keep for four years, until the next tournament. This trophy bore the words Coupe d'Europe (lit. 'European Cup'), Coupe Henri Delaunay (lit. 'Henri Delaunay Cup'), and Championnat d'Europe (lit. 'European Championship') on the front and a juggling boy on the back.

For the 2008 tournament, the Henri Delaunay Trophy was remodelled to make it larger, as the old trophy was overshadowed by UEFA's other trophies such as the new European Champion Clubs' Cup. The new trophy, which is made of sterling silver, now weighs 8 kilograms (18 lb) and is 60 centimetres (24 in) tall, being 2 kilograms (4.4 lb) heavier and 18 centimetres (7.1 in) longer than the old one. The marble plinth that was serving as base was removed. The new silver base of the trophy had to be enlarged to make it stable. The names of the winning countries that had appeared on the plaques glued to the plinth are now engraved on the back of the trophy, under the word Coupe Henri Delaunay and are written in English rather than French its predecessor had. Since 2016, the juggling boy was returned on the trophy's back.

The players and coaches of the winning team and the runner-up team are awarded gold and silver medals, respectively. Each association that competes in the final tournament receives a commemorative plaque. Each time the team losing semi-finalist, as well as each finalist, receive a dedicated plaque. Although there is no longer a third place play-off, UEFA decided in the 2008 edition to award the semi-final losers (Turkey and Russia) bronze medals for the first time, and did the same in the 2012 edition when Germany and Portugal received bronze medals. However, UEFA decided that losing semi-finalists would no longer receive medals from the 2016 edition onwards. Bronze medals were previously awarded for winners of the third place play-off, the last of which was held in 1980.

== Format ==
=== The competition ===
Before 1980, only four teams qualified for the final tournament. From 1980, eight teams competed. In 1996 the tournament expanded to 16 teams, since it was easier for European nations to qualify for the World Cup than their own continental championship; 14 of the 24 teams at the 1982, 1986 and 1990 World Cups had been European, whereas the European Championship finals still involved only eight teams.

In 2007, there was much discussion about an expansion of the tournament to 24 teams, started by Scotland and the Republic of Ireland, due to the increased number of football associations in Europe after the break-ups of Czechoslovakia, Yugoslavia and the Soviet Union, and the inclusion of Israel and Kazakhstan. The new president of UEFA, Michel Platini, was reported to be in favour of expansion which proved an accurate assumption. On 17 April 2007, although UEFA's executive committee formally decided against expansion in 2012, Platini indicated in June 2008 that UEFA would increase participation from 16 to 24 teams in future tournaments, starting from 2016. On 25 September, it was announced by Franz Beckenbauer that an agreement had been reached, and the expansion to 24 teams would be officially announced the next day.

The competing teams are chosen by a series of qualifying games: in 1960 and 1964 through home and away play-offs; from 1968 through a combination of both qualifying groups and play-off games. The host country was selected from the four finalists after they were determined through qualifying.

Since the expansion of the final tournament starting from 1980, the host country, or countries, have been chosen beforehand and qualify automatically.

In most tournaments, the tournament consists of a round-robin group stage followed by a single-elimination knockout stage.

Year	Teams	Matches		Format
Year	Teams	Min.	Act.	Format
1960	4	4		semi-finals, 3rd-place match, final
1964	4	4		semi-finals, 3rd-place match, final
1968	4	4	5	semi-finals, 3rd-place match, final
1972	4	4		semi-finals, 3rd-place match, final
1976	4	4		semi-finals, 3rd-place match, final
1980	8	14		2 groups of 4, 3rd-place match, final
1984	8	15		2 groups of 4, semi-finals, final
1988	8	15		2 groups of 4, semi-finals, final
1992	8	15		2 groups of 4, semi-finals, final
1996	16	31		4 groups of 4, quarter-finals, semi-finals, final
2000	16	31		4 groups of 4, quarter-finals, semi-finals, final
2004	16	31		4 groups of 4, quarter-finals, semi-finals, final
2008	16	31		4 groups of 4, quarter-finals, semi-finals, final
2012	16	31		4 groups of 4, quarter-finals, semi-finals, final
2016	24	51		6 groups of 4, round of 16, quarter-finals, semi-finals, final
2020	24	51		6 groups of 4, round of 16, quarter-finals, semi-finals, final
2024	24	51		6 groups of 4, round of 16, quarter-finals, semi-finals, final
2028	24	51		6 groups of 4, round of 16, quarter-finals, semi-finals, final
2032	24	51		6 groups of 4, round of 16, quarter-finals, semi-finals, final

Up to 1968 draws were to be broken via a coin toss in all matches but the final, draw in final match was resolved via a replay.

No third place play-off has been played since 1980.

=== Qualifying ===
A team must finish in one of the direct qualifying spots or win a play-off to qualify. Afterwards, it proceeds to the finals round in the host country, although hosts qualify for the tournament automatically.

The groups for qualification are drawn by a UEFA committee using seeding. Seeded teams include reigning champions and other teams based on their performance in the preceding FIFA World Cup qualifying and the last European Championship qualifying. To obtain an accurate view of the teams' abilities, a ranking is produced. This is calculated by taking the total number of points won by a particular team and dividing it by the number of games played, i.e. points per game. In the case of a team having hosted one of the two previous competitions and therefore having qualified automatically, only the results from the single most recent qualifying competition are used. If two teams have equal points per game, the committee then bases their positions in the rankings on:

1. Coefficient from the matches played in its most recent qualifying competition,
2. Average goal difference,
3. Average number of goals scored,
4. Average number of away goals scored, and
5. Drawing of lots.

The qualifying phase is played in a group format. The composition of the groups is determined through means of a draw of teams from pre-defined seeded bowls. The draw takes place after the preceding World Cup's qualifying competition. For UEFA Euro 2020, the group qualifying phase consisted of ten groups; five of six teams and the remainder of five teams each.

Each group is played in a league format with teams playing each other home and away. The top two teams then qualified for the final tournament, with remaining places decided by playoffs depending on their ranking in the UEFA Nations League. As with most leagues, the points are awarded as three for a win, one for a draw, and none for a loss. In the eventuality of one or more teams having equal points after all matches have been played, the following criteria are used to distinguish the sides:

1. Higher number of points obtained in the group matches played among the teams in question.
2. Superior goal difference from the group matches played among the teams in question.
3. Higher number of goals scored in the group matches played among the teams in question.
4. Higher number of goals scored away from home in the group matches played among the teams in question.
5. Results of all group matches:
  1. Superior goal difference
  2. Higher number of goals scored
  3. Higher number of goals scored away from home
  4. Fair play conduct.
6. Drawing of lots.

=== Final tournament ===
Map of countries' best results

Sixteen teams progressed to the final tournament for the 2012 tournament. They were joint hosts Poland and Ukraine, the winners and the highest ranked second-placed team from the nine qualifying groups as well as the winners of four play-off matches between the runners-up of the other groups. These sixteen teams were divided equally into four groups, A, B, C and D, each consisting of four teams. The groups were drawn up by the UEFA administration, again using seeding. The seeded teams being the host nations, the reigning champions, should they qualify, and those with the best points per game coefficients over the qualifying phase of the tournament and the previous World Cup qualifying. Other finalists were assigned to by means of a draw, using coefficients as a basis.

For the 2016 tournament, the expansion to 24 teams means that the teams will be drawn into six groups of four, with the six group winners, six group runners-up and the four best third-placed teams advancing to the round of 16 when it becomes a knockout competition.

The groups are again played in a league format, where a team plays its opponents once each. The same points system is used (three points for a win, one point for a draw, no points for a defeat). A schedule for the group matches will be drawn up, but the last two matches in a group must kick off simultaneously. The winner and runner-up of each group progress to the next round, where a knockout system is used (the two teams play each other once, the winner progresses), this is used in all subsequent rounds as well. The winners of the quarter-finals matches progress to the semi-finals, where the winners play in the final. If in any of the knockout rounds, the scores are still equal after normal playing time, extra time and penalties are employed to separate the two teams. Unlike the FIFA World Cup, this tournament no longer has a third place playoff.

== Results ==
Ed.	Year	Hosts	Final			Third place playoff / losing semi-finalists (Note: No third place play-off has been played since 1980; losing semi-finalists are listed in alphabetical order.) (Note: At the Euro 2008, UEFA awarded bronze medals to the losing semi-finalists, Russia and Turkey, for the first time. Four years later, at Euro 2012, Germany and Portugal also received this recognition after their semi-final exits. Since 2016, UEFA no longer awards bronze medals to the losing semi-finalists.)			Teams
Ed.	Year	Hosts	Winners	Score	Runners-up	Third place	Score	Fourth place	Teams
1	1960	France	Soviet Union	2–1 (a.e.t.)	Yugoslavia	Czechoslovakia	2–0	France	4
2	1964	Spain	Spain	2–1	Soviet Union	Hungary	3–1 (a.e.t.)	Denmark	4
3	1968	Italy	Italy	1–1 (a.e.t.); 2–0 (replay)	Yugoslavia	England	2–0	Soviet Union	4
4	1972	Belgium	West Germany	3–0	Soviet Union	Belgium	2–1	Hungary	4
5	1976	Yugoslavia	Czechoslovakia	2–2 (a.e.t.) (5–3 p)	West Germany	Netherlands	3–2 (a.e.t.)	Yugoslavia	4
6	1980	Italy	West Germany	2–1	Belgium	Czechoslovakia	1–1 (Note: No extra time was played.) (9–8 p)	Italy	8
7	1984	France	France	2–0	Spain	Denmark and Portugal			8
8	1988	West Germany	Netherlands	2–0	Soviet Union	Italy and West Germany			8
9	1992	Sweden	Denmark	2–0	Germany	Netherlands and Sweden			8
10	1996	England	Germany	2–1 (g.g.)	Czech Republic	England and France			16
11	2000	Belgium; Netherlands	France	2–1 (g.g.)	Italy	Netherlands and Portugal			16
12	2004	Portugal	Greece	1–0	Portugal	Czech Republic and Netherlands			16
13	2008	Austria; Switzerland	Spain	1–0	Germany	Russia and Turkey			16
14	2012	Poland; Ukraine	Spain	4–0	Italy	Germany and Portugal			16
15	2016	France	Portugal	1–0 (a.e.t.)	France	Germany and Wales			24
16	2020 (Note: Postponed to 2021 due to the COVID-19 pandemic in Europe.)	Pan-Europe (Note: Pan–European edition hosted by eleven countries: Azerbaijan, Denmark, England, Germany, Hungary, Italy, the Netherlands, Romania, Russia, Scotland and Spain.)	Italy	1–1 (a.e.t.) (3–2 p)	England	Denmark and Spain			24
17	2024	Germany	Spain	2–1	England	France and Netherlands			24
18	2028	England; Ireland; Scotland; Wales							24
19	2032	Italy; Turkey							24

== Summary ==
Map of winners

Performances in the UEFA European Championship by team
Team	Title(s)	Runners-up	Years won	Years runner-up
Spain	4	1	1964, 2008, 2012, 2024	1984
Germany (Note: Including West Germany)	3	3	1972, 1980, 1996	1976, 1992, 2008
Italy	2	2	1968, 2020	2000, 2012
France	2	1	1984, 2000	2016
Soviet Union	1	3	1960	1964, 1972, 1988
Portugal	1	1	2016	2004
Czechoslovakia	1	—	1976	—
Netherlands	1	—	1988	—
Denmark	1	—	1992	—
Greece	1	—	2004	—
Yugoslavia	—	2	—	1960, 1968
England	—	2	—	2020, 2024
Belgium	—	1	—	1980
Czech Republic	—	1	—	1996

== Records and statistics ==
=== Top goalscorers ===
Table key
Player	Denotes player still active at international level
‡	Denotes national top scorer (or joint top scorer) at the Euro
[ ]	Denotes tournaments where the player was part of the squad, but did not play in a match
( )	Denotes tournaments where the player played in a match, but did not score a goal
Year	Denotes tournaments where the player's team won the title
T	Denotes tournaments where the player was top scorer
	Denotes the overall tournament record

Top goalscorers at UEFA Euro tournaments
Rank	Player	Team	Goals scored	Matches played	Ratio	Tournaments	Notes
1	Cristiano Ronaldo^{‡}	Portugal	14	30	0.47	2004, 2008, 2012^{T}, 2016, 2020^{T}, (2024)	list
2	Michel Platini^{‡}	France	9	5	1.80	1984^{T}	list
3	Alan Shearer^{‡}	England	7	9	0.78	(1992), 1996^{T}, 2000	list
3	Antoine Griezmann	France	7	17	0.41	2016^{T}, 2020, (2024)	list
3	Álvaro Morata^{‡}	Spain	7	17	0.41	2016, 2020, 2024	list
3	Harry Kane^{‡}	England	7	18	0.39	(2016), 2020, 2024^{T}	list
7	Patrik Schick^{‡}	Czech Republic	6	7	0.86	2020^{T}, 2024	list
7	Ruud van Nistelrooy^{‡}	Netherlands	6	8	0.75	2004, 2008	list
7	Patrick Kluivert^{‡}	Netherlands	6	9	0.67	1996, 2000^{T}, [2004]	list
7	Wayne Rooney	England	6	10	0.60	2004, 2012, 2016	list
7	Thierry Henry	France	6	11	0.55	2000, 2004, 2008	list
7	Zlatan Ibrahimović^{‡}	Sweden	6	13	0.46	2004, 2008, 2012, (2016)	list
7	Robert Lewandowski^{‡}	Poland	6	13	0.46	2012, 2016, 2020, 2024	list
7	Nuno Gomes	Portugal	6	14	0.43	2000, 2004, 2008	list
7	Romelu Lukaku^{‡}	Belgium	6	14	0.43	2016, 2020, (2024)	list

== Awards ==
There are currently five post-tournament awards, and one given during the tournament:

- Player of the Tournament award for the best player, first awarded in 1996.
- Top Scorer award (currently named Alipay Top Scorer award for sponsorship reasons) for the most prolific goal scorer.
- Young Player of the Tournament (currently named SOCAR Young Player of the Tournament for sponsorship reasons) for the best player under the age of 21, first awarded in 2016.
- Man of the Match award for outstanding performance during each game of the tournament, first awarded in 1996.
- Team of the Tournament award for the best combined team of players in the tournament.

== See also ==
- UEFA Nations League
- British Home Championship
- Central European International Cup
- UEFA European Championship mascot
- UEFA European Championship Teams of the Tournament
- UEFA European Under-17 Championship
- UEFA European Under-19 Championship
- UEFA European Under-21 Championship
- UEFA Women's Championship
