= Erich Gehbauer =

German footballer and coach

Personal information
- Date of birth: 15 October 1926
- Date of death: 2014 (aged 87–88)
- Position: Midfielder

Senior career*
Years	Team	Apps	(Gls)
- Wormatia Worms; SV Darmstadt 98; Rot-Weiss Frankfurt; SV Wixhausen; Germania Oberroden
- * Club domestic league appearances and goals

Erich Gehbauer (15 October 1926 - 2014) was a former German footballer and coach. In the 1971/72 season, he won the German amateur championship with the FSV Frankfurt.

== Career ==
Erich Gehbauer began his football career as a midfielder in the youth team of the FV Hofheim. After the end of the Second World War he played in Wormatia Worms. After a total of 18 assignments with eight goals, he went to the amateur camp, where he played for SV Darmstadt 98, Rot-Weiss Frankfurt, SV Wixhausen and Germania Oberroden until 1964.

== See also ==
- Gerhard Aigner
