= Hans Bangerter =

Swiss administrator (1924–2022)

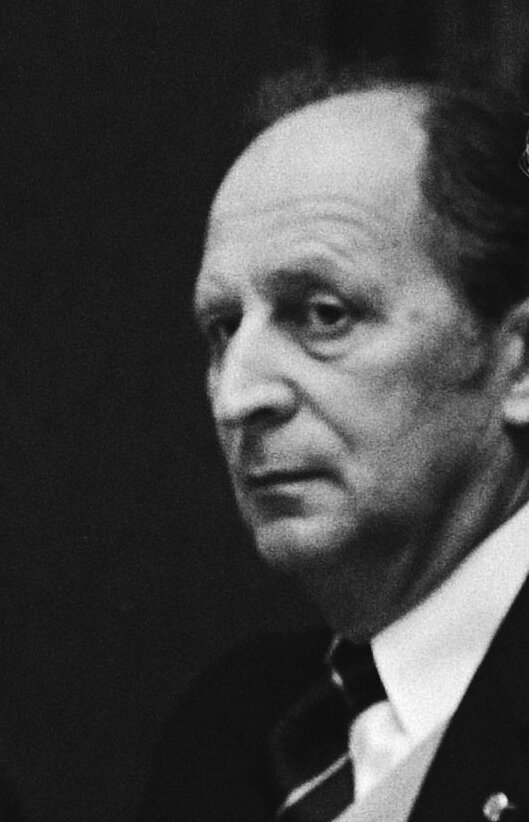
- Bangerter in 1979

UEFA General Secretary
- In office 1960–1989
- Preceded by: Pierre Delaunay
- Succeeded by: Gerhard Aigner

Personal details
- Born: 10 June 1924 Studen, Switzerland
- Died: 29 July 2022 (aged 98)

Hans Bangerter (10 June 1924 – 29 July 2022) was a Swiss football administrator who was the General Secretary of the UEFA from 1960 to 1989. Starting in 1989 he served as chairman of the board of the Euro-Sportring Foundation. As of June 2019, Bangerter was still attending the UEFA Congress and major UEFA competition finals. He died on 29 July 2022, aged 98.

Preceded by Pierre Delaunay	UEFA General Secretary; 1960–1989	Succeeded by Gerhard Aigner
