= Euro-Sportring =

International Sport Organization

Euro-Sportring is a foundation that organises international sports tournaments, particularly for youth teams. The objective of the foundation is to promote international contacts between sports clubs and similar organisations through the medium of sport, in order to make a contribution to a better understanding between sportsmen of different nationalities and thereby to a united Europe.

== Tournaments ==
The programme comprises football and handball tournaments in 12 European countries. The tournaments are organised by local partners, mostly sports clubs that are supported by their municipality and the local sports association.

Annually approximately 8,000 teams from over 30 countries take part in the tournaments. Registration for the tournaments is open to teams of amateur clubs and comparable organisations affiliated to an official governing sports body.

== Organisation ==
The head office is located in Baarn, Netherlands. The daily management operates under the supervision of the foundation's board.

Current board
Name	Since	Function	Domicile
Alfred Ludwig	2016	Chairman	Austria
Jim Stjerne Hansen	2014	Treasurer	Denmark
Priscilla Janssens	2020	Member	Netherlands
Willi Hink	2022	Member	Germany
Petr Fousek	2022	Member	Czech Republic

== History ==
The history of Euro-Sportring goes back to 1951, when the first sports exchange between Haarlem, Netherlands and Saarbrücken, Germany took place. In 1960, Euro-Sportring was registered in Amsterdam as a non-profit foundation. Originally, the sports programmes were held in Germany, the Netherlands, Denmark and Austria. Over the years, other European countries were gradually incorporated to the programme.

Development tournament programme:

- 1960s → Austria Denmark Germany Netherlands
- 1970s → England France Spain
- 1980s → Belgium Italy
- 1990s → Czech Republic Croatia
- 2000s → Poland

Former Chairman
Name	Domicile	Term
Gerhard Aigner	Switzerland	2010-2023
Hans Bangerter	Switzerland	1995-2010
Jo van Marle	Netherlands	1985-1995
Emannuel Rose	Denmark	1971-1985
Hugo Barber	Austria	1960-1971
