= Henri Delaunay =

French football administrator (1883–1955)

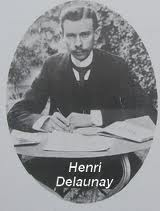

UEFA General Secretary
- In office 15 June 1954 – 9 November 1955
- Succeeded by: Pierre Delaunay

Personal details
- Born: 15 June 1883 Paris, France
- Died: 9 November 1955 (aged 72) Paris, France

Henri Delaunay (15 June 1883 – 9 November 1955) was a French football administrator.

== Biography ==
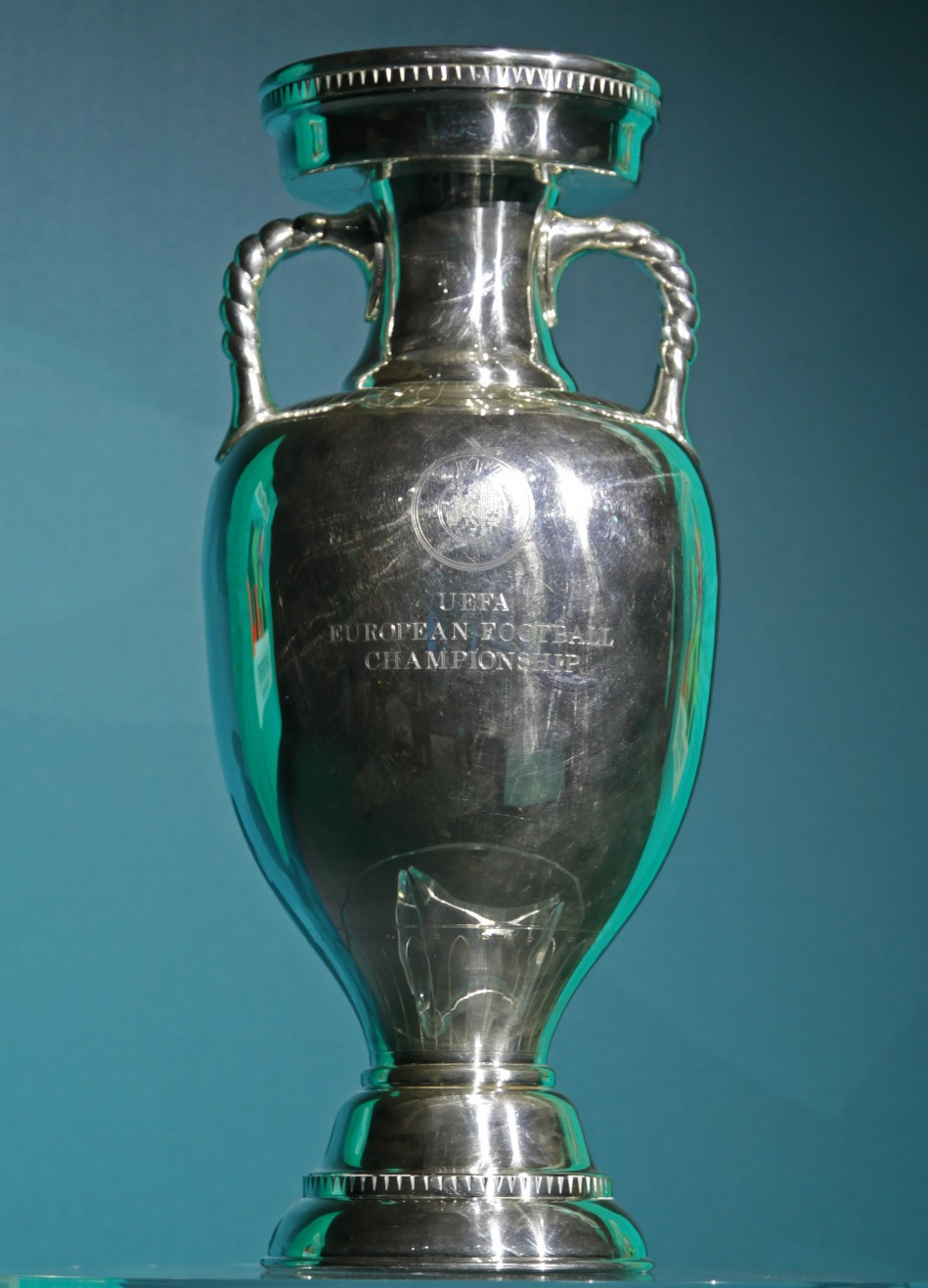
UEFA European Championship Trophy is named after him.

After playing for the Paris team Étoile des Deux Lacs, Delaunay became a referee. He retired following an incident during a match between AF Garenne-Doves and ES Benevolence, when he swallowed his whistle and broke two teeth on being struck full in the face by the ball.

He started his career as an administrator in 1905 when he became president of Étoile des Deux Lacs, then secretary-general of the Comité français interfédéral (CFI), the ancestor of the French Football Federation. When the CFI became the French Football Federation in 1919, he remained as secretary-general.

As a member of FIFA, he sat on its board as deputy from 1924 until 1928. Along with Jules Rimet, he was an early architect of the FIFA World Cup. He was also a very early proponent of the European Champions Cup, as early as the 1920s.

Together with Jules Rimet, he was largely responsible for the creation of the European Football Championship, the trophy of which is named after him, having first proposed it in 1927. The first tournament took place in 1960.

He was General Secretary of UEFA from its foundation on 15 June 1954 until his death. When he died in 1955, he was succeeded as head of UEFA by his son Pierre Delaunay.

== Awards ==
- Knight of the Legion of Honour (1927)

| Preceded by (none) | UEFA General Secretary; 1954–1955 | Succeeded by Pierre Delaunay |
