= Sandro Mencucci =

Italian businessman (born 1961)

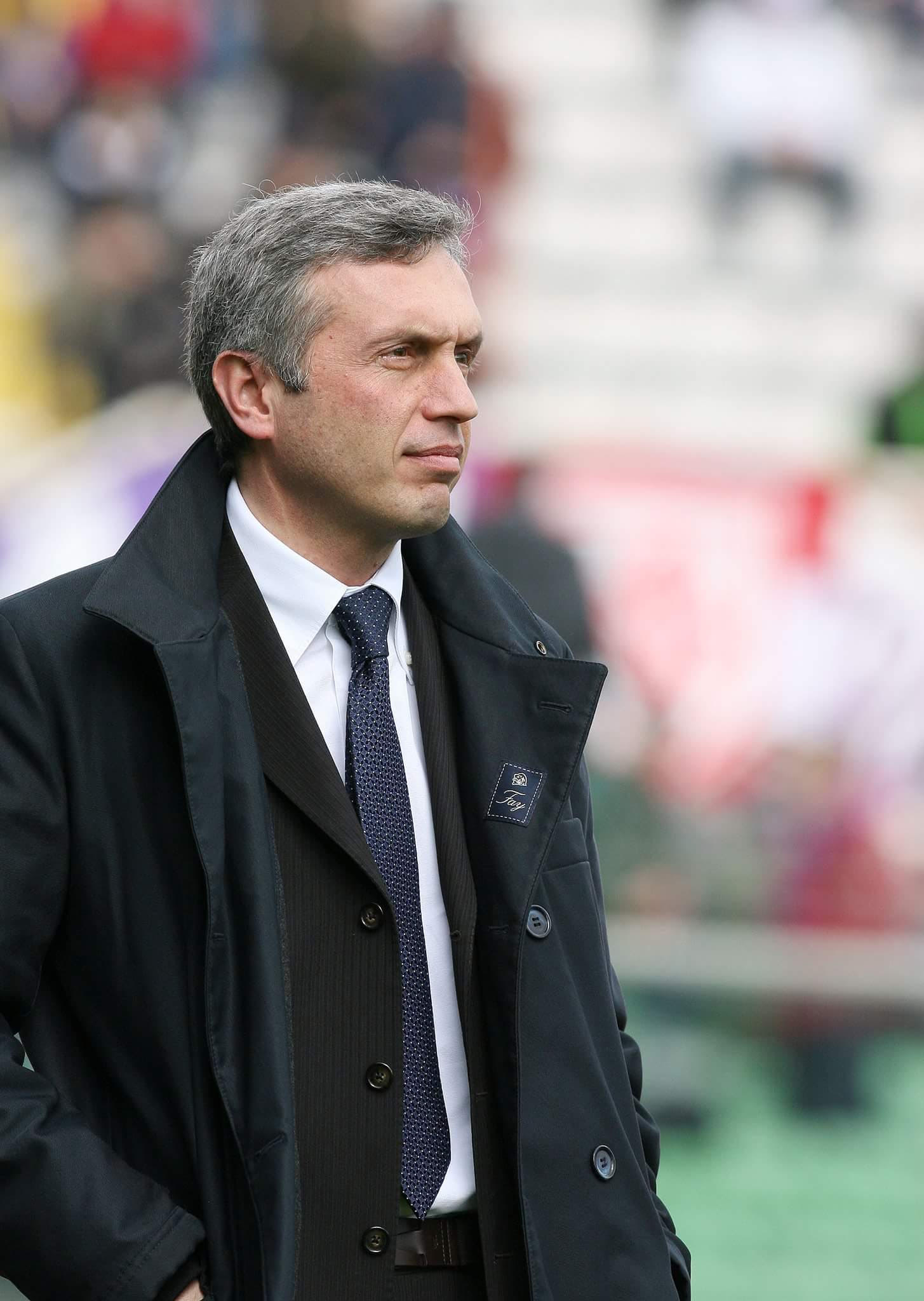
- Born: July 18, 1961 (age 65); Florence, Italy
- Occupation: International sports executive
- Years active: 2002–present (24 years)
- Employer: U.S. Lecce, Leeds United, ACF Fiorentina
- Height: 6 ft 1 in (1.85 m)
- Title: Chief Executive Officer

Sandro Mencucci (Italian: [meŋˈkuttʃi]) is an Italian businessman and senior international sports executive. Mencucci is currently CEO of U.S. Lecce football club who competes in the top tier Italian Serie A from May 2022. He previously was CEO and a board director of the Italian Serie A football club ACF Fiorentina from August 2002 to 2019.

He has also served on the Board of Directors of Leeds United Football Club and helped contribute in July 2020 to the club’s historic promotion back to the Premier League following a 16 year hiatus in the English Football League Championship.

== Sports executive career ==
=== US Lecce ===
Mencucci was sought out to return to the helm as CEO of the newly promoted, U.S. Lecce in May 2022 when they won the 2021–22 Serie B Championship. He immediately contributed his leadership by creating a new economic model for Italian Serie A clubs whereby U.S. Lecce has been recognized for their solution to “financial sustainability” - valorization of talent, balancing financial sustainability returning to profit and self-sufficiency from shareholders based on organically working with the Sports Division.

=== ACF Fiorentina ===
A chartered accountant and fiscal lawyer by profession, Mencucci joined ACF Fiorentina as CEO and board director in the summer of 2002 when the Della Valle Family, owners of the fashion brands Tod's, Fay, Hogan and Roger Vivier, acquired the defaulted club and initiated a new entity starting from the 4th tier Serie C2. They set out to build the club from the ground up without any existing structure and with the modest capital of 6 million euros. During his tenure, Mencucci and the Della Valle family increased the budget from the initial 6 million to over 100 million euros annually.

In 2007, Mencucci became the president of the Promesse Viola Srl, the official youth academy for the club. In 2014, Mencucci, became the President of International Development Players LLC, a youth development academy under the guidance of the youth sector division of the club with its headquarters in the United States. In 2015, Mencucci became president of the Fiorentina Fiorentina Women's Football Club, the first-ever professionally affiliated women's football club in the history of Italy. In 2017, Fiorentina won the 2016-17 Serie A. This is the first Tricolore for ACF Fiorentina since May 6, 1969, and it is the first Serie A championship under the previous ownership of Andre Delle Valle. On June 17, 2017, Fiorentina won its first double since 1926 when the women's division won the Coppa Italia.

In November 2017, Mencucci was inducted into the Fiorentina Hall of Fame in a ceremony organized by the Museo Fiorentina and ACF Fiorentina.

=== Philosophy ===
During his seventeen-year tenure as CEO at ACF Fiorentina, Mencucci implemented the vision of Della Valle family, the "Fiorentina Model", which emphasized economic equilibrium, technical competence, investment in the youth sector and the promotion of a positive sports culture formally implemented in 2007 as a "fair play culture" making Fiorentina a model Club for the Italian League and for the world. The principal objective is to promote Fair Play, the value of playing sports with respect for the adversary and fans. Mencucci led the club from its initial insertion into Serie C2, Italian fourth division, to its promotion back to Serie A in 2004. The club qualified for three consecutive years for the UEFA Europa League and has held one of the top four positions in the Italian Serie A league for the last three consecutive seasons. The club also qualified for the 2008–09 UEFA Champions League and again in 2009–10, where they were eliminated in the round of 16 by Bayern Munich, but recorded wins home and away, over Liverpool in the group stages. During the summer of 2014, Mencucci led the club in the 2014 Copa EuroAmericana and in the summer of 2015, Fiorentina participated in the 2015 International Champions Cup.

Mencucci implemented the Della Valle initiative and became the first Serie A club to financially sustain a non-profit association, Save the Children. Since 2009, Fiorentina has made donations of €250,000.00 per year to Save the Children. From 2010, the club had displayed the non-profit's logo on the Fiorentina jersey in place of the main sponsor for 7 consecutive seasons.

=== International Initiatives ===
==== Youth Division ====
Since 2007, Mencucci led all of ACF Fiorentina's international initiatives, which were first launched in the United States of America and were designed to identify young talented players and spread the expertise and culture of the club. As part of the initiatives, the club provided European soccer training and expertise for pre-professional development of talented young U.S. soccer players and coaches. In 2012, the development academy and the Fiorentina Model expanded to Switzerland. He has also been engaged in further initiatives in the United States, Switzerland, India, Vietnam, China and Japan.

From 2007 to 2019, Mencucci was president of the Promesse Viola, the development academy for the Italian youth sector. Mencucci dedicated himself to the creation of this innovative youth initiative recognized in Italy and worldwide with the principal aim to develop and train talented professional footballers by providing athletes from 10 to 19 years old technical-sporting development. The youth sector consisted of 12 teams from under-10 to under-19, 250 athletes and had an annual budget of approximately 5 million euro.

==== Indian Soccer League ====
In 2013, Fiorentina together with other Italian teams helped to form the Indian Super League (ISL) with aims to provide stimulus to the growth and development of football in the state of Maharashtra. Mencucci helped form FC Pune City in 2014, which participated in the ISL in its inaugural season.

==== Women's Division ====
In addition to his role as CEO of the Fiorentina’s men’s division, from 2015 to 2019, Mencucci spearheaded a professional football initiative for women athletes of the Della Valle family as president of the Fiorentina Women's Football Club, the first ever professionally affiliated women's football club in the history of Italy. In only four years the Fiorentina Women's FC won four titles. Fiorentina qualified to participate in the UEFA Women's Champions League in successive seasons (2017–18 and 2018–19).
