= Pierre Delaunay =

French football executive (1919–2019)

UEFA General Secretary
- In office 1955–1960
- Preceded by: Henri Delaunay
- Succeeded by: Hans Bangerter

Personal details
- Born: 9 October 1919 Paris, France
- Died: 23 January 2019 (aged 99) Le Chesnay, France

Pierre Delaunay (9 October 1919 – 23 January 2019) was the second General Secretary of UEFA. He succeeded his father Henri Delaunay in the post, on an interim basis from his father's death on 9 November 1955 and then officially from 8 June 1956. He died in Versailles on 23 January 2019, aged 99.

Preceded by Henri Delaunay	UEFA General Secretary; 1955–1960	Succeeded by Hans Bangerter
