= Gerhard Aigner =

German football executive (1943–2024)

UEFA General Secretary
- In office 1989–1999
- Preceded by: Hans Bangerter

UEFA Chief Executive
- In office 1999–2003
- Succeeded by: Lars-Christer Olsson

Personal details
- Born: 1 September 1943 Regensburg, Gau Bayreuth, Germany
- Died: 20 June 2024 (aged 80)
- Known for: Chairman of Euro-Sportring

Gerhard Aigner (1 September 1943 – 20 June 2024) was a German football executive. Formerly a referee, Aigner became General Secretary of UEFA on 22 September 1989. The position of the General Secretary was renamed to Chief Executive on 3 March 1999. He retired from the post in November 2003.

Beginning in 2006, Aigner was a board member of Euro-Sportring and in 2010 he became the chairman. Euro-Sportring is a non-profit foundation that organizes international sports tournaments in Europe, particularly for youth teams of amateur clubs.

Aigner was an honorary member of UEFA. He died on 20 June 2024, at the age of 80.

== See also ==
- Erich Gehbauer

Preceded by Hans Bangerter	UEFA General Secretary; 1989–1999	Succeeded by Gerhard Aigner
Preceded by Gerhard Aigner	UEFA Chief Executive; 1999–2003	Succeeded by Lars-Christer Olsson
