= 2006 FIFA World Cup final =

World Cup final match, held in Germany

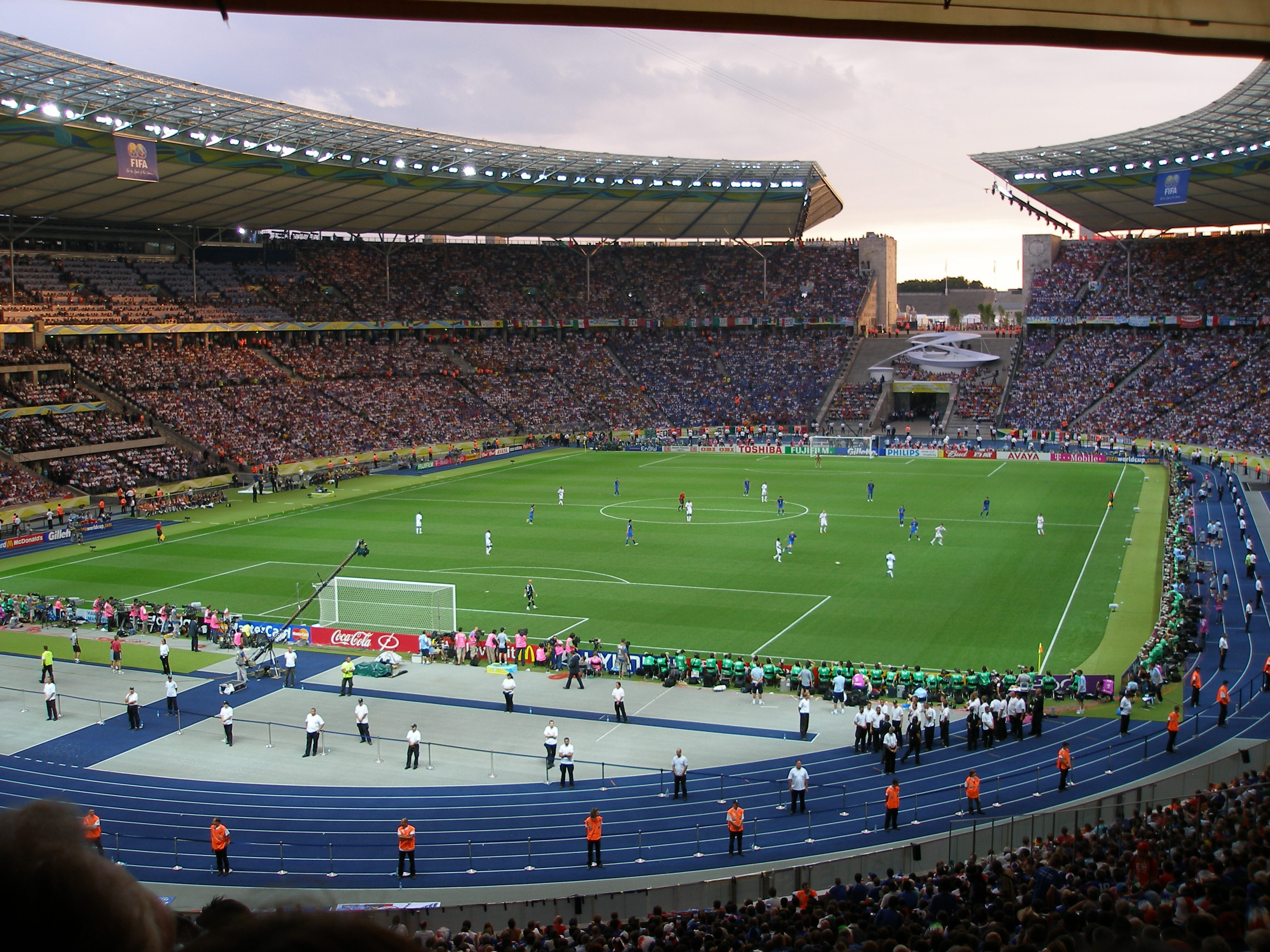
- A scene inside the Olympiastadion during the first half of the match.
- Event: 2006 FIFA World Cup
Italy	France
1	1
- After extra time Italy won 5–3 on penalties
- Date: 9 July 2006
- Venue: Olympiastadion, Berlin
- Man of the Match: Andrea Pirlo (Italy)
- Referee: Horacio Elizondo (Argentina)
- Attendance: 69,000
- Weather: Clear; 27 °C (81 °F); 42% humidity

The final match of the 2006 FIFA World Cup, the 18th edition of FIFA's competition for national football teams, was played at the Olympiastadion in Berlin, Germany, on 9 July 2006, and was contested between Italy and France. The event comprised hosts Germany and 31 other teams who emerged from the qualification phase, organised by the six FIFA confederations. The 32 teams competed in a group stage, from which 16 teams qualified for the knockout stage.

En route to the final, Italy had to deal with the aftermath of the Calciopoli and public boycotts. Despite this, Italy finished first in Group E, with two wins and a draw, after which they defeated Australia in the round of 16, Ukraine in the quarter-final, and Germany 2–0 in the semi-final. Suffering from underperformance, France finished runner-up of Group G with one win and two draws, before defeating Spain in the round of 16, Brazil in the quarter-final, and Portugal 1–0 in the semi-final. The final was witnessed by 69,000 spectators in the stadium, with the referee for the match being Horacio Elizondo from Argentina.

Italy won the World Cup after beating France 5–3 in a penalty shoot-out following a 1–1 draw at the conclusion of extra time. The match was focused mostly on France's Zinedine Zidane and Italy's Marco Materazzi: this was the last match of Zidane's career, they each scored their team's only goal of the game, and they were also involved in an incident in extra time that led to Zidane being sent off for headbutting Materazzi in the chest. The Zidane–Materazzi incident was the subject of much analysis following the match. Italy's Andrea Pirlo was named the man of the match, and Zidane was awarded the FIFA World Cup Golden Ball as the best player of the tournament.

The final served as a key match in the France–Italy football rivalry, coming after Italy were defeated by France in the UEFA Euro 2000 final. Italy's victory was their first world title in 24 years, and their fourth overall, putting them one ahead of Germany and only one behind Brazil. For the first time since November 1993, Italy topped the FIFA World Rankings in February 2007 as a result of the win. With eight football players from Juventus in the final, it equalled the record of Sparta Prague in 1934. Both sides would fail to get past the group stage in 2010, becoming the first set of finalists to do so, while Italy became the third World Cup champions to be eliminated from the group phase after Brazil in 1966 and France in 2002. As of 2026, this is the last knockout stage match played by Italy in the tournament, having gone out in the groups in 2014 before failing to qualify since.

== Background ==
=== Venue ===
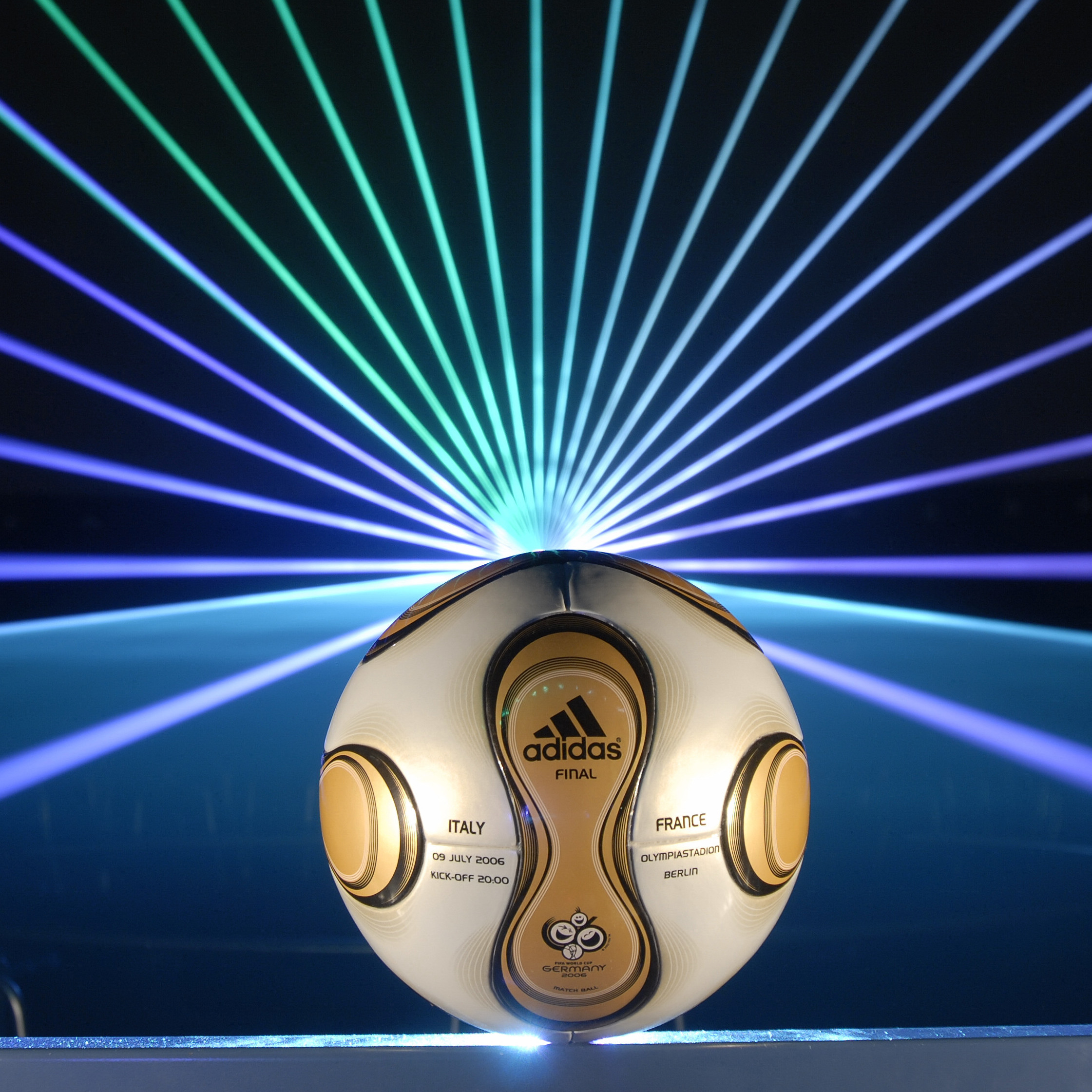
An example of the Adidas +Teamgeist Berlin ball used in the match

The Olympiastadion in Berlin was used as the venue for the final, as well as five other matches over the tournament. It was also used for three matches at the 1974 World Cup. The Olympiastadion was built for the 1936 Summer Olympics in the western part of the city. Since 1985, the stadium has hosted the finals of both the DFB-Pokal and its female equivalent. The Olympiastadion hosts the Internationales Stadionfest, which was an IAAF Golden League event from 1998 to 2009. The stadium hosted the 2009 World Championships in Athletics. Aside from its use as an Olympic stadium, the Olympiastadion has a strong footballing tradition, having been the home of Hertha BSC since 1963.

=== Italy–France rivalry ===
Italy's first official match as a national team was against France on 15 May 1910, and the two countries developed a football rivalry. They have faced each other in several world-stage tournaments, including previous World Cups in 1938 (3–1 Italy), 1978 (2–1 Italy), 1986 (2–0 France), and 1998 (4–3 in penalty shoot-out to France). Most recently, they had contested the UEFA Euro 2000 final, which ended in a 2–1 victory for France after a golden goal in extra time by David Trezeguet.

The match was the sixth FIFA World Cup final for Italy and the second for France. Italy had won three of their previous finals (1934, 1938, 1982), losing two (1970, 1994), while France had won their only previous final (1998). It was the first final since 1978 in which neither Germany nor Brazil competed and only the second since 1938; it was also the first all-European final since Italy won the World Cup in 1982 and the second final to be decided by a penalty shoot-out (1994 was the first, with Italy losing to Brazil on that occasion). It was also the first final since 1938 in which neither Germany, Brazil nor Argentina competed.

=== Zidane's announced retirement and Serie A scandal ===
In April 2006, France's Zinedine Zidane, who at the time played for Spanish league side Real Madrid and also previously served for the Italian league side Juventus, announced his retirement from football, saying his playing career would end after the World Cup. Considered "one of the greatest footballers ever" and at the time still the "world's most expensive player", his honours list included a Ballon d'Or, three FIFA World Player of the Year awards, and FIFA World Cup, UEFA European Championship, UEFA Champions League, La Liga, and Serie A winners' medals. In May 2006, Italy's Serie A league was hit by Calciopoli, a controversial scandal mainly surrounding Juventus (judged in rushed proceedings lasting two months and 12 days to make way for the World Cup and the 2006–2007 football season), (Note: The sports proceedings were controversial, especially in regards to Juventus but also with the ad personam decision by the then FIGC extrordinary commissioner and former member of the Inter Milan board Guido Rossi and his appointed experts to assign the scudetto to third-placed Inter Milan. The handling and decisions by sports justice attracted significant criticism, including from the former Constitutional Court of Italy judge and president Antonio Baldassarre, Totonero head of the investigation office and former FIGC judge Corrado De Biase, former FIGC judge Giuseppe Benedetto who resigned in protest, journalists like Enzo Biagi (widely considered a giant of Italian journalism), the future Linkiesta editor-in-chief Christian Rocca, and prominent investigative journalist Oliviero Beha (who had coined the term Moggiopoli at the outbreak of the scandal and later became a prominent critic of how it was handled), politicians like the former prime minister and president Francesco Cossiga, lawyers like the well known Inter Milan supporter and future Milan mayor Giuliano Pisapia, and former Milan and Italy manager Arrigo Sacchi, and trial by media and kangaroo court accusations, with comparisons to the Inquisition (especially the Spanish Inquisition) and totalitarian states.) a team to which five of the national squad players belonged, before in later years it emerged that virtually all Serie A clubs were involved but time-barred, causing a controversy between Juventus, Inter Milan, and the Italian Football Federation (FIGC) that lasted for the next two decades over unequal treatment.

In July 2006, amnesty calls by various individuals, including politicians across the political spectrum in a polarised climate, as had been done in the early 1980s prior to Italy winning its third World Cup, were ultimately rejected in a public and media climate of "guilty until proven innocent", and many were openly cheering against Italy. Moreover, part of the media and several individuals, including the then minister Giovanna Melandri, had called for Italy manager and Juventus players to be excluded from the World Cup. Lippi and all Juventus players were subsequently cleared of any wrongdoing. (Note: The Calciopoli criminal trials in Rome (GEA World) and Naples (club directors) were largely based on circumstantial evidence and especially the trials in Naples proved controversial, and respectively concluded with acquittals and the statute of limitations for all defendants in relations to charges of criminal conspiracy. The first-instance trial in Naples had concluded that there had been no match fixing in favour of Juventus (in line with the sports proceedings) and thus the league standings had not been altered. This latter point contradicted the decision of sports justice, leading to calls for a revision of the decision by sports justice. According to the sports proceedings, that Juventus had altered the league standings, even without fixing a single match (a logic strongly criticised), with no direct Article 6 violation warranting relegation, significantly aggravated the club's position, and thus it caused the controversial relegation of Juventus to Serie B for the first time in its history and the revocation of the two scudetti won by the club on the pitch, including one that was never an object of investigation and that was assigned to third-placed Inter Milan, which was subsequently heavily implicated in the scandal. This and other key arguments that were instrumental in the 2006 decision were ultimately rebuked by the criminal trials. This specific part of the reasonings (no match fixing and league standings not altered) was definitely confirmed by Italy's Supreme Court of Cassation in 2015 and 2025.) That so many players in the final were from Juventus was cited by club supporters and commentators, including some critics of the club and other figures, such as the then FIGC president Franco Carraro, the then Juventus manager Fabio Capello, and the then Juventus player Zlatan Ibrahimović, to argue that Juventus was the strongest team and had legitimately won on the pitch back-to-back the 2004–2005 Serie A and the 2005–2006 Serie A revoked league titles. (Note: Marcello Lippi had been a successful manager at Juventus from 1994 to 1999 and from 2001 to 2004, when he took over the role as manager of Italy. Among Juventus players in the final were Gianluigi Buffon, Gianluca Zambrotta, Fabio Cannavaro, and Mauro Camoranesi as starters for Italy, with club captain and legend Alessandro Del Piero as substitute and starter Simone Perrotta as a former player, and Lilian Thuram and Patrick Viera as starters for France, with David Trezequet as substitute. Moreover, France starters Zinedine Zidane and Thierry Henry had both been at Juventus in the late 1990s and Italy players, such as Fabio Grosso, Andrea Pirlo, Luca Toni (starters), and Vincenzo Iaquinta (substitute) would all move to Juventus in subsequent years, while other key Juventus players in the 2006 World Cup were the 2003 Ballon d'Or winner Pavel Nedvěd for Czech Republic and Zlatan Ibrahimović for Sweden. Among Italy technical staff, an often cited figure from Juventus was the masseur Aldo Esposito, further underling the contributions of Juventus, which as of the 2022 World Cup was the club with the largest number of players to have won the FIFA World Club, extending its lead. When including the manager, the technical staff, and all the players acquired by the then Juventus management (Luciano Moggi as general manager, Antonio Giraudo as CEO, and former Juventus captain and club legend Roberto Bettega as vice-chairman), which brought the club to success and dominance since 1994 and reached both its apotheosis and its fall in 2006, the final had at least 17 individuals linked to Juventus.) While some individuals like the then FIGC extraordinary commissioner Guido Rossi publicly supported Lippi, many noted the hypocrisy of those who celebrated the win of Italy when they had cheered against the national squad or had called for Juventus figures to be excluded (including Lippi, who ultimately did not renew his managerial contract as a result of this), explicitily citing the case of Melandri.

== Road to the final ==
Italy
Round
France
Opponents
Results
Group stage
Opponents
Results
Ghana
2–0
Match 1
Switzerland
0–0
United States
1–1
Match 2
South Korea
1–1
Czech Republic
2–0
Match 3
Togo
2–0
Group E winners

Team	Pld	W	D	L	GF	GA	GD	Pts
Italy	3	2	1	0	5	1	+4	7
Ghana	3	2	0	1	4	3	+1	6
Czech Republic	3	1	0	2	3	4	−1	3
United States	3	0	1	2	2	6	−4	1

Final standings
Group G runners-up

Team	Pld	W	D	L	GF	GA	GD	Pts
Switzerland	3	2	1	0	4	0	+4	7
France	3	1	2	0	3	1	+2	5
South Korea	3	1	1	1	3	4	−1	4
Togo	3	0	0	3	1	6	−5	0

Opponents
Results
Knockout stage
Opponents
Results
Australia
1–0
Round of 16
Spain
3–1
Ukraine
3–0
Quarter-finals
Brazil
1–0
Germany
2–0 (a.e.t.)
Semi-finals
Portugal
1–0

=== Squads analysis ===
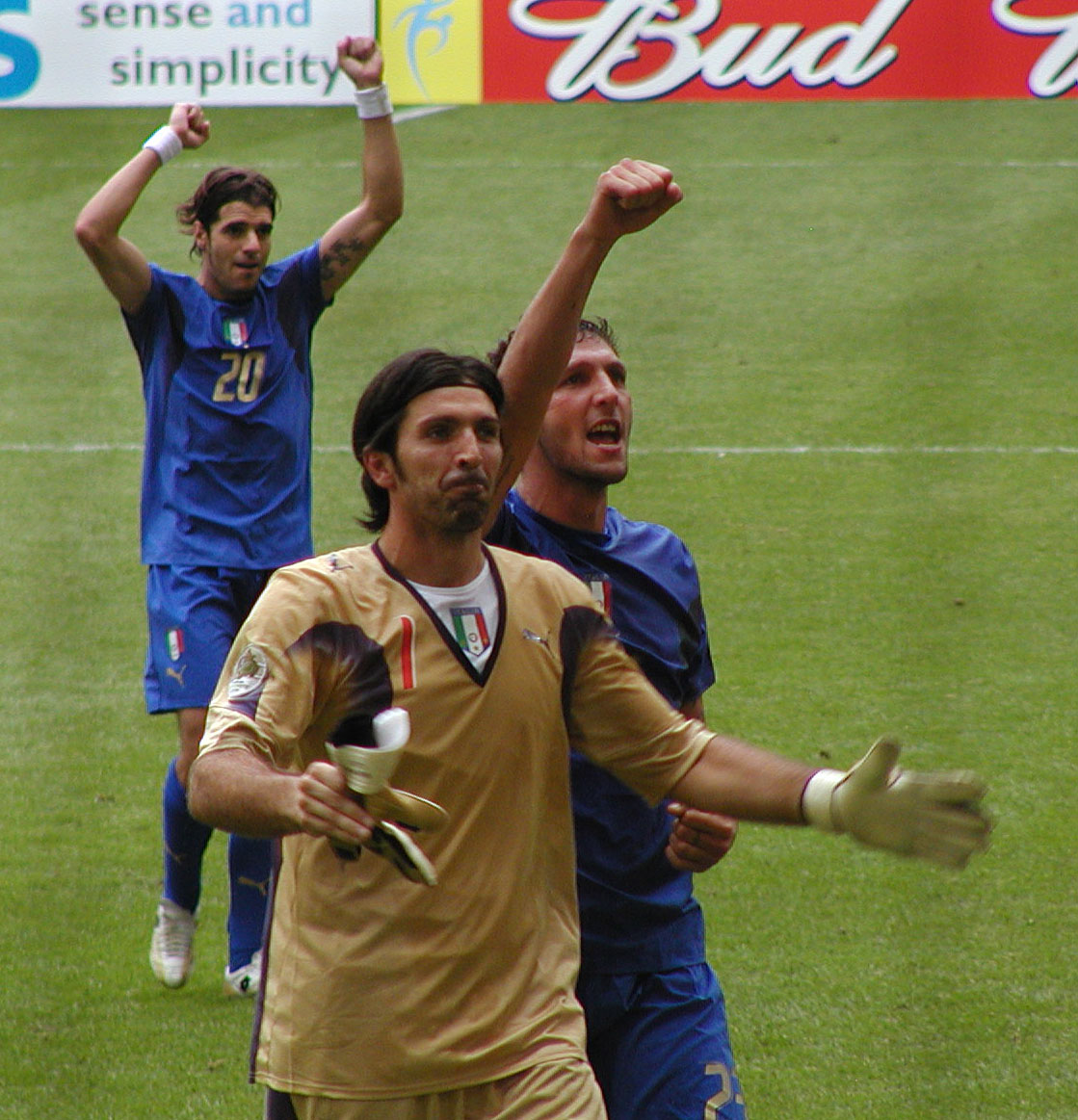
Italian players Gianluigi Buffon, Marco Materazzi, and Simone Perrotta celebrate Italy's qualification for the round of 16 at the end of the group stage match against the Czech Republic.

Italy and France met again six years after the Euro 2000 final and eight years after their last meeting in a World Cup tournament, the quarter-finals of the 1998 World Cup, both of which had been won by France. Once the final tournament began, Italy managed to isolate themselves from the aforementioned scandal and reached the knockout stage without major difficulties, following a group stage campaign in Group E that saw them secure two wins and a draw, respectively against Ghana (2–0), the United States (1–1), and the Czech Republic (2–0). Nonetheless, these initial matches were not without issues for Lippi's men: Daniele De Rossi received a four-match ban for elbowing American player Brian McBride, while Alessandro Nesta ended his World Cup tournament early due to a serious injury sustained during the match against the Czechs.

In the round of 16, the Azzurri struggled more than expected to defeat Australia (1–0), prevailing only thanks to a penalty converted by Francesco Totti in stoppage time, while the comfortable quarter-final victory over Andriy Shevchenko's Ukraine (3–0) went according to predictions. In the semi-final, the hosts and three-time world champions Germany succumbed to the Azzurri (0–2) following a late one-two punch by Fabio Grosso and Alessandro Del Piero at the very end of extra time.

A defining characteristic of the Italian squad was the continuous rotation of starting players. With the exception of the two backup goalkeepers, Angelo Peruzzi and Marco Amelia, every other selected player was fielded at least once. Throughout the tournament, the attacking line-up alternated between Del Piero, Alberto Gilardino, Vincenzo Iaquinta, Filippo Inzaghi, Luca Toni, and Totti, supported by a solid midfield and above all a nearly impenetrable defence (conceding only one goal, which was an own goal), with goalkeeper Gianluigi Buffon remaining unbeaten for 453 minutes. After the semi-final with Germany, Gianni Mura, one of Italy's leading sports journalists, celebrated the Azzurri by associating each player with a colour and a wine. He compared Materazzi to Nero d'Avola with these words: "Here too, the assonance has played a part. It is a wine of resolute character that has boosted the reputation of bottled Sicilian wine. If you do not watch your step, it will floor you. Just like Materazzi, precisely."

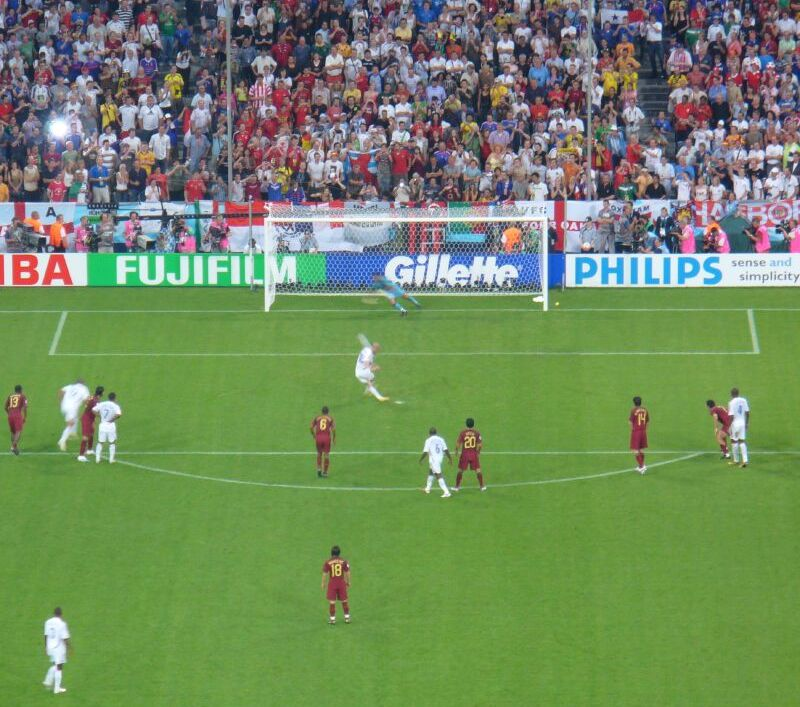
Zinedine Zidane's penalty against Portugal, which sealed France's qualification for the final in Berlin.

The Bleus secured second place in Group G with some difficulty, recording two draws and a victory against Switzerland (0–0), South Korea (1–1), and Togo (2–0). Even during these first three matches, France displayed physical and technical limitations, and Domenech was not immune to criticism: among other things, the manager made no secret of aligning the team partly based on astrological signs, and regularly left David Trezeguet—generally considered one of the finest forwards of his generation—on the bench for both tactical reasons, favouring a system with Thierry Henry as a lone striker, and specifically for reasons related to astrology.

With several players still remaining from the 1998 World Cup victory, the squad was accused of being old and worn out—or "old and toothless", as Spain manager Luis Aragonés put it. In the knockout stage, carried by a rejuvenated Zidane (who had been quiet until then), the French overcame Spain (3–1) in the round of 16, defending champions Brazil (1–0) in the quarter-finals, and Luís Figo's Portugal in the semi-final (1–0), which featured a young Cristiano Ronaldo in his first World Cup experience.

=== Italy ===
Italy's campaign in the tournament was accompanied by open pessimism, in large part due to the controversy caused by the Serie A scandal. Italy arrived at the 2006 World Cup in a decidedly complicated situation. During that year, the world of Italian football had been heavily shaken by the Calciopoli scandal, during which a series of relationships between club directors and representatives of the refereeing class had emerged, limited to the 2004–2005 Serie A season. It later emerged that these relations, which were not limited to the Italian league and were formally banned across Europe only in the aftermath of the scandal following the example of Italy, had been encouraged by the FIGC itself and the then FIGC president Franco Carraro in order to promote good relations among clubs and avoid further controversies, such as complaining in public about referees. The club most affected by sports justice was Juventus, the only club to be relegated to Serie B despite similar violations to the other four Serie A clubs (Fiorentina, Lazio, Milan, and Reggina) initially involved in the scandal.

Perhaps the most famous scandal of match-fixing in association football, such as that the prosecution spoke of many fixed matches and multiple leagues that had been altered through corrupted referees and rigged drawing lots, all of which were widely publicised by the press and taken for granted by the public, the sentences ultimately debunked these allegations, with no match fixing, no involved players (unlike previous and subsequent match-fixing scandals), no corrupted referees, no exchange or trace of money involved, and no rigged drawing lots. Ultimately, Calciopoli was about alleged violations and early consumation crimes (sporting fraud) that instead revolved around the referee grids, which were discussed between the referee designators and most clubs (which was allowed by the FIGC or at least it was not explicitily against the rules at the time), did not affect the game as they were significantly preliminary (as also found by the Public Prosecutor's Office of Turin in 2004) and there would still be a drawing lot procedure (found to be regular), and were easily predictable due to the preclusion rules. As often happened in the history of the Azzurri, also in this case the Bianconeri represented the backbone of the Italian national team, managed on this occasion by Marcello Lippi, a historic ex-Juventus manager; Lippi himself, with a son (Davide Lippi) who was an agent linked to the GEA World, a sports agent company that was implicated in the scandal but whose members were ultimately acquitted from criminal conspiracy charges in the criminal trials in Rome, was the target of a media campaign aimed at pushing him to resign for reasons of expediency, with many even calling for Italy's exclusion from the World Cup.

Italy were drawn in Group E alongside Ghana, the United States, and Czech Republic, opening against Ghana on 12 June 2006. Italy took the lead through midfielder Andrea Pirlo in the 40th minute, eventually winning the match by a score of 2–0. In their next match against the United States on 17 June, Italy took the lead in the 22nd minute with an Alberto Gilardino goal, but five minutes later Cristian Zaccardo scored an own goal off an attempted clearance following a free-kick, and the match eventually remained a 1–1 draw; this was one of only two goals Italy conceded throughout the tournament. In that match, Daniele De Rossi received a straight red card after he elbowed Brian McBride in the face; he left the pitch bloodied, but returned after treatment, later receiving three stitches. De Rossi later apologised to McBride, who subsequently praised him as "classy" for approaching him after the match. Because of the incident, De Rossi was banned for four matches and was fined CHF 10,000. Their third and final group stage match was against Czech Republic on 22 June. Marco Materazzi, who had begun the tournament as a reserve player, came on as a replacement for Alessandro Nesta who suffered an injury in the match. Materazzi went on to score a goal in the match, and was named Man of the Match of an eventual 2–0 win, finishing top of the group with seven points.

In the round of 16 on 26 June, Italy took on Australia in a match in which Materazzi was controversially sent off in the 53rd minute after an attempted two-footed tackle on Australian midfielder Mark Bresciano. In stoppage time, a controversial penalty kick was awarded to Italy when referee Luis Medina Cantalejo ruled that Lucas Neill fouled Fabio Grosso. Francesco Totti converted the kick into the upper corner of the goal past Mark Schwarzer for a 1–0 win. FIFA president Sepp Blatter later conceded that the penalty decision was a refereeing mistake and apologised to Australian fans, saying that he believed there was "too much cheating on the players' side" and that Australia should have reached the quarter-finals instead of Italy. In the quarter-final on 30 June, Italy took on Ukraine, and Gianluca Zambrotta opened the scoring early in the 6th minute with a left-footed shot from outside the penalty area after a quick exchange with Totti created enough space. Luca Toni added two more goals for Italy in the second half, but as Ukraine pressed forward, they were unable to score. Ukraine had hit the crossbar, had several shots saved by Italy goalkeeper Gianluigi Buffon, and were denied a goal from a goal-line clearance from Zambrotta, ultimately ending in a 3–0 win for Italy. In the semi-final on 4 July, Italy beat hosts Germany 2–0 with the two goals coming in the last two minutes of extra time. After a back-and-forth half-hour of extra time, during which Gilardino and Zambrotta struck the post and the crossbar respectively, Grosso scored in the 119th minute after a disguised Pirlo pass found him open in the penalty area for a bending left-footed shot into the far corner past German goalkeeper Jens Lehmann's dive. Substitute striker Alessandro Del Piero then sealed the victory by scoring with a right-footed shot, avenging his mistake in the 2000 Euro final and a period of underperformance with the national squad, in what was the last kick of the game at the end of a swift counterattack by Fabio Cannavaro, Totti, and Gilardino.

=== France ===
France was going through a difficult time on the sporting side. After being eliminated from the UEFA Euro 2004 by Otto Rehhagel's outsider Greece, the eventual winners of the tournament, manager Jacques Santini had been removed from the Bleus bench and replaced by Raymond Domenech, who was charged with carrying out a generational change that could no longer be postponed; however, the first qualifying matches for the 2006 World Cup had given inconsistent results for France, who managed to obtain the qualification only thanks to the subsequent return to the team of veterans Claude Makélélé, Lilian Thuram, and Zinédine Zidane, who had previously announced their retirement from the national team on several occasions. On the eve of the tournament, rumours also circulated of a divided dressing room, as well as of a bad relationship between Domenech and some players.

France were drawn in Group G alongside Switzerland, South Korea, and Togo, opening against Switzerland on 13 June 2006. The match ended in a scoreless draw. In their next match against South Korea on 18 June, France took the lead in the 9th minute after Thierry Henry picked up Sylvain Wiltord's deflected shot. Later, a header by Patrick Vieira crossed the goal-line after being blocked by Korean goalkeeper Lee Woon-Jae, but referee Benito Archundia did not give the goal as he had deemed Vieira to have committed a foul. With about 10 minutes left, Park Ji-sung scored for Korea to claim an eventual 1–1 draw. Their third and final group stage match was against Togo on 23 June, and France needed a victory to progress from the group stage. After a goalless first half, Vieira and Henry scored two second half goals within six minutes of each other to win 2–0, and finish second in the group with five points.

In the round of 16 on 27 June, France took on Spain in a match in which Spain took the lead in the first half with a penalty kick converted by David Villa after Thuram fouled Pablo. Four minutes before half time, Franck Ribéry equalised the score, and with seven minutes before the end of regulation time, Vieira scored from a header for France to take the lead. As Spain pushed forward to find an equaliser, Zidane scored in a solo effort in stoppage time, for a final score of 3–1 for France. In the quarter-final on 1 July, France took on Brazil; France won with a lone goal in the 57th minute by Henry after he volleyed a Zidane free kick to end Brazil's reign as world champions. In the semi-final against Portugal on 5 July, France won again with a lone goal, this time from a first half Zidane penalty kick after Henry was tripped inside the box by Ricardo Carvalho.

== Pre-match ==
The official match ball for the final was the + Teamgeist Berlin, a gold-coloured variation of the Adidas Teamgeist, which was unveiled on 18 April 2006. The Adidas Teamgeist was used as the official match ball throughout the tournament, provided by German sports equipment company Adidas. On 6 July 2006, Argentine Horacio Elizondo was chosen as referee for the final, ahead of German Markus Merk and Slovak Ľuboš Micheľ. Elizondo became a referee in 1994 and refereed his first international match in 1996. His compatriots, Darío García and Rodolfo Otero, were chosen as assistant referees, and the Spanish Luis Medina Cantalejo as fourth official. Elizondo had given England striker Wayne Rooney a red card against Portugal previously in the tournament. Given the presence of four European semi-finalists, the FIFA refereeing committee deemed that refereeing crews for the final four matches should not consist of officials from that continent. For Elizondo, it was his fifth match of the 2006 World Cup and his first officiating either of the two finalists.

Italy's team doctor Enrico Castellacci confirmed on 6 July that Alessandro Nesta was ruled out of the final due to a groin injury he sustained against the Czech Republic on 22 June; France reported no injuries. Before the match started, a closing ceremony was organised by FIFA, lasting about 10 minutes and featuring Il Divo singing their song "The Time of Our Lives", which was the official song of the 2006 World Cup, as well as Shakira and Wyclef Jean singing a rendition of their song "Hips Don't Lie".

Unable to test the pitch at the Olympiastadion in Berlin, which had been softened by rain, Lippi finalised his tactical moves at the training ground of MSV Duisburg, where he tested several players in multiple roles, especially Alessandro Del Piero in the unusual position of left wide midfielder. He also included his assistant coach Ciro Ferrara, a former Juventus defender, in the training sessions to compensate for the absence of Nesta, who failed to recover from the injury sustained against the Czechs, effectively handing his spot to Marco Materazzi, who had performed well in the tournament up to that point. Lippi ultimately confirmed the same starting eleven that had defeated Germany in the semi-final: Gianluigi Buffon in goal, Fabio Cannavaro and Materazzi as central defenders, Fabio Grosso at left-back, Gianluca Zambrotta at right-back, Gennaro Gattuso and Andrea Pirlo as central midfielders, Simone Perrotta as the left midfielder, Mauro Camoranesi as the right midfielder, Francesco Totti as the attacking midfielder, and Luca Toni as centre forward.

Just like the Azzurri, the French starting eleven offered no surprises. Domenech persisted with a formation that was in many ways a mirror image of Lippi's team: veteran Fabien Barthez in goal—preferred from the start over Grégory Coupet despite grumbles from the press—William Gallas and Lilian Thuram as central defenders, Willy Sagnol at right-back, Éric Abidal at left-back, Claude Makélélé and Patrick Vieira as central defensive midfielders, Florent Malouda as the left winger, Franck Ribéry as the right winger, and Thierry Henry as the lone striker looking to convert finalisations from Zinédine Zidane. The French manager allowed the media to watch only the first fifteen minutes of the final training session, attempting to conceal his starting line-up against Italy for as long as possible.

== Match ==
=== Summary ===
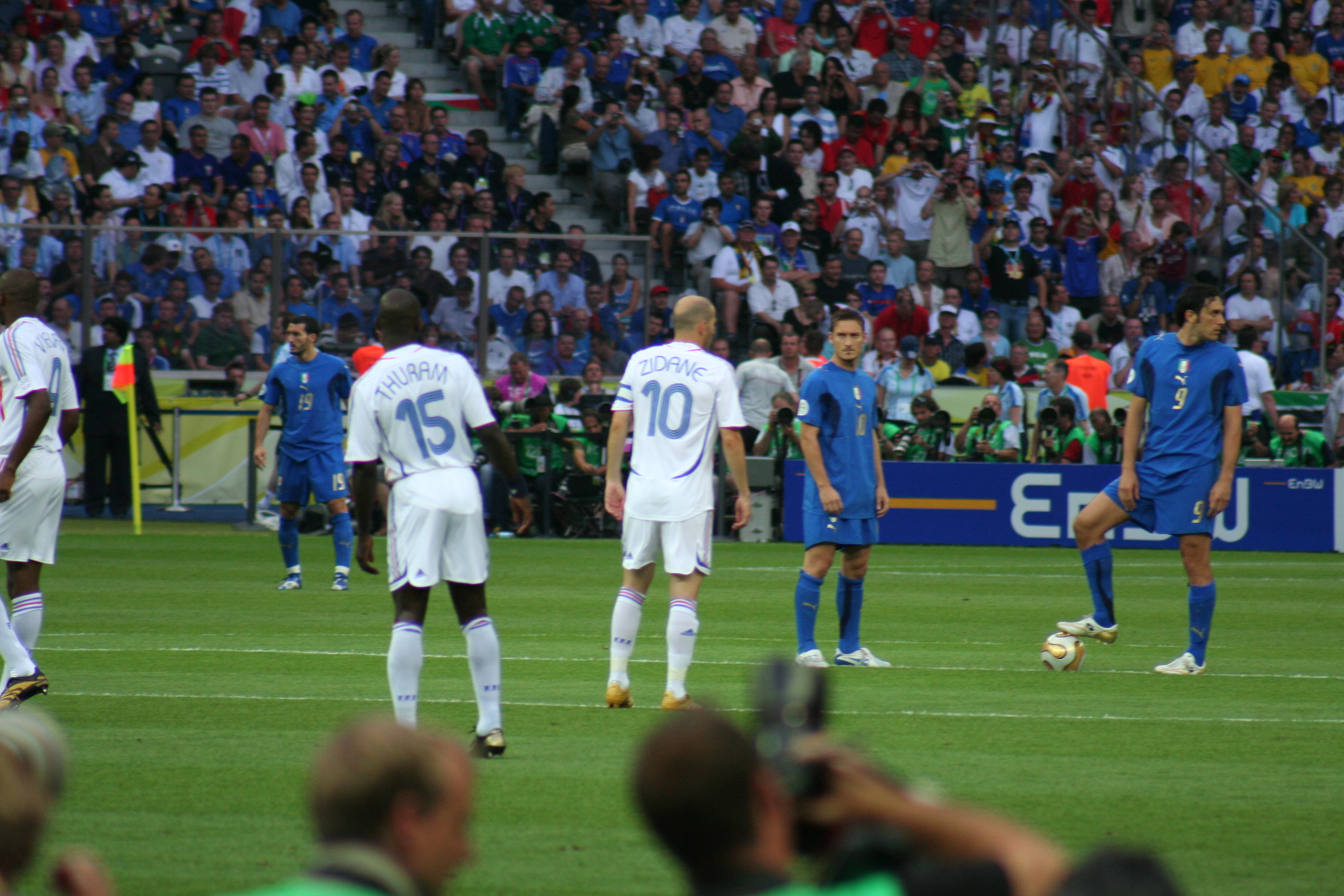
A phase of play on a dead ball, with France's Lilian Thuram and Zidane behind, and Italy's Francesco Totti and Luca Toni on the right

The final started with each side scoring within the first 20 minutes, making it the only World Cup final from 1990 to 2014 in which both finalists scored. Referee Elizondo awarded a penalty kick when he deemed Florent Malouda to have been fouled by Marco Materazzi. Zinedine Zidane opened the scoring when he converted this kick in the 7th minute with a Panenka that glanced off the underside of the crossbar and into the goal. Materazzi redeemed himself for Italy when he levelled the score in the 19th minute, a header from an Andrea Pirlo corner. In the 36th minute, Luca Toni struck the crossbar with a header from another Pirlo corner. At half time, the score was level at 1–1. The beginning of the second half was largely controlled by France, also seeking a penalty early on when Malouda went to ground in the box after a tackle by Gianluca Zambrotta. Patrick Vieira was replaced by Alou Diarra in the 56th minute due to an apparent hamstring injury. In the 62nd minute, Toni headed a goal that was disallowed for offside from a Grosso free kick. After the 90 minutes of regulation time, the score was still level at 1–1, forcing the match into extra time. In the 104th minute, Italian goalkeeper Gianluigi Buffon made a potentially game-saving save when he tipped a Zidane header over the crossbar that had been crossed in from Willy Sagnol. After first half of extra time, the score was still level at 1–1.

Players of the Italy national football team lifting the World Cup trophy

In the 108th minute, Zidane and Materazzi were jogging up the pitch alongside each other. They briefly exchanged words and Materazzi pulled at Zidane's jersey; Zidane then delivered a headbutt to Materazzi's chest, knocking him to the ground. As the game play had switched direction, Buffon protested to the assistant referee, who did not see what had happened. When the play returned and referee Elizondo saw Materazzi on the ground, he halted play to consult his assistants. According to match officials' reports, the referee and his assistants did not see what had transpired; however, Elizondo consulted fourth official Luis Medina Cantalejo via headset, who confirmed the incident. Elizondo then issued Zidane a red card in the 110th minute. It marked the 14th overall expulsion of Zidane's career and meant he joined Cameroon's Rigobert Song as the only players ever to be sent off during two separate World Cup tournaments. (Note: With his sending-off in the World Cup final, Zinedine Zidane equalled the record for the most yellow cards (Brazil's Cafu, 6) and red cards (Cameroon's Rigobert Song, 2) collected by a single player in World Cup history.) He also became the fourth player red-carded in a World Cup final, in addition to being the first sent off in extra time.

After extra time, the score was still level at 1–1, forcing the match into a penalty shoot-out. France's David Trezeguet, who had scored the golden goal against Italy in the UEFA Euro 2000 final, was the only player not to score his penalty after his kick hit the crossbar, shot down after its impact, and stayed just ahead of the goal-line. Fabio Grosso, who scored Italy's first goal in the semi-final win against Germany, scored the winning penalty and Italy won its fourth World Cup (its first since 1982) by a score of 5–3.

=== Analysis ===
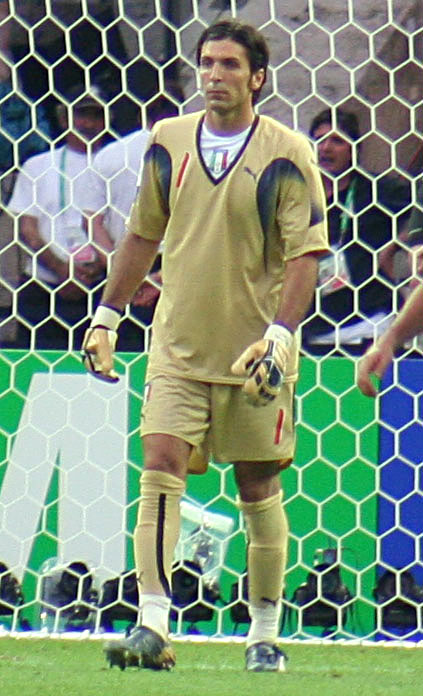
Until Zidane's penalty, Italy's goalkeeper Gianluigi Buffon had kept a clean sheet for 458 minutes.

Following the opening performance by Shakira and Wyclef Jean, who performed a special version of "Hips Don't Lie" called "The Bamboo Version", the final commenced, with Italian President Giorgio Napolitano, French President Jacques Chirac, and other political figures, including the Italian sports minister Giovanna Melandri, in attendance. The Italian and French line-ups were exactly as anticipated on the eve of the match, captained respectively by Cannavaro—one of the two Italian starters, along with Totti, who were veterans of the Euro 2000 final, and Zidane, who was playing the final match of his 19-year career. Of the 28 players who took to the pitch that night, 8 were under contract with the Italian club Juventus; in doing so, the Bianconeri equalled the record established 72 years earlier by the Czechoslovaks of Slavia Prague.

The first half was fierce and lively but above all highly physical and littered with fouls. Henry was the first to suffer from this, remaining on the ground after an accidental collision with Cannavaro just a few minutes after the opening whistle. Shortly after, the Azzurri picked up their first booking due to a foul by Zambrotta on Vieira. The deadlock was broken in the 7th minute when Frenchman Malouda won, with some astuteness, a penalty kick following a challenge from Materazzi. Zidane stepped up to the spot and attempted a Panenka-style chip, sending the ball to strike the underside of the crossbar before bouncing past the goal line, a shot against which Buffon could do nothing. For the first time during this edition of the World Cup, Italy found themselves trailing.

The Azzurri attempted to react immediately but with little success. The Italian team played stretched out and disorganised, in contrast to a more compact and tighter French formation. Thuram cut out a dangerous cross from Pirlo, Totti struggled to find space, partly due to tight marking from Makélélé and Vieira, and Grosso found it difficult to contain a dangerous and unpredictable Ribéry. Pirlo attempted to hold the reins of an Italian game that he could not dictate as fluidly as in previous matches. The equalizer came in the 19th minute, after 12 minutes of suffering, from a corner kick taken by Pirlo; Materazzi, redeeming himself for the penalty conceded earlier, outjumped Vieira and headed the ball past Barthez.

The goal energised the Azzurri. France was caught off guard by the aerial game of the Italian national side, which reduced their offensive impact and favored Italian possession. With the passing lanes closed off for Ribéry and Henry, the Italian pressing on Zidane was also highly effective. France reappeared near the opposing box in the 25th minute with a cross from Ribéry cut out by Materazzi. In the 36th minute, Toni came close to giving Italy the lead, striking the crossbar with a header from a corner kick taken by Pirlo. Around the half-hour mark of the first half, an electrical power failure shut down the giant screens inside the Olympiastadion and blanked the monitors in the press box, complicating the work of journalists. The first half, which was overall favourable to the Azzurri, concluded at 1–1.

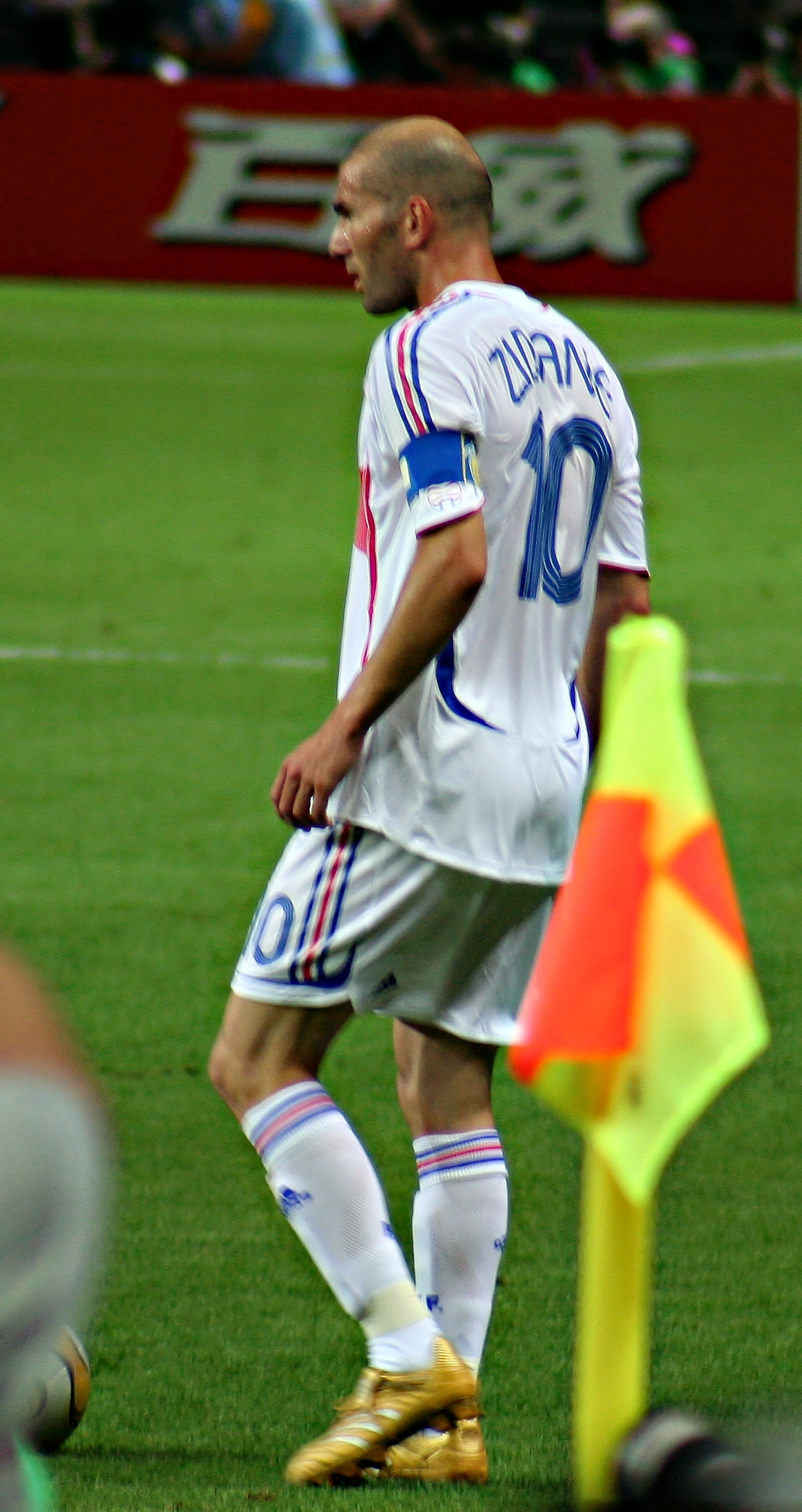
The red card received in the final was the concluding act of Zinedine Zidane's career.

The second half began without substitutions. The Azzurri sat back in defence, leaving room for the French to dictate play. Early on, a run by Henry culminated in a weak shot, saved comfortably by Buffon. In the 56th minute, France made their first change: Vieira came off due to injury and was replaced by Alou Diarra. Lippi reshaped his team by bringing on Iaquinta and De Rossi, the latter returning from his suspension, in place of the less impactful Totti and Perrotta respectively. A few seconds later, in the 62nd minute, a headed goal by Toni from a Grosso free kick was disallowed for offside. In the 79th minute, Zidane complained of severe pain in his right shoulder following a collision with Cannavaro but remained on the pitch. In the 86th minute, Lippi substituted Del Piero for a tired Camoranesi. After two minutes of stoppage time, with the score deadlocked at 1–1, the match headed into extra time.

In extra time, the teams maintained the same tactics. France engineered two highly dangerous opportunities: a shot by Ribéry in the 99th minute that flashed just wide and a powerful header from Zidane in the 104th minute that was tipped over the bar by a reflex save from Buffon, who tipped the ball over the crossbar. Domenech adjusted his formation, shifting Henry out wide and deploying Trezeguet, who had just replaced Ribéry, as a central striker. During the brief interval, an exhausted Henry left the pitch for Sylvain Wiltord. In the 108th minute, Zidane and Materazzi were walking back toward the French half when a verbal exchange took place between the two. Just as everything appeared to have returned to normal, after taking a few steps forward, Zidane suddenly turned around and delivered a headbutt to Materazzi's chest, sending him falling to the ground. The foul, flagged to referee Elizondo by the fourth official Cantalejo, resulted in a straight red card for Zidane; however, Italy was unable to capitalise on their numerical superiority, and extra time ended in a stalemate. For the second time in history, following the 1994 final (in which Italy was also a finalist), the World Cup had to be decided by a penalty shoot-out.

After four penalties each, the Azzurri had all converted successfully through Pirlo, Materazzi, De Rossi, and Del Piero, while France had scored through Wiltord, Abidal, and Sagnol but missed their second attempt through Trezeguet, whose shot struck the crossbar. It was Grosso who converted the definitive spot-kick to seal a 5–3 victory, delivering Italy the fourth World Cup title in their history after those of 1934, 1938, and 1982. At the conclusion of the match, Italian midfielder Andrea Pirlo was named Man of the Match; he had been previously named the Man of the Match against Ghana in the group stage and against Germany in the semi-final. Overall, France performed well (Zidane was awarded the FIFA World Cup Golden Ball as the best player of the tournament), occupying the pitch effectively and maintaining width. On the other hand, Italy won the World Cup through highly organised collective play and excellent physical conditioning; in particular, Buffon concluded the tournament without conceding a single goal from open play by an opponent (the only one he conceded was caused by teammate Cristian Zaccardo via an own goal in the match against the United States), winning the FIFA World Cup Golden Glove as the best goalkeeper of the tournament, while centre-back Cannavaro (who went on to win the 2006 Ballon d'Or, with Buffon as runner-up) received the FIFA World Cup Silver Ball as the second best player of the tournament—a testament to the quality of the Azzurri defence, which was decisively their strongest department throughout the entire competition.

=== Details ===
9 July 2006
20:00 CEST

Italy	1–1 (a.e.t.)	France
Materazzi 19'		Zidane 7' (pen.)
Penalties
Pirlo (penalty scored); Materazzi (penalty scored); De Rossi (penalty scored); Del Piero (penalty scored); Grosso (penalty scored)	5–3	(penalty scored) Wiltord; (penalty missed) Trezeguet; (penalty scored) Abidal; (penalty scored) Sagnol

Olympiastadion, Berlin
Attendance: 69,000
Referee: Horacio Elizondo (Argentina)

Italy	France

GK	1	Gianluigi Buffon
RB	19	Gianluca Zambrotta	(yellow card) 5'
CB	5	Fabio Cannavaro (c)
CB	23	Marco Materazzi
LB	3	Fabio Grosso
RM	16	Mauro Camoranesi		(substituted off) 86'
CM	8	Gennaro Gattuso
CM	21	Andrea Pirlo
LM	20	Simone Perrotta		(substituted off) 61'
AM	10	Francesco Totti		(substituted off) 61'
CF	9	Luca Toni
Substitutions:
MF	4	Daniele De Rossi		(substituted on) 61'
FW	15	Vincenzo Iaquinta		(substituted on) 61'
FW	7	Alessandro Del Piero		(substituted on) 86'
Manager:
Marcello Lippi

GK	16	Fabien Barthez
RB	19	Willy Sagnol	(yellow card) 12'
CB	15	Lilian Thuram
CB	5	William Gallas
LB	3	Eric Abidal
CM	4	Patrick Vieira		(substituted off) 56'
CM	6	Claude Makélélé	(yellow card) 76'
RW	22	Franck Ribéry		(substituted off) 100'
AM	10	Zinedine Zidane (c)	(red card) 110'
LW	7	Florent Malouda	(yellow card) 111'
CF	12	Thierry Henry		(substituted off) 107'
Substitutions:
MF	18	Alou Diarra		(substituted on) 56'
FW	20	David Trezeguet		(substituted on) 100'
FW	11	Sylvain Wiltord		(substituted on) 107'
Manager:
Raymond Domenech

Man of the Match:
Andrea Pirlo (Italy)

Assistant referees:
Darío García (Argentina)
Rodolfo Otero (Argentina)
Fourth official:
Luis Medina Cantalejo (Spain)
Fifth official:
Víctoriano Giráldez Carrasco (Spain)

Match rules:

- 90 minutes
- 30 minutes of extra time if scores level
- Penalty shoot-out if scores still level
- 12 substitutes named, of which three may be used

=== Statistics ===
Overall
	Italy	France
Goals scored	1	1
Total shots	5	13
Shots on target	3	6
Ball possession	55%	45%
Corner kicks	5	7
Fouls committed	17	24
Offsides	4	2
Yellow cards	1	3
Red cards	0	1

=== Viewership ===
According to FIFA, 715.1 million individuals globally watched the final match of this tournament. IPG's independent media agency Initiative Worldwide estimated a 260 million people viewership. The independent firm Initiative Futures Sport + Entertainment estimates it at 322 million viewers. As for the viewership in the two countries involved, the broadcast on Italy's Rai 1 reached a maximum of 25,384,000 viewers and an 87.03% share during the penalty shoot-out, while the broadcast on France's TF1 had a general average of 22,140,000 viewers and an 80.03% share. This is the highest audience figure recorded by Italy's Auditel in the 2000s, while for France this is the second highest audience figure since 1989, the year in which Médiamétrie began its surveys.

== Post-match ==
=== Celebrations and aftermath ===
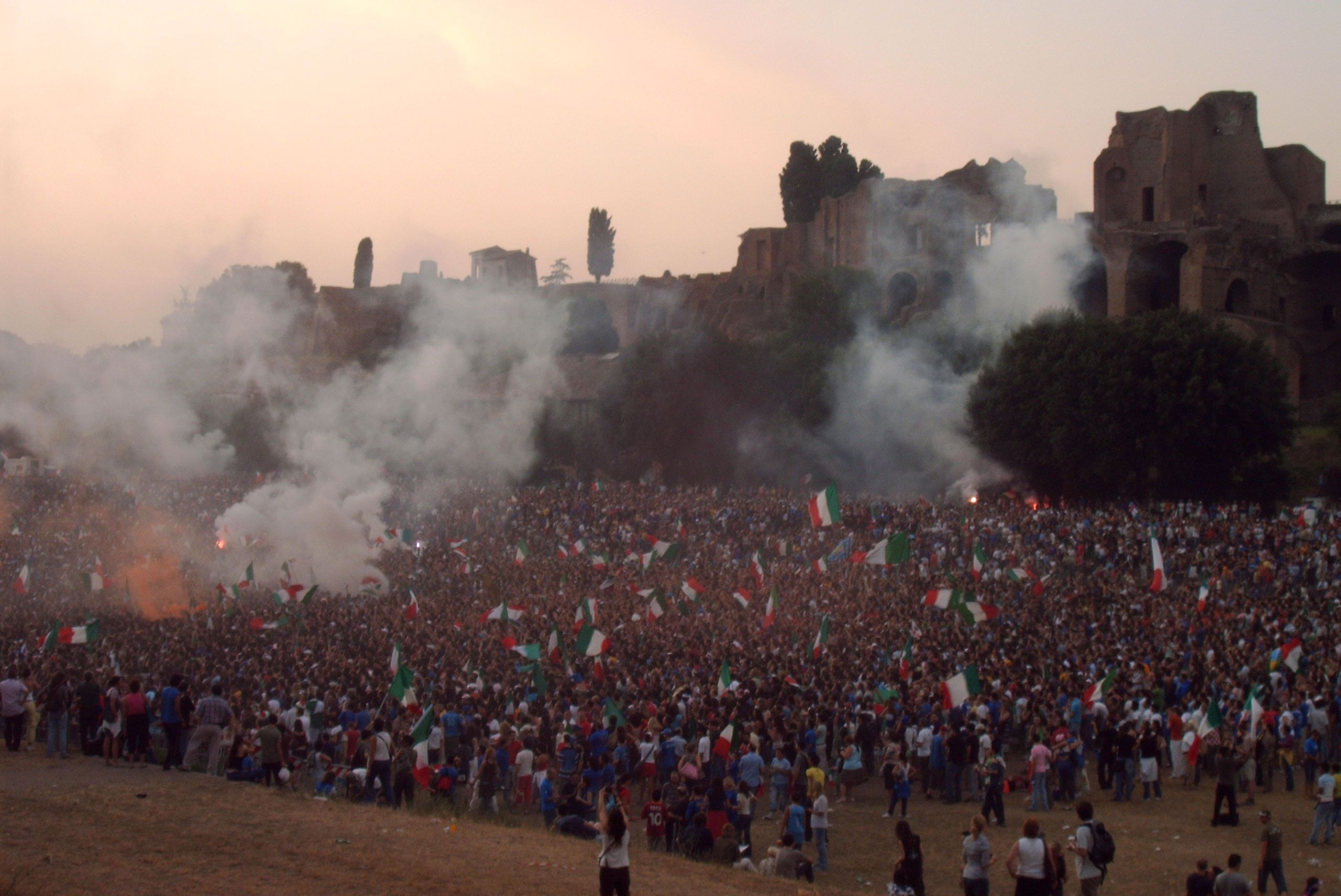
Italian fans celebrating the 2006 World Cup win at the Circus Maximus in Rome

German president Horst Köhler, UEFA president Lennart Johansson, and the local organising committee president Franz Beckenbauer were among those present on the pitch stage during the awards ceremony. President Köhler handed the trophy to Italian captain Fabio Cannavaro without FIFA president Sepp Blatter's presence. As Cannavaro raised the trophy, a short version of Patrizio Buanne's "Stand Up (Champions Theme)" was played. The victory also led to Italy topping the FIFA World Rankings in February 2007 for the first time since November 1993. Pirlo was awarded the Man of the Match. The day after the final, Zidane was awarded the FIFA World Cup Golden Ball as the player of the tournament.

For the front page of Corriere della Sera, Italy's newspaper of record, Gianni Riotta wrote: "In twenty-five years' time, when the generation of boys and girls who are still sleeping blissfully after the night of celebration for Italy's world championship grows up, the memories will remain. In the scrapbook of a lifetime's souvenirs, 9 July 2006 will be pure joy: 'When Italy won, I...'" Leading sports journalist Gianni Brera described it as a "historic win" for Italy.

The Italy team celebrated its victory with a parade in Rome the day after the final on 10 July. It was attended by 500,000 people as the team traveled to the Circus Maximus. The team also met with President Giorgio Napolitano and Prime Minister Romano Prodi, where all members of the World Cup-winning squad were awarded the Order of Merit of the Italian Republic. On 11 July, the squad delivered the FIFA World Cup Trophy to the former Juventus player Gianluca Pessotto, who was still in hospital after he fell from a window in Turin in what was alleged to have been a suicide attempt, and dedicated the win to him.

Italy manager Marcello Lippi said after the game that the win was "an immense joy" and that it took "a lot of determination and a lot of conviction in penalty shoot-outs – it's not by chance. Our boys really wanted it and that's why they were able to put away all five", and defended Marco Materazzi while France manager Raymond Domenech defended Zinedine Zidane and lamented the loss, saying Materazzi was "the man of the match, not Andrea Pirlo", and that he was "deeply disappointed" as he felt they "deserved the title based over the whole match". After winning the World Cup, Lippi also stated that this was his "most satisfying moment as a coach", even after winning the Intercontinental Cup and the UEFA Champions League with Juventus. Three days after the final, Lippi did not renew his expiring contract with the FIGC and left his office as manager of Italy, citing insults to himself and his son. He was succeeded by Roberto Donadoni.

On 14 July, five days after the final, the FIGC's Federal Commission of Appeal (despite this name, it was controversially used as a first-instance court), led by Cesare Ruperto, issued the first Calciopoli sentence that relegated Fiorentina, Lazio, and Juventus to Serie B. On 25 July, the FIGC's Federal Court (acting as the appeal court), led by Piero Sandulli, saved all clubs but Juventus from relegation, explicitily and controversially citing "people's feelings" in the sentence, claiming that is what the people wanted. Italy and France met again in the UEFA Euro 2008 qualifying, where the Azzurri had to concede a 3–1 defeat in Paris before drawing 0–0 in Milan. Before ultimately losing out in the quarter-finals to eventual winners Spain in a penalty shoot-out, Italy beat France 2–0 in the group stage in what was their first win against France without extra time since their victory (2–1) during the group stage of the 1978 World Cup in Argentina.

=== Blatter controversy ===
FIFA president Sepp Blatter generated significant controversy by breaking from tradition and refusing to attend the post-match trophy ceremony. Instead of personally presenting the World Cup trophy to the victorious Italy national football team, Blatter left the pitch before the presentation. Blatter's absence from the crowning of the world champions drew heavy criticism from Italian sports figures and media outlets. Blatter gave various versions to explain his reasons. To justify this decision, he initially explained that he had decided to let European confederation officials present the awards to the two finalists since both national teams were from Europe; he later changed his version, claiming he made the choice because the entire stadium had booed and insulted him on the opening day of the tournament (9 June in Munich).

As eight Juventus players were involved in the final and as he grew significantly under scrutiny for his criticism and statements about Italy, Blatter explained that the reason he did not attend Italy's celebration ceremony had nothing to do with Calciopoli and elaborated, "I have spoken well of Italy: they deserved the World Cup, the players reacted brilliantly to demonstrate that 'Calciopoli' involved the directors and not them. This is definitive." Nonetheless, Juventus supporters in particular critisised him, citing his close friendship with Walter Gagg (head of the FIFA Stadiums Committee), who was in turn close with the then Inter Milan chairman Giacinto Facchetti (as discovered in the Calciopoli wiretaps), as well as his December 2007 statements to Italy's leading news agency ANSA. Blatter praised and personally thanked Luca Cordero di Montezemolo, who had ties to the then Inter Milan owner Marco Tronchetti Provera, for his role as mediator when the scandal broke out, having convinced Juventus (which suffered threats that Italy be excluded from international competitions) to not turn to the ordinary courts after the sanctions resulting from the scandal, which could have cleared the club's name but at the cost of Italy having to miss the World Cup or causing other issues to Italian football, which would have had to postpone the subsequent league season. Moreover, Blatter found himself at the centre of further controversy following comments against the Azzurri, who he claimed were undeserving of the world title because they had qualified for the quarter-finals only due to what he deemed a generous penalty against Australia. Gigi Riva, Italy's former player and the then FIGC deputy commissioner, had called on Blatter to undergo a CT scan and respect Italy. Shortly afterward, Blatter backed down and apologised for his remarks.

In January 2007, Blatter made an official visit to Rome and issued a formal apology to the FIGC. He admitted that his absence in Berlin was "an error", explaining that he had initially planned to skip the presentation beforehand to avoid an "ugly scene" and public jeering from the German crowd toward FIFA. In September 2008, Blatter finally delivered the trophy to Cannavaro upon the latter's request, as well as the FIFA badge. In 2013, Blatter described the tense aftermath in Germany as a personal "hell", maintaining that his decision was solely intended to shelter the award ceremony from political whistling. In July 2012, Blatter had also alleged that the assignation of the 2006 World Cup to Germany had been bought.

== Zidane–Materazzi incident ==
=== FIFA sanctions ===
A sequence showing Zinedine Zidane headbutting Marco Materazzi and being sent off

Zidane's headbutt on Materazzi during extra time sparked controversy and a major media impact. On 11 July, FIFA opened disciplinary proceedings to investigate the incident and also affirmed the legality of Elizondo's decision to send Zidane off, rejecting claims that Cantalejo had illegally relied on video transmission to make a decision about handling Zidane's misconduct. Regarding the incident, after conducting an investigation and confirming the absence of racial slurs, FIFA issued a CHF 5,000 fine and a two-match ban against Materazzi, while Zidane received a three-match ban and a CHF 7,500 fine, respectively equivalent to €3,183 and €4,774. Since Zidane had already retired, he voluntarily served three days of community service on FIFA's behalf as a substitute for the match ban.

=== Zidane and Materazzi's views ===
On 12 July, in an interview broadcast on French television, Zidane publicly apologised for his violent act and revealed that his reaction was not triggered by racist abuse but rather by severe and repeated insults directed by the Italian defender toward his family. Zidane only partly explained that repeated harsh maternal insults had caused him to react. Materazzi admitted trash talking Zidane, but argued that Zidane's behaviour had been very arrogant and that the remarks were trivial. Materazzi also insisted that he did not insult Zidane's mother (who was ill at the time), saying, "I didn't talk about his mother, either. I lost my mother when I was fifteen, and even now I still get emotional talking about it."

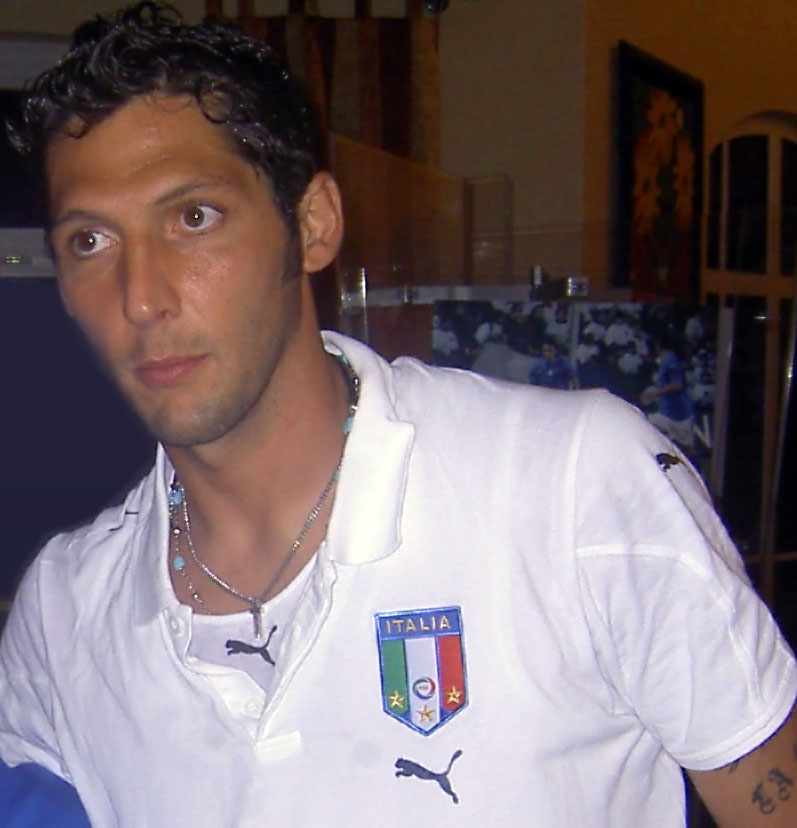
Marco Materazzi in July 2006

In his first interview, Zidane said that he did not regret his actions because "it would be like admitting that he was right to say all that". According to the BBC, Materazzi said, "I wish an ugly death to you and all your family", and then told Zidane to "go fuck yourself". SOS Racisme, a Paris-based anti-racism group, said that "several very well informed sources" had suggested Materazzi called Zidane a "dirty terrorist". Materazzi offered his version of events two months later, stating that after he had grabbed Zidane's jersey, Zidane remarked, "If you want my shirt, I will give it to you afterwards", and he replied to Zidane that he would prefer his sister, but said during the interview that he was unaware Zidane even had a sister.

After video evidence suggested that Materazzi had verbally provoked Zidane into the headbutt, several British tabloids, such as the Daily Mail, the Daily Star, and The Sun, claimed to have hired lip readers to determine what Materazzi had said, with all three newspapers alleging that Materazzi called Zidane "the son of a terrorist whore". Materazzi disputed this claim, eventually winning public apologies, statements read in open court, and libel damages from all three newspapers in 2008 and 2009.

In late 2006, Materazzi released a book titled What I Really Told Zidane, which contained 250 versions of what he had said to Zidane, including three curses from the Harry Potter series, as well as "Zidane, what are you doing? You haven't lost yet and already you've ripped your hair out", "Since Foucault died, French philosophy has sucked", and "Where exactly is the sternum?" In August 2007, Materazzi stated that he had insulted the French playmaker's sister, prompting Zidane's violent reaction. Over a year after the incident, Materazzi also confirmed that his precise words to Zidane were: "I prefer the whore that is your sister." In his 2021 memoirs, it was rendered in English as "I'd prefer you brought me your sister, that bitch."

In October 2009, in an interview conducted on French radio station RTL, Zidane stated: "Let's not forget that provocation is a terrible thing. I have never been one to provoke; I have never done it. It's terrible, and it is best not to react." In a later interview with Esquire magazine, he said, "If you look at the 14 red cards I had in my career, 12 of them were a result of provocation. This isn't justification, this isn't an excuse, but my passion, temper and blood made me react." In December 2009 and March 2010 interviews, Zidane had said that he would "rather die than apologise" to Materazzi for the headbutt in the final, but also admitted that he "could never have lived with himself" had he been allowed to remain on the pitch and help France win the match. In a January 2010 interview with the Italian newspaper la Repubblica, Materazzi said that both the headbutt and Thierry Henry's hand ball against Ireland, an episode known as "Le Hand of Frog" that allowed France to qualify to the 2010 World Cup, showed the "disgusting" side of football. In a December 2009 interview with France Football magazine, Zidane thought that there had been an over-reaction to Henry's hand ball episode. In April 2024, Materazzi recalled, "I don't like it, because it doesn't do justice to what my career was. That episode should never have happened. In the tension of that final in Berlin, amidst the bickering and insults, Zidane offered me his shirt, and I said no, that I preferred his sister. Then he turned around and reacted as everyone remembers. I never saw Zinedine again."

=== Criticism of Zidane and philosophical analysis ===
On 10 July, despite his violent gesture during the final and his verbal confrontation with referee Jorge Larrionda during the semi-final against Portugal, Zidane was nevertheless elected the best player of the World Cup tournament; this sparked controversy regarding an award that for critics seemed to have been "won from the start" for sponsorship reasons, particularly because Italian midfielder Andrea Pirlo had been named Man of the Match three times (two more than Zidane) during the tournament. Notably, after the final, President Jacques Chirac hailed Zidane as a "man of heart and conviction". Chirac defended Zidane against critics by saying that "France loves Zidane", further elaborating: "You are a virtuoso, a genius of world football. You are also a man of heart, commitment, and conviction. That is why France admires and loves you." Chirac later added that he found the offence to be unacceptable, but he understood that Zidane had been provoked.

The French public showed support for Zidane's actions; polls done in the immediate wake of the incident showed 61% of French people said they had already forgiven him for his actions while 52% said they understood them. France manager Raymond Domenech said it was "sad to see him finish like this", saying that Zidane had been "the protagonist of a great career and an excellent World Cup". He added, "When a player has to endure what he endured for so many minutes, without the referee taking action, what happened is understandable. It is not excusable, but it is understandable." The French press was not as forgiving of its champion; for the French sports newspaper L'Équipe, Zidane's gesture was far more serious than the defeat of the Bleus. The sports daily wrote, addressing the French captain, "This morning, the hardest part is not trying to understand why the Bleus lost a World Cup final within their grasp, but explaining to tens of millions of children around the world how you could let yourself strike that headbutt at Materazzi." Moreover, the French newspaper Le Figaro called the headbutt "odious" and "unacceptable". Time magazine regarded the incident as a symbol for Europe's "grappling with multi-culturalism". Despite the ongoing furore, Zidane's sponsors announced that they would stick with him.

Zidane's headbutt was analysed philosophically, leading to a body of mythological literature. The Belgian writer and filmmaker Jean-Philippe Toussaint, who was present at the stadium in Berlin during the final, focused particularly on Zidane's melancholy, writing that "it is my melancholy, I know it, I have nurtured it, I feel it." For Toussaint, the headbutt was a creative surge from the artist faced with the looming risk of failure, a "calligraphic gesture", and a stroke of genius that projected the artist Zidane out of and beyond the game of football, turning an imminent defeat into a victory. Toussaint wrote that although he was unable to "score a goal", Zidane "will score minds". For the French sociologist and philosopher Jean Baudrillard, the gesture constituted an act of "sabotage", a "terrorist" act—meant in quotation marks—against the homogenising dominance of globalisation. According to Baudrillard, with that gesture, Zidane allegedly refused to seal the nothingness staged by the "planetary identification ritual" that celebrated the ideology of globalisation as the supreme good through the media that night. Professor Franck Baetens wrote that Zidane's headbutt ultimately did not deny but rather recomposed the symbolic universe in which it takes place, arguing that "the 'footballer's' final gesture ... , far from shattering the myth, actually fulfills it."

In December 2009, major international media outlets ranked the incident at the top of the most iconic sporting moments of the 2000s; Reuters placed the headbutt at the top of the sports episodes of the decade and included the photograph of the incident in its retrospective of the 100 pictures that defined the decade, labeling it as "the headbutt of the decade". While The Guardian labeled it the single most iconic act of sporting villainy of the decade, Reuters highlighted it as a defining event that shaped the sports retrospectives of the 2000s.

=== In popular culture ===
As it was ultimately watched by billions of people, with numerous analyses by the media, the incident was extensively lampooned on the Internet and in popular culture. Family Guy parodied it in the episode "Saving Private Brian", in which Zidane headbutts an old lady while delivering her a birthday cake. The Simpsons parodied it in the episode "Marge Gamer", in which Homer Simpson shouts "Zidane!" when headbutting the linesman, an episode that also saw a cameo from Brazil's Ronaldo. As of December 2009, "Zinedine Zidane headbutt" was a common Google Search inquiry when typing his name. In addition to becoming a staple of parody via numerous online videos and GIFs, as well as T-shirts, video games, and books, a novelty song titled "Coup de Boule" (French for "headbutt") reached the top of the French charts. Headbutt (French: Coup de tête), a sculpture of the incident, was unveiled in 2012. Besides the headbutt, books about the final or to celebrate Italy's triumph continue to be written 20 years after the events, such as Gli ultimi campioni. Il romanzo dei mondiali 2006, written by Luigi Garlando and published by Turin's UTET.

== See also ==
- France at the FIFA World Cup
- Italy at the FIFA World Cup
- Juventus FC and the Italy national football team
