= Giovanni Cobolli Gigli =

Italian lawyer (born 1945)

- Born: 4 January 1945 (age 81); Albese con Cassano, Italy
- Occupation: Lawyer

Giovanni Cobolli Gigli (born 4 January 1945) is an Italian lawyer and former chairman of Juventus FC After obtaining a business degree from Bocconi University and starting out working in marketing for a multinational pharmaceutical company, he joined Turin company IFI S.p.A., which is now Exor, in 1973. He has been CEO of the Fabbri–Bompiani–Sonzogno–Etas Publishing Group since 1984, then holding the same position in Arnoldo Mondadori Editore since 1993, and in the Rinascente Group since 1994. In 2006, he became chairman of the Exor-owned Juventus association football club.

== Early life ==
The son of Antongiulio Cobolli Gigli, he was born in Albese con Cassano, province of Como, in the Lombardy region, in 1945. He was the nephew of Giuseppe Cobolli Gigli, who was minister of public works for four years in the Mussolini government. He was a pupil of the Vittorio Veneto liceo scientifico in Milan; in the same city, Cobolli Gigli graduated in economics and commerce at the Bocconi University.

== Business career ==
In September 1980, Cobolli Gigli became the executive assistant to the CEO of the Fabbri Editorial Group. He became the general manager of that company in 1984; as RCS Group became stockholder of the Fabbri Editorial Group, in 1991, he was named CEO of Rizzoli's book sector in 1991. In November 1993, he joined the Mondadori publishing group and became CEO of parent company Arnoldo Mondadori Editore S.p.A., as well as the director of many other companies within the group. In November 1994, he left to become CEO and general manager of the Rinascente Group. He stayed there until July 2005.

In 2003, Cobolli Gigli became the chairman of Federdistribuzione, and he has also been the deputy chairman and director of Confcommercio, a position he left at the end of 2005; he remains involved within FAID, the association that brings together large-scale retail companies. He has also been member of the board of directors of Alpitour (until April 2007) and Auchan (until October 2007) and member of the directorate and deputy chairman of the Italian Publishers Association (AIE). He sat on the board of directors of the Italian Trade Agency and of Federdistribuzione, of which he was confirmed as chairman in 2011, 2014, 2018, and 2020. Apart from AIE, he has also held the positions of deputy chairman of the Italian Newspaper Publishers Federation.

== Juventus F.C. ==
In the wake of the controversial Calciopoli scandal, (Note: Calciopoli remains a much-debated topic due to the one-sided focus on Juventus and Moggi, which was cited in the Naples sentence, and its harsh, unprecedented punishment.) Cobolli Gigli became the chairman of the board of Juventus; being both the most supported and hated club in the country, one of the goals upon taking over Juventus was to be nice and more likeable. He completed the new triade along with Jean-Claude Blanc (managing director) and Alessio Secco (director of sport), which led Juventus back to the UEFA Champions League but they were not able to return the club to win Serie A or any other trophies, and left the position to Blanc in 2009. In 2010, Blanc was succeeded by Andrea Agnelli, who, along with Giuseppe Marotta as new director of sport, returned Juventus to dominance; in the aftermath of Calciopoli bis and the Calciopoli trials that acquitted the club, Agnelli also took a more radical and anti-system position compared to Cobolli Gigli, who was a moderate, and Gianni Agnelli's designed heir John Elkann, who is a reformist.

Cobolli Gigli's role in the aftermath of Calciopoli has been questioned and criticized. (Note: About the behavior of Juventus executives at the time and their lack of defance, 1980 Totonero chief investigator Corrado De Biase stated: "I can't know why the Juventus owners has moved in a certain way, but I would say, 99%, that the affair was skilfully managed by the leaders of the Turin club, starting with the request from Zaccone, who left everyone stunned. Zaccone isn't incompetent, as many believe, but he was only an actor in this story." De Biase further said: "The point that makes me think that Zaccone acted on input from the owners is another, namely the way in which the top management of Juventus moved, with that fake appeal to the TAR. How, I wonder, you dismiss the executives, practically pleading guilty, then you watch inert and impassive a media and judicial destruction against your club and then you're threatening to resort to the TAR? It's the concept of closing the barn when the oxen have fled, if you think about it.") Several observers allege that Calciopoli and its aftermath were a dispute within Juventus and between the club's owners, who put Cobolli Gigli in charge, favoured Elkann over Agnelli as chairman, and wanted to get rid of Luciano Moggi, Antonio Giraudo, and Roberto Bettega, whose shares in the club increased, Whatever their intentions, it is argued they condemned Juventus, firstly when Carlo Zaccone, the club's lawyer, agreed for relegation to Serie B and point-deduction, (Note: In later years, Zaccone clarified he made that statement because Juventus were the only club risking more than one-division relegation (Serie C), and he meant for Juventus to have equal treatment with the other clubs; in the end, Juventus were the sole club to be relegated to Serie B.) and secondly when Luca Cordero di Montezemolo controversially retired the club's appeal to the Regional Administrative Court (TAR) of Lazio, (Note: About the club's renounce to the TAR appeal, De Biase said: "First you let yourself be massacred without lifting a finger, you have the title disassigned, you have the calendars drawn up for the European championships and cups, and then you threaten to go to the TAR, trumpeting everything in the newspapers? It looks much like a political move to appease the wrath of the fans, I think. If Zaccone, who is a man of value and experience, would have had the mandate to avoid the disaster he would have moved in a different way, in the sense that he would have pointed out these 'anomalies' in the time between the trial and the announcement of the verdicts. That, in fact, was the right moment to threaten to appeal to the TAR, when the sentences had not yet been written, but had to be done in camera caritatis, asking for a meeting with Ruperto, Sandulli, and Palazzi, and not in front of the journalists of La Gazzetta dello Sport." De Biase concluded: "Please note that I'm not discussing the high strategy of the forensic art, but the basic principles, the ABC of the profession, the things that are taught to the boys who come to the studio to do a traineeship: if you, the defence attorney, think you have weapons to play, you ask for a meeting with the judge and the public prosecution, in the period between the trial and the verdict, and point out that, if the response is judged too severe, you will use them. And here there were weapons in industrial quantities. Then, in the face of a fait accompli, who takes the responsibility of stopping a machine that grinds billions of euros, so as to be the sixth industry in the country?" Several observers, including former FIGC president Franco Carraro, argue that had Gianni Agnelli and his younger brother, Umberto Agnelli, been alive, things would have been different, as the club and its directors would have been defended properly, which could have avoided relegation and cleared the club's name much earlier than the Calciopoli trials of the 2010s. When Tangentopoli hit the country in the 1990s, Gianni Agnelli said: "My men must be defended to the last degree of judgement.") for which then FIFA president Sepp Blatter thanked Montezemolo, and that could have cleared the club's name and avoid relegation, after FIFA and UEFA threatened to suspend the Italian Football Federation (FIGC) from international play. In September 2006, Cobolli Gigli took a U-turn from his previous statements, and led the moderate line to have the club controversially renounce the TAR's appeal; then CONI president Gianni Petrucci thanked Elkann and Montezemolo. (Note: Cobolli Gigli defended the club's choice. In 2014, he said: "As has already been said several times, we had received heavy warnings and pressure from UEFA which had threatened to exclude us from international competitions for the next few years. And at that point we were cornered and inevitably had to act that way. ... And I repeat, it was an inevitable decision to avoid heavy sanctions and very much negative repercussions for the club's future.")

The lack of TAR appeal, which is one of the reasons for which the club's appeals to return the 2005 and 2006 scudetti and FIGC damage claims all failed, amounted to a sort of public plea bargain and guilty admission; (Note: In February 2019, Cobolli Gigli denied that it was a public plea bargain, and said: "The plea deal is an act of cowards and Juventus did not negotiate during Calciopoli, [we] simply accepted the sentence.") however, the club was later acquitted in the first ordinary justice proceedings, and Juventus were not liable by other clubs, as the 2004–06 leagues were regular. (Note: De Biase commented on the sentence of Francesco Saverio Borrelli, who spoke of a structured illicit, which was not part of the Code of Sports Justice, as a crime committed by Moggi and his associates. He said: "We're talking about a structured illicit. But what is it? It doesn't exist. They want to make it clear that there's something different, anomalous. But structured illicit, not at all. There's no sporting illicit. We can't talk about things that don't exist in the sports judicial system. I still haven't seen any proof of sporting illicit. Until now, what I see is the violation of Article 1 of the Sports Justice Code, which requires members to behave according to the principles of loyalty, correctness, and probity. But of what we have read to date, it doesn't prove to me that there was an attempt to alter a match." About Borrelli's role, journalist Giorgio Bocca stated: "The appointment of Borrelli to direct the investigation into the great football scandal is the litmus test, the chemical reagent, the proof of truth, the fall of lies, the naked king of the Berlusconi people who 'don't give up', who don't tolerate returns to justice, who conceive democracy only as an alliance of the strongest and richest clans." Calciopoli judge Piero Sandulli stated that the GEA World ruling dismantled the prosecution, and commented: "We punished the violation of internal rules in 2006. Basically, our sentence highlighted above all bad habits, not classic illicit acts. It had to be made clear that what was in the wiretapping is not to be done. It was an ethical condemnation. The criminal trial evaluates other things.") The initial view was that Juventus were the main culprit, and referees, Inter Milan, and other clubs the victims. As early as 2010, when many other clubs were implicated and Inter Milan, Livorno, and Milan were liable of direct Article 6 violations (the one about illicits warranting relegation; Juventus were never charged of Article 6 violations) in the 2011 Palazzi Report but were time-barred by the statute of limitations and could not be put on trial, Juventus considered challenging the non-assignment of the 2005 title and the 2006 title assignment of third-placed Inter Milan, dependent on the results of Calciopoli trials connected to the scandal. In July 2011, the FIGC declared itself not competent to rule on the decision and the title remained to Inter Milan, as Juventus claimed €443 million in damage claims. (Note: About the 2006 scudetto, Cobolli Gigli told Adnkronos in October 2010 that "it was won on the pitch by Juventus. President Andrea Agnelli is doing his job very well. If I had all the elements at my disposal in 2006, I probably could have said the same thing." In April 2011, asked about the ordinary trial in Naples, he replied: "The 2006 Scudetto must be removed [from Inter Milan]. After those interceptions there is no reason for it to remain on the Nerazzurri bulletin board. ... Juventus would do well to ask for the scudetti to be returned. They have been won on the field, the players have made great sacrifices to win them. But I don't think that happens." In July 2011, about Guido Rossi's decision to award the 2006 Serie A title to third-placed Inter Milan, he said: "It was a decision taken too hastily, I think everything is still open. Whatever happens, it will be a difficult solution to overcome but during my presidency I have nothing to reproach myself because after Serie B we managed to return to Serie A despite a heavy penalty, getting to play in two Champions Leagues. The credit must be attributed first of all to the players who decided to immerse themselves in a reality that was new to them, to coach Deschamps and to the club at the time." About the statute of limitations, he said: "If we talk about the statute of limitations, it means that the times within which the decisions had to be taken have expired. I wonder, however, if these decisions could have been taken within the established times.")

Cobolli Gigli came to agree on the criticism. (Note: In November 2022, in response to an interview by former Inter Milan chairman Massimo Moratti, Cobolli Gigli said: "He talked about everything, but one question was missing: 'Why in 2006 Inter Milan didn't appear in the Calciopoli trial, while 4 or 5 years later the Nerazzurri file appeared, for which the prosecutor Palazzi spoke of a serious sporting offence?' Everyone has forgotten it, I'm sorry, even angry about this matter: if Inter Milan had been in the sporting trial with Juventus, and had been accused, as happened only years later, of a 'serious sporting offence', they would have been a whole other story." He added that "someone hid the binder, someone powerful because to hide something like this... But I didn't understand, however, why after 5 years they made it reappear. Perhaps to give Juventus a further moral slap, as if to say: 'When I wanted to hide something, I made it disappear. When everything was by now time-barred, here it is. The leagues were not to be awarded to anyone: at least there would have been two culprits, instead in Calciopoli there was only one sinner.") In May 2018, he said that Inter Milan "deserved to be punished" for Calciopoli, and expressed regrets for the sporting trials, about which he said: "We were demoted to play the 2006–07 season in Serie B and accepted the ruling. The regret remains for a sporting trial that was, in my view, not conducted in the best way. Certain pieces of evidence were ignored, actually it's more accurate to say hidden, and the existence of other telephone wiretaps regarding different clubs wasn't made known at the time. Inter [Milan] too deserved to be punished for what emerged in the various conversations. The FIGC Prosecutor Palazzi said so. It all emerged when the matter missed the statute of limitations and it ended like that."

Cobolli Gigli remains a commentator for Juventus affairs. About the capital gains scandal of the 2020s, which led to Agnelli's resignation, about which Cobolli Gigli said was forced, he cited the Calciopoli unequal treatment and criticized the fact that only Juventus were punished. Videos emerged of Ciro Santoriello, the capital gains case's prosecutor, mocking Juve; he declared himself a tifoso of Napoli and an anti-Juventus prosecutor. In response, Cobolli Gigli said: "Benigni reminded us that Article 21, on freedom of thought, is the most important. However, the manifestation of one's ideas must always be limited to one's duties. Therefore, I believe that if these gentlemen want to express their thoughts, they must do so without playing the roles they currently do. Santoriello should have kept his feelings to himself as a judge, Juve's acquittal on that occasion counts for little."

== See also ==
- List of Juventus F.C. chairmen
