= Alessio Secco =

Alessio Secco (born 5 January 1970) is an Italian licensed football agent and intermediary. Secco has also been the director of football for the Italian Serie A club Juventus as well as Serie B clubs Modena and Padova.

== Career with Juventus ==
Secco first joined Juventus in 1999, working as a press secretary and then as team manager in 2000 under Carlo Ancelotti. He then worked under Luciano Moggi but was promoted to Moggi's position on 23 May 2006 when Moggi was forced to step down due to the Calciopoli scandal that year. Former Juventus player Didier Deschamps was brought in as manager and Juventus topped the Serie B to win promotion. However, he and Deschamps had a falling-out over multiple issues, leading to Deschamps' resignation at the end of May 2007 with only two games remaining.

Working together with chairman Jean-Claude Blanc, Secco proceeded to purchase players in an effort to revitalize the team after Juventus regained promotion to the Serie A. However, he soon came under fire from Bianconeri fans due to his failure in buying top class players capable helping Juventus mount a title challenge against the likes of Internazionale, Milan and Roma. Although credited with preventing the sale of goalkeeper Gianluigi Buffon and young stars Sebastian Giovinco and Claudio Marchisio, he was highly criticized for signing players such as Tiago Mendes, Sergio Almirón, and defenders Jean-Alain Boumsong and Jorge Andrade during the 2007–08 season even though Juventus finished third in the league, thus qualifying for Champions League football the following season. Meanwhile, Mendes, Almirón and Boumsong were all either loaned out or sold by the winter transfer window of the 2009–10 season. In February 2009, it was confirmed that he renewed his contract until 2011. He courted controversy after it was discovered that he had allegedly spoken to representatives from Genoa and reportedly communicated with Moggi despite the latter's five-year "excommunication" from football.

Despite 2008–09 season ending on a high note, Juventus endured a dismal run in the Champions League and later the Europa League during the 2009–10 season. They were eliminated from European competitions after 4–1 defeat away at Fulham despite taking an early lead and traveling supporters chanted "Vattene Blanc e Secco" (Get lost Blanc and Secco) after the final whistle. The players were also jeered at upon their return to Turin and Secco and Blanc came under scathing criticism from fans and the media, as well as several club legends. Italian daily Il Giornale even went as far as to accuse the duo of "embarrassing" the club.

== Career with Modena ==
On the 8th of July 2012 Secco is hired as General Director of Modena FC. After a permanence of just under a year, on the 3rd of July 2013 he submits his resignation, completing his subsequent move to Calcio Padova.

== Career with Padova ==
On July 3, 2013 he became the sporting director of Padova. On the same day in agreement with president Diego Penocchio, he entrusts the position of technical manager of the first team to Dario Marcolin, with him at Modena. On August 29, he joins the board of directors of the FIGC Technical Sector as a representative for the Lega Serie B. On January 4, 2014, he consensually breaks off his relationship with Padova.

== Football agent and intermediary ==
Secco is currently a licensed FIFA Agent and Intermediary.

== Personal life ==
Secco has a wife named Paola and two children, Filippo and Sofia. All of the family currently live in Turin.
