= Italo Allodi =

Italian football manager

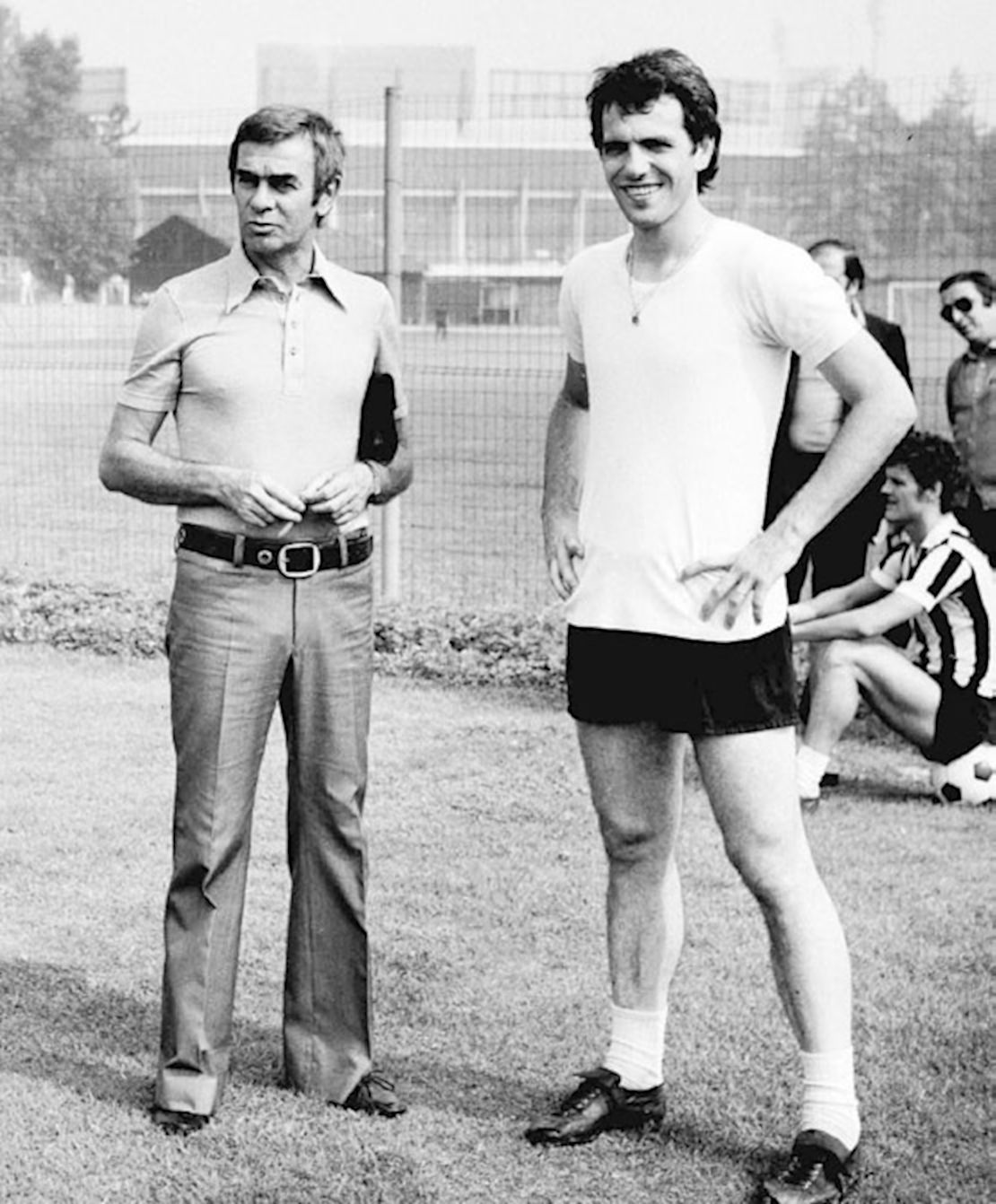
Allodi (left) and Roberto Bettega with Juventus in the early 1970s

Italo Allodi (Asiago, 13 April 1928 – Florence, 3 June 1999) was an Italian association football player and manager.

== Career ==
Allodi was born the son of a railwayman. He served in an official position for various and Italian football clubs, including Mantova, Internazionale, Juventus, Fiorentina and Napoli, winning six Serie A, two UEFA Champions League and two Intercontinental Cup. Allodi was also responsible for recruiting Luciano Moggi as his protégé. During his career, Allodi was accused to partake in some match fixing scandals, but the Italian Football Federation and UEFA never found him guilty, and he was absolved from every charges. He was inducted into the Italian Football Hall of Fame in 2017.
