= Luciano Moggi =

Former association football administrator (born 1937)

- Born: 10 July 1937 (age 89); Monticiano, Kingdom of Italy
- Occupation: Businessman

Luciano Moggi (Italian pronunciation: [luˈtʃaːno ˈmɔddʒi]; born 10 July 1937) is a former Italian association football administrator who was a club executive for Roma, Lazio, Torino, Napoli, and Juventus. During his career, he led them to win six Serie A (five with Juventus and one with Naples), three Coppa Italia (with Roma, Torino, and Juventus), five Supercoppa Italiana (four with Juventus and one with Napoli), one UEFA Champions League, one Intercontinental Cup, one UEFA Super Cup, one Intertoto Cup (all with Juventus), and one UEFA Cup (with Napoli). He has since become a freelance journalist, commentator, and TV guest.

In May 2006, Moggi was involved in the sports scandal that became known as Calciopoli, which remains a much debated and controversial topic due to the one-sided focus on Juventus and Moggi, an issue that was cited in the sentence of the first-instance trial held in Naples. The related Calciopoli trials in Naples, which revealed the implications of many other clubs who could not be put on trial due to the statute of limitations and were not weighted in the Moggi sentences, absolved him of some related offences and reached the appeal sentence in December 2013 with a sentence of 2 years and 4 months in prison. The appeal sentence and his remaining charges related to Calciopoli were respectively annulled and cancelled without a new trial due to the statute of limitations by Italy's Supreme Court of Cassation in March 2015. On the other hand, he was acquitted of criminal conspiracy throughout all three judgements in the other Calciopoli trial in Rome related to GEA World that ended in January 2014. In March 2020, Moggi appealed to the European Court of Human Rights for the conduct of the trials.

== Biography ==
Moggi was born into a modest family in Monticiano, in the province of Siena, on 10 July 1937. He had a passion for football from an early age, playing for forty days in Akragas in the 1963–64 Serie C season. He left school in 1950. After middle school, he worked at the Ferrovie dello Stato Italiane, settling in Civitavecchia and playing as a stopper in teams of lower categories. In the late 1960s, dissatisfied with his work and tired of playing football without income, Moggi envisioned a future as a talent scout, particularly in minor football. His son, Alessandro Moggi, works as an agent for several football players and managers. He is head of GEA World, a consortium of football agents and managers, which was ranked first by volume (in terms of market share within Italy's football agency industry) from 2002 to 2006.

== Career ==
Moggi worked as a railway station caretaker until the early 1970s, when he met Italo Allodi, then Juventus' managing director, who appointed him to minor roles at the club. Before being called as chief managing director by Juventus in 1994, he worked for and collaborated with several teams, such as Roma, Lazio, Torino, and Napoli, where he won several league, domestic, and confederal titles.

=== Juventus and Roma ===
After entering senior football in the 1970s for Juventus under general manager Allodi, Moggi organized a network of scouts looking for young talent in suburban fields. Among his footballers are the sixteen year old Paolo Rossi in 1972, Claudio Gentile in 1973, and Gaetano Scirea in 1974. A few years later, Moggi took on a more important role, and he also established contacts with the other teams to start negotiations until he was forced to change companies due to the break with then-Juventus president Giampiero Boniperti.

Moggi's next job was at Roma of the new president Gaetano Anzalone. Thanks to the help of some journalists, it was Moggi who came forward and got to know Anzalone, who decided on his job as transfer market consultant in 1977. During his period at Roma, which won the 1979–80 Coppa Italia, Moggi acquired Roberto Pruzzo, who was blown right to Boniperti's Juventus. His departure from Roma occurred a few days after Dino Viola, the new president, learned that, on the eve of the match against Ascoli, Moggi had been having dinner with Claudio Pieri, the match referee. It was 25 November 1979 and the tenth matchday of the 1979–80 Serie A that was being played; Roma won the match 1–0 and the president of Ascoli, Costantino Rozzi, was upset about a refereeing that, in his view, was in favour of Roma. In the locker room, Rozzi met Viola, to whom he said his criticism of Moggi, seen in a restaurant in the company of the referee and the two linesmen. Moggi described it as a casual event. Viola used the episode as a pretest to release Moggi, telling him he wanted a sporting director who lived in Rome, even though Moggi lived in the Rome metropolitan area of Civitavecchia.

=== Lazio, Torino, and Napoli ===
After the 1980 Italian football betting scandal, which came to be known as Totonero and in which he was not involved, Moggi was hired as general manager by Lazio to relaunch it. After two years, he resigned with the club still in Serie B. In 1982, he moved to Torino of president Sergio Rossi and managing director Luciano Nizzola. He suffered the protests of the fans due to the underwhelming market hits completed, such as the Argentine Patricio Hernández, or missed ones, such as the Yugoslav Safet Sušić. He remained at Torino for five years with mixed results. On 29 May 1987, he resigned from his position.

On 22 June 1987, Moggi moved at Napoli of Corrado Ferlaino and Diego Armando Maradona immediately after the victory of their first scudetto, succeeding Allodi. Under Moggi, Napoli achieved its greatest success in the club's history, having won the 1989 UEFA Cup final, the 1989–90 Serie A, and the 1990 Supercoppa Italiana. In March 1991, Moggi resigned due to incompatibility with Ferlaino.

After his exit from Napoli, Moggi returned at Torino under president Gian Mauro Borsano. Shortly after his signing, Torino won the 1991 Mitropa Cup final; the club also reached the 1992 UEFA Cup final, which was lost due to the away goals rule, and won the 1993 Coppa Italia final due to the same rule. In 1994, he was investigated together with his collaborator Luigi Pavarese for sporting offenses and aiding and abetting prostitution for referees during the 1991–92 UEFA Cup matches. Borsano and the accountant Giovanni Matta testified that it was Moggi who personally took care of the hospitality of the referees and linesmen, and of providing them with prostitutes for the home games, while the services were paid for by Torino through black funds. All charges were dismissed by the preliminary hearing judge (GUP) because the actions did not constitute a violation of the prostitution law and Pavarese assumed all the responsibilities, while on the sporting side the fraud could not exist as sporting fraud did not apply to UEFA matches and UEFA quickly closed its investigation.

=== Roma and Juventus ===
After leaving Torino, Moggi returned at Franco Sensi's Roma; the two did not see eye to eye and his stint at Roma was brief. In 1994, he moved at Juventus under the managing director Antonio Giraudo and where he would be described by Gianni Agnelli as "the king's groom, who must know all horse thieves". The twelve years with Juventus were the most successful of his entire management career and placed him among the most important football managers at national and international level. Juventus won five leagues (plus one revoked and one left unassigned), one UEFA Champions League, one Intercontinental Cup, one UEFA Super Cup, one Intertoto Cup, one Coppa Italia, and four Supercoppa Italiana. He also reached three Champions League finals, one UEFA Cup final, and two other finals of Coppa Italia.

Moggi remained at Juventus until May 2006 when he resigned, and said that his soul had been killed, referring to his "love" for football. He was linked to a judicial investigation in the sports field known as Calciopoli. Some telephone tapping of an investigation filed by the Turin's public prosecution office were published in some newspapers, and the folders of the investigation had been sent to Franco Carraro, then president of the Italian Football Federation (FIGC) and himself involved in the scandal but came out unscattered not without controversy. According to the allegations of corruption of a public official, Moggi ordered the referee designators Pierluigi Pairetto, then also a referee delegate for UEFA, and Paolo Bergamo the names of some referees who had to be drawn to referee the matches in Serie A of Juventus and also of others clubs and also discussing on referees for the next Champions League (something that other managers, such Giacinto Facchetti, he claimed they also did but the wiretaps, considered irrelevant at that time in the investigation, only emerged in public opinion years later), as well as that of referees for friendlies (as they were friendlies, this was not against the rules since there was not a draw and the organizers could choose the referee themselves, and there was no evidence of corruption or that Moggi had requested a corrupted referee).

When the investigation was made public with the publications of the transcripts from the wiretaps (not all of which proved to be accurate and most of them only showing the pro-prosecution side as they were only a dozen out of the hundreds of thousands), in violation of the law, a scandal broke out; the leak was later investigated but it was not found who had caused it, although it was clear that it came out from Rome, where the investigation was done. It was this public revelation that led to the resignation of Moggi, among others. This investigation heavily relied on wiretaps by the Carabinieri in Rome after a request by the public prosecutor's office of Naples, which had begun an unrelated football betting investigation implicating the Camorra that led to penalty points for some minor clubs. According to these new allegations, which theorized the crime of criminal conspiracy aimed at sports fraud, Moggi had singular relationships with some people who gravitated around Italian sports journalism, with the aim of putting the work of referees and clubs in a good or bad light; all investigated journalists later had the charges dismissed or were acquitted. In relation to the investigation regarding friendlies and UEFA's referee designation, the Turin public prosecutor asked for all the charges (ranging from criminal conspiracy aimed at sports fraud to corruption and sports fraud) to be dismissed and the criminal investigation was closed; at the same time, the documentation was sent through folders to the FIGC on the grounds that although there was nothing criminally relevant, it may be relevant for sports justice. (Note: Writing for Il Foglio, journalist Christian Rocca stated: "For a week, Italians have had media proof that Juventus is buying referees. But this 'proof' comes from a request for dismissal which, on the contrary and without any doubt, proves how Juventus didn't buy the referees." The magistrate and then public prosecutor Marcello Maddalena, not known as a garantista (he once told Marco Travaglio, a journalist well known for his giustizialista views who often sides with the prosecution including in Calciopoli, that "the moment immediately following the arrest is a 'magical moment'"), justified the dismissal because it is "an investigation undoubtedly destined to last for years and to fill the pages of newspapers and radio and television broadcasts forever, but for the start of which, it is repeated, it hasn't remained at the state (after all the investigations that have been carried out), not even a shred of 'news' that allows it." About Juventus' punishment, Rocca wrote: "In a normal country there would have been a public apology to Juventus and only, I repeat only, a severe ethical and disciplinary judgment against the designator of the referees and the director of a sports club caught having too close relations. Rome and Naples [trials] concern something else, as far as we know: the management of players, not referees." About the wiretaps, Maddalena stated: "In all the imposing mass of intercepted conversations there emerges an integral attitude, a sort of 'presumption' or 'superiority complex' that could sound like this: 'We're the best, the strongest, the most beautiful, the most everything, therefore we don't need complacent referees or favours but only good, honest, and fair referees, who referee according to the rules... And so we will win.' And in fact all the observations, the comments, the indications (for friendly matches), the suggestions regarding the referees always seem to be placed in the perspective of the search for the best referee for Juve matches, the referee who best guarantees the regular progress and the regular outcome of the sporting competition." Maddalena also stated that Juventus was in fact unfairly penalized, for example from the wiretaps it appears that against Sampdoria the referee Paolo Dondarini advantaged the latter by not booking their players after their unsportsmanlike conduct (the referee stated in the wiretaps with Pairetto after the match that he felt threatened by them), and in injury time he showed a willingness to give them a penalty kick, after a report by the linesman Marcello Ambrosini, knowing that it was not in accordance with the rules of the league; the penalty was not given, as Ambrosini recognized his mistake (despite this, Dondarini initially insisted on giving the penalty since it would not change the result of the match, which was won by Juventus 3–0, and to avoid controversy as any real or perceived favour to Juventus was followed by a media frenzy that damaged their careers) and the correct decision of a corner kick was issued (only after Ambrosini told Dondarini that they would look like fools for giving a non-existent penalty kick, the referee agreed not to give it) while the earlier penalty kick given to Juventus was judged correct and in good faith. Maddalena observed that there was in fact positive evidence in support of acquittal, stating that "with regard to any appointments of referees aimed at favouring Juventus, the objective analysis of the documentation not only doesn't confirm the initial investigative hypothesis, but on the contrary, evidence of the opposite sign is obtained, indicative of the absence of irregularities and of more or not disguised of referee designations piloted by Pairetto." According to Rocca, "they didn't even enter the trial because the same public prosecutor who first hypothesized against them the crime of conspiracy, then corruption, and finally sports fraud – and for this reason entered them in the register of suspects – decided that the elements collected, that is to say the phone calls we read in the newspapers, were not only not sufficient to support the accusatory hypothesis in a trial, but they weren't even enough to continue the investigation neither for the crime of association, nor for the crime of corruption or for the crime of sports fraud.")

== Calciopoli ==
In May 2006, Moggi was linked as the central figure in Calciopoli, a vast referee lobbying scandal spanning the professional top two Italian football leagues. Daily newspaper la Repubblica published the contents of several wiretappings in which Moggi, along with the country's former referee nominator Pierluigi Pairetto, was said to assign referees to specific matches, including many in which Juventus was not a participant. Moggi received a five-year ban from football and a recommendation to the FIGC president that he be banned for life from membership of the FIGC at any level. This was controversial because he and Giraudo (both from Juventus) were the sole executives to be banned for life, which came a few months before their five-year ban expired. As summarized by Carlo Garganese for Goal.com, "[the FIGC sentence] stated perfectly clearly [sic] that no Article 6 violations (match-fixing/attempted match-fixing breaks the sixth article of the sporting code) were found within the intercepted calls and the season was fair and legitimate, but that the ex-Juventus directors nonetheless demonstrated they could potentially benefit from their exclusive relationship with referee designators Gianluigi Pairetto and Paolo Bergamo. There were, however, no requests for specific referees, no demands for favours and no conversations between Juventus directors and referees themselves." Juventus had been absolved in the ordinary justice proceedings, and the courts ruled that Moggi acted in his self-interest to help Lazio and Fiorentina, which is why Juventus was absolved of wrongdoings and was not liable by other clubs; Moggi said that he did not care about Fiorentina and Lazio but that Carraro did, citing his own wiretaps in which Carraro asked to help them.

As early as 2010, when many other clubs were implicated and Inter Milan, Livorno, and Milan liable of direct Article 6 violations in the 2011 Palazzi Report, Juventus considered challenging the stripping of their scudetto from 2006 and the non-assignment of the 2005 title, dependent on the results of Calciopoli trials connected to the 2006 scandal. On 8 November 2011, Naples court issued the first conclusion of the criminal case against Moggi and the other football personalities involved, sentencing him to jail for five years and four months for criminal conspiracy. In December 2013, Moggi's sentence was reduced to two years and four months for being found guilty of conspiring to commit a crime; the earlier charge of sporting fraud was dismissed, owing to the statute of limitations. On 23 March 2015, in its final resolution, Italy's Supreme Court of Cassation ruled that Moggi was acquitted of "some individual charges for sporting fraud, but not from being the 'promoter' of the 'criminal conspiracy' that culminated in Calciopoli." Nevertheless, the remaining charges of Moggi were cancelled without a new trial due to the statute of limitations.

When Moggi's conviction in criminal court in connection with the scandal was partially written off by the Supreme Court, Juventus sued the FIGC for €443 million for damages caused by their 2006 relegation. Then-FIGC president Carlo Tavecchio offered to discuss reinstatement of the lost scudetti in exchange for Juventus dropping the lawsuit. On 9 September 2015, the Supreme Court released a 150-page document that explained its final ruling of the case, based on the controversial 2006 sporting sentence, which did not take in consideration the other clubs involved because they could not be put on trial due to the statute of limitations, and it would be necessary to request and open a revocation of judgment pursuant to Article 39 of the Code of Sports Justice. Despite his remaining charges being cancelled without a new trial due to the statute of limitations, the court confirmed that Moggi was actively involved in the sporting fraud, which was intended to favour Juventus and increase his own personal benefits according to La Gazzetta dello Sport. As did the Naples court in 2012, the court commented that the developments and behavior of other clubs and executives were not investigated in depth. In 2016, the TAR tribunal rejected the request of compensation promoted by Juventus on the grounds that "the TAR cannot rule if the arbitration panel has already done so"; the reasoning was that "the entire matter had already been dealt with in a previous appeal, again presented by Juventus in 2006, and then abandoned by the company, which preferred to appeal to the arbitration award from which it however emerged defeated." On 15 March 2017, Moggi's lifetime ban was definitively confirmed on final appeal on the grounds that the case did not fall under its jurisdiction.

Moggi continues to make observations on the Serie A on Italy's newspapers, as well as sports and local television channels, such as Sportitalia and Telecapri Sport, and is often a TV guest, such as on Nove. Since 2011, he collaborates with Radio Manà Manà. In March 2020, having exhausted appeals in Italy's courts, Moggi appealed to the European Court of Human Rights for the conduct of the trials, including the lack of time given to the defence in the 2006 sporting trial, (Note: Judge Corrado De Biase, 1980 Totonero chief investigator, was quoted as saying: "I have only read detached sentences in the newspapers, I don't think I have read about a sporting offence to alter the result. I don't seem to have seen matches bought or sold. When I hear from Commissioner Rossi that he will do everything himself and that can come to judgment even without questioning, there is something that does not add up." Lawyer Gaetano Scalise commented: "The special commissioner of the FIGC has given us only three days to study thousands and thousands of papers and present briefs. Do you understand what I'm talking about?") among other issues; Giraudo's was accepted (when nine out of ten times it is usually rejected) in September 2021.

== Proceedings ==
Calciopoli trials were much debated and controversial since their beginning in 2006. While supporters of the prosecution cite the sentences as evidence, there remains controversy and unclear aspects. Several observers and commentators feel that Moggi was made a scapegoat, (Note: Writing for Il Tirreno, journalist Enzo Biagi stated: "[This was a] crazy ruling, and not because football is a clean environment. A crazy ruling because it's built on nothing, on wiretaps that are difficult to interpret and can't be proposed in a [trial] procedure worthy of the name, a crazy sentence because it punishes those who were guilty only of living in a certain environment, all seasoned with a process that was a re-edition of the Holy Inquisition in a modern key." Biagi wondered whether Moggi has been identified as "the villain to be fed to the populace" amid numerous other scandals in the country at that time, including the SISMI-Telecom scandal. Biagi's words would be later revoked due to the Calciopoli bis developments.) cited inconsistencies in the sentences, (Note: Among others, former Milan and Italy national football team coach Arrigo Sacchi commented that Moggi was a scapegoat for "an environment with connivance and collusion", and of a sporting culture that "did not allow us to know how to lose". About the court's rulings, Sacchi stated: "We had three judicial bodies and all three expressed themselves in a different way from the other: either the first sentence was wrong, or the second or the third.") such as Juventus being absolved and the league not being fixed but the club was relegated to Serie B, including the lack of investigation into other clubs and executives, and argue that only Moggi and Juventus paid, and that it was disproportionate, (Note: De Biase said: "First of all, we must have the courage to affirm a reality: this summer's procedure gave birth to an authentic legal abort. When I speak of 'legal abort' I take full responsibility for what I say. When you want to complete a procedure in two weeks that would take at least 6 months just for a correct investigative process, it can only result in a legal abort. When, for reasons of time, a degree of judgment is received, when the defendants are prevented from bringing witnesses, dossiers and films in their defence, but only 15 minutes are allowed for a defence, one can only speak of legal abort. When the defence lawyers of the accused are not granted the full texts of the wiretaps, alleging that they are not pertinent, we can only speak of legal abort. Finally, when a title is disassigned to a club, Juventus, to assign it to another, Inter Milan, before the verdict of the first preliminary iter [justice proceedings] is pronounced, then we are well beyond legal abort. It's not a problem of ordinary or sporting justice: in any country that defines itself as civil, any penalties and sanctions must be imposed after a guilty verdict has been recorded, never before. And don't talk to me about UEFA regulations or lists to be given to the same for the European cups: the rights of the accused, including that of being able to defend themselves with the means that the law makes available to them, come before a football match." About punishments, De Biase stated: "I, on my own, can only reiterate the concept already expressed: a penalty of 8/10 points, a fine, and a ban of Moggi and Giraudo for 10/12 months, this was the appropriate penalty in my opinion. Any parallel with the story of 1980 is unthinkable: here there're no traces of offence, nor of money or checks. The environmental offence isn't a crime covered by any code, unless we're talking about air pollution.") since unlike other clubs and executives, who could not be put on trial due to the statute of limitations, they were never charged of Article 6 violations (Inter Milan, Livorno, and A.C. Milan were the clubs charged of Article 6 violations by the prosecutor Stefano Palazzi in 2011), the one about illicits that is ground for relegation. (Note: De Biase commented on the sentence of Francesco Saverio Borrelli, who spoke of a structured illicit, which was not part of the Code of Sports Justice, as a crime committed by Moggi and his associates. He said: "We're talking about a structured illicit. But what is it? It doesn't exist. They want to make it clear that there's something different, anomalous. But structured illicit, not at all. There's no sporting illicit. We can't talk about things that don't exist in the sports judicial system. I still haven't seen any proof of sporting illicit. Until now, what I see is the violation of Article 1 of the Sports Justice Code, which requires members to behave according to the principles of loyalty, correctness, and probity. But of what we have read to date, it doesn't prove to me that there was an attempt to alter a match." About Borrelli's role, journalist Giorgio Bocca stated: "The appointment of Borrelli to direct the investigation into the great football scandal is the litmus test, the chemical reagent, the proof of truth, the fall of lies, the naked king of the Berlusconi people who 'don't give up', who don't tolerate returns to justice, who conceive democracy only as an alliance of the strongest and richest clans.") No judge returned evidence to affirm that the 2004–05 Serie A was fixed as charged by the prosecution; the chief prosecutor had to change the charge to that of anticipated crime for something that was not committed, and Moggi's charge, as written in the Naples sentence, which did not take in consideration the thousands of thousands wiretaps that were publicly released by Moggi's legal team in 2010 and were available to the investigators back in 2006 but were not used, was not that he fixed matches or leagues but that his behavior was close enough to "the limit of the existence of the crime of attempt", hence the conviction.

Some observers alleged that Calciopoli and its aftermath were also a dispute within Juventus and between the club's owners, who wanted to get rid of Moggi, Giraudo, and Roberto Bettega, whose shares in the club increased. Whatever their intentions, it is argued they condemned Juventus, firstly when lawyer Carlo Zaccone asked for relegation and point-deduction, (Note: In later years, Zaccone clarified he made that statement because Juventus were the only club risking more than one-division relegation (Serie C), and he meant for Juventus (the sole club to be ultimately demoted) to have equal treatment with the other clubs.) and secondly when Luca Cordero di Montezemolo retired the club's appeal to the Regional Administrative Court (TAR) of Lazio, (Note: About the behavior of Juventus executives at the time and their lack of defance, De Biase stated: "I can't know why the Juventus owners has moved in a certain way, but I would say, 99%, that the affair was skilfully managed by the leaders of the Turin club, starting with the request from Zaccone, who left everyone stunned. Zaccone isn't incompetent, as many believe, but he was only an actor in this story." De Biase further said: "The point that makes me think that Zaccone acted on input from the owners is another, namely the way in which the top management of Juventus moved, with that fake appeal to the TAR. How, I wonder, you dismiss the executives, practically pleading guilty, then you watch inert and impassive a media and judicial destruction against your club and then you're threatening to resort to the TAR? It's the concept of closing the barn when the oxen have fled, if you think about it." About the club's renounce to the TAR appeal, De Biase said: "First you let yourself be massacred without lifting a finger, you have the title disassigned, you have the calendars drawn up for the European leagues and cups and then you threaten to go to the TAR, trumpeting everything in the newspapers? It looks much like a political move to appease the wrath of the fans, I think. If Zaccone, who is a man of value and experience, would have had the mandate to avoid the disaster he would have moved in a different way, in the sense that he would have pointed out these 'anomalies' in the time between the trial and the announcement of the verdicts. That, in fact, was the right moment to threaten to appeal to the TAR, when the sentences had not yet been written, but had to be done in camera caritatis, asking for a meeting with Ruperto, Sandulli, and Palazzi, and not in front of the journalists of La Gazzetta dello Sport." De Biase concluded: "Please note that I'm not discussing the high strategy of the forensic art, but the basic principles, the ABC of the profession, the things that are taught to the boys who come to the studio to do a traineeship: if you, the defence attorney, think you have weapons to play, you ask for a meeting with the judge and the public prosecution, in the period between the trial and the verdict, and point out that, if the response is judged too severe, you will use them. And here there were weapons in industrial quantities. Then, in the face of a fait accompli, who takes the responsibility of stopping a machine that grinds billions of euros, so as to be the sixth industry in the country?") for which then FIFA president Sepp Blatter and then CONI president Gianni Petrucci thanked John Elkann and Montezemolo, and that could have reduced Moggi's charges and cleared the club's name and avoid relegation, after FIFA threatened to suspend the FIGC and barring all Italian clubs from international play. This amounted, as recounted by Corriere della Sera journalist Mario Sconcerti, to "a sort of public plea bargain" and guilty admission. (Note: Giovanni Cobolli Gigli, the Juventus chairman at the time, defended the club's choice. In 2014, he said: "As has already been said several times, we had received heavy warnings and pressure from UEFA which had threatened to exclude us from international competitions for the next few years. And at that point we were cornered and inevitably had to act that way. ... And I repeat, it was an inevitable decision to avoid heavy sanctions and very much negative repercussions for the club's future." In February 2019, Cobolli Gigli denied that it was a public plea bargain, and said: "The plea deal is an act of cowards and Juventus did not negotiate during Calciopoli, [we] simply accepted the sentence.") In 2012, Calciopoli judge Piero Sandulli stated that the GEA World sentence, resulting in the acquittal of all defendants for criminal conspiracy in the Rome trials, had dismantled the prosecution. He commented: "We punished the violation of internal rules in 2006. Basically, our sentence highlighted above all bad habits, not classic illicit acts. It had to be made clear that what was in the wiretapping is not to be done. It was an ethical condemnation. The criminal trial evaluates other things."

=== Sports justice ===
In the sports sentence, the Federal Appeal Commission (CAF), a FIGC judicial court, (Note: In 2006, there were two separate bodies within the FIGC judiciary, namely the investigating body, constituted by the investigation office and chaired by Borrelli, and the prosecuting body, represented by FIGC prosecutor Stefano Palazzi. Additionally, the 2006 sports proceedings were held in the first-instance trial court before the CAF, chaired by Cesare Ruperto (president of the Constitutional Court in 2001 and 2002), and not before the FIGC's Disciplinary Commissions due to the involvement of FIGC executives (Franco Carraro, Cosimo Maria Ferri, and Innocenzo Mazzini). Consequently, the appeal judge was Piero Sandulli of the CAF.) stated that Juventus was not responsible for Fiorentina avoiding relegation, and that Moggi and Giraudo operated independently of Juventus and its owners. In addition, the court ruled that there was no evidence of match fixing or a Moggi system, as was reported by La Gazzetta dello Sport. Finally, referee selections were done in accordance with the rules of the FIGC, phone calls made by Moggi to referee designator Paolo Bergamo did not constitute in itself a sporting illicit, and there was no organization of targeted yellow cards. Nonetheless, the sentence stated that "though Moggi didn't exercise his ability to condition matches, he still possessed the ability", and even though there were no Article 6 violations against Juventus, it introduced the much-disputed illecito associativo ("associative illicit") violation, (Note: The violation charged to Juventus and its two top sports executives, Moggi and Giraudo, is often defined with the term illecito strutturato ("structurred illicit"). The alleged offence was not a case identified by the Sports Justice Code and was introduced in the new code following the Calciopoli events; in sports judgments, there is no mention of illecito strutturato, which was popularized through some media. The latter term was given by Borrelli, who became head of the FIGC investigation office upon the appointment of the FIGC extraordinary commissioner Guido Rossi to replace Italo Pappa, the resigning general of the Guardia di Finanza. With this term, Borrelli wanted to describe the alleged existence of a stable and irregular network of relations between the Juventus management, the federal top management, and the refereeing world.) which resulted in the club's controversial relegation; even though the club had won the scudetto other 27 times (more than any other), was widely considered both at the time and in retrospect the strongest team, and essentially the same team successfully defended the scudetto the following year (a league that was not an object of investigation and was deemed regular), the given motivation was that Juventus' advantage was evidenced by their first position finish in the standings at the end of the season.

In July 2006, the FIGC's Court of Justice confirmed a five-year ban for Moggi, with a proposal to ban him for life. In response to the sentence, he said: "I am not bitter for myself, but for the teams implicated and for their supporters. No match was fixed, no referees were favored. It is why Juventus and the other clubs, but especially the fans, are frustrated by this sentence." In 2010, the FIGC banned Moggi for life. In response, he said: "I don't know anything, I don't know what it means, they should be ashamed after what came out. I speak for myself, Giraudo, for those who suffer from this situation, they should expel Carraro." Moggi then went on to say: "I have never said that everyone is guilty and therefore there is no one to blame. There is a practice, you have to ban Carraro when he says in wiretaps that you have to save Fiorentina and Lazio." He commented: "I hope that in a short time the state authorities will decide to intervene, perhaps with an institutional control body, on the federal atrocities that have been committed and are continuing to be committed against me." He wondered "why the sports judges, having to have condemned me on the basis of a handful of interceptions, despite knowing that there were many others, did not continue to investigate as was their duty, and only in these days have realized their faults and their omissions, which surprisingly claim to conclude with the statute of limitations for Moratti and company, and a ban for the undersigned, as they would never have dared to doeven in the Banana Republic." On 9 July 2011, the Federal Court confirmed his ban. In 2012, CONI confirmed Moggi's lifetime ban. The TAR of Lazio rejected the request for suspension of the provision of the High Court of Sports Justice. In 2016, the TAR rejected the appeal on the grounds that it lacked jurisdiction, definitively confirming the foreclosure from any position in the context of Italian sport. On 15 March 2017, Italy's Council of State judged inadmissible the appeal filed by Moggi against the lifetime ban due to lack of jurisdiction of the state judge.

=== Criminal justice ===
==== Rome trials ====
Moggi was charged of criminal conspiracy aimed at unlawful competition through threats and private violence as part of the investigation into the GEA World company. According to the prosecution, he and his son, Alessandro Moggi, as well as Franco Zavaglia, were the promoters of the system of power that would have led GEA to exercise a dominant function in the world of football. The indictment stated that the three would have created GEA to "acquire the largest number of sports attorneys, through them, obtain a contractual power capable of decisively affecting the football market, to influence the management of players and consequently that of various teams in the football league". In 2009, the X section of the Rome Court acquitted Moggi, together with all the other GEA members, of the criminal conspiracy charge, and sentenced Moggi to 1 year and 6 months' imprisonment for private violence against the football players Manuele Blasi, who was induced to leave his sports manager, Stefano Antonelli, to go to GEA, and Nicola Amoruso, on similar grounds.

In the appeal trial on 25 March 2011, the acquittal sentence regarding the charge of criminal conspiracy aimed at unlawful competition was confirmed as the request for a sentence of 4 years and 8 months by the attorney general Alberto Mussel was rejected. The sentence of the appeal trial reduced it to one year's imprisonment due to the statute of limitations of the facts relating to Amoruso; it also sentenced Moggi to pay damages against the football agent Stefano Antonelli and the FIGC, and confirmed the acquittal for the charge of criminal conspiracy. The one-year sentence would not have been served as it was covered by the 2006 pardon. On 15 January 2014, Italy's Supreme Court of Cassation confirmed the acquittal verdict issued in the two previous instances with regard to the charge of criminal conspiracy aimed at unlawful competition. As for the one-year sentence for private violence established on appeal, the trial ended with the annulment "for incorrect application of the law" and without a new trial due to the statute of limitations.

==== Naples trials ====
In October 2008, chief prosecutor Giuseppe Narducci was quoted in court as saying: "Like it or not, no other calls exist between the designators and other directors." During the criminal trials in Naples, the legal team of Moggi released a number of wiretaps showing that Inter Milan, Milan, and many other Italian clubs and executives not previously investigated in 2006 were involved in referee lobbying. Moggi's lawyer Maurilio Prioreschi asked the court to take in consideration that between 2006 (the year of the first sentences) and 2011 (the year of the sentence on Moggi's lifetime ban) numerous hearings were held during the criminal trial in Naples, from which wiretaps involving other club executives that, according to Moggi's legal defence, would drop the basic assumption of the 2006 sporting conviction, namely that relating to the conditioning of the referees thanks to the preferential treatment by the referee designators towards Moggi and Juventus, which in turn led to the sporting offence. Many of those wiretaps formed the body of Palazzi's report, with which the FIGC's chief prosecutor intended to refer many executives and clubs for violations of the Code of Sports Justice, a circumstance that was prevented only by the statute of limitations. The court's Disciplinary Commission purposely ignored this defensive argument, and arguing that it was a reassessment of the facts not permitted at that time, no importance was given to the conduct of those other clubs and executives that had just emerged during the criminal trial. According to the FIGC's Court of Justice, as explained in its judgment of appeal in regards to the term attualizzare ("actualize"), the court was there not to expand the evidence on which the first judgment was based but rather to ascertain whether at that time those established facts were still serious enough to justify a lifetime ban; it concluded that this ruling must be expressed exclusively "on the basis of the sentences rendered" against Moggi, and cannot take into consideration any comparative judgment with conducts possibly attributable to other subjects of the FIGC law. The court stated that to have a reassessment of the facts of Calciopoli, it would be necessary to request and open a revocation of judgment pursuant to Article 39 of the Code of Sports Justice.

On 8 November 2011, Moggi was sentenced in the first instance by the Naples Court to 5 years and 4 months in prison (in addition to the five-year ban and lifetime ban) for promoting the criminal conspiracy. On 17 December 2013, in the appeal process, the sentence was reduced to 2 years and 4 months. On 24 March 2015, the Supreme Court of Cassation annulled the verdict of conviction in the second instance without a new trial, as the crime of criminal conspiracy was extinguished by the statute of limitations, and of two charges of sports fraud due to the non-existence of the crime, as well as the rejection of the appeal for some charges of sports fraud, which were extinguished by the statute of limitations in 2012.

=== Moggi's reactions ===
Moggi always declared himself innocent, and in his appeals to the European Court of Human Rights stated that "if they give me a pardon, I renounce it. Pardon is for those who are guilty, I'm not guilty, I didn't do anything [criminal]. They weren't angry at me, they were angry at Juventus because it won too much." About his actions, Moggi stated that they were criticizable, and he was wrong from an ethical standpoint but that he did not commit any illicit or crime; he said that "[t]he sports court, at the end of the trial, ruled as follows: 'Regular league, no match altered.' Therefore Juventus [is] exempt from crimes referred to in Art. 6. The final ruling of the ordinary justice instead spoke of 'early consummation' crimes, which are nothing more than the fruit of hypotheses and inferences of that prosecutor who in the courtroom had asserted 'there were no other phone calls, if not those of the suspects in the trial', while the [Italian Football] Federation Prosecutor asserted that 'Inter Milan was the club that risked most of all for the illegal behavior of its President Facchetti.'" About the Swiss sim cards, Moggi stated that he used them to circumvent "those [such as Inter Milan and Inter Milan's Telecom] who intercepted us", with reference to transfer operations. He commented: "We had bought Stanković and we also had the contract ready to be presented to the [Italian Football] Federation. After two months the player and his agent disappeared, we found them at Inter Milan." About the wiretaps, Moggi said that he never intruded on the designation of referees, and spoke of incomplete wiretaps for the prosecution. Moggi also reiterated that "[t]hey accused me of going to the referees' locker room but that's not true; others did. Paparesta's kidnapping never happened, it was just a joke."

Moggi maintained that political, economic, and sporting power is in Milan and Rome, not in Turin, there really was a criminal conspiracy but he was not involved in it, and was instead in Milan and Rome, led by then-FIGC president Franco Carraro, and that then-Milan's vice-president Adriano Galliani held the most power and was in conflict of interest, as he was also Lega Calcio president. In 2014, Andrea Agnelli, who became president of Juventus in 2010, stated: "Moggi represents a beautiful and important part of our history. We are the country of Catholicism and forgiveness. We can also forgive people, can't we?" Moggi responded: "Nice words. I thank Andrea Agnelli, but I don't need forgiveness. If anything, I deserve praise for [the 16 trophies won on the pitch for the club]. ... There were twenty clubs and they behaved in the same way but only Juve paid because it bothered." In response to the final verdict in 2015, which came after six hours of delibaration, Moggi said: "We mucked about for nine years and that's not nice because this abnormal trial has come to nothing. Just a lot of expense. In nine years, it has been established that the championship was by the book, the draws were by the book and there were no conversations about designations." He said that it merely let the courts off the hook, not him, and vowed to turn to the European courts in hopes to have his ban from football world lifted.

About the allegations of altered leagues, Moggi responded: "There's only one reality. When I was at Juve, we won two consecutive league titles at most. From 2000 to 2004, they were won by Lazio, Milan, and Roma. Lazio won because of the flood at the stadium with a 74-minute suspension of the [Perugia–Juventus] match. This was something that never happened before. Roma also won thanks to the Nakata case. They made us lose leagues for irregular things, at that moment Juve was the weak side." In regards to the controversial 2000 Perugia–Juventus match, to which he regretted not having the team retire and go home, Moggi criticized the match's referee Pierluigi Collina. Collina was particularly liked before and during Calciopoli by Milan's and Rome's clubs, had the same Milan's sponsor, and secretly met with Galliani, who selected him as referee designator due to being Lega Calcio president, at Milan's Leonardo Meani's restaurant. While he would be unaffected by Calciopoli, he was found to be close to Milan, of which he shared the same sponsor (Opel) without the consent of the FIGC's then-referee association president Tullio Lanese, leading to his resignement and retirement, after which he said he was a Lazio supporter. Observers agree that rules were violated. Moggi said: "I was accused of being the great manipulator in football, so explain to me how I managed to lose a league by playing the decisive match in a pool. The truth is that Juve should have left, instead we remained there at the mercy of those who decided and when we took the field we were no longer there. [Collina] certainly spoke to someone on the phone: who it was, we will never know. I'm just saying that by regulation the suspension can't last more than 45 minutes: instead Collina waited almost double." In later years, he further commented: "As it happens, it then comes out of the wiretaps that Collina goes to talk to Galliani and says: 'I will come at midnight, I enter the back door so they don't see me.' If Milan couldn't win, they didn't want Juventus to win either." Carlo Ancelotti, Juventus coach from 1999 to 2001 and Milan coach at the time of Calciopoli, testified in 2010 that he found the Perugia match to be the only odd fact.

About Silvio Berlusconi, Moggi said: "I thanked him and I thank him for his esteem for me, maybe I reserve him a criticism for what he didn't do to the Calciopoli explosion: he knew that innocent people would be penalized, obviously for him too it was a priority to demolish Juventus' domain." Moggi also said that Berlusconi wanted him at Milan, and during a private meeting to discuss the matter revealed to him that "the FIGC possessed some of [Moggi's] wiretaps without any criminal value, of which Galliani (then-vice-president of Milan and president of Lega Calcio), Carraro (then-president of the FIGC), [and] General Pappa, head of the investigations office of the FIGC, were also aware." Moggi stated that those same wiretaps were made public just a few days after. Moggi had earlier said that Galliani made Calciopoli come out because Berlusconi wanted him at Milan. In regard to the dispute between the FIGC and Juventus, Moggi responded to then-FIGC president Carlo Tavecchio: "From the trials, it turns out that there has been no alteration of the league, there has been no alteration of the referee grids, even 30 referees were acquitted of the charges. I've helped some of these acquitted referees, I've helped many financially. Poor boys, I felt sorry for them, they didn't know how to pay the lawyer. They were ruined by Calciopoli." About the Supreme Court's sentence, Moggi reiterated his innocence of the criminal conspiracy charge, and added: "The Supreme Court speaks of power. But power isn't a crime. I had power because I worked well, it was power because of the quality of the work [as general director] I did." Apart from Milan, Moggi said that he was also sought by Inter Milan. Citing Gianni Agnelli's quote that "the king's groom must have known all the horse thieves", Moggi discussed how "Agnelli said that because during my time it was full of sons of bitches. And he wanted an expert, one who could stand up to these here. For me it's a compliment."

=== Other proceedings ===
In April 2007, the documents relating to the charge against Moggi of kidnapping referee Gianluca Paparesta were sent to the Reggio Calabria prosecutor's office; in the end, the prosecutor filed the case because "the fact does not exist". On 21 January 2009, the preliminary hearing judge (GUP) in Milan acquitted Moggi of the charge of defamation against Inter Milan. Moggi was accused of having defamed Inter Milan as he said that they had saved themselves by negotiating the case of the false passport of Álvaro Recoba without relevant consequences, unlike what happened to Juventus in the Calciopoli case. Gabriele Oriali, at the time an Inter Milan executive, negotiated a sentence of 6 months' imprisonment for receiving stolen goods and forgery. The GUP of Milan considered that Moggi's words were only "expression of the right to criticize, at best imprecise, but not criminally relevant".

On 14 May 2009, the justice of the peace of Lecce acquitted Moggi and referee Massimo De Santis of the charge of sports fraud and match-fixing related to the Lecce–Juventus and Lecce–Fiorentina matches of the 2004–05 Serie A, as sanctioned by the sporting judgements. In particular, the judge established that "the fact described has not been proven in any way" and that "the Judge also does not consider the sentences rendered by the sports justice bodies fully usable since the latter judgment is structurally different from the ordinary judgement. Nor is it believed that the telephone interceptions referred to in the course of the proceedings can have probative value, since they cannot be used in a proceeding other than the one in which they are ordered."

On 24 November 2009, Moggi, along with Giraudo, Roberto Bettega, and Juventus, was acquitted of the charges concerning the management of the club's accounts "because the fact does not exist". Prosecutors had asked for three years in prison for Moggi. On 14 September 2010, Moggi, along with Giraudo, Bettega, Jean-Claude Blanc, and Giovanni Cobolli Gigli, was acquitted of the charge of tax violations on Juventus' financial statements from 2005 to 2008. Turin's judge Eleonora Montserrat Pappalettere accepted the dismissal request presented by the same public prosecutor's office Turin and closed the case opened by an investigation by the Guardia di Finanza. On 11 November 2010, Juventus withdrew the lawsuit against Moggi, Giraudo, and Bettega presented within the same process for the financial statements of the club's old financial management.

On 11 November 2011, the monocratic judge of Rome sentenced Moggi to 4 months' imprisonment and to pay damages of €7,000 to Franco Baldini, who received threats during a trial in which he had to testify. In June 2012, Moggi was sentenced to pay the court costs for the civil lawsuit for defamation brought against Carlo Petrini and Kaos publisher in the light of some sentences in the book Calcio nei coglioni. According to the court of Milan, those sentences are not defamatory but deducible from the report of the Carabinieri also disseminated by the newspapers on the 2005 Offside investigation.

In July 2015, Moggi was acquitted by the Milan court of the charge of defaming former Inter Milan president Giacinto Facchetti in a television broadcast. Moggi had publicly accused Facchetti "of having also requested and obtained special treatment in the refereeing of Inter Milan's matches". The judge dismissed the lawsuit and acquitted Moggi, finding "with certainty a good truthfulness" in his statements and citing the existence of "a sort of lobbying intervention on the part of the-then president of Inter Milan towards the referee class ... , significant of a relationship of a friendly [and] preferential type, [with] heights that are not properly commendable." The sentence was upheld on appeal in 2018, and passed judgment in 2019.

In May 2016, Moggi was sentenced to a €1,000 fine and separate damages for defaming Carabinieri officer Attilio Auricchio, who investigated Calciopoli. The judge made the conditional suspension of the sentence conditional on the payment of a provisional amount of €20,000.

== Personal views and politics ==
Amid homophobic statements in the Croatian Football Federation, Moggi was quoted as saying in 2010 of gay footballers that "[a] homosexual can't fulfil the job of a footballer. I wouldn't put one under contract and if I discovered I had one, he would fly immediately." In 2013, he declared his intention to run for Italy's Chamber of Deputies as part of Stefania Craxi's Italian Reformists list in Piedmont 1 within the centre-right coalition. Ahead of the 2016 Turin municipal election, he declared his intention to vote for Piero Fassino of the centre-left coalition. He also said that he always voted Sergio Chiamparino (centre-left coalition) for mayor of Turin, and that if he made an electoral list in Turin with Gianluigi Buffon, they would win.

== In popular culture ==
In 2021, Moggi was featured in an episode of Netflix's documentary series Bad Sport about Calciopoli.

== Books ==
- Bucchioni, Enzo; D'Ascoli, Mario; Moggi, Luciano (2007). Un calcio nel cuore (in Italian) (paperback ed.). Milan: TEA. ISBN 978-88-502-1411-2.
- Ligabue, Andrea; Moggi, Luciano (2014). Il pallone lo porto io. Calcio, trattative e spogliatoi: tutto quello che non ho mai detto (in Italian) (hardcover ed.). Milan: Mondadori. ISBN 978-88-046-3854-4.
