= Linkiesta =

Independent Italian online newspaper

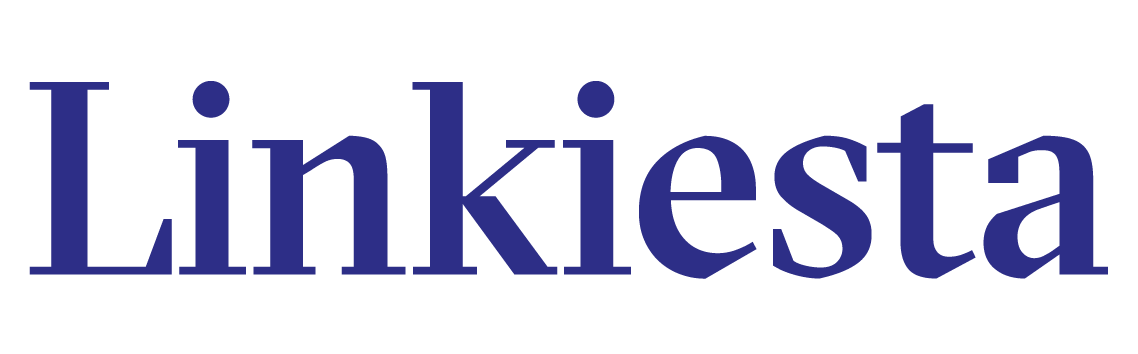
- Editor: Christian Rocca
- Frequency: Online newspaper
- Publisher: Editoriale Linkiesta.it S.r.l.
- First issue: 31 January 2011
- Country: Italy
- Language: Italian
- Website: www.linkiesta.it

Linkiesta is an independent Italian online newspaper of investigative journalism, in-depth analysis, and commentary. It was launched on 31 January 2011, with the first editor-in-chief being Jacopo Tondelli. Since 24 September 2019, the editor-in-chief has been Christian Rocca.

The Società Editoriale Linkiesta is a start-up comprising journalists and businessmen. It is a public company with about 80 shareholders who have put in an investment between €10,000 and €50,000. The governance rules state that nobody can own more than 5% of the capital stock. Initially, a full list of shareholders was published on the website. In a video interview published on Il Sole 24 Ore, Tondelli said: "Many shareholders and no bosses. As we are a public company, nobody can exert individual influence on the editorial line."
