= Christian Rocca =

Italian newspaper journalist and blogger (born 1968)

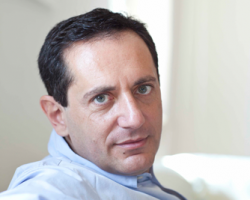
- Born: 23 January 1968 (age 57); Alcamo, Italy
- Occupation(s): Journalist and blogger

Christian Rocca (born 23 January 1968) is an Italian newspaper journalist and blogger. As a writer, he is the author of the essay Sulle strade di Barney (2010), a voyage into the world of Mordecai Richler, the author of Barney's Version.

== Career ==
Born in Alcamo, in the Southern Italy region of Sicily, Rocca graduated in jurisprudence at Università Cattolica del Sacro Cuore in Milan. Afterwards, he started his political activity with the Radical Party of Marco Pannella and Emma Bonino. In 1991, he was the parliamentary assistant of Peppino Calderisi. Some years later, he devoted himself to journalism with Il Foglio of Giuliano Ferrara since its foundation; he is also a correspondent for Il Sole 24 Ore and writes on Vanity Fair Italia, mainly dealing with American and International politics. Until December 2013, he wrote a music column entitled Gommalacca each Sunday for the Sole 24 Ore, and since February 2012 he is the director of the magazine IL, the monthly insert of the same newspaper. Since 2002, he has held a newspaper blog, Camilloblog.it, which has reached the first position in the International classification of Wikio.

On 4 October 2012, Rocca polemicized on Twitter with Massimo Bordin. During the radio broadcast Stampa e regime, Bordin revealed Rocca's frequentations with Nicolò Pollari and Pio Pompa at the Sismi headquarters relating the articles written about the Nigergate case. On the following day, the strife was commented on Il Foglio by Ferrara, who said that Rocca's sources were "the official reports of the American Senate and of the various commissions of inquiry of the United Kingdom about the different scandals linked to that event", and that the meeting with Pollari and Pompa had taken place only after the publication of the articles. The newspapers la Repubblica and il Fatto Quotidiano, quoting the same article written by Ferrara, spoke of a campaign of disinformation in favour of SISMI against the surveys carried out by Giuseppe D'Avanzo and Carlo Bonini on the Nigergate.

Since September 2019 he is editor in chief of Linkiesta.

== Works ==
- Esportare l'America. La rivoluzione democratica dei neoconservatori, I libri de Il Foglio, 2003.
- Contro l'ONU. Il fallimento delle Nazioni Unite e la formidabile idea di un'alleanza tra le democrazie, Edizioni Lindau, 2005, ISBN 88-7180-543-7.
- Cambiare regime. La sinistra e gli ultimi 45 dittatori, Einaudi, 2006, ISBN 88-06-18291-9.
- Sulle strade di Barney, Bompiani, 2010.
- Chiudete internet. Una modesta proposta, Marsilio, 2019, ISBN 978-88-297-0025-7.

== Sources ==
- Francesco Melia e Gaetano Stellino (a cura di), Lo frutto, i 150 anni del Liceo Classico di Alcamo, Campo, Alcamo, 2012, p. 151
- "Comunicazione di servizio". Archived from the original on 29 July 2017.
- "Christian Rocca".
- "Spie in redazione:lo scontro Repubblica-Il Foglio".
- "Le miserie del Sismi".
- "Spioni a mezzo stampa".
