= GEA World =

Italian sport management company

- Company type: Società per azioni S.p.A
- Industry: Sport management
- Founded: 2001; 25 years ago
- Founder: Alessandro Moggi and Riccardo Calleri
- Headquarters: Rome, Italy
- Number of locations: Dubai, London, Montecarlo
- Area served: 10+ countries
- Key people: Alessandro Moggi (Chief Executive Officer and President) and Riccardo Calleri (co-founder)
- Services: Representing football players, player transfers, consulting to international sports entities and clubs, and event production
- Website: geaworld.com

GEA World is an Italian consultancy and sports management company with offices in Rome, Dubai and London, operating in sports business industry. Alessandro Moggi is its president in partnership with Franco Zavaglia, Riccardo Calleri and Ivan Vecchietti.

== History ==
The company was founded in 2001 by Alessandro Moggi, after he had spent a decade working as a sport entrepreneur and manager.

In 2006, the company was investigated for "illegal competition with use of threats and violence" in relation to the 200 players it had on its books. The allegations included pressure from the company to team coaches over team selection.

In January 2013, after several years of athlete management, Gea World dramatically changed direction. It transitioned from managing players to instead offering consultations within sport systems, event organization, image management, marketing and corporate social responsibility.

Within a short period of time, Gea World has earned a high importance role being a top consultant of international corporations and star football clubs. Gea World has also developed projects in co-operation with scientific associations.

On 22 January 2014, at the Chamber of Deputies in Rome, Gea World launched Gea Tutor, a mentoring support service for athletes with the goal of helping them to transition in both their personal and professional lives as their public careers comes to a close. Since may 2022 helping the continuing of gea world alessandro moggi’s son, Luciano Lorenzo Moggi, nephew of former juventus sporting director Luciano Moggi started working in the agency.
